= Sarah Jenyns =

Sarah Jenyns may refer to:

- Sarah Churchill, Duchess of Marlborough (1660–1744), née Jenyns, English courtier and noblewoman
- Sarah Ann Jenyns (1865–1952), Australian businesswoman
