= Mincom =

Mincom can refer to:

- The Ministry of Communications of Morocco
- Mincom Limited, an Australian EAM software provider
- The defunct Mincom division of 3M, which specialized in magnetic tape recorders for instrumentation and sound recording, and other electronic products
