= Wallace Bishop =

Wallace Bishop may refer to:

- Wallace Bishop (musician), American swing jazz drummer
- Wallace Bishop (company), Australian retailer
- Wally Bishop, American cartoonist
