= Don Argus =

Australian businessman

Don Argus AC CPA SF
- Born: 1 August 1938 (age 87)
- Education: Anglican Church Grammar School; Harvard Business School
- Occupation: Business executive
- Awards: Companion of the Order of Australia

Donald Robert Argus AC CPA SF (born 1 August 1938) is an Australian businessman, chairman of Bank of America Australia advisory board and member of Monash University's Monash Business School advisory board. He is a former member of Bank of America's inaugural Global Advisory Council (2013–2019); former chairman of BHP (1999–2010) and Brambles (1999–2008), former director of the Australian Foundation Investment Company (1999–2013) and former CEO of National Australia Bank (1991–1999). He was educated at the Anglican Church Grammar School.

Argus spent much of his early career in the banking industry. He was credited with leading National Australia Bank (NAB) to recovery from a difficult period in the late 1980s and was the Executive Director Banking at NAB prior to succeeding Neil Clark as chief executive officer on 1 October 1990, having been at the bank since the 1956. During his leadership market capitalisation grew from A$5.5 billion to a peak of A$37 billion. EPS growth in that period grew at a rate of 128%.

Argus joined the board of BHP in 1996, assuming the role of chairman in 1999, at which time the market capitalisation was A$17.28 billion. During his stewardship he oversaw the formation of a dual listed companies (DLC) structure between BHP and Anglo–Dutch miner Billiton and at the time of his retirement in 2010, BHP Billiton had a combined market capitalisation of A$226.5 billion.

Former positions held include member of the international advisory board of Allianz, member of the international advisory committee to the New York Stock Exchange board of directors and was also a part of the board of the winemaker Southcorp but resigned following its acquisition of Rosemount.

Argus was also co-chair of the Policy Transition Group on Mining Resources Rent Tax for the Australian Government (2010) and chaired what was to become known as the “Argus Review” into the Australian Cricket Team's performance commissioned by Cricket Australia (2011). In 2007 he was named one of the most influential figures in Australian business by The Bulletin magazine.

Argus is a senior fellow (SF) of Financial Services Institute of Australasia (Finsia), a Fellow of Certified Practising Accountants Australia (CPA) and an alumnus of Harvard Business School (AMP). He has been awarded honorary degrees from Monash University (Doctor of Laws), Griffith University (Doctor of the university) and the University of Queensland (Doctor of Business), and in 2009 was an inaugural inductee of the Queensland Business Leaders Hall of Fame.

== Honours ==
- Argus was appointed an Officer of the Order of Australia (AO) in 1998 for "service to banking and finance, particularly as Managing Director and Chief Executive Officer of the National Australia Bank Ltd and for his contributions as a member and supporter of a wide range of community and sporting organisations".
- He was awarded the Centenary Medal in 2001 for "service to Australian society through business".
- In the Australia Day Honours of 2010, he was raised to Companion of the Order of Australia (AC), for "eminent service to business and commerce through leadership in the mining and finance industries, and to the community through the promotion of philanthropy, and executive roles in conservation, health, charitable and sporting organisations".
- Argus was inducted into the Queensland Business Leaders Hall of Fame in 2009.
