= Kate Mary Smith =

Australian businesswoman

Kate Mary Smith (1847-1932) was a businesswoman from Brisbane, Queensland. She was Queensland's first female funeral director, with her business being called K. M. Smith Funeral Directors.

Born Catherine Mary Farrell, Kate immigrated to Australia in the 1860s and married John Smith, who had using his cabinet-making and carpentry skills to make coffins. After John died in 1886, Kate ran the business with the assistance of her eldest son, also called John. She closely monitored all aspects of the business.

Smith was inducted into the Queensland Business Leaders Hall of Fame in 2010.
