= Paula Stafford =

Australian fashion designer (1920–2022)

Paula Stafford OAM
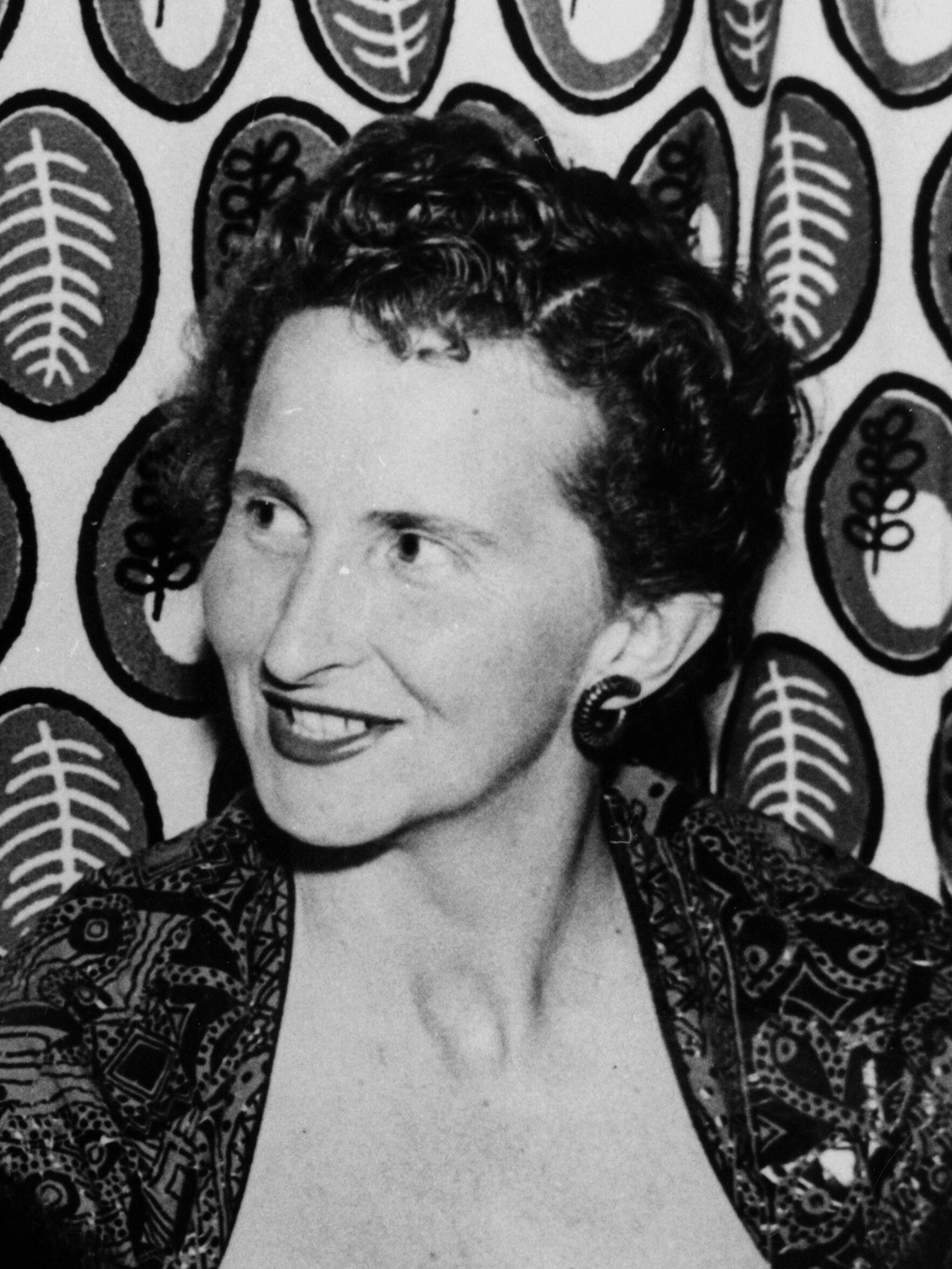
- Stafford in 1949
- Born: 10 June 1920; Melbourne, Australia
- Died: 23 June 2022 (aged 102); Gold Coast, Queensland, Australia
- Occupation(s): Fashion designer, businesswoman
- Known for: Introducing the bikini to Australia
- Spouse: Beverley Ralph Stafford (m. 1943)
- Children: 4

Paula Stafford OAM (10 June 1920 – 23 June 2022) was an Australian fashion designer credited with introducing the bikini to Australia. Graeme Potter, director of Queensland Museum South Bank, called her "Australia's original bikini designer".

== Early life ==
Stafford was born in Melbourne in 1920. After school she studied dress design at Emily McPherson School of Domestic Economy, a part of Melbourne Technical College. She lived in Gold Coast, Queensland.

== Fashion ==
The bikini is generally credited to Louis Réard in 1946, but two-piece swimming costumes had existed before then. Stafford had been making them for herself since the 1930s, but only gradually turned this into a business. In the 1940s, wartime shortages led to a desire to save fabric, which led to costumes becoming more skimpy. When somebody saw her self-made costume on the beach in Gold Coast and asked to buy one, she began selling them. Her styles became popular in Gold Coast and in Melbourne. She began manufacturing operations with a machinist working in her attic, but later built a factory, and opened a shop, called the Tog Shop, and also sold mail-order. The firm also expanded into leisurewear for men and women. She sold her clothes to stores including British retailers Selfridges and Liberty of London, and in Australia Myers, Georges, Buckleys, and David Jones. She also founded a modelling agency and a hotel.

In a famous incident in 1952, model Ann Ferguson was asked to leave a beach in Surfers Paradise because her outfit was too revealing; she was wearing a Paula Stafford bikini.

In 1993, Paula Stafford was awarded a Medal of the Order of Australia in the General Division for service to the fashion industry.

Her work is on display at the Gold Coast Historical Society museum in Bundall, Queensland. It was also displayed in an exhibition of swimwear at the Queensland Museum South Bank in 2010. She was awarded Gold Coast City Council's "Legend Award" in 2012.

== Personal life ==
In 2010, Stafford's autobiography, Bikini: The Paula Stafford story, was published, co-written with Ali McGovern. In 2013, Stafford was inducted into the Queensland Business Leaders Hall of Fame. She turned 100 on 10 June 2020 and died on 23 June 2022, aged 102, in Gold Coast, Queensland, Australia.

The State Library of Queensland holds Paula Stafford's personal collection, Stafford was an impressive record keeper, with seemingly every new business venture, every new ad campaign, and every new swimsuit documented extensively. In 2013 a digital story was created by the State Library of Queensland interviewing Stafford. In the video Stafford discusses dressmaking and the development and success of her business. Paula talks about the bikini and how it launched her Surfers Paradise business; the development of the business; building business around her family; her unique business model; the Gold Coast and tourism; becoming an international brand and drawing international publicity; being a proud Queenslander.
