= Yeronga State School =

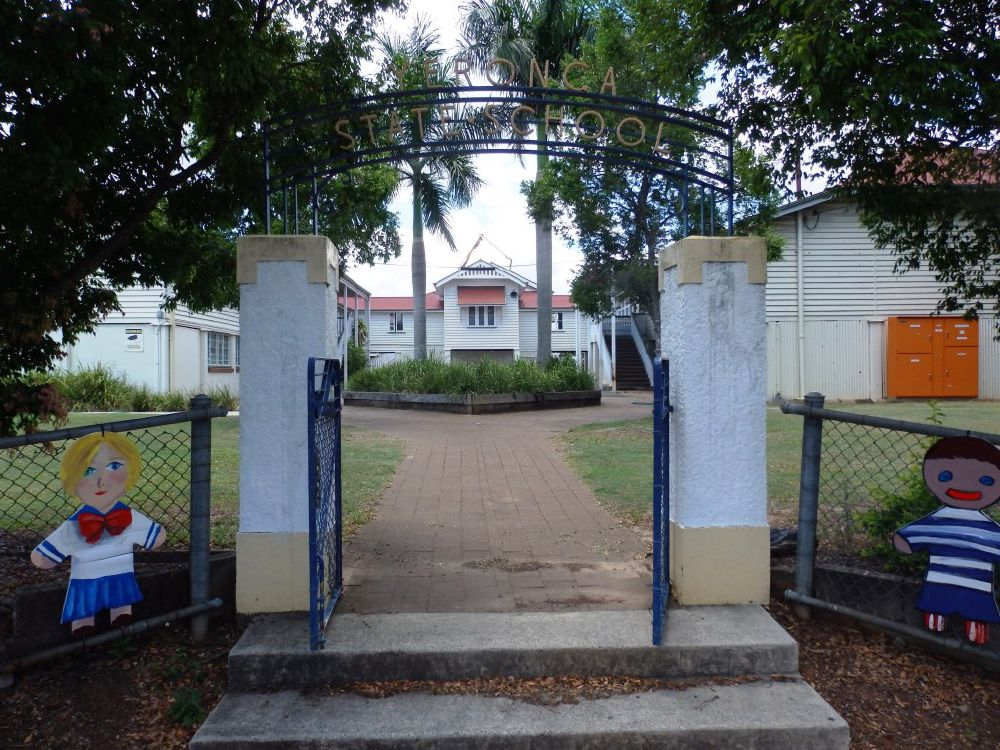
- Entrance gateway, Park Road, 2016

- Location within Queensland
- 27.5198°S 153.0207°E
- Location: 150 Park Road, Yeronga, City of Brisbane, Queensland, Australia

History
- Design period: 1914–1919 (World War I)
- Built: 1892–1960

Site notes
- Architect(s): Department of Public Works (Queensland); Thomas Robert Gladwin; Boulton & Paul Ltd
- Architectural style: Art Deco

Queensland Heritage Register
- Official name: Yeronga State School
- Type: state heritage
- Designated: 11 March 2016
- Reference no.: 650025
- Type: Education, research, scientific facility: School-state
- Theme: Educating Queenslanders: Providing primary schooling

Yeronga State School is a heritage-listed state school at 150 Park Road, Yeronga, City of Brisbane, Queensland, Australia. Its buildings were designed by Department of Public Works (Queensland), Thomas Robert Gladwin and Boulton & Paul Ltd and built from 1892 to 1960. It was added to the Queensland Heritage Register on 11 March 2016.

== History ==
Yeronga State School opened in February 1871 as Boggo Primary School, to accommodate the growing population of a previously rural district on the southern outskirts of Brisbane. To serve the school's growing pupil numbers, extensions were made and buildings added to the site. Yeronga State School retains: four connected sectional school buildings that were constructed in three stages (1927, 1928 and 1933); a Depression-era brick infants school building (1941); and a Boulton & Paul pre-fabricated timber-framed building (1954) with Department of Public Works (DPW) designed extensions (1954 and 1958). The school buildings are set amongst landscaped grounds with mature shade trees, a decorative entrance gateway (1945), a forestry plot (established 1939) and sporting facilities. The school has been in continuous operation since establishment and has been a focus for the local community as a place for important social and cultural activity.

Historically part of an area called "Boggo", which ran from Dutton Park to Rocky Water Holes (later Rocklea, c. 1884), and which was part of the traditional lands of the Turrbal and Jagera people, Yeronga's development was spurred on by transport improvements. Development of the Darling Downs made the Ipswich Road the main route to the interior, and the initial rough track was surveyed in the 1860s. The first sales of Crown land in the Yeronga area, involving 154 acres (62.3ha), had taken place in 1854. Land use in the area moved towards dairying and crops, including arrowroot, cotton, sugar, corn and potatoes. To address the education needs of the predominantly rural community, Yeerongpilly School was opened in 1867 as a semi-private school. Classes took place in the Boggo Wesleyan Church. Attendance varied greatly and averaged below the minimum 30 pupils necessary for the Board of General Education to build a national school.

The provision of state-administered education was important to the colonial governments of Australia. National schools, established in 1848 in New South Wales, were continued in Queensland following the colony's creation in 1859. Following the introduction of the Education Act 1860, which established the Board of General Education and began standardising curriculum, training and facilities, Queensland's national and public schools grew from four in 1860 to 230 by 1875. The State Education Act 1875 provided for free, compulsory and secular primary education and established the Department of Public Instruction.

The establishment of schools was considered an essential step in the development of early communities and integral to their success. Locals often donated land and labour for a school's construction and the school community contributed to maintenance and development. Schools became a community focus, a symbol of progress, and a source of pride, with enduring connections formed with past pupils, parents, and teachers.

By the early 1870s, an increasingly prosperous local community had been established in the Yeronga area, comprising predominantly farmers and merchants. As attendance grew, Yeerongpilly School, which had been recognised as a provisional school in 1868, achieved national school status and was re-opened on its current site as Boggo Primary School in February 1871, with over 70 students enrolled. A new one-room timber school building and playshed were built for the re-opening of the school, which was located on the corner of what is now known as School Road and Park Road, Yeronga. By 1876 the school was known as Boggo State School, as a result of the State Education Act 1875. In 1878–79 an additional timber school building was constructed that could accommodate 80 pupils.

With the arrival of the Corinda–Yeerongpilly railway line (Corinda to South Brisbane via Yeronga) in 1884, improved access led to increasing urbanisation in the area. Yeronga developed as a prestigious riverside suburb, with the large homes of wealthy settlers surrounded by the original farms, and Boggo State School was renamed Yeronga State School in 1886. That year a head teacher's residence was built on the west side of the school, which occupied a 20-acre (8.1ha) site bordered to the north and east by a recreation reserve (reserved 1882, later Yeronga Park). The school's site was officially designated a Reserve for a State School in 1895.

An important component of Queensland state schools was their grounds. The early and continuing commitment to play-based education, particularly in primary school, resulted in the provision of outdoor play space and sporting facilities, such as ovals and tennis courts. Also, trees and gardens were planted to shade and beautify schools. Arbor Day celebrations began in Queensland in 1890. Aesthetically designed gardens were encouraged by regional inspectors, and educators believed gardening and Arbor Days instilled in young minds the value of hard work and activity, improved classroom discipline, developed aesthetic tastes, and inspired people to stay on the land. Tree planting events were reported at Yeronga State School as early as April 1892, when ten camphor laurels and silky oaks were planted during a gathering of over 200 parents and children. By 1894, Arbor Day was celebrated as a general holiday for Yeronga students, with entertainment organised by the Yeronga State School Committee.

Yeronga, like many riverside suburbs in Brisbane, was significantly affected by the flood of 1893. Residences were inundated and the school was used as a refuge for flood victims. The flood led to a loss of confidence in the lower lying areas of Yeronga and resulted in reduced housing development until the beginning of the 20th century, when improved public transport led to further settlement and the area became predominantly working class. Attendance at Yeronga State School continued to steadily increase despite the floods and the economic depression of the 1890s. However, building at Yeronga State School was halted and did not resume until 1914, when a new open-air annexe was constructed to a standard DPW design.

To help ensure consistency and economy, the Queensland Government developed standard plans for its school buildings. From the 1860s until the 1960s, Queensland school buildings were predominantly timber-framed, an easy and cost-effective approach that also enabled the government to provide facilities in remote areas. Standard designs were continually refined in response to changing needs and educational philosophy and Queensland school buildings were particularly innovative in climate control, lighting, and ventilation. Standardisation produced distinctly similar schools across Queensland with complexes of typical components.

Plans for the new 1914 open-air annexe show it had a single 22-by-44-foot (6.7 m × 13.4 m) classroom and a teachers' room off the west-facing 10-foot (3.0 m) verandah. The new hip-roofed annexe was connected to the northeast corner of the existing T-shaped timber school building, with the playshed situated to the northwest.

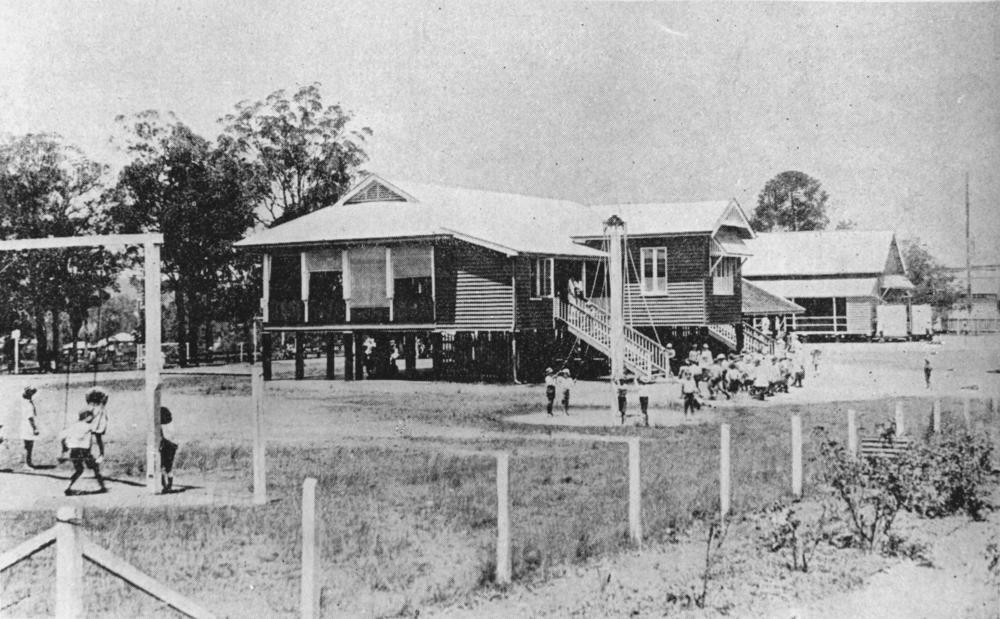
The playground at Yeronga State School, 1923

Enrolments continued to increase at Yeronga State School, from 236 in 1914, to 260 in 1916, and 325 by 1917. Population growth in the area was facilitated by the extension of the Ipswich Road tramway line to Yeronga Park, in 1915. In March 1917, the school grounds were reduced to just over 15 1/2 acres (6.3ha) when excised land to the north was amalgamated into Yeronga Park. In June that year a delegation from the Yeronga State School Committee appealed to the Minister for Public Instruction for the immediate construction of an infants' school. An additional open-air annexe was subsequently built to the north of the playshed at a cost of £1,156 and officially opened in May 1918. The new annexe had a Dutch-gable roof and was 24 by 64 feet (7.3 m × 19.5 m) with a 10-foot (3.0 m) wide verandah, teacher's room and hat room, and lavatories and a play area underneath.

Between 1927 and 1933 four sectional school buildings were added to Yeronga State School, to address further increases in attendance during the 1920s, with 900 enrolled in 1927. The new school buildings occupied higher ground to the north of the existing school site that had previously been used as sports grounds.

Attention to improving light and ventilation to achieve an optimum classroom had culminated in 1920 with the sectional school, a high-set timber structure. This fundamentally new design combined all the best features of previous types and implemented theories of an ideal education environment. It proved very successful and was used unaltered until 1950. This type was practical, economical, and satisfied educational requirements and climatic needs. Most importantly, it allowed for the orderly expansion of schools over time.

Before the sectional school, solar orientation was not given prominence and all school buildings were orientated in relation to the street and property boundaries, often resulting in poorly orientated buildings. The sectional school type had only one verandah, typically on the northern side, allowing the southern wall, with a maximum number of windows, to be unobstructed. The building was designed so that the blank western wall was removable. As the school grew, the western end wall could be detached and the building extended in sections, hence the name. This led to the construction of long narrow buildings of many classrooms - a distinctive feature of Queensland schools.

The first sectional school building at Yeronga was officially opened November 1927. The building (known as Block C in 2015) had a Dutch-gable roof and was aligned approximately east–west; it consisted of five classrooms, 21 by 18 feet (6.4 m × 5.5 m), with 8-foot (2.4 m) wide verandahs to the north, east and west sides. The classrooms were linked by folding partitions, which could be opened to create an assembly hall. A teachers' room projected off the northern verandah, and the northeast and northwest verandah corners were enclosed. Additional teachers' rooms off the east and west verandahs were evident by 1929; however, they were not documented in the 1926 plan. Block C cost £2,346 and could accommodate 200 pupils; it was intended as the central portion of a group of new buildings, with future extensions planned for all four corners, connected by verandah walkways.

In 1928, the two existing open-air annexes were relocated, extended and remodelled as sectional school buildings, and attached to the southwest (Block E – 1914 annexe, with 22-foot (6.7 m) wide classrooms and hipped roof) and southeast (Block B – 1918 annexe, with 24-foot (7.3 m) wide classrooms and Dutch-gable roof) corners of Block C. The buildings had five classrooms each, accessed via north-facing verandahs. At the official opening in November 1928, it was noted that the three new buildings could accommodate a total of 650 students. In 1929, overcrowding at Yeronga was further alleviated by the opening of Moorooka State School.

A fourth sectional school building (Block D) was officially opened as part of belated Jubilee celebrations for Yeronga State School in May 1933. Plans from 1932 show the building had a hipped roof and five classrooms, 21 by 18 feet (6.4 m × 5.5 m), separated by fixed partitions with centred double-leaf doors. The 8-foot (2.4 m) wide south-facing verandah had a hat room in the southwest corner and was connected to the northwest corner of Block C by a covered walkway. The understorey had concrete bracing walls positioned at all corners and in the centre. The building cost £1,723 and brought the total student accommodation of the sectional school buildings to 880. Enrolments at the time numbered 1,100 students, with the balance accommodated in the remaining buildings for infants on the old school site.

With the sectional school buildings occupying the site of the former sports grounds, efforts were made to provide alternative sporting facilities and improve the school grounds. In 1927 three acres of timber and stumps were cleared in preparation for a new oval in the northeast corner of the school grounds. In 1931, Yeronga State School was granted another acre of land, which included the eastern end of the oval, to be permanently reserved for State School purposes. The extended oval was officially opened in May 1933. A school swimming pool was excavated to the southwest of the oval; however, it was never completed. The school committee was responsible for much of the improvement works and concerts were held at the Ideal Picture Theatre in Yeronga to raise funds for Yeronga State School improvements fund. Labour under the Unemployment Relief Scheme was also utilised to assist with grounds improvements.

The Great Depression, commencing in 1929 and extending well into the 1930s, caused a dramatic reduction of building work in Queensland and brought private building work to a standstill. In response, the Queensland Government provided relief work for unemployed Queenslanders, and also embarked on an ambitious and important building program to provide impetus to the economy. Even before the October 1929 stock market crash, the Queensland Government initiated an Unemployment Relief Scheme, through a work program by the DPW. This included painting and repairs to school buildings. By mid-1930 men were undertaking grounds improvement works to schools under the scheme. Extensive funding was given for improvements to school grounds, including fencing and levelling ground for play areas, involving terracing and retaining walls. This work created many large school ovals, which prior to this period were mostly cleared of trees but not landscaped. These play areas became a standard inclusion within Queensland state schools and a characteristic element.

In June 1932 the Forgan Smith Labor Government came to power from a campaign that advocated increased government spending to counter the effects of the Depression. The government embarked on a large public works building program including government offices, schools and colleges; university buildings; court houses and police stations; hospitals and asylums; and gaols. Most were designed in a classical idiom as this projects the sense of stability and optimism which the government sought to convey through the architecture of its public buildings.

In the late 1930s the focus of improvement initiatives at Yeronga State School shifted, to address the needs of the Infants' School to the south. Infant classes commenced in 1893 at five Queensland Schools but development was delayed by the 1890s Depression and infant classes were usually accommodated by adapting existing accommodation. Brick infant blocks were constructed at Windsor State School (1933), Morningside State School (1936) and Yeronga (1941).

The construction of substantial brick school buildings in prosperous or growing suburban areas and regional centres during the 1930s provided tangible proof of the government's commitment to remedy the unemployment situation. The Depression-era brick school buildings form a recognisable and important type, exhibiting many common characteristics. Frequently, they were two storeys above an open undercroft and built to accommodate up to 1000 students. They adopted a symmetrical layout and prominent central entry. Ideally, the classrooms would face south with the verandah or corridor on the north side, but little concession was made for this and almost all brick school buildings faced the primary boundary road, regardless of orientation. Classrooms were commonly divided by folding timber partitions and the undercroft, where one existed, was used as covered play space, storage, ablutions and other functions.

Despite their similarities, each Depression-era brick school building was individually designed by a DPW architect, which resulted in a wide range of styles and ornamental features being utilised within the overall set. These styles, which were derived from contemporary tastes and preferences, included: Arts and Crafts, typified by half-timbered gable-ends; Spanish Mission, with round-arched openings and decorative parapets; Art Deco, with monumental entrance, stylised and stepped decoration, and strong horizontal and vertical lines; and Neo-classical, with pilasters, columns and large triangular pediments. Over time, variations occurred in building size, aesthetic treatment, and climatic-responsive features. The Chief Architect during this period was Andrew Baxter Leven (1885–1966), who was employed by the Queensland Government Works Department from 1910 to 1951, and was Chief Architect and Quantity Surveyor from 1933 to 1951. The DPW architect involved in the design of Yeronga Infants' School was Thomas Robert Gladwin.

Yeronga's new brick infants school building (known as Block L in 2015) was opened by the Queensland Treasurer, Frank Cooper, on the 26 September 1941. Externally, Block L adopted a combination of Arts and Crafts and Art Deco-style decorative treatments, giving it a domestic quality quite different from the more imposing Neo-Classical style brick schools from the Depression-era. The symmetrically arranged single-storey building, above an undercroft, had a face brick exterior with rendered decorative elements, and featured a central projecting entrance bay to the front (south) elevation that had a stepped, rendered parapet. The Dutch-gable roof was clad with Tuscan tiles and featured a decorative central fleche with finial. On the first floor there were eight classrooms accessed by a central corridor that aligned east–west: four classrooms on the north side, 21 by 19 feet (6.4 m × 5.8 m), separated by panelled folding partitions; and four on the south side, 21 feet (6.4 m) wide, separated by fixed partitions with central doorways. Hat / cloak rooms were situated adjacent to the two internal stairwells. The building could accommodate 320 pupils and was approved in October 1940, with an anticipated cost of £10,139. The new building was situated in the southwest corner of the school grounds, to the north of the remaining 19th century school buildings, and a forestry plot had recently been established on the eastern boundary.

Forestry plots were the product of after-school agricultural clubs, introduced in 1923 at primary schools, under the "home project" scheme. School forestry plots were seen by the government as a way of educating the next generation about the economic and environmental importance of trees, as well as providing testing grounds for new species. The sale of timber grown in school plots provided an additional source of income for the school, and the plots themselves were an attractive feature of school grounds. The first school forestry plot was established at Marburg State Rural School in 1928, where 275 exotic and indigenous trees were planted.

The Yeronga State School Forestry Club was formed in May 1939. A plot was cleared and holes were dug eight feet apart in preparation for the first Club Day on June 25, 1939, when the trees were planted. In November 1939 there were 168 native trees in the forestry plot; and 200 exotic pine trees (three main varieties) by 1950. Each child was assigned a pine tree to care for and had their name on a board nailed to the tree.

Like many Queensland state schools, Yeronga was affected by the outbreak of World War II. Due to the fear of a Japanese invasion, the Queensland Government closed all coastal state schools in January 1942, and although most schools reopened on 2 March 1942, student attendance was optional until the war ended. The closed schools were sometimes occupied for defence purposes, and some schools remained closed "for special reasons" after the rest had reopened. Yeronga Park was occupied by the United States Army and Australian Army - and later, by women from the Netherlands East Indies Army - from 1942, and the Yeronga Infants School was closed to pupils and occupied by the Australian Army as part of a Bulk Issue Petroleum Oil Depot (BIPOD) in Yeronga Park from March 1942 to May 1944. The Australian Army also requisitioned the southern part of the school grounds in 1945.

Slit trenches, for protecting the students from Japanese air raids, were also dug at Queensland state schools, often by parents and staff. By February 1942, 240 feet (73 m) of trenches had been fully excavated at Yeronga state school, with another 420 feet (130 m) half done. By May 1944 the military had vacated the Infants' School, which was subsequently prepared for re-occupation by school children. Other works to the school at this time included: toilet blocks with concrete walls and metal roof vents, constructed under Block B (southeast corner) and Block E (southwest corner); and a decorative gate with iron "Yeronga State School" nameplate and rendered columns added to the Park Road entrance in 1945.

The post-World War II period was a time of enormous population growth Australia-wide and was accompanied by a shortage of building materials. The Department of Public Instruction was largely unprepared for the enormous demand for state education that began in the late 1940s and continued well into the 1960s. This was a nationwide occurrence resulting from the unprecedented population growth now termed the "baby boom". Queensland schools were overcrowded and, to cope, many new buildings were constructed and existing buildings were extended.

At Yeronga State School, additional classrooms were required to accommodate the growth in pupil numbers. In 1954 a timber Boulton & Paul Building was constructed to the southeast of the sectional school buildings. Responding to materials shortages and the pressures of the baby boom, the DPW imported a British prefabricated building system from manufacturers Boulton & Paul Ltd of Norwich. Based on an 8-foot (2.4 m) planning and construction module, the prefabricated elements in the Boulton & Paul system included wall panels, ceiling panels, roof trusses and banks of awning windows. The buildings were constructed at many schools across Queensland between 1952 and 1958.

Boulton & Paul buildings were timber-framed and clad, had a verandah as circulation, and a gable roof. Ideally, they were orientated so the verandah faced north and the classroom faced south but were also added as extensions to existing buildings regardless of orientation. The building could be high or low-set and had extensive areas of timber-framed awning windows, providing more glazing than had ever been used in Queensland classrooms; almost the entirety of the verandah wall and the opposite classroom wall were glazed, providing excellent natural ventilation and lighting. The classrooms were 24 by 24 feet (7.3 m × 7.3 m), larger than most previous classrooms. The flexibility of the system meant that the number of classrooms constructed could vary to suit the needs of a particular school.

The highset Boulton & Paul building at Yeronga State School (known as Block F in 2016) was situated southeast of Block E, orientated at an angle to the sectional school buildings. Glazed screens were located at each end of the northern verandah, including along the covered walkway that connected to Block E. The walls were constructed from prefabricated units, 4 feet (1.2 m) wide, with those on the north and south sides containing large areas of windows. Units were pre-clad with chamferboards, with the edge of vertical timber boards between each unit visible on the exterior of the first floor. The understorey was enclosed with continuous chamferboards to the south and west, and had bracing fins. The three 24-by-24-foot (7.3 m × 7.3 m) classrooms were separated by fixed partitions, with wide folding doors (DPW Standard) to the west and a single-leaf door to the east.

As the school population continued to rise, more classrooms were required. Extensions to Block F were made in 1954 with two classrooms added to its eastern end. This extension was designed by the DPW to match the Boulton & Paul section, and illustrates the influence that the Boulton & Paul buildings had upon subsequent school building designs. Immediately after their introduction, DPW developed a standard building, which was similar to the Boulton & Paul building but was constructed in the traditional manner. DPW standard drawings included options for lowset and highset structures on piers, as well as elevated structures on floor trusses. These types adopted many of the Boulton & Paul design features, such as a covered play space under the classrooms and the extensive areas of glazing, but became permanent structures. These architectural features became characteristic of a class of building which was the dominant school type constructed in the 1950s.

The 1954 extension was highset on piers and was distinguishable from the Boulton & Paul section of Block F by its continuous chamferboard cladding to both understorey and first floor. The glazed screen at the eastern end of the Boulton & Paul building was removed to facilitate the continuous north-facing verandah, which was accessed by enclosed stairs at the eastern end of the extension. There was extensive glazing to the north and south walls. The two 24-by-24-foot (7.3 m × 7.3 m) classrooms were separated by a fixed partition with a single-leaf door at the southern end.

In 1958 the building was extended again to the east end of the DPW building, with a floor plan that diverted to align parallel with the sectional school buildings. This extension was similar to the design of the earlier DPW section but was elevated on timber floor trusses that provided open space underneath. It comprised two 21-by-24-foot (6.4 m × 7.3 m) classrooms, a teachers' room and a store room to the first floor. The 8-foot (2.4 m) wide verandah had a balustrade of hat and bag racks that were clad with crimped iron, and stairs at the eastern end. The exterior was clad with chamferboards and there was extensive glazing to the first floor and understorey of the southern wall, and to the northern verandah wall. The concrete slab of the understorey was set lower than the earlier sections of Block F and was accessed by concrete steps.

Over the course of the school's history, buildings have been added and removed, and changes made to the school grounds to meet the school's requirements. In 1944 the playshed was demolished and in 1946 the early timber school building was sold and removed. In 1959 tennis courts were opened in the northwest corner of the grounds, adjacent to Honour Avenue. In 1971 a two-storey facebrick and chamferboard building (known as Block A in 2016) was built to the north of Block C and the residence was demolished; replaced by the large brick Dental Therapists' Training Centre in 1974. Other additions include: a tuckshop, covered play area and activities hall to the south of Block F; a substantial Early Childhood Development Program centre and prep-school buildings to the east of Block L; and a war memorial and gate to Honour Avenue situated northwest of the oval.

The sectional school buildings, Blocks B, C, D and E, have been subject to additions and interior reconfigurations but remain fairly intact externally. In 1958 the gable-roofed northern teachers' room was extended to include an additional staff room and hallway. In 1960 each of the four sectional school buildings were reconfigured from five classrooms to four, and the verandah walls were demolished and rebuilt as louvres over shelves; existing studs were retained where possible. The stairs to Block D and E were also repositioned and bag rack balustrades were added to the verandahs, which were subsequently enclosed with awning windows sometime after 1971. Flat-sheeted ceilings were also added; however, it is possible the original coved ceilings, tie rods and latticed vents remain above. Further remodelling of the interiors was undertaken in 2000 when large openings were created in the former verandah walls and classrooms were reconfigured in Block B (four classrooms), D and E (three classrooms). An external lift was added to the east of the link between Block B and Block C in 2016.

The Boulton & Paul buildings with DPW extensions, Block F, remains fairly intact externally apart from enclosure of the verandahs to the 1954 sections with awning windows and crimped-metal cladding to the western wall. In the late 1990s large openings were formed in the verandah walls of 1954 sections and some classroom partitions were relocated; however, boards fixed to the ceiling indicate the former partition locations. The Boulton & Paul section has been reconfigured from three classrooms to two classrooms and a kitchenette. The verandah wall windows of the western classroom in the 1958 section have been replaced with modern louvres and modern partitions have been added to form offices.

Changes to the brick infants' school building, Block L, have been minor and the exterior remains substantially intact. Some external doors have been replaced and a room has been built in the undercroft with modern face brick. On the first floor, the former hat and cloak areas adjacent to the stairwells have been replaced with classroom and storage spaces. Original folding partitions between the northern classrooms have been removed but remaining bulkheads and returns demonstrate the former layout. Doorways have been inserted at either end of the central corridor and large openings have been created in two of the southern classroom walls to the corridor. Offices with modern partitions have been built in the former northeast classroom.

In 2016, the Yeronga State School continues to operate from its original site. The school is important to the area as a focus for the community, and generations of students have been taught there. Since establishment, Yeronga State School has been a key social focus for its community with the grounds and buildings having been the location of many social events.

== Description ==
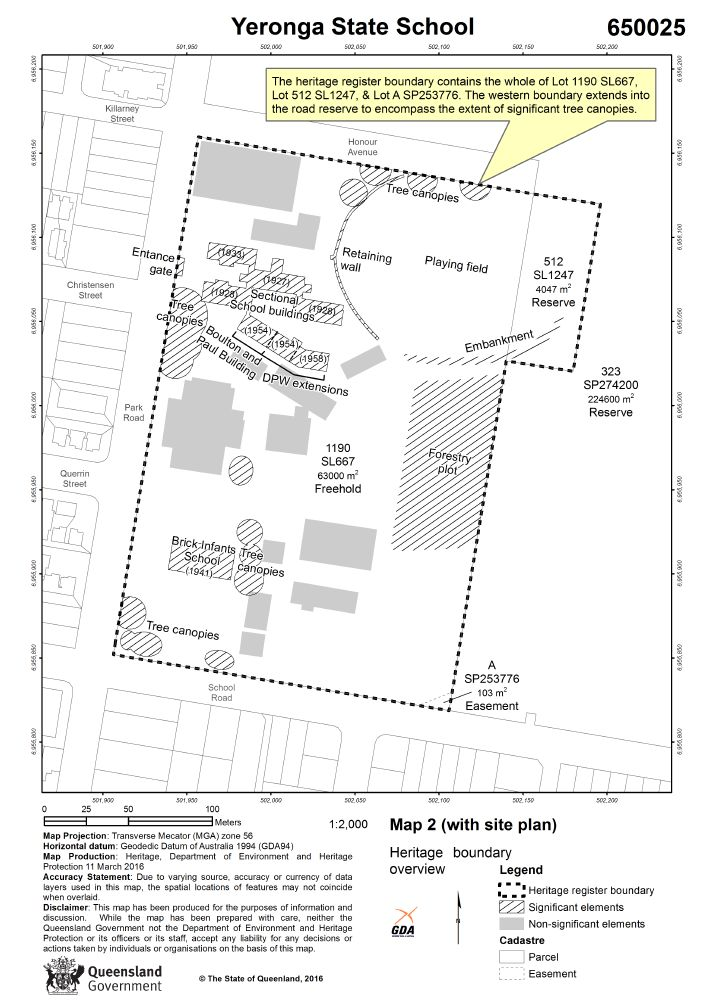
Site plan, 2016

Yeronga State School occupies a 6.7ha site within Yeronga, a residential suburb approximately 6 kilometres (3.7 mi) south of the Brisbane CBD. The school is located on the corner of Park Road and School Road, and is bounded to the north by Honour Avenue, and to the northeast and east by Yeronga Park and the Yeronga Pool complex. The site is divided (by a modern brick Dental School building) into two areas, with the 1920s-50s timber school buildings (Blocks B, C, D, E & F) on the northern part of the site, facing Park Road; and the brick Infants' School building (Block L) on the southern part of the site, set back from and facing School Road. With its decorative entrance gate on Park Road, mature perimeter trees, and range of timber and brick buildings, the school makes an important visual contribution to the streetscape. The school complex also comprises a sports oval in the northeast corner of the site, the remnants of a forestry plot on the eastern boundary, and a variety of mature shade trees that are mostly positioned along the site boundary, sports oval perimeter, and to the east of the Infants School.

=== 1927–1933 sectional school buildings (Blocks B, C, D and E) ===
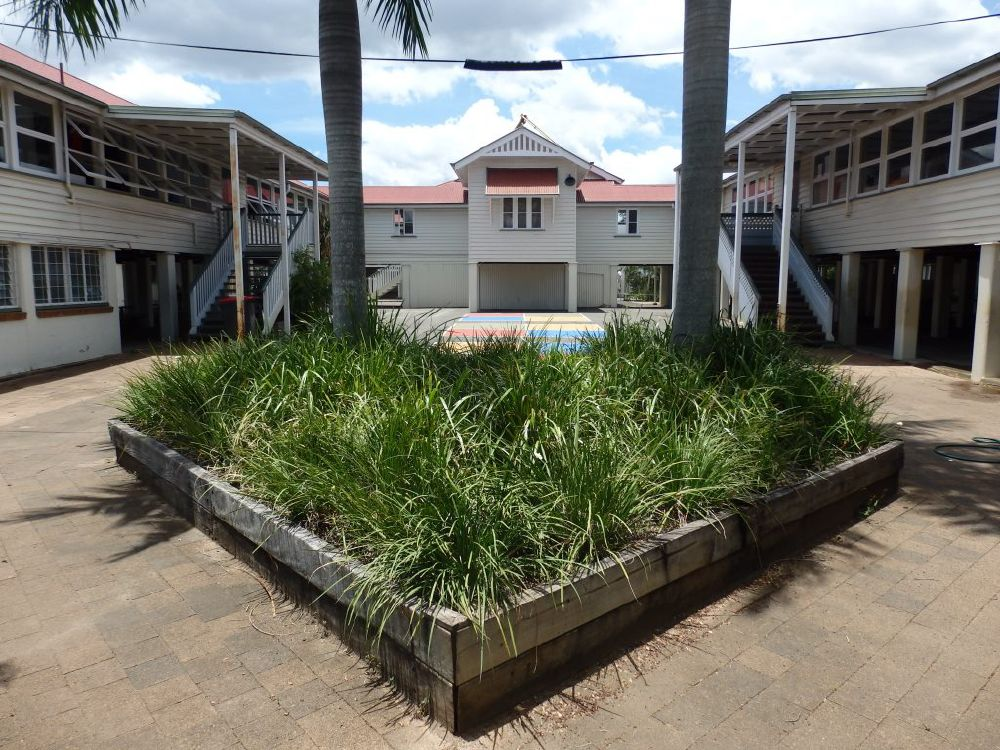
Sectional school buildings, from left to right: Block D, Block C, Block E, 2016

The four sectional school buildings are set back from Park Road and are aligned approximately east–west. The buildings are timber-framed and weatherboard-clad structures, highset on concrete piers, with corrugated metal-clad hipped (Blocks D and E) and Dutch-gable (Blocks C and B) roofs.

The buildings were constructed in three phases between 1927 and 1933 (Block C, centre; Block B, southeast and Block E, southwest; and Block D, northwest) and are connected via enclosed verandah walkways. The north-facing (Block B, C and E) and south-facing (Block D) verandahs are enclosed by bag rack balustrades (Block B, C and E) and modern awning windows, and are accessed by external timber stairs. The remodelled open-air annexe buildings (Blocks B and E) have wider classrooms and verandahs than the other sectional school buildings.

A range of early timber joinery is retained throughout the buildings including the large banks of casement windows with fanlights in the southern walls, which demonstrate the original five-classroom room layouts. East and west end walls are windowless. The interior walls and raked verandah ceilings are lined with timber v-jointed (VJ) tongue-and-groove (T&G) boards.

Windows in the former verandah walls have been removed and large openings have created an open-plan arrangement between the former verandah and classroom spaces. Classroom layouts have been reconfigured and original partitions removed; however, some partitions and bulkheads remain to demonstrate the former layout. The classroom ceilings have been lowered and lined with flat sheeting (1960).

The understories combine open areas for play, and enclosed areas with a variety of concrete, corrugated metal and weatherboard-clad partitions that form storage areas and toilet blocks (1945). The concrete slab floors have perimeter surface drains.

Elements not of cultural significance include modern additions and alterations such as: extensions and enclosures; carpet and linoleum floor linings; sheeted ceilings; added partitions; and joinery, fixtures and fittings.

==== 1927 Central Block (Block C) ====
Block C has verandahs to the north, east and west sides, all of which are enclosed. The interior contains four classrooms defined by part and full-width partitions (1960). Remnants of the four original partitions survive as bulkheads that demonstrate the original layout.

Teachers' rooms are attached to the north, east and west sides of Block C; they are gable-roofed and weatherboard-clad, and feature skillion window hoods with timber brackets. The east and west-facing teachers' rooms have casement windows with fanlights, and battened gable infills. The interior walls and flat ceilings of all three teachers' room are lined with VJ, T&G boards. The northern teachers' room has been extended (1958) with a staff room and hallway added, windows reconfigured and modern louvres added.

The understorey of the extended northern teachers' room is enclosed with weatherboard-clad walls (1958). The southwest corner of the understorey is clad with corrugated metal sheeting. A modern covered walkway links Block C to Block A to the north.

==== 1928 Southeast Block (Block B) ====
Block B contains four classroom spaces, with fixed partitions defining the two eastern classrooms, and the two western classrooms divided by wide-leaf folding doors (1960). One fixed partition remains in its original location between the eastern and western classrooms.

The Dutch-gable roof has louvred vents in the gable ends.

The western end of the understorey has been enclosed with concrete walls and glass louvres (1945) to form a toilet block.

==== 1928 Southwest Block (Block E) ====
Block C contains three classrooms divided by a fixed partition to the east and folding doors to the west (1960). One fixed partition remains in its original location between the central and eastern classrooms.

The southwest corner of the understorey is clad with corrugated metal sheeting and the eastern end is enclosed with the concrete walls and glass louvres of a former (1945) toilet block. A metal extraction vent (1950) protrudes from the southwest corner of the hipped roof.

A covered walkway with timber screen (1954) connects with Block F to the southeast.

==== 1933 Northwest Block (Block D) ====
Block D contains three classrooms divided by fixed partitions. One partition between the central and eastern classrooms is in its original location.

Concrete bracing walls are located between piers at the corners and centre of the understorey. The western end has been enclosed.

=== 1954–58 Boulton & Paul building and DPW extensions (Block F) ===
Block F is a long, highset, timber-framed building with a gable roof clad in corrugated metal sheeting. It comprises: a 1954 Boulton & Paul (B&P) section at the western end (two classrooms and kitchenette); a 1954 DPW-designed section in the centre (two classrooms); and a 1958 DPW-designed section at the eastern end (one classroom, a teachers' room and store room, and modern offices). The plan form is angled, with the 1954 sections diverting southeast from the sectional school buildings, and the 1958 section returning to parallel (east-west). A verandah continues the length of the northern side of the building, accessed by three sets of timber stairs (1954 B&P and DPW stairs attached-to, and 1958 stairs set-within, the verandah).

The exterior is clad in timber chamferboards, including the southern and western sides of the understorey. The B&P section is clearly distinguishable from the DPW sections by the breaking up of the external cladding by the edges of vertical timber boards between each panel of the prefabricated wall units on the first floor. Large areas of timber awning windows with fanlights line the southern wall of each section; timber brackets supporting the overhanging eaves are attached to the mullions. The end walls of the classroom level are windowless - the western end being clad with crimped metal sheeting. The stairs to the 1954 DWP section are clad with weatherboards and feature a glazed timber screen that is similar to the original B&P timber screen with square glass panes that survives on the western side of the covered walkway to Block E.

The verandah has timber floors and large sections of bag rack balustrades that are clad with weatherboard (B&P section) and crimped metal sheeting (DPW extensions). The verandah of the B&P section and part of the 1954 DWP extension is enclosed with modern awning windows above the bag racks, and external metal-louvred screens. Double-hung sash windows, with fanlights, are retained in the verandah walls of non-enclosed sections, with the exception of the 1958 western classroom, where they have been replaced with modern louvres. Large openings have been formed in the former verandah walls of the 1954 sections, creating an open-plan arrangement between the verandah and classrooms.

The interior of the B&P section is lined with panels of flat sheeting, with cover strips, on the walls and ceiling. Vertical members of the structural system are evident on the south wall, between pairs of windows. The classroom layout has been reconfigured (formerly three classrooms) and original partitions removed; however, their former location is evident in the ceiling linings. Non-significant interior elements include modern partitions, cupboards, wall and floor linings, and kitchenettes.

A large opening has been created in the classroom wall between the B&P and central DWP sections. The interior of the DPW section is similar to the B&P section, but without the expressed wall structure on the south wall. The southern windows are also set slightly (170 millimetres (6.7 in)) lower than those in the B&P section.

The interior of the eastern DPW section is lined with flat sheeting, with cover strips; excluding the former western classroom, which has been substantially altered including the re-lining of the walls and addition of modern partitions to form offices.

The understorey combines open play space and enclosed areas for teaching and storage; it has a concrete floor that steps down at the junction between the 1954 and 1958 sections. The floor structure of the classrooms above is exposed; the bearers of the 1954 sections are supported on concrete piers, while the 1958 section has open timber trusses. Awning windows, with fanlights and a continuous flat hood, are set between the trusses on the southern wall of the 1958 section and modern louvres enclose the northern side. The open play area under the B&P section retains original timber bracing fins either side of an opening in the southern, single-skin wall.

=== 1941 Brick Infants' School building (Block L) ===
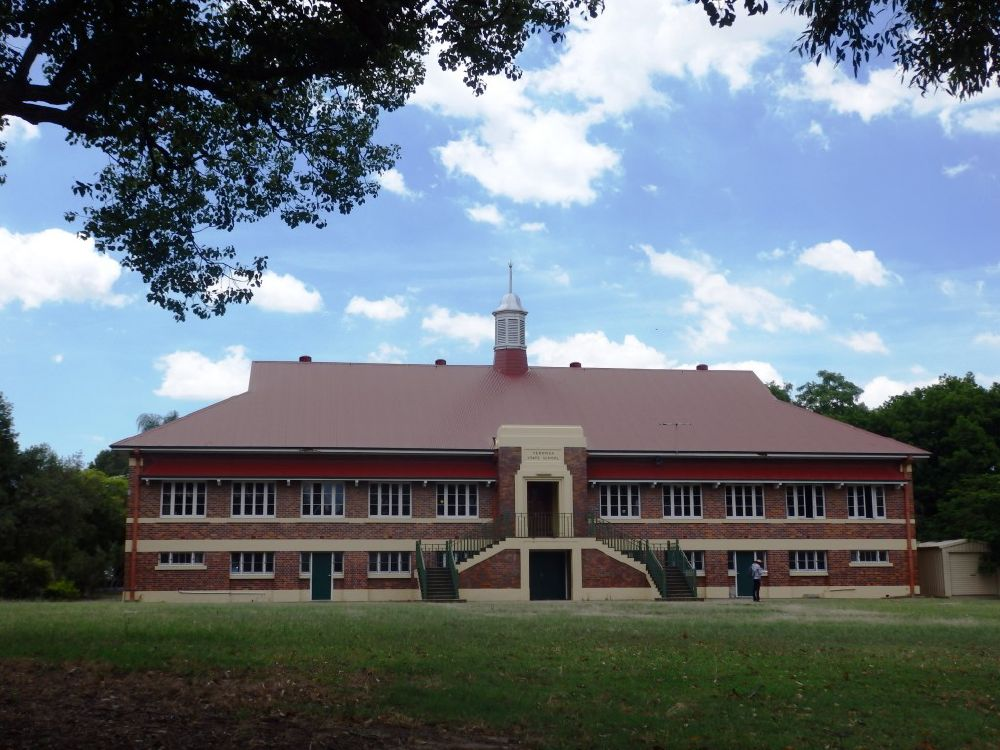
Brick infants school building (Block L), 2016

Block L is a symmetrical, masonry structure of one storey above an undercroft level. The building is orientated east–west and faces School Road; set back behind an open playing field with perimeter trees. The building is rectangular in plan and a projecting entrance bay, flanked by twin stairs to a first-floor landing, is centred on the southern (front) elevation. A tall fleche with decorative finial prominently projects above the Dutch-gabled roof, which has been clad with modern corrugated-metal sheeting.

The building is elegantly composed and ornamented with a combination of Arts and Crafts and Art Deco-style decorative treatments. The face brick is primarily red-brown and has contrasting rendered plinth, windowsills and stringcourses. The projecting entrance bay features a stepped, rendered parapet and doorway surround, with the words "YERONGA STATE SCHOOL" below. This Art Deco-style detailing is repeated on the two entrances to the undercroft, at either end of the northern (rear) elevation. The front entrance stairs have concrete treads and decorative metal balustrade with square metal posts; rendered stringers contrast with the face brick base. Along the front and rear elevations, continuous window hoods with Arts and Crafts-style decorative timber brackets shelter the first storey windows. Windows openings are regularly spaced and contain banks of timber-framed, three-light casement windows, with fanlights above.

The interior layout of the building is symmetrical with first-floor classrooms arranged either side of a central corridor that aligns east–west, between two internal stairwells. A perpendicular entrance hall, flanked by a current and former teachers' room, connects to the central landing. The four southern classrooms retain original partitions, although one large opening has been formed between two rooms and walls have been removed between the east and west end classrooms and the corridor. The northern classrooms have been reconfigured to accommodate a kitchenette and some offices but retain original partition bulkheads, which demonstrate the former layout. Modern doors are located at both ends of the corridor and hat rooms adjacent to the stairwells have been partially enclosed for storage space. The stairs are concrete and have metal balustrades with timber handrails.

Internal walls are generally plaster-lined with simple skirtings, and classrooms retain timber picture rails. Original timber double-hung windows and double doors with large, three-light fanlights remain in the internal corridor walls. Ceilings are lined with flat sheeting and ornamented by timber battens forming a grid pattern. All classrooms retain their original latticed ceiling vents. Original timber double-hung windows and double doors with large, three-light fanlights remain in the internal corridor walls. A bronze plaque in the entrance reads "Opened 26 September 1941 by HA Bruce MLA".

Non-significant elements include modern carpet or linoleum floor linings, cupboards and kitchenettes, and added doors and partitions.

=== Landscape Elements, Grounds and Views ===
The grounds are well-established and contain mature trees including figs (Ficus spp.), camphor laurels (Cinnamomum camphora), poincianas (Delonix regia) and various eucalypts species. Large figs on the boundary enhance the school's prominence in its location and provide a picturesque setting for the school buildings. Several mature trees are situated to the east of Block L, and plantings associated with the former school residence include a mature mango tree (Mangifera spp.) to the east of the Dental Therapists Training Centre.

A decorative gateway (1945), with rendered columns and metal arch that reads "YERONGA STATE SCHOOL", frames the main pedestrian entrance from Park Road.

The generous playing field (1927–33) to the northeast of the school buildings comprises a level sporting oval with concrete retaining walls to the western end and an earth embankment with stone-pitched drain to the southeast. Mature figs frame the northwest perimeter of the oval, including the canopies of several trees that are part of adjacent Yeronga Park.

A forestry plot (established 1939), situated south of the oval, contains a range of mature trees including pines (Pinus spp.) and camphor laurels.

=== Other Structures ===
Other buildings, structures, sheds, footpaths and roads within the cultural heritage boundary are not of cultural heritage significance. Where the register boundary extends into road reserve, the road and footpath fabric is not considered to be of cultural significance.

== Heritage listing ==
Yeronga State School was listed on the Queensland Heritage Register on 11 March 2016 having satisfied the following criteria.

The place is important in demonstrating the evolution or pattern of Queensland's history.

Yeronga State School (established 1871 as Boggo Primary School) is important in demonstrating the evolution of state education and its associated architecture in Queensland. The place retains representative examples of standard government designs that were architectural responses to prevailing government educational philosophies; set in landscaped grounds with a decorative entrance gateway, assembly and play areas, sports oval, a remnant forestry plot and mature shade trees.

The four connected sectional school buildings (1927, 1928 and 1933) demonstrate the culmination of many years of experimental timber school design, providing equally for educational and climatic needs.

The Depression-era Brick Infants' School Building (1941) and formation of the sports oval (1927–33) are the result of the State Government's building and relief work programs during the Great Depression of the 1930s.

The Boulton & Paul Building (1954) demonstrates the introduction and adoption of imported prefabricated systems by the Queensland Government in response to acute building material shortages and population growth in the post-World War II period. The Department of Public Works (DPW) designed extensions (1954 and 1958) demonstrate the influence of Boulton & Paul Buildings on subsequent DPW school designs.

The forestry plot (established 1939) is important surviving evidence of a movement to convey the economic and environmental importance of forestry to students while creating an attractive landscape feature and income for schools.

The place is important in demonstrating the principal characteristics of a particular class of cultural places.

Yeronga State School is important in demonstrating the principal characteristics of Queensland state schools. These include: teaching buildings constructed to standard designs; and generous, landscaped sites, with mature trees, assembly and play areas, and sporting facilities. The school is a good, intact example of a suburban school complex, comprising the following building types.

The sectional school buildings are good examples of their type and are externally intact. Characteristics include: their highset form with play space beneath; blank end walls; northern verandahs, with linkages between buildings; large banks of south-facing windows, projecting teachers' rooms and early internal linings.

The Depression-era Brick Infants' School Building is a good, intact example of its type and retains a high degree of integrity. It demonstrates the principal characteristics of Depression-era Brick Schools, including: its symmetrically arranged form, with an undercroft; high-quality design with ornamental features from a variety of styles; face brick exterior; prominent central roof fleche; and projecting entrance bay.

The Boulton & Paul Building is a good, intact example of its type, and clearly demonstrates the characteristics of a prefabricated building through the expression of its modular construction in the external cladding. Other characteristic features of this type include: its timber-framed, lightweight construction; gable roof; verandah for circulation, with glazed screens at the ends; large areas of glazing to the south walls; flat internal wall linings; and timber bracing walls to the understorey. Designed to match the Boulton & Paul classrooms, the DPW-designed extensions are good, intact examples of their type and demonstrate two iterations of the DPW standard designs for highset timber school buildings: on concrete piers (1954); and incorporating timber floor trusses (1958).

The place is important because of its aesthetic significance.

Through its substantial size, high quality materials, face brick exterior, elegant formal composition and decorative treatment, the Depression-era Brick Infants' School Building at Yeronga State School has aesthetic significance due to its expressive attributes, which evoke the sense of progress and permanence that the Queensland Government sought to embody in new public buildings in that era.

The building is also significant for its streetscape contribution. Standing on an open corner site and framed by mature fig trees, it is an attractive and prominent feature of the area.

The place has a strong or special association with a particular community or cultural group for social, cultural or spiritual reasons.

Schools have always played an important part in Queensland communities. They typically retain significant and enduring connections with former pupils, parents, and teachers; provide a venue for social interaction and volunteer work; and are a source of pride, symbolising local progress and aspirations.

Yeronga State School has a strong and ongoing association with the surrounding community. It was established on its current site in 1871 through the fundraising efforts of the local community and generations of children have been taught there. The place is important for its contribution to the educational development of the community and is a prominent community focal point and gathering place for social and commemorative events with widespread community support.

== Notable students ==
- Jessica Margaret Anderson (née Queale), novelist
- Robin Gibson, architect
- Rhyl Hinwood, sculptor
- Norm Lee, politician
- John Pidgeon, contractor and property developer
