= Angela Mary Doyle =

Australian nun and hospital administrator (born 1925)

Angela Mary Doyle AO
- Born: Kathleen Doyle; 19 August 1925 (age 101); County Clare, Ireland
- Other name: Sister Angela Mary Doyle
- Education: Queensland University of Technology
- Years active: 1966–2003
- Employer: Mater Group
- Organisation: Sisters of Mercy
- Known for: Hospital administrator known for work during the HIV/AIDS crisis
- Notable work: Mercy, Mater and Me: Sister Angela Mary, A Memoir

Angela Mary Doyle, AO (born Kathleen Doyle, 19 August 1925) is an Irish Australian Catholic nun. She is well-known for her work as a hospital administrator in Brisbane and for her early advocacy for the support and care of Queenslanders with HIV/AIDS.

== Biography ==
Doyle was born in August 1925 in County Clare, Ireland. She was the fourth child in a poor farming family of nine children. As a child, she was unable to attend high school due to her family's financial constraints. At about 21, she approached her parents about wanting to take the veil. Her mother was initially against this decision, so she waited a year before approaching the matter again. Due to her lack of a high school education, she was turned away by two local convents. However, Sisters of Mercy in Brisbane had set up a house in Cork where they trained young women to join their order. Doyle applied and was accepted unseen. She attended the training school in Cork, learning the Australian curriculum and training to be a primary school teacher. In 1947, she travelled to Brisbane to join the Brisbane Sisters of Mercy there. She taught for six months, and then was dispatched to the Mater Misericordiae Hospital, Brisbane. Two years later, Doyle's sister joined her in Australia, though she worked as a music teacher.

In 1966, Doyle was appointed to be the Mater Misericodiae hospital administrator. Upon realizing she did not have the managerial background necessary for the position, she enrolled in the Queensland University of Technology, where she earned a degree in Business, majoring in Health Administration.

=== AIDS Epidemic ===
In the mid-1980's, during the height of the HIV/AIDS epidemic, Queensland premier Joh Bjelke-Petersen mandated that nobody should help HIV/AIDS patients. Seeing a lack of a response, Doyle reached out to the Deputy Director of Health to see if the Queensland AIDS Council (QuAC) would be interested in working with them. Doyle worked to educate herself about the disease, attending conferences throughout the world and teaching about HIV/AIDS at schools and in communities around Australia. The Sisters of Mercy provided the QuAC with housing in rental units they owned. They also provided QuAC with equipment, and medical personnel. When Bjelke-Petersen refused to pass funds from the Federal Health Department to QuAC, Doyle arranged a secret work-around through which funds went directly from the Federal Health Department to the Mercy Order, who forwarded the money to QuAC.

=== Later career ===
Doyle advocated for other marginalized groups in Australia as well. She nurtured a close relationship with the local Taiwanese community, serving as a medical resource for new immigrants. In particular, she worked closely with Tzu Chi. She also was a vocal advocate for Aboriginal and Torres Strait Islander health and welfare.

Doyle went on to work as the Senior Director of Health Services for the Mater complex and then served as the Executive Director of the Mater Hospital Trust from 1993 to 1997. In 1998, Doyle was instrumental in the founding of Mater Research. Doyle continued to serve on the Mater Board until 2003.

In 2010, Sister Angela Mary published her autobiography, Mercy, Mater & Me: Sister Angela Mary (A Memoir), with the University of Queensland Press.

In 2020, philanthropists Maha Sinnathamby and Bob Sharpless donated the Mater Family Wellbeing Unit, focused on postnatal depression, in honour of Doyle's 95th birthday.

== Awards and honours ==
- 1989: Queenslander of the Year
- 1990: Australian Achiever
- 1991: Griffith University, honorary award of Doctor of the University
- 1993: Order of Australia for services to hospital administration, community health and teaching health care services
- 2001: inaugural Queensland Greats award
- 2001: Centenary Medal for distinguished service to the community and the health industry
- 2009: Queensland Business Leaders Hall of Fame.
- 2017: Australian Catholic University, Brisbane, Award Honorary Doctorate
- 2020: University of Queensland, Doctor of the University honoris causa
