= ALS Limited =

Australian testing services company

- Traded as: ASX: ALQ
- Industry: Testing Services
- Founded: 1863
- Headquarters: Brisbane, Australia
- Number of locations: 350 sites, 70 countries, 6 continents (end 2022)
- Key people: Bruce Phillips (Chairman); Malcolm Deane (CEO, managing director)
- Services: Testing, Inspection, Certification, Verification
- Revenue: ▲ A$2.421 billion (2023)
- Net income: ▲ A$320 million (2023)
- Number of employees: ▲19,000 (2023)
- Divisions: Minerals, Life Sciences, Energy, Industrial
- Website: https://www.alsglobal.com/

ALS Limited (ASX: ALQ) is a company headquartered in Brisbane, Australia, which provides testing, inspection, certification, and verification services out of over 370 sites across 65 countries. In 2012, the company was inducted into the Queensland Business Leaders Hall of Fame.

== History ==
=== Campbell Brothers ===
The company now known as ALS was founded in Brisbane in 1863 by a Scottish immigrant, Peter Morrison Campbell as 'Campbell Brothers', a soap manufacturer located in the suburb of Kangaroo Point. In 1881, the business moved to a site at Bowen Hills where it operated for the following 100 years, producing various soaps and cleaning chemicals.

In 1952, the company was publicly floated and listed on the local stock exchange as 'Campbell Brothers Limited'.

In 2012, Campbell Brothers Limited was renamed 'ALS Limited', and has divested its former manufacturing businesses.

=== Australian Laboratory Services ===
ALS commenced laboratory testing operations in Brisbane as ‘Australian Laboratory Services' in 1976 as a privately owned company. The company initially provided analytical chemistry services for the oil shale and mineral exploration industries, and grew steadily in its first decade of operations. In 1981, Campbell Brothers acquired a controlling stake in Australian Laboratory Services, and purchased the remaining shares by the mid 1980s.

Following rapid growth and diversification across Australia in the 1980s, ALS expanded into Asia and South America in the 1990s, before expanding into North America, Africa, and Europe in the early 2000s and finally the Middle East in 2011.

ALS became one of the world's largest providers of laboratory analysis services to the minerals industry after acquiring North American mineral laboratory groups 'Chemex Labs' in December 1999, and 'Bondar Clegg' in December 2001. Between 2011 and 2017, ALS accelerated expansion into life sciences, adding services in pharmaceutical and health care, as well as food safety and quality testing.

== Operations ==
With more than 19,000 staff, ALS operates from over 350 locations in 70 plus countries throughout Australia, Asia, the Pacific, North America and South America, Europe, and Africa. The company is currently divided into several business streams:

- Life Sciences: Operates laboratories specialising in environmental monitoring, food and pharmaceutical, electronics, and consumer products market sectors.
- Commodities: Provides testing services for the global mining industry in service areas such as geochemistry, metallurgy, coal, mine site services and inspection. Mineral services cover the entire resource life-cycle from exploration, spectral mineralogy, feasibility, production, design, development through to trade, and finally rehabilitation.
- Industrial: Provides diagnostic testing and engineering services for the energy, resources, transportation and infrastructure sectors.
