= Dimity Dornan =

Australian speech pathologist, author and businesswoman

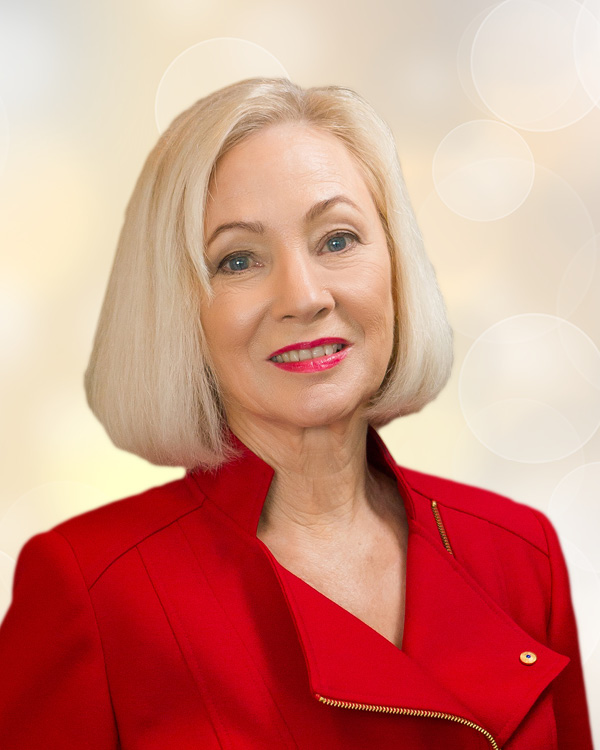
Dr Dimity Dornan AO

Dimity Dornan AO is a speech pathologist, author, social entrepreneur, bionics advocate, researcher, and businesswoman in Brisbane, Queensland, Australia. She is the founder of the Hear and Say Centre for Deaf Children on 6 July 1992 and helped initiate newborn hearing screening in Queensland hospitals, the first such program in Australia. She has received Australian of the Year for Queensland in 2003, and the Suncorp Queenslander of the Year in 2010. Griffith University offers a Dimity Dornan Hear and Say Master of Speech Pathology Scholarship for second year students who have an interest in paediatric speech pathology and working in a regional area.

== Career ==
Dornan was the first speech pathology graduate at the University of Queensland, and the first speech pathologist to work at the Royal Brisbane Hospital.

Dornan has been attributed for her ground-breaking auditory verbal work which has assisted families and hearing-impaired children throughout Queensland. Hear and Say is now a global Hearing Health Education and Development Program with six centres across Queensland, including a telepractice for remote regions of Queensland.

Dornan is the founder of Bionics Queensland (BioniQ) which was established to promote the development of the human bionic industry in Queensland.

Dornan is also the founder of Human Bionics Interface, which an international network of bionics researchers, clinicians, businesses that share projects to delivery bionics solutions.

Dornan retired from the role as Executive Director, Hear and Say, and moved into an ambassador role in 2022.

== Achievements ==
In 2017, Dornan was inducted into the Queensland Business Leaders Hall of Fame.

In October 2017, Dornan was elected to the University of Queensland Senate by the graduates of the university.

In 2003 she received Australian of the Year for Queensland, and in 2010 the Suncorp Queenslander of the Year.

== Criticism and controversy ==
In 2007, Dornan drew the ire of many in the Deaf community for labelling deafness as "a scourge" and for comparing advances in cochlear implants and hearing technology to the eradication of polio, with one Deaf writer describing Dornan's remarks as "vilification" and accusing her of promoting "cultural genocide".

== Awards ==
- Churchill Fellowship 1992
- Member of the Order of Australia 1998
- Fellow of Speech Pathology Australia 1999
- Australian Medical Association (AMA) Award for Distinction for Services to Medicine 1999
- Australian of the Year for Queensland 2003
- Ernst & Young Australian Social Entrepreneur of the Year 2005
- Suncorp Queenslander of the Year 2010
- University of Queensland Alumnus of the Year 2011
- Telstra Business Women’s Awards Business Woman of the Year for Queensland and White Pages Community and Government Award (2011)
- Queensland Greats 2013
- Dame of Honour 2013
- Order of St John of Jerusalem (Knights Hospitaller) 2013
- Officer of the Order of Australia 2014
- Lord Mayor's Business Awards, Lifetime Achievement Award 2014
- McCullough Robertson Life Sciences Queensland Industry Excellence Award 2015
- Women in Technology Life Sciences Award 2016
- Brisbane Women in Business Award (Innovation and Technology) 2016
- Women in Technology Life Sciences Outstanding Achievement Award 2016
- Women in Business Innovation and Technology Award 2016
- Queensland Business Leaders Hall of Fame 2017
- Queensland Senior Australian of the Year 2018
