= Benjamin Wickham MacDonald =

Benjamin Wickham MacDonald (1853–1920) was a company manager and shipping executive in Queensland, Australia.

Macdonald was once the Russian Empire consul for Queensland. He became the general manager of the Australasian United Steam Navigation Company and partner in shipping company, Macdonald Hamilton.

MacDonald has been attributed as having influenced the way Queensland's trade and export industry developed.

== Awards ==
- Queensland Business Leaders Hall of Fame, 2015
