= John Pidgeon =

Australian contractor and property developer (1926-2016)

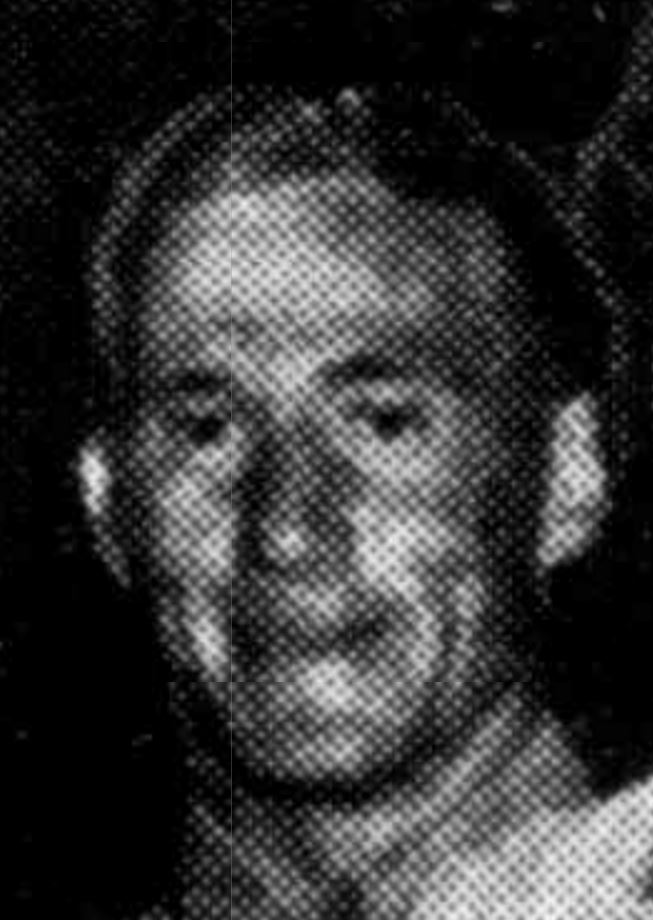
J. Pidgeon, 1949

Sir John Allan Stewart Pidgeon (15 July 1926 – 2 June 2016) was an Australian contractor and property developer. He and his sister, Valmai Pidgeon, have been involved with the Queensland construction industry since joining their father's business in the 1940s.

== Early life ==
Pidgeon was born on 15 July 1926 in Brisbane, the son of Frederick "Allan" Pidgeon and his wife Margaret, and the younger brother of sister Valmai. He attended Yeronga State School and the Anglican Church Grammar School ("Churchie").

== Career ==
Their father's business, F. A. Pidgeon and Son Pty Ltd started in 1927, and Pidgeon joined the family company in 1946 after service in the AIF. His addition to the company, along with his sister Valmai, soon expanded the company's activities throughout Queensland, notably in the hotel and commercial building market. The continued success of the company left its mark on the skyline of Brisbane and the Gold Coast.

Key construction projects undertaken by the company are: The Brisbane Club; Waterfront Place; the Brisbane Transit Centre; the Broadbeach Monorail; The Oasis Shopping Centre and Hotel; The Suncorp Metway Building; the Stradbroke and Macleay Towers – Dockside; Cathedral Square; 313 Adelaide Street; and the Bank of Queensland Building. Pidgeon's leadership style in pursuit of great construction projects has made him one of the most respected figures in Queensland's construction industry.

Pidgeon served the wider community as a committee member of the Queensland Cancer Fund, chairman of the Salvation Army Advisory Board, and the Red Shield Appeal, as well as chairing the Queensland Master Builders Association, the Builders Registration Board, and subsequently founding chairman of the Building Services Authority. His passion for lifesaving has led to continued support of the Surf Lifesaving Association over many years.

== Honours and awards ==
In recognition of his contribution to the construction industry and to the community, Pidgeon was awarded the title of Knight Bachelor on 24 June 1989. Pidgeon was the recipient of the Queensland University of Technology's Distinguished Constructor Award in 2002 and was inducted into the Construction Hall of Fame. In 2009 he was inducted into the Queensland Business Leaders Hall of Fame. In 2010, the Sir John Pidgeon Sports Complex was opened at the Anglican Church Grammar School, named in his honour. He was inducted into the Property Council's Australian Property Hall of Fame. Despite his many achievements, he claimed that his greatest achievement was his family.

== Later life ==
Pidgeon enjoyed snow skiing until he was 89 years old. He died on 2 June 2016 at his home in Brisbane. His funeral was held at St John's Cathedral in Brisbane on 13 June 2016.
