= Waterfront Place, Brisbane =

Office building in the Brisbane central business district in Queensland

Waterfront Place
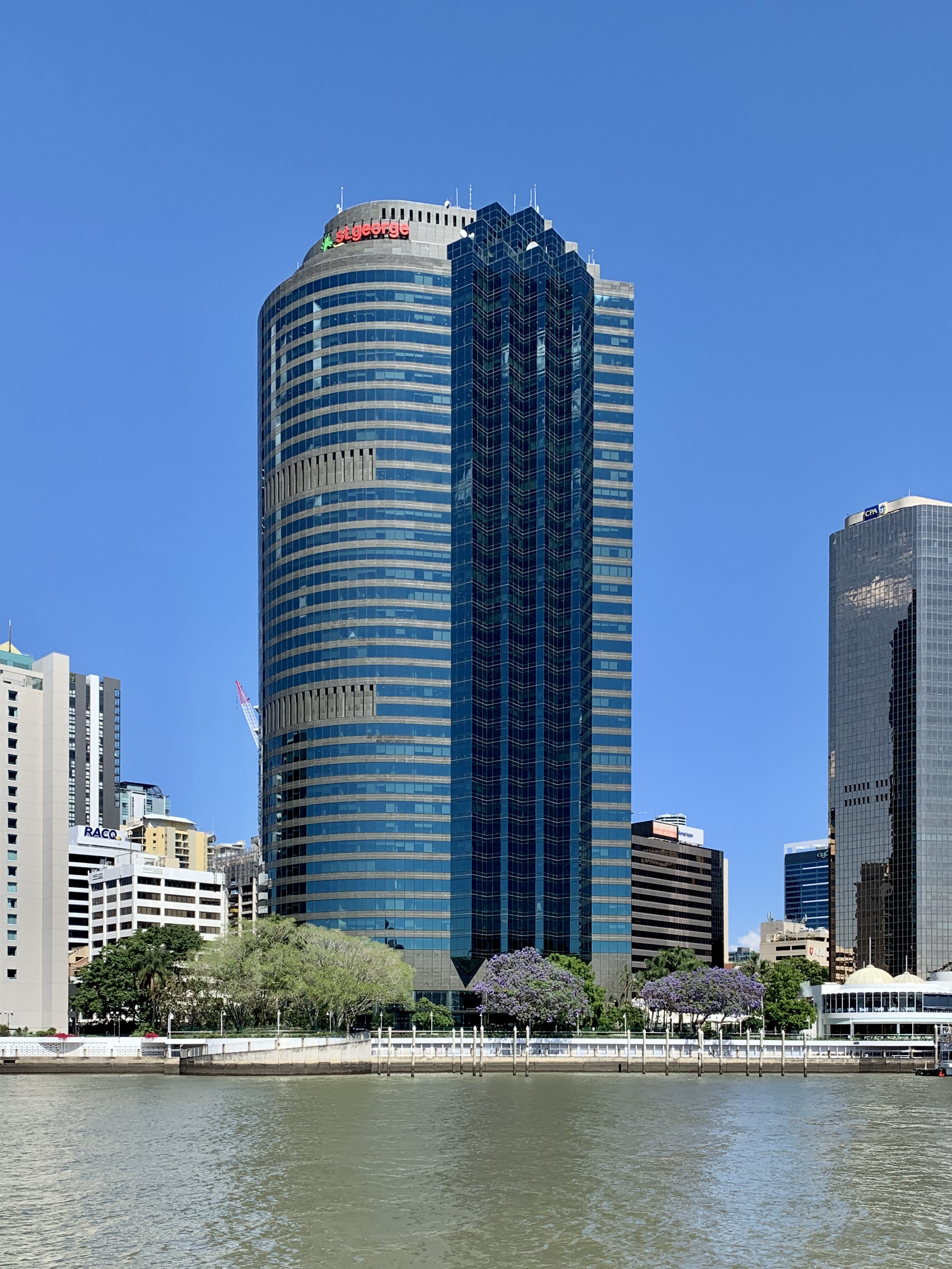

General information
- Status: Completed
- Type: office
- Location: Brisbane
- Coordinates: 27.470306°S 153.030329°E
- Completed: 1989
- Opening: 15 February 1990
- Owner: Dexus
- Operator: Dexus

Height
- Roof: 162 metres (531 ft)

Technical details
- Floor count: 40

Design and construction
- Architect: Cameron Chisholm Nicol
- Developer: F. A. Pidgeon & Son Pty Ltd
- Main contractor: F. A. Pidgeon & Son Pty Ltd

Website
- waterfrontplace.com.au

Waterfront Place is an office building in the Brisbane central business district in Queensland, Australia. It is located at 1 Eagle Street, beside the Brisbane River. It was constructed by renowned Queensland builder and developer F. A. Pidgeon and Son who led the projects development in a joint venture with Folkestone Limited. Construction was completed in 1989. The building stands 162 metres (531 ft) tall.

The Waterfront Place foyer is regularly used for art exhibitions. A grand piano is featured in the southern end of the foyer and can usually be heard playing during the morning as office workers arrive at the building. During the Christmas season, choirs and instrumentalists perform Christmas music.

== Architecture ==
Waterfront Place is one of Brisbane's landmark office towers, located on the edge of the Brisbane River in the heart of the Brisbane central business district. The building features views of the City, the Brisbane River and Story Bridge, and, from its upper floors, the islands of Moreton Bay. Waterfront Place is only a short walk from stops of ferries (Eagle Street Pier), CityCats (Riverside), buses, and the City Botanic Gardens.

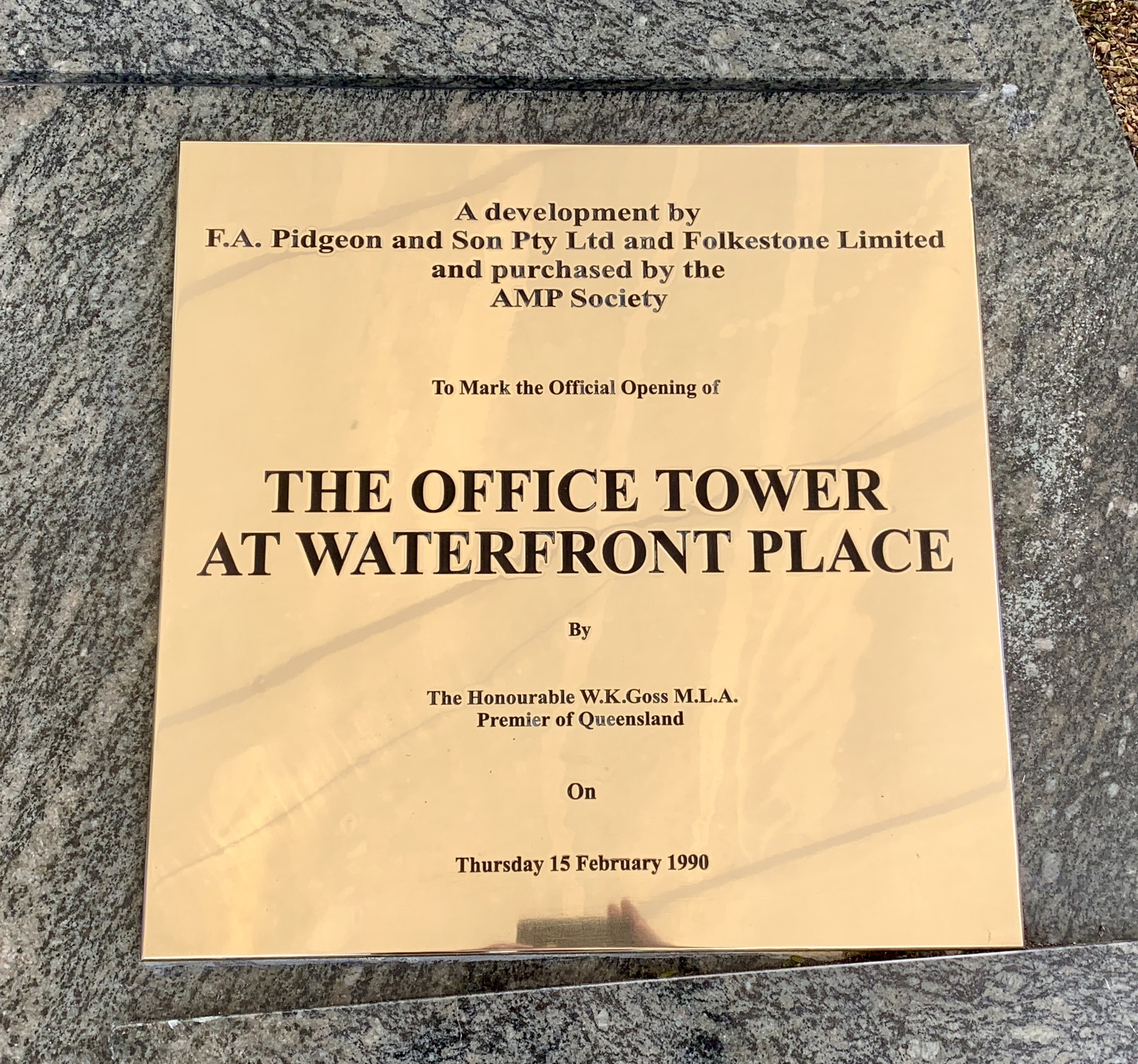
Commemorative plaque

The architects for Waterfront were Cameron Chisholm Nicol. The building was completed in December 1989, and was officially opened on 15 February 1990 by the Honourable Wayne Goss, the then Premier of Queensland.

The site now occupied by Waterfront Place was part of Brisbane's original port. In 1888 Naldham House, (part of the original Waterfront Place development, but subsequently sold in 1994), was built for the Australasian United Steam Navigation Company. By the late 1970s the site was in ownership of both the Queensland Government and the Inchcape Group of the UK. F. A. Pidgeon and Son purchased the part of the site owned by the Inchcape Group in 1982 with the intention of developing an office building in the future. The crumbling dockyard area was gradually redeveloped after 1984 into the current Eagle Street riverfront complex.

The original waterfront site covers approximately 5,200 square metres (56,000 sq ft), has two prominent street frontages and 110 metres (360 ft) frontage to the river. However, the adjoining Norman Wharf site owned by the State Government was unsightly and acted as a barrier between the site and the rest of the Brisbane central business district. To develop the site to its best potential it became necessary to purchase the Norman Wharf site from the State Government. The final site area was approximately 23,400 square metres (252,000 sq ft) including both freehold and leasehold, and enjoyed frontages on Eagle Street, Felix Street and Mary Street.

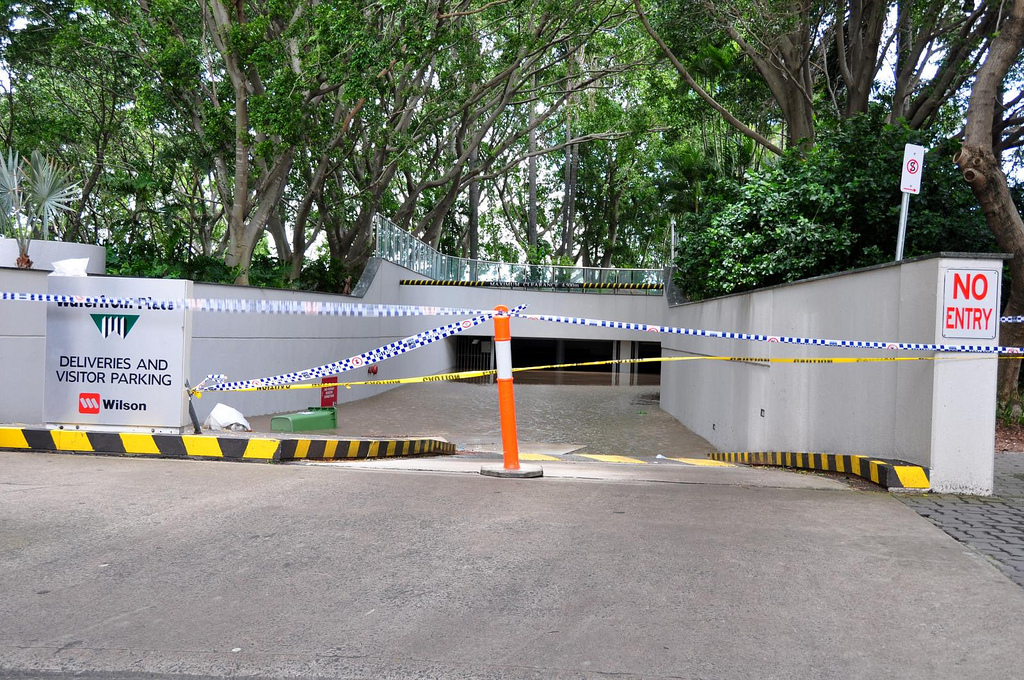
Flooded carpark during the 2010–11 Queensland floods

The building became a concern in the interest of public safety in November 2007, after a window pane fell from the building's 27th storey and landed on the road below. The pane shattered before it hit the ground, narrowly missing pedestrians and cars. The pane is one of more than 200 of which that have fallen from Waterfront Place since 1990, due to an impurity of nickel sulfide in the glass, which causes the glass to expand and shatter when it gets hot. In the mid-1990s, more than 300 windows containing the impurity were replaced in the building, however it is understood that there are still more windows with the defect. Following the 2007 incident, additional awnings were constructed across Felix Street to prevent falling window panes from landing on vehicles and pedestrians, and the marina in the Brisbane River has been dismantled.

The building's two-level carpark was completely flooded during the 2011 Brisbane flood and the whole building was inaccessible for a week.

=== Office floors ===
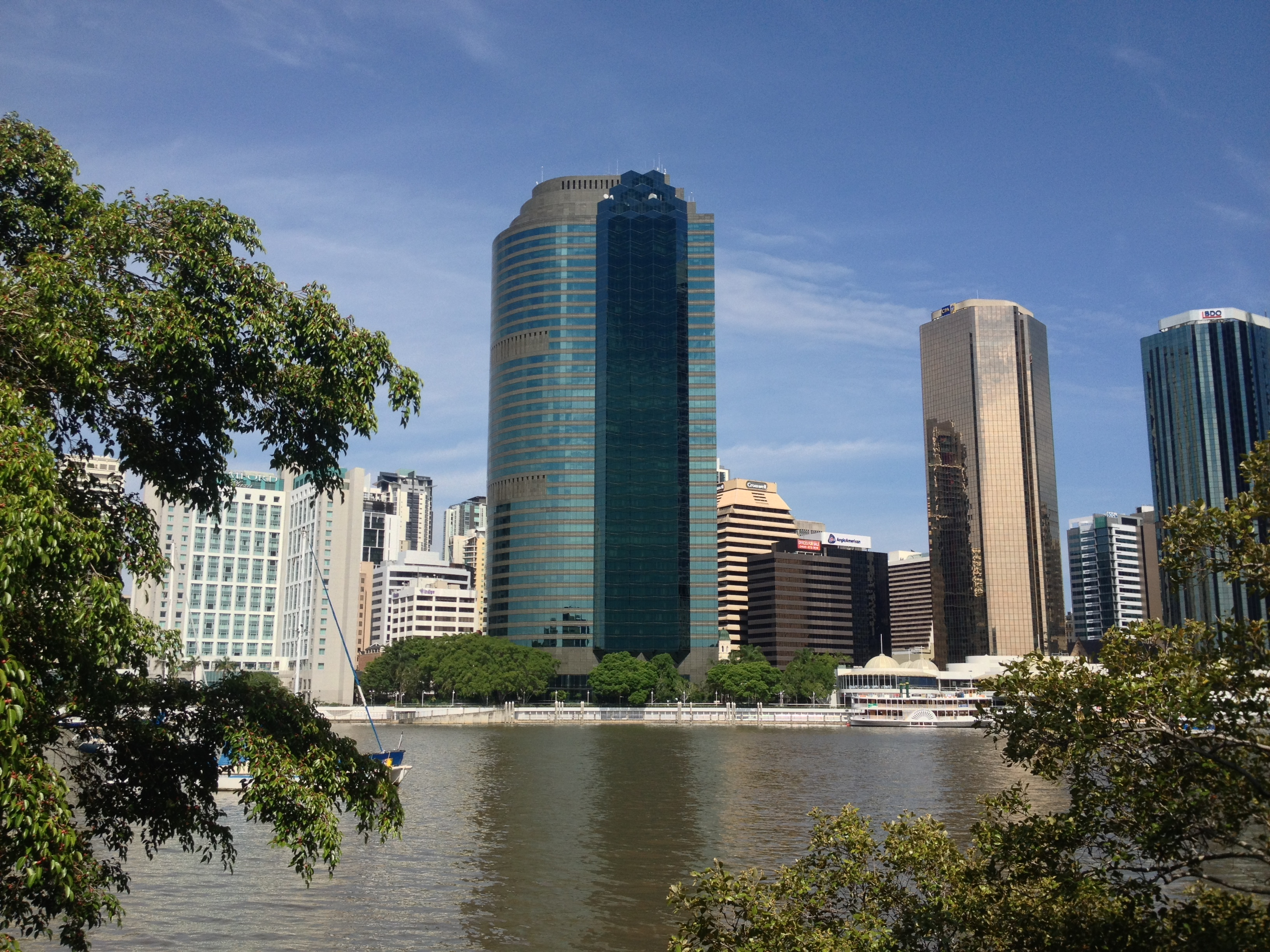
Total waterfront is 253 metres (830 ft)

Typical floor size ranges from approximately 1,816 to 1,867 square metres (19,550 to 20,100 sq ft). Floors are a column free space with a 12-metre (39 ft) window-to-core distance. There are ten corner offices per floor. Other statistics include;

- 2,700 millimetres (8.9 ft) floor to ceiling height
- 300 millimetres (12 in) window sill height
- Granite floors and marble wall tiles in the bathrooms.
- Ability to install connecting stairs for multiple floor tenants
- Separate lobby for goods delivery
- 600 by 600 millimetres (24 in × 24 in) light and ceiling grid system

The building is serviced by 22 lifts: six each for three floor sections, two goods lifts, and two lifts between the foyer and two underground car parks.

There are stand-by power facilities designed to generate 100% backup power in the event of mains power failure. Part of the equipment installed on the roof serves the communications needs of the Queensland State Emergency Service.

== Construction ==
In 1986, Folkestone Limited decided to join the project, and entered into a joint venture arrangement with F. A. Pidgeon & Son. Obayashi Corporation of Japan was invited to participate on the basis of becoming the project head contractor. The joint venture appointed Indosuez Australia to arrange finance. Cameron Chisholm Nicol were appointed to design the complex. Construction commenced in September 1987 and was completed 27 months later on Christmas Eve 1989.

During the buildings construction over 600 people worked on the site, 53,000 cubic metres (69,000 yd^{3}) of concrete was used, 9,500 panes of glass were used, 30,000 square metres (320,000 sq ft) of granite was used and 3,000 square metres (32,000 sq ft) of marble was used. In December 1989 AMP Society purchased the Waterfront Place complex from the joint venture partners.

The office tower is the dominant element of the complex. The architectural design outline of the tower is framed by matching elliptical curves with triangular projections in each of the east and west faces to create ten "corner" offices per typical floor. The elliptical shape maximises the views to the river and city.

The forty storey tower is of reinforced concrete construction and externally is clad in polished granite with double glazed solar tinted windows. The building has thirty six lettable floors with a Total Net Lettable Area of approximately 60,000 square metres (650,000 sq ft). The major features of the lobby are granite floors and walls, water features, high ceilings and polished steel columns.

== Ownership ==
In December 1989 the property was purchased from the construction venture partners by the AMP Society.

In 2003, the Ronan Property Group purchased a 20% stake from AMP.

In 2004, Stockland and Westpac purchased the property, each holding 50%. Later Westpac sold its half to the Stockland Direct Office Trust Number One.

In May 2011, the Australian Government Future Fund purchased a 50% stake in the property from the Stockland Direct Office Trust Number One.

In June 2015, the Dexus Property Group and Dexus Wholesale Property Fund purchased Waterfront Place and Eagle Street Pier retail complex for $635M from Stockland and the Future Fund.

== Tenants ==
The building's tenants include many major Australian and international firms. Among the tenants are the 21st Governor-General of Australia, Bill Hayden, Senator Ron Boswell, and the Commonwealth Parliament of Australia. The first federal cabinet meeting of the Rudd Government was held in the building on 6 December 2007.

== See also ==
- List of tallest buildings in Brisbane
