= Teys Australia =

Meat processing company in Australia

Coordinates: 27.7138°S 153.1791°E

- Industry: meat-processing
- Founded: 1946; 80 years ago
- Headquarters: Eight Mile Plains, Queensland, Australia
- Website: teysgroup.com/au/

Teys Australia is a meat-processing company headquartered at Building 3, Freeway Office Park, 2728 Logan Road, Eight Mile Plains, in Brisbane, Queensland, Australia. In 2014, it was Australia's second-largest meat processor and exporter, with export operations in 40 countries.

== History ==
In 1946, the four Teys brothers, Cid, Cliff, Mick, and Max, purchased a series of butcher shops in and around Brisbane. By 1952, the business grew to eight shops, a wholesale operation, and a newly completed abattoir at Beenleigh.

Teys has a history of working in various partnerships over the decades, including with Canada Packers Inc, Consolidated Press Holdings, and since 2011, Cargill. Through a partnership with Teys, reversing the significant losses of the Lakes Creek Abattoir then controlled by Kerry Packer became possible.

Teys has built long-lasting international supply relationships, particularly in Japan, to which it was one of the first exporters of chilled beef.

== Operations ==
As at 2025, Teys Australia Pty Ltd is 100% owned by the Cargill Company. It is Australia's second-largest meat processor and exporter, with export operations in 40 countries. Teys operates six beef-processing plants, as well as owning three feedlots, cattle hide-processing operations, and other beef-related businesses.

Teys process 32,000 cattle weekly, which generate a turnover of around AU$2.5 billion annually. Teys continues to develop its international business in response to growing Asian demand. Teys USA is a subsidiary company based in Chicago.

Teys operate across a number of sites in Australia:

- Meat-processing facilities in Rockhampton (Lakes Creek), Biloela, and Beenleigh in Queensland, Tamworth and Wagga Wagga in New South Wales, and Naracoorte in South Australia
- Feedlots in Condamine in Queensland, Springdale in New South Wales, and Charlton in Victoria
- Hide processing in Murgon in Queensland
- Manufacturing delicatessen food and convenience meals at Hemmant in Queensland
- Manufacturing consumer-ready fresh meat in Wagga Wagga

== Awards ==
The company has a record of hiring and up-skilling migrant and refugee workers. In 2013, the company received an Enterprise Award from the Queensland government as part of its annual Multicultural Awards.

In 2014, the company was inducted into the Queensland Business Leaders Hall of Fame.
