= Valmai Pidgeon =

People from Queensland (born 1927)

Florence Valmai Miller Pidgeon AM (born c. 1927 - 5 June 2026) was a leading figure in the Arts and the construction industry in Queensland, Australia.

After completing her education in 1945, Florence joined her father's building construction business F.A. Pidgeon & Son Pty Ltd. which was founded in 1927. She was appointed Company Secretary in 1950 of the company, and a Director in 1957, Joint Managing Director with her brother, John Pidgeon, in 1980, and managing director in 1993. Under the joint stewardship, F.A. Pidgeon & Son Pty Ltd., grew into one of the largest privately owned construction companies in Queensland. Valmai Pidgeon has also established herself as a developer in her own right, through a range of projects in and around Brisbane - most recently, a major inner city high-rise residential development.

Of particular note has been her public profile as a supporter of landscape architecture through her own award-winning garden in her Holland Park home. She also supports many important groups including Opera Queensland, Opera Australia, Australian Ballet, Queensland Art Gallery, Royal Brisbane Hospital, St. John's Cathedral, QUT's Art Museum, Multiple Sclerosis and the State Library of Queensland.

Valmai Pidgeon is a Les Étoiles supporter of the Australian Ballet, which is a gathering of individuals who are amongst the most dedicated friends of the Australian Ballet.

== Honours and awards ==
On 11 June 2001 Valmai was recognised with an AM for service to the arts in Queensland as a patron and benefactor, to women, particularly in the area of industrial democracy in the workplace, and to the community.

School and university buildings have been named in her honour including the Valmai Pidgeon Performing Arts Centre at Somerville House school, which was opened in her honour in the year 2000.

A special ceremony in 2005 hosted by the Queensland University of Technology Chancellor, Major General Peter Arnison AC, CVO and Vice-Chancellor, Professor Peter Coaldrake, was held at Old Government House was held in honour of Valmai as she was conferred with the degree of Doctor of the university. "Miss Pidgeon was recognised for her outstanding contribution to the community and QUT through distinguished service to the construction industry, the arts, and the advancement of women. Miss Pidgeon has made a significant contribution to QUT over the past 20 years as a patron of the QUT Art Museum and Art Collection, and as a generous benefactor and vocal supporter."

Valmai Pidgeon was inducted into the Queensland Business Leaders Hall of Fame in 2009.
