= Sunny Queen =

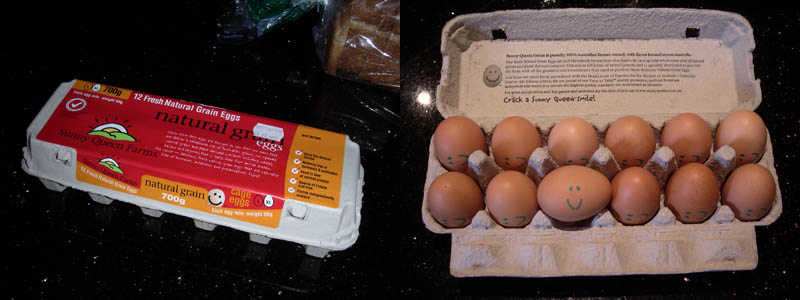
Carton of decorated Sunny Queen eggs, 2006

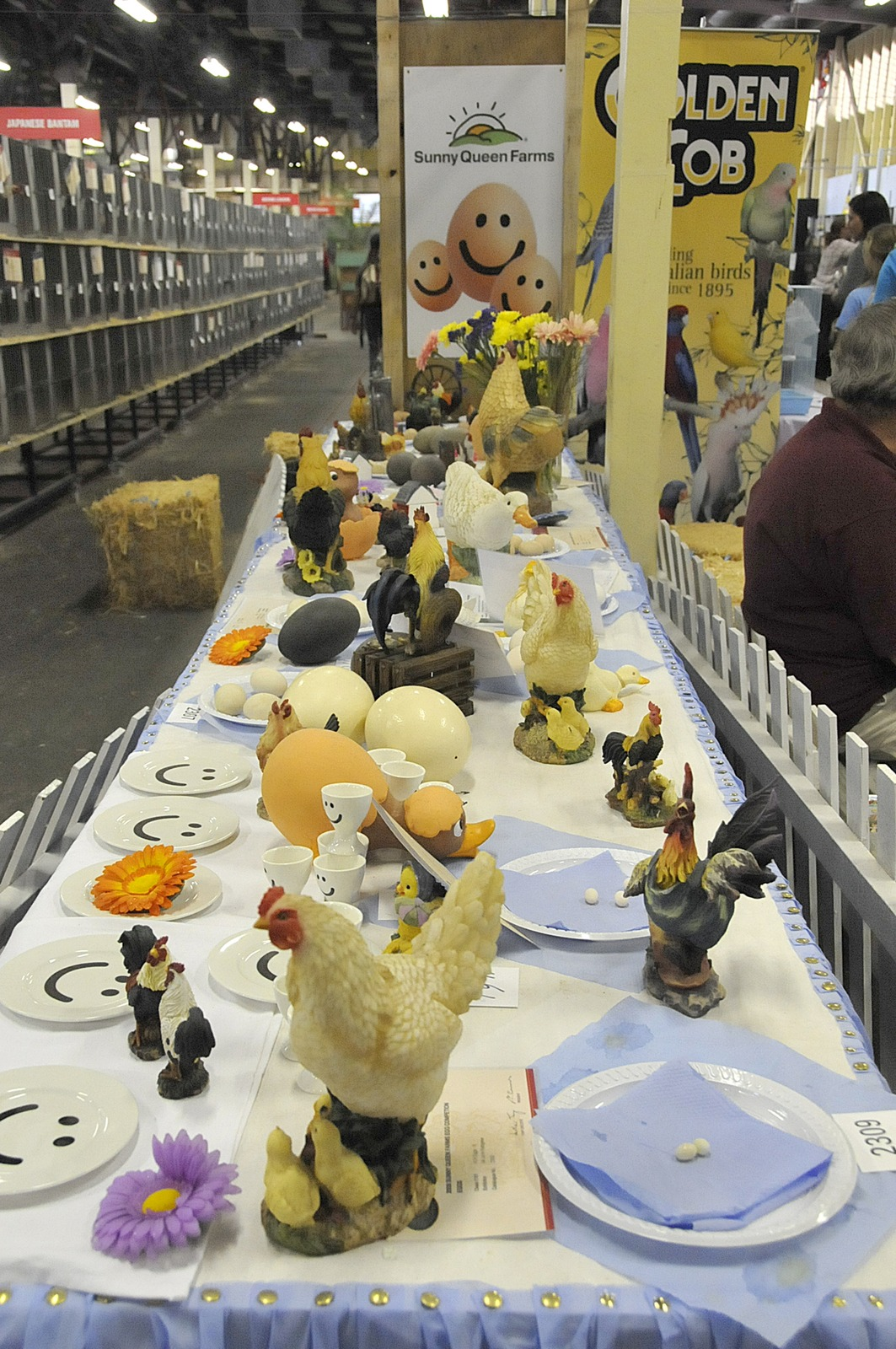
Sunny Queen egg display in the poultry pavilion at the Ekka 2009

Sunny Queen Pty Ltd is Australia’s largest egg farming company. In 2025, it was inducted into the Queensland Business Leaders Hall of Fame for its sustained excellence and reputation as the leading Australian producer, marketer and distributor of egg products for over 50 years.

== History ==
Sunny Queen Australia began life as the Queensland Egg Board in 1930, initially focused on the marketing and distribution of eggs, before the business eventually became privatised by the Hall and McLean families. Simon Hall, a second-generation egg farmer and director of Sunny Queen whose family helped lay the foundations for what Sunny Queen is today, said it was through hard work and investment that they were able to grow the business.

== Production ==
As at 2025, Australians consume an average of 266 eggs per person per year of which Sunny Queen supplies more than 1.5 billion. It is the leading supplier of eggs in Australia. To meet that demand, Sunny Queen has expanded from selling cartons of eggs, to developing and selling more than 60 products across three product ranges: shell eggs, liquid eggs, and ready-to-go egg meals.

== Strategy ==
Innovation has always been a key factor in the growth of the business, with Sunny Queen investing heavily in cage-free and free-range egg production facilities and transparent practices. In 2009, the company launched Sunny Queen Cage Free eggs which quickly became a market leader. It has since also become a leader in free-range eggs and organic eggs as Australian demand for these eggs continues to grow. Sunny Queen’s biggest-selling eggs now come from hens with access to pasture, and its online "Chook Tracker" lets consumers watch hens roam live.

The business has had to deal with droughts, fires, floods and the threat of bird flu and believes it is critical to maintain public trust in such situations.
