= Queen Fine Foods =

Australian food manufacturer

Queen Fine Foods is Australia's leading producer of pure vanilla extracts, food colourings, and baking aids. Queen Vanilla was named after and endorsed by Queen Victoria. Queen is the top-selling brand of fine foods in Australian supermarkets, and is Queensland's longest-selling food brand.

== History ==
In 1897 Brisbane pharmacist Edward Taylor created a range of extracts, including vanilla. He and partner Mr. Colledge formed the Queen brand, and began to win awards for their flavourings.

By the 1920s, the Queen Vanilla range was sold in hand made glass bottles.

The company was purchased by the Himstedt family in 1978.

Queen's manufacturing facility was established in Alderley, Brisbane during the 1980s.

Between 2000 and 2010 the company established strong ties with vanilla farmers, and provided education, training and funding in vanilla producing countries, in particular Papua New Guinea. By 2014, Queen was also providing funding, equipment and education to Vanilla farmers in Vava'u, Tonga and Madagascar.

In 2015 Queen Fine Foods was acquired by German brand Dr. Oetker.

Fred Himstedt is the Managing Director, with his sons Fred, Sam, and Tom holding key positions.

== Awards ==
Most Innovative Food Ingredient 2005

In 2017, Queen Fine Foods was inducted into the Queensland Business Leaders Hall of Fame.
