= Queensland Business Leaders Hall of Fame =

The Queensland Business Leaders Hall of Fame recognises a set of the leaders in business and social development in Queensland, Australia. Inclusion in the hall of fame can be of individual people (living or dead), groups of people, and organisations, which operate either for profit and not for profit.

== History ==
In 2009, the State Library of Queensland, the Queensland Library Foundation and Queensland University of Technology collaborated to establish the Queensland Business Leaders Hall of Fame (QBLHoF) which recognises the "outstanding public contribution made by leaders of business to the reputation of Queensland and its economic and social development".

The new inductees are announced at an annual Induction Dinner gala event each year.

== Criteria ==
The criteria have been established for the Induction Committee to assess the eligibility of those who will be proposed as inductees of the Queensland Business Leaders Hall of Fame. Nominees may be drawn from the for-profit and not-for-profit sectors:

Required Criteria

- Outstanding leadership
- Ethical and moral conduct

Desirable criteria may include:

- Major financial contribution
- Social and inclusive leadership
- Global impact and influence

== List of Inductees ==
The inductees are:

Year	Inductee	In recognition of
2026	Bevan Slattery	In recognition of entrepreneurial leadership in building Australia’s digital infrastructure and founding globally influential technology enterprises, positioning Queensland as a hub for global connectivity.
2026	Endeavour Foundation	In recognition of 75 years of leadership supporting Australians who live with a disability through education, employment, housing and community inclusion.
2026	Ludo Studio	In recognition of visionary entrepreneurship and outstanding contributions to the international film, television, animation and digital entertainment industries.
2026	Sarina Russo AM	In recognition of transformative leadership in vocational education and training, business innovation and service to communities across Australia for nearly 50 years.
2026	Stuart Giles and Cathie Reid AM	In recognition of pioneering leadership in healthcare innovation and philanthropy, that has strengthened Queensland’s health services and enriched Australian communities.
2026	TechnologyOne	In recognition of pioneering Australian software innovation and sustained industry leadership that have transformed digital services for organisations across Australia.
2025	Betty Byrne Henderson	her groundbreaking contribution as a businesswoman to the automotive industry and for significant contributions to philanthropy and the community.
2025	Keri Craig-Lee	distinguished, pioneering contributions to the Australian fashion industry and sustained business leadership excellence
2025	Buderim Ginger	its standing as Australia's leading producer, processor and distributor of world class ginger products and for its distinguished reputation for its products globally.
2025	Harvey Lister	outstanding and sustained leadership contributions to the events and entertainment industries, stadium development and stadium management both nationally and internationally.
2025	Euan Murdoch	visionary entrepreneurship and innovation, making nationally significant contributions to Australia's pharmaceutical and biotechnology industries.
2025	Sunny Queen	its sustained excellence and reputation as the leading Australian producer, marketer and distributor of egg products for over 50 years.
2024	Longhurst family	over 50 years of visionary and sustained entrepreneurship across the tourism, property and boating industries nationally.
2024	Shelley Reys	groundbreaking contributions to the Indigenous space and reconciliation and as an influential business leader and change maker.
2024	Stefan Ackerie	sustained entrepreneurship in developing an iconic Queensland business for 60 years.
2024	Data3	continuing excellence and outstanding innovation in the provision of technology solutions and services throughout Australia.
2024	Piñata Farms	outstanding leadership and innovation in Australia's food production industry for over 60 years.
2023	Terri Irwin	outstanding business leadership and for internationally recognised contributions to wildlife and habitat conservation and to Australian tourism.
2023	Arthur Petfield	outstanding contributions to Queensland's business and industrial development, Australia's international communications’ infrastructure and for significant community service.
2023	Lorraine Martin	groundbreaking, visionary contributions of national significance to private education businesses, and for enduring and significant community services.
2023	Bundaberg Brewed Drinks	of sustained success in international export markets and for significant contributions to Queensland manufacturing, agribusiness and the economy of the Bundaberg region.
2023	Morgans Financial	substantial contributions to the national and international financial services sector and its significant contributions to the community.
2023	Sullivan Nicolaides Pathology	sustained excellence and innovation in the delivery of pathology services to Queensland and beyond.
2022	Clive Berghofer	groundbreaking contributions to the Toowoomba region through pioneering property development and construction, civic leadership, and nationally significant and diverse philanthropy.
2022	Dr Cherrell Hirst	outstanding leadership contributions to health services, education, biotechnology and business as a trailblazing leader.
2022	Peter & Jane Hughes	sustained excellence and innovation in the Australian cattle industry and becoming a world leader in Wagyu beef production.
2022	Capilano Honey	remarkable service to Australia's honey production industry, its iconic status as Australia's leading honey brand and continuing major success in global markets.
2022	Culture Kings	building a Queensland start-up business into a unique global retail brand through unstinting creative entrepreneurship.
2022	QML Pathology	its pioneering contributions to Queensland and its communities through world class pathology service delivery over 90 years.
2021	Finlayson's Timber & Hardware	their outstanding contribution to Queensland's timber industry and internationally recognised timber products.
2021	Australian Country Choice	visionary leadership in establishing the largest privately owned vertically integrated beef and cattle business in the world.
2021	Katie Page	sustained contributions to national and international business expansion, leadership excellence and distinguished service to the community.
2021	John Beals Chandler	significant contributions to retail and radio broadcasting networks in Queensland and exceptional community service.
2021	Thomas Beirne	pioneering forward-thinking leadership and significant achievements in retailing, community service and philanthropy.
2021	The Coffee Club	its successful development from Australia's leading coffee retail business into a major, thriving international brand through sustained entrepreneurship.
2019	Philip Bacon	his status as Australia's leading art dealer and outstanding contributions to philanthropy.
2019	George Fisher	his eminent business leadership, driving the long-term success of Mount Isa Mines and Mount Isa's growth and development as a city.
2019	Birch Carroll & Coyle	being Australia's leading provincial film distributor and its industry leadership throughout Queensland for 80 years.
2019	Evans Deakin & Company	its major contributions to the Queensland economy for nearly a century through excellence in heavy engineering, construction and ship building.
2019	Springfield City Group - Maha Sinnathamby and Bob Sharpless	their visionary entrepreneurship in establishing Springfield, a nation-building project and Australia's first privately constructed city.
2019	Wallace Bishop	its sustained leadership in jewellery making and retailing for over 100 years.
2018	George Marchant	his significant national business success, internationally recognised innovation and for creating an enduring legacy for Queensland through outstanding philanthropy.
2018	George Miller	his unparalleled contributions to producing and directing commercially successful internationally award-winning films and for his outstanding contributions to the Australian and international film industries.
2018	John Moffat	his pioneering entrepreneurship in establishing North Queensland's mining industry and for his extensive business and community developments in the Cairns hinterland.
2018	Thérèse Rein	outstanding international business achievements as a ground-breaking social entrepreneur leading to unprecedented employment outcomes for people with disabilities.
2018	Domino's	its remarkable national and international success in the food industry resulting in pizza market leadership in seven countries through Don Meij's outstanding leadership and disruptive innovation.
2018	Wagners	their intrepid entrepreneurship in successfully completing highly challenging infrastructure projects nationally and internationally.
2017	Walkers Limited	its 150 years of outstanding contributions to Queensland and Australian heavy engineering manufacturing, and for its sustained service to the community of Maryborough.
2017	Queen Fine Foods	its national market leadership and status as an iconic Australian brand for 120 years.
2017	Blackmores	its international success as a major Australian exporter and as Australia's leading vitamins and supplements manufacturer.
2017	Halfbrick Studios	its international leadership in mobile video games development, including the highly successful game Fruit Ninja, and for its outstanding contribution to the global games industry.
2017	Dimity Dornan	her pioneering work in building Hear and Say into an international leader in the treatment of hearing loss in children.
2017	George Chapman	his visionary contribution to tourism and the economy of Cairns and Far North Queensland, for the development of Skyrail Rainforest Cableway, and for distinguished service to Australian business and the community.
2016	Suncorp	its important and sustained contribution to the Queensland economy through the provision of insurance, banking and financial services for 100 years.
2016	Mincom	its pioneering contribution to Queensland's information technology industry and for becoming a global technology leader through world class innovation.
2016	North Australian Pastoral Company	its sustained and significant contribution to the Queensland economy for 140 years as an innovative cattle breeder, beef producer and leader in land care practices.
2016	Margaret Mittelheuser	her groundbreaking achievements as Australia's first female stockbroker and for her significant contributions to women in business and philanthropy.
2016	Rodney Wylie	his outstanding contribution to the Queensland economy through leadership of Queensland and Australian corporations and for significant contributions to the public accounting profession and the community.
2016	Manuel Hornibrook	his distinguished contributions to Australia's construction industry, national infrastructure, iconic bridges, the Sydney Opera House and for becoming the nation's leading builder.
2015	The Courier-Mail	its distinguished contribution to reporting Queensland affairs for close to 170 years and its recognised status as Queensland's leading newspaper.
2015	Lawrence Wackett	his visionary and tenacious leadership and innovation in establishing Australia's aircraft design and manufacturing industries and their contribution to the defence of Australia.
2015	Hyne Timber	the Hyne family's significant contribution to the timber industry, regional employment and the innovative production of timber products for over 130 years.
2015	Ellen O'Brien and Defiance Flour	her pioneering leadership in establishing Defiance Flour Mills and its signature product Defiance Flour, a leading Australian brand for over 100 years.
2015	Blue Care	its national leadership and outstanding contribution to developing world class services in aged care throughout the communities of Queensland for over sixty years.
2015	Benjamin Wickham MacDonald	his excellence in leadership in the Australian shipping industry, leading to his recognition as the Napoleon of Australian shipping.
2014	Sarah Ann Jenyns	her audacious leadership, entrepreneurship and innovation in designing and manufacturing health and fashion garments, gaining worldwide recognition and national industry leadership.
2014	Bank of Queensland	its excellence in providing banking services to Queensland for over a century and its continuing expansion nationally.
2014	RACQ	its iconic contribution to motoring services, public advocacy for motorists, road safety and community service throughout Queensland for over 100 years.
2014	John Williams	his pioneering contribution to the development of the Queensland economy as the first holder of a trading licence, first public transport operator, coal miner and store keeper.
2014	Vincent Fairfax	his outstanding contributions to leadership in Australian business and community organisations and for his visionary, enduring philanthropy.
2014	Teys Australia	their highly successful and resilient leadership and innovation in beef processing and exporting for over sixty years.
2013	Charles Chauvel	his pioneering contributions to the Australian film industry, his entrepreneurship and his iconic status as a Queensland and Australian filmmaker.
2013	Paula Stafford	her fashion industry innovation, establishing her brand name nationally and internationally and significantly enhancing the reputation of the Gold Coast.
2013	Brett Family	highly diverse major contributions and industry leadership within Queensland business for over 100 years, especially in the timber and hardware industries.
2013	QUF	its success as a listed Queensland public company and its outstanding contribution to the national dairy industry through innovations in production technology, products and marketing.
2013	Mackay Sugar	its sustained excellence in sugar production and its substantial contribution to the Mackay region and to the Queensland economy.
2013	Queensland Country Women's Association	its exceptional contribution to the social and economic wellbeing of country women and rural communities for over 90 years.
2012	Eva Burrows	her far-reaching contributions to the community through exceptional global and national leadership of the Salvation Army.
2012	William Knox D'Arcy	his major contribution to the success of the Mount Morgan gold mine and the international significance of his role in the discovery of oil in Persia.
2012	Cyril Golding	his major contributions to civil infrastructure and mining services in Queensland as well as to philanthropy and the community.
2012	McDonald family	their continuing leadership and innovation in beef cattle production for more than 150 years in Queensland as well as substantial contributions to the community.
2012	ALS Limited (formerly Campbell Brothers)	its distinguished global business achievements and sustained contributions to Queensland's economy for nearly 150 years in testing, inspection, and certification services.
2012	Royal National Agricultural and Industrial Association of Queensland	the Royal Queensland Show's iconic standing and its outstanding contribution to Queensland industry and society for 136 years.
2011	John Nosworthy	outstanding economic and social contributions to Queensland through leadership excellence in business, professional life and community service
2011	Rhonda White, wife of Terry White	her exceptional entrepreneurship and innovation in national retailing and significant contributions to the community
2011	Terry White	his exceptional entrepreneurship and innovation in national retailing and significant contributions to public leadership and the community
2011	AP Eagers	its sustained success and excellence in motor vehicle retailing and service to the community for 100 years
2011	Queensland National Bank	its critical contribution to Queenslands early economic development by providing vital banking services throughout the State
2011	Royal Flying Doctor Service	its iconic contribution to rural health and rural community building in Australia through exceptional standards of service and innovation
2011	Thiess	its outstanding contribution to infrastructure development in Australia and for its pioneering of international trade
2010	Jack Hutchinson	his major and sustained contribution to Queensland's construction industry and economy
2010	Kate Mary Smith	her historically significant business leadership, developing a Queensland funeral business now in its sixth generation
2010	Graham Turner	his creation of Flight Centre, Australia's leading domestic and international travel sales business, through outstanding entrepreneurship and innovation
2010	James Tyson	his outstanding rural entrepreneurship, significantly contributing to Queensland's development
2010	Bundaberg Distilling Company	its development of an iconic national and international product, Bundaberg Rum and contributing significantly to Queensland's rural industry
2010	Golden Circle	its significant contribution to processing Queensland produce and developing high quality national product brands
2010	Queensland Institute of Medical Research	its distinguished contribution to community wellbeing through world class medical research and its commercialisation
2010	Ray White Group	its building of Australia's leading real estate business, contributing significantly to national and international property sales and development
2010	Mount Isa Mines	its sustained and outstanding contribution to Queenslands economy, the mining industry and rural development
2009	Don Argus	his outstanding business leadership significantly contributing to national and international business
2009	Bob Bryan	his outstanding entrepreneurship in the mining industry significantly contributing to Queensland's economic development
2009	Steve Irwin	his outstanding international entrepreneurship, both in business and wildlife conservation, significantly contributing to Queensland and its international reputation
2009	Clem Jones	his outstanding business and community leadership significantly contributing to Queensland's development
2009	Jim Kennedy	his outstanding national business leadership and significantly contributing to Queensland business and the community
2009	John Pidgeon	his outstanding business leadership significantly contributing to Queensland business and the community
2009	Valmai Pidgeon	her outstanding business leadership significantly contributing to Queensland business and the community
2009	Joe Saragossi	his outstanding and sustained business leadership significantly contributing to the Queensland economy
2009	Angela Mary Doyle	her outstanding organisational leadership significantly contributing to Queensland and its health and social wellbeing
2009	Burns Philp	its significant contributions made to the development of Queensland and its economy
2009	Castlemaine Perkins	an iconic Queensland brewing business significantly contributing to the Queensland economy and community
2009	Qantas	iconic national and international airline business, originating in Queensland, and significantly contributing to the Queensland economy and community

== Fellowship ==
Since 2014 the QBLHOF has also awarded an annual Fellowship, to recipients working on a research project that utilises the resources of the John Oxley Library at State Library of Queensland to produce new interpretations of Queensland's business history.

=== List of Fellowship winners ===
Year	Fellow	Project
2025	Dr Joanne Dolley	Businesswomen of Queensland: The histories and successes of Queensland Businesswomen pre-1970
2024	Dr Robin Trotter	T C Dixon & Sons: Boots: Makers of 'Shoes of Distinction'
2022	Mary Howells	Trittons: Furnishing Queensland
2021	Dr Robin Trotter	Sir Arthur Petfield: From tinplate to porcelain
2019	Rutian Mi	The history of Chinese business in Queensland
2018	Hilary Davies	Putting Queenslanders on the Road: Canada Cycle and Motor Agency
2017	Toni Massey	Diving into the history of Queensland's pearl-shelling industry
2016	Dr Toni Risson	Greek cafes in Brisbane
2015	Julie Hornibrook	Manuel Hornibrook: Father of the Australian Building Industry
2014	Madeleine King and Dr Nadia Buick	High Street Histories: Queensland's fashion business leaders
