= Wallace Bishop (company) =

- Type: Private Company
- Industry: Retail
- Founded: 1917, Australia
- Headquarters: Australia
- Area served: Sydney; Brisbane; Melbourne; Perth
- Products: Jewellery, timepieces and decorative arts
- Website: Official website

Wallace Bishop is a specialty retailer of jewellery, timepieces and decorative arts in Australia.

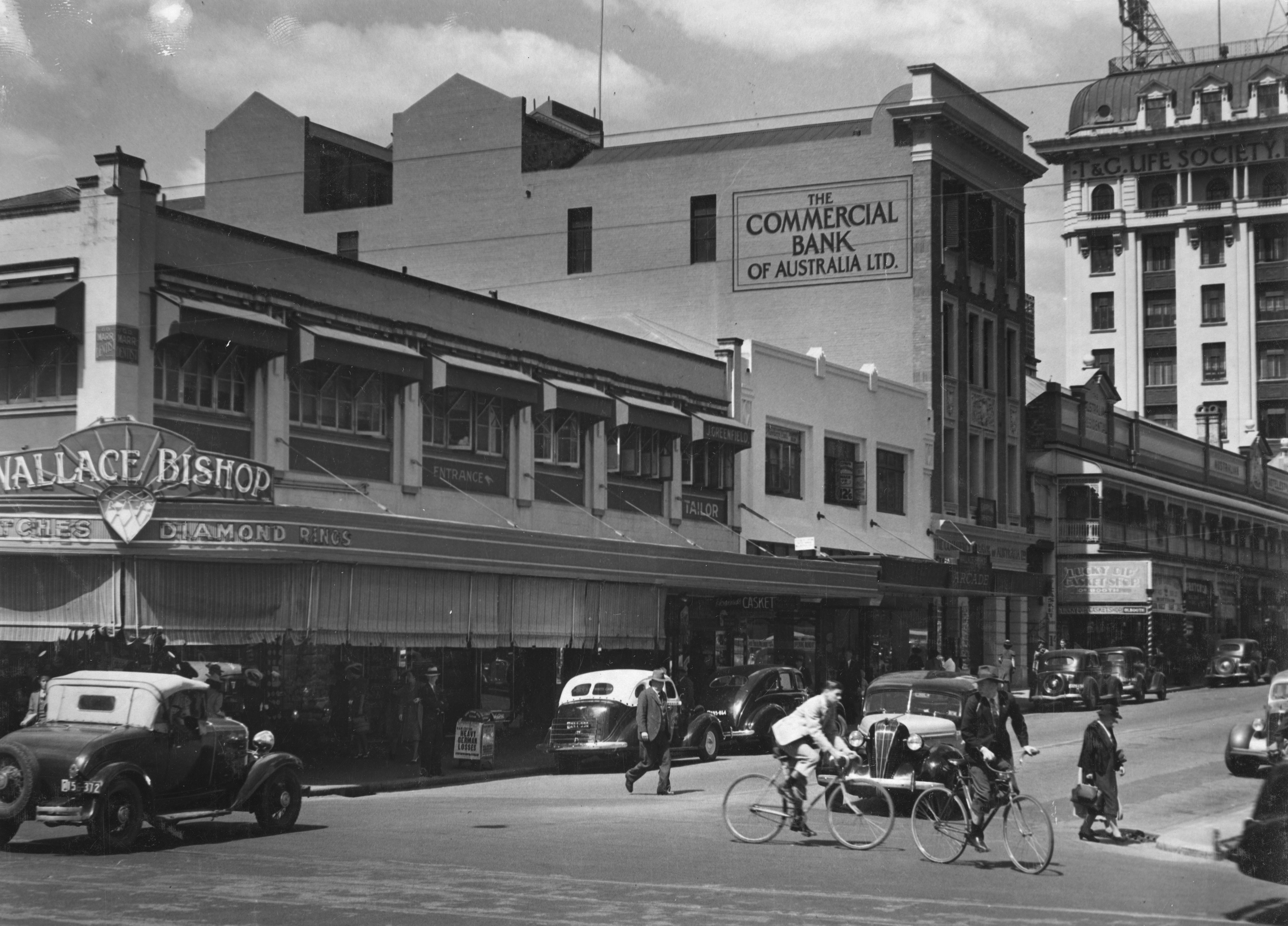
Wallace Bishop jewellery store on the corner of Albert and Queen Streets, Brisbane, 1939

The jeweller Wallace Bishop arrived in Queensland, Australia in 1909 having experience of jewellery and goldsmithing in England in the late 19th century. He was initially employed by jewellers in Queen Street in Brisbane, Queensland. Bishop established his own manufacturing business in 1917.

In 1934, Wallace Bishop's son, Carl Bishop, designed the Wallace Bishop Loyal watch which continues to be marketed today and which gave rise to an advertising slogan – “The time by Wallace Bishop watch is …”

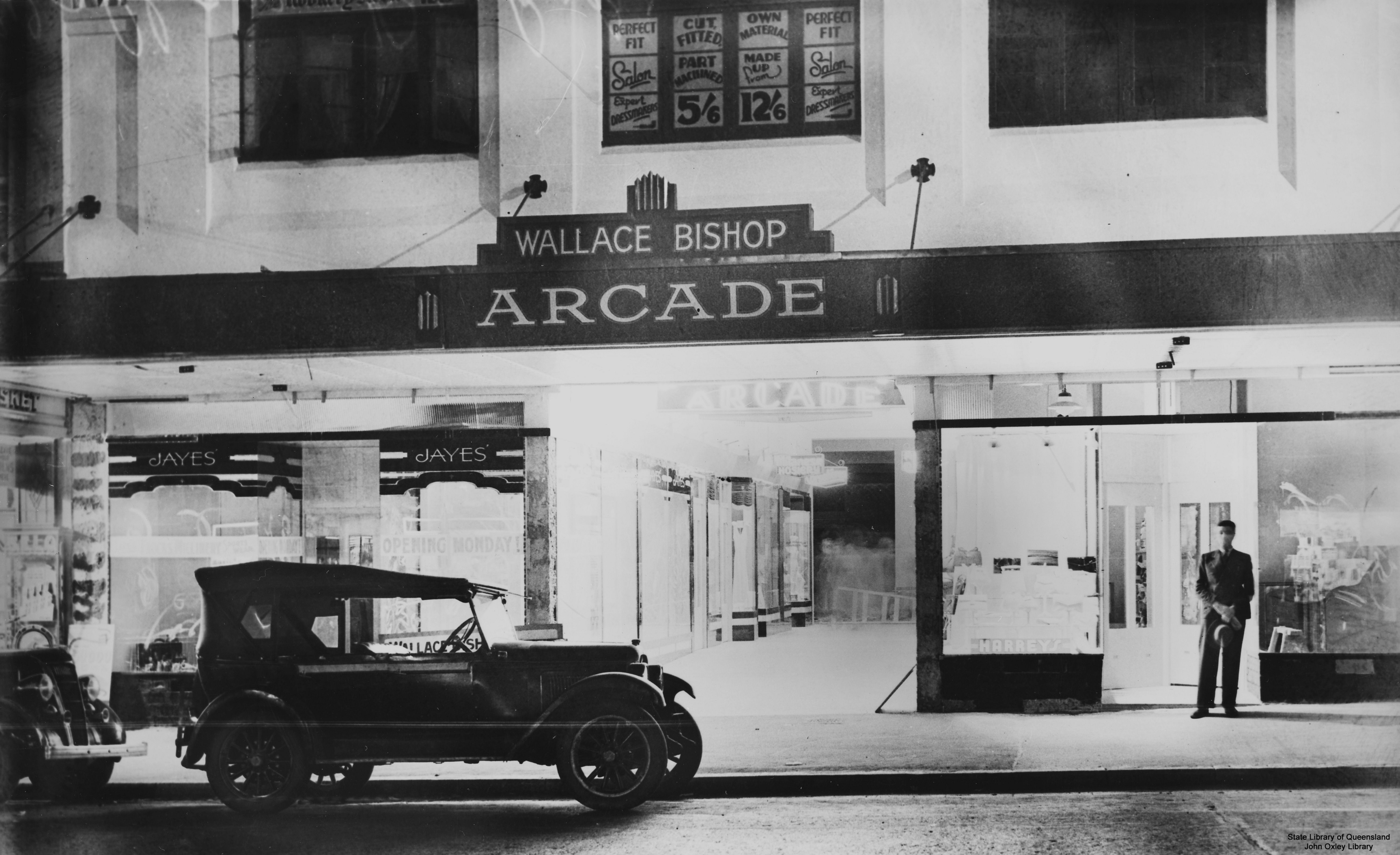
Wallace Bishop Arcade, Albert Street, 1939

Opening of its Wallace Bishop Arcade in King George Square coincided with the day World War II commenced in 1939, becoming a landmark business location in the city for 75 years. Wallace Bishop junior, known as Wal, joined the business in 1950, straight from school, later becoming chief executive officer in 1976. He drove strong growth in the business coinciding with the construction of major shopping malls across Queensland. Upon becoming chairman in 2010, Wal’s son Stuart became CEO, a position he presently occupies while younger family from the 5th generation are employed in the business in preparation for their roles as future leaders.

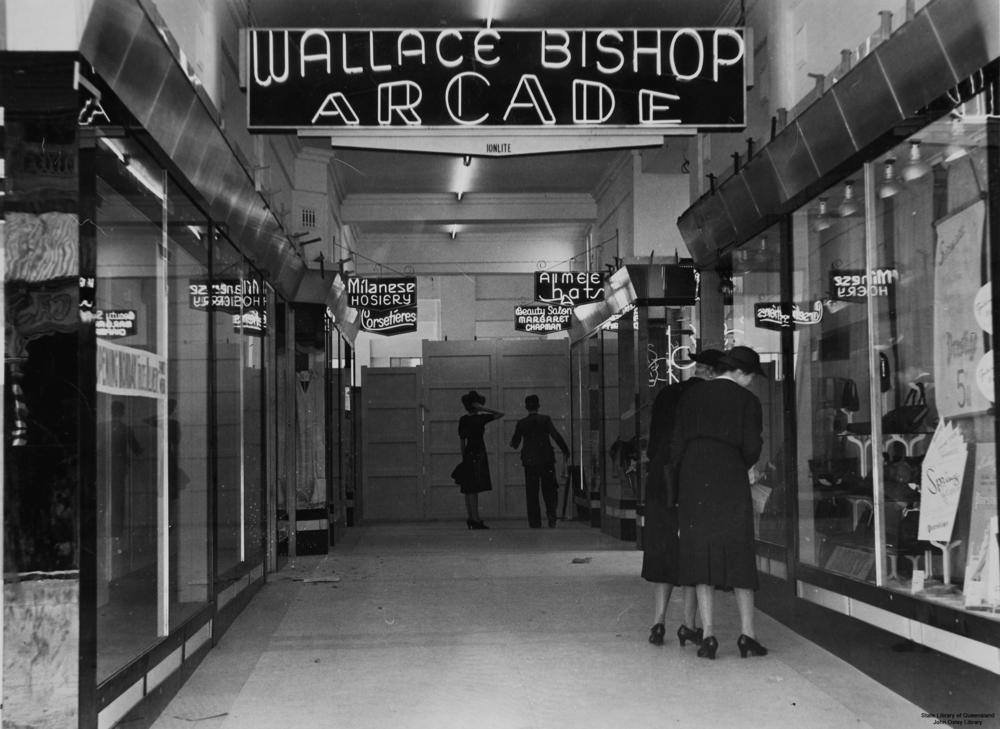
Inside Wallace Bishop Arcade, 1939

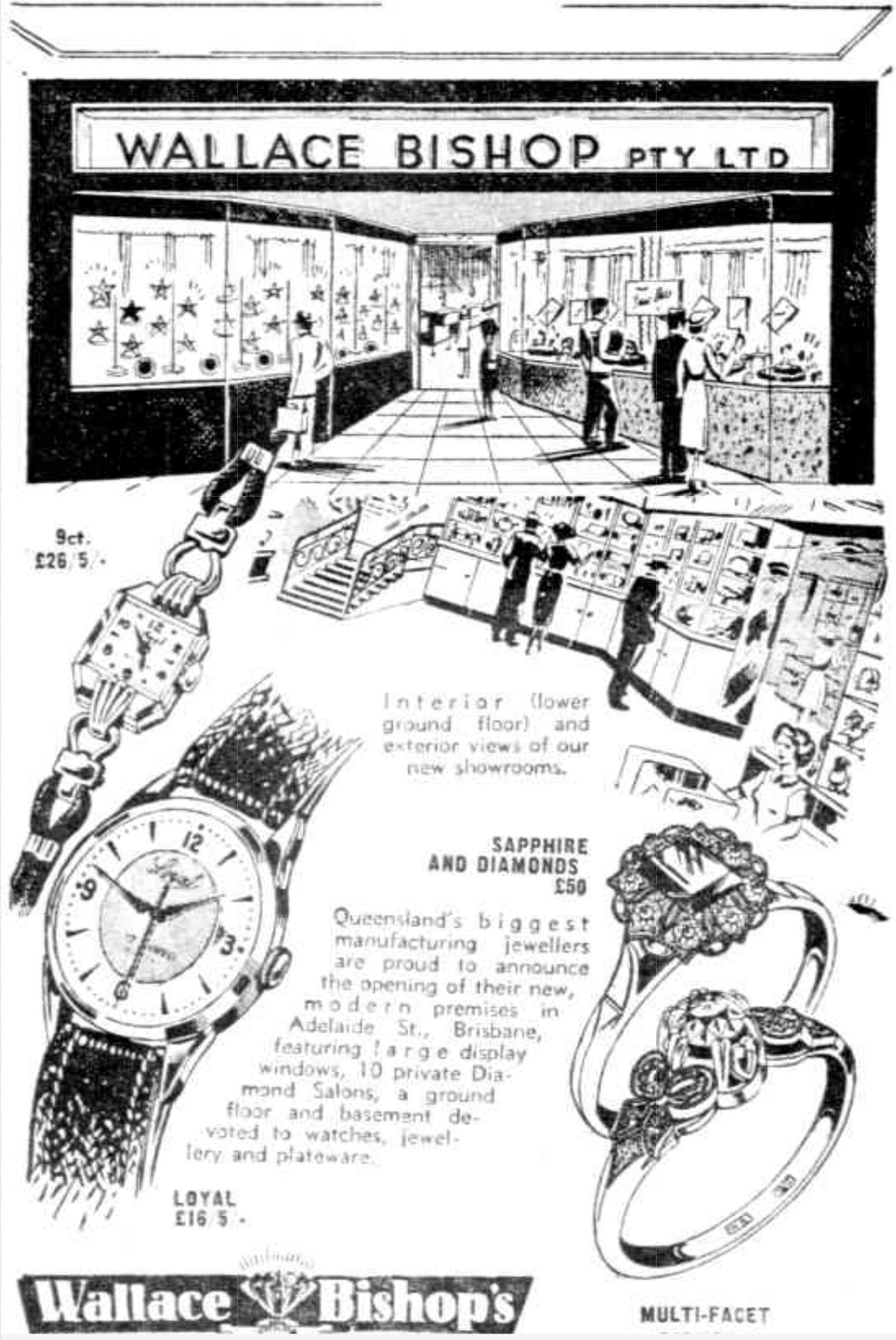
Advertising by Wallace Bishop, 1954

With over 50 stores and more than 500 employees, Wallace Bishop is one of Australia’s oldest and most successful family businesses. In 1997, it acquired Hardy Brothers Jewellers, a 166-year-old business, which now operates 7 stores across Australia. It provided the opportunity to manufacture and market high-end jewellery products, and, significantly, the Melbourne Cup, which was hand-made in Brisbane for 17 years.

In 2019, Wallace Bishop was inducted into the Queensland Business Leaders Hall of Fame.

== See also ==
- List of oldest companies in Australia
