= Sarah Ann Jenyns =

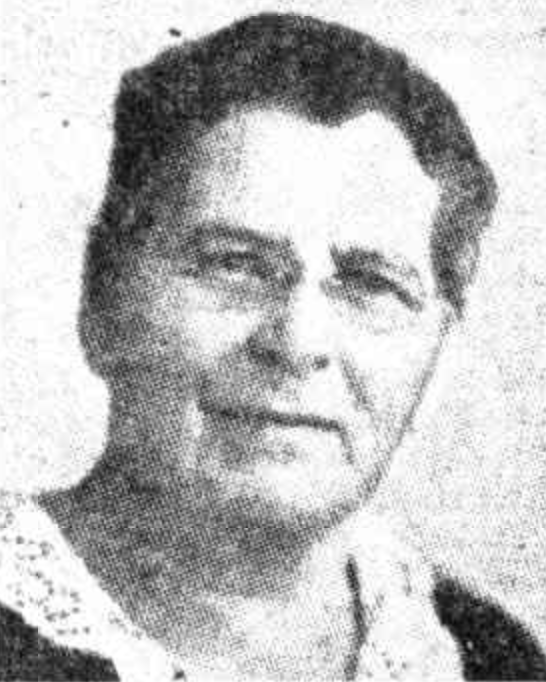
- Born: Sarah Ann Thompson; 1 March 1865; Largs, New South Wales, Australia
- Died: 29 February 1952 (aged 86); Brisbane, Queensland, Australia
- Burial place: South Brisbane Cemetery
- Occupation(s): trained nurse, businesswoman
- Known for: founded the Jenyns Patent Corset Pty Co
- Notable work: patented several corsets
- Spouse: Ebenezer Randolphus Jenyns (m. 1887)
- Children: 8
- Parents: Charles Thompson (father); Mary Thompson, née Bluford (mother)

Sarah Ann Jenyns (1865–1952) founded the Jenyns Patent Corset Pty Co with her husband Ebenezer Randolphus Jenyns (1865–1958) in Brisbane, Queensland, Australia in 1909. The business manufactured surgical instruments and pioneered surgical and aesthetic corsets for women, becoming one of the leading undergarment companies in the country and survived for more than 50 years.

== History ==
Sarah Ann Thompson was born on 1 March 1865 in Largs, New South Wales, to Mary Thompson, née Bluford, and her Scottish husband Charles Thompson. She married Ebenezer Randolph Jenyns on 5 October 1887.

Sarah, a trained nurse, married Ebenezer Randolph Jenyns, a surgical instrument maker and evangelical preacher on 5 October 1887 at the Burton Street Tabernacle, Woolloomooloo, Sydney. They settled in Brisbane in 1896. They had eight children and little money. Sarah felt a sharp pain one day when she bent over to lift a pail, and found that placing a pad inside her corset fixed the problem—except as soon as she moved, the pad dislodged and the pain returned.

== Jenyns Patent Corset Pty Co. ==
Sarah and Ebenezer operated a surgical instrument business from 1907. The business partnership and the marriage were both unsteady and from 1911, so Sarah opened her own business, patenting several designs in 1910–12. She designed a self-lacing corset with ‘Verterbrella’, intricately woven steel ‘bones’, in the back to support the spine, and in 1910–12 patented a series of corsets and 'improved abdominal belts'. The two founded the Jenyns Patent Corset Pty Co. in 1915 and registered it as a limited company in 1922. Sarah built a new 3-storey facility at 327 George Street, Brisbane in 1916. In 1925 she bought into even larger premises at 309–315 George Street, eventually employing over 200 people. By working with one of Australia’s leading surgeons she brought a scientific approach to her designs which were to win her support from medical professions in Australia, Europe, the United Kingdom, the United States and from manufacturers.

Sarah died on 29 February 1952 a and was buried in South Brisbane Cemetery.

== Awards ==
In 2014, Sarah Jenyns was posthumously inducted into the Queensland Business Leaders Hall of Fame in recognition of her leadership, entrepreneurship and innovation in design and manufacture of health and fashion garments, gaining worldwide recognition and national industry leadership.
