= Mincom (company) =

Australian software company

Mincom Pty Ltd
- Type: Private (part of ABB Group)
- Industry: Information Technology
- Founded: 1979
- Headquarters: Brisbane, Australia
- Area served: Worldwide
- Key people: Greg Clark (CEO) (resignation announced 17 August 2011)
- Number of employees: 1,250
- Website: mincom.com

Mincom Pty Ltd was an Australian software and services company that provides business software to industries including mining, public infrastructure, defence, oil and gas in more than 40 countries across North America, South America, Australia, South East Asia, Africa, and Europe. Mincom's headquarters were located in Brisbane, Queensland as well as with offices presence in Sydney, Melbourne, Perth, Western Australia.

Mincom was owned by Francisco Partners, a global private equity firm focused exclusively on investments in technology and technology-enabled services businesses. On 9 May 2011 the ABB Group acquired Mincom to expand their enterprise software business, Ventyx.

The company's name was originally devised as a contraction of the term "mining computing", as the company's initial products were aimed at the mining industry.

== Mincom Critical Inventory Optimization ==
MCIO is a software application purchased by Mincom Limited from Bruce McNaught and Associates Pty Ltd.

The application is claimed to offer the ability for any company holding a large inventory to substantially reduce the inventory value while improving the service level on critical stick items. Originally known as SIAM, MCIO integrates with Mincom's main Ellipse Asset management platform. It is designed to run on the Microsoft Windows family of operating systems. The current major release of MCIO is version 4.3 which is a fully multilingual version of the product.

== Awards ==
Mincom was inducted into the Queensland Business Leaders Hall of Fame in 2017.

== See also ==
- ABB
- Enterprise asset management
