= FINSIA =

Australasian association for financial services professionals

The Financial Services Institute of Australasia (FINSIA) is a professional institute for practitioners in the financial industry in Australia and New Zealand. FINSIA was formed in 2005 by the merger of the Australasian Institute of Banking and Finance (AIBF), founded 1886 and the Securities Institute of Australia (SIA), founded 1966.

In addition to its role as a professional membership body, FINSIA provides industry-recognized certifications and continuing professional development programs designed to enhance competency in financial services. The institute advocates for ethical leadership and governance within the industry, working closely with regulatory bodies such as the Australian Prudential Regulation Authority (APRA) and the Australian Securities and Investments Commission (ASIC) to promote best practices. FINSIA also facilitates industry research, policy discussions, and networking opportunities through conferences and mentorship initiatives, contributing to the professional growth of financial practitioners in Australasia.

Chris Whitehead is the Institute's CEO. FINSIA has about 8,000 members.

In 2007 the institute sold its education business to Kaplan, Inc. then part of the Washington Post.

The institute introduced the Financial Service Professional certificate in 2010.

FINSIA offers educational scholarships and support to its members.
