= 1999 Australia Day Honours =

The 1999 Australia Day Honours are appointments to various orders and honours to recognise and reward good works by Australian citizens. The list was announced on 26 January 1999 by the Governor General of Australia, Sir William Deane.

The Australia Day Honours are the first of the two major annual honours lists, the first announced to coincide with Australia Day (26 January), with the other being the Queen's Birthday Honours, which are announced on the second Monday in June.

== Order of Australia ==
=== Companion (AC) ===
==== General Division ====
Recipient	Citation	Notes
Professor Suzanne Cory	For service to science as a leader in the field of biomedical research, to the advancement of the understanding of the molecular basis of cancer, and to the community as an advocate for improved science education in schools and universities	
Kaarene Noelle Fitzgerald	For service to the community through commitment and support for Australian medical research into Sudden Infant Death Syndrome (SIDS), etc.	
Dr Malcolm Kenneth McIntosh	For service to excellence in scientific and technological research, to providing new opportunities for industries, and to Australian Defence industry and science policy	
Dr Lowitja (Lois) O'Donoghue, CBE AM	For public service through leadership to Indigenous and non-indigenous Australiansin the areas of human rights and social justice, particularly as chairperson of the Aboriginal and Torres Strait Islander Commission	
Nicholas Theodore James Paspaley	For service to business development and trade, to the Australian pearling industry, and to the community	

=== Officer (AO) ===
==== General Division ====
Recipient	Citation	Notes
Norman Ross Adler	For service to business and commerce, to the promotion of the arts in South Australia, and to the community	
Paul Hunter Barratt	For service to public administration, public policy development, business and international trade	
The Honourable Dr Jack Gordon Beale	For service to the development of public policy in the areas of conservation, resource development and environmental engineering, and as a member of the New South Wales Parliament	
Brian Bull, APM	For service to crime prevention through the promotion and implementation of the concept of community policing, to the Western Australia Police Service, and to the community	
Professor David James Burke	For service to science and medicine, particularly in the field of clinical neurophysiology in the areas of research and education, and to the community through medical charities and lay organisations	
Alison Christine Bush	For service to nursing and to the community, particularly in the provision of primary and maternal health care to Indigenous Australians and as an advocate of Indigenous Health Worker Training	
Professor Donald John Chisholm	For service to medicine and medical research as a leader in the fields of diabetes research, patient care, medical education and the organisation of medical services	
Dorothy Joan Dunn	For service to the community, particularly as an advocate of the role of rural women in agricultural industry policy and as Foundation President of Australian Women in Agriculture	
Neil James Eagle	For service to water resource management, to the citrus industry, and to the community, particularly through support for improved health services and aged care facilities	
Trevor James Flugge	For service to the Australian grains industries in the areas of industry reform, research and development, and international grains marketing	
Rosemary Irene Foot	For service to the community, particularly in the areas of health, the visual arts, women's interests and politics	
Joan Maie Freeman	For service to science in the field of nuclear physics and to the environment as an advocate for social responsibility in scientific research	
Dr John Eugene (Fred) Gilligan	For service to medicine, particularly intensive care medicine, and to the development of medical retrieval systems	
John Edward Hatton	For service to the community by raising public awareness of social issues and as an advocate for social change	
Thomas Andrew Hazell	For service to multiculturalism, to the arts, to the Catholic Church in Melbourne, and to the community as a whole	
Sydney Howard	For service in contributing to the success of community events and public celebrations as a leading international designer and operator of pyrotechnic displays, and to the community through support for charitable organisations	
Dr Graeme Thomas Killer	For service to the veterans' community through commitment to enhancing health care services, and in the area of developing cost effective and improved health care for Defence personnel	
Dr Alban Jude Lynch, AM	For service to the mining industry, particularly in the area of research and education on the application of engineering technology in minerals processing	
His Excellency John Philip McCarthy	For service to the enhancement of Australia's international reputation and to the development of Australian regional policy	
Gregory John Norman, AM	For service to the community, particularly youth, through philanthropic support for research into treatments for childhood cancer and in the development of mentoring programmes for junior golfers	
Geraldine Marie Paton	For service to the community through the media, medical research and the arts	
The Honourable Peter Elliot Rae	For service to business and commerce, to the Federal and Tasmanian Parliaments, and to the Aboriginal community of Flinders Island	
Margaret Critchley Smith	For service to women in rural and remote areas as National President of the Country Women's Association of Australia	
Richard Harold (Dick) Smith	For service to the community, particularly as a benefactor to charitable organisations, to business and commerce, and to the aviation industry	
Dr Bruce William Stillman	For service to scientific research in the field of molecular biology, particularly through the analysis of DNA replication in the living cell	
Professor Geoffrey Ian Taylor	For service to medicine in the field of plastic and reconstructive surgery, and the transfer of living bone grafts by utilising micro-vascular techniques	
Leo Gerard Williams RFD	For service to Rugby Union football, to the law, and to the community	

==== Military Division ====
Branch	Recipient	Citation	Notes
Army	Major General Peter James Dunn, AM	For distinguished service to the Australian Army and the Australian Defence Force in the field of land force development, as the Military Head of the Defence Efficiency Review Secretariat and as the Head of the Defence Personnel Executive Personnel	
Air Force	Air Vice-Marshal Peter Gervase Nicholson, AM	For distinguished service to the Royal Australian Air Force, particularly as the Air Commander Australia	

=== Member (AM) ===
==== General Division ====
Recipient	Citation	Notes
Robin Elizabeth Amm	For service to education and to educational administration, particularly as principal, Newtown High School of the Performing Arts, and to the community	
Emeritus Professor Reginald Thomas Appleyard	For service to education through the research and teaching of economic history, migration and population studies, and economics	
Philip John Bacon	For service to the visual and performing arts as a benefactor and supporter	
Heather Ann Barton	For service to youth through Guides Victoria	
Solomon David Bellear	For service to the Aboriginal community, particularly in relation to the administration and development of health policies	
Douglas George Biggs	For service to the community, particularly through Rotary International	
Associate Professor James Crawford Biggs	For service to medical research in the field of haematology and bone marrow transplantation, and to the Australian Foundation for the Peoples of the South Pacific	
Dr Frederick Archibald Bloch	For service to youth and Australian Rules football through the Adelaide University Football Club	
Professor James Maurice Bowler	For service to earth sciences, particularly through the study of landscape and environmental history, and to Australian prehistory	
Professor Kenneth John Bowman	For service to education and to optometry, particularly through the Queensland University of Technology	
Max Reginald Boyd	For service to local government in the Tweed Shire	
Roslin Elizabeth Brennan	For service to children and school education, particularly through the Federation of Parents' and Citizens' Associations of New South Wales	
Dr Peter Brayton Brown	For service to medicine, particularly in the field of plastic and reconstructive surgery, and to overseas medical aid programmes	
Valerie Elizabeth Browning	For service to international humanitarian aid through promoting health and literacy programmes in the Horn of Africa	
Associate Professor Neil Buhrich	For service to psychiatry, and to the community	
Captain Richard John Burgess	For service to the community, particularly through the Port of Devonport Authority, and to the preservation of Australian maritime history	
Dr Harold Burnell Carter	For service to the wool industry, particularly the study of factors affecting wool growth, and for research into the life and work of Sir Joseph Banks	
John Stanley Castles	For service to the profession of architecture, and to the community	
Gordon Maitland Chater	For service to the arts as an actor, and to the welfare of the artistic community through the Actors' Benevolent Fund	
Sir Rupert William John Clarke, MBE	For service to the community and the Victorian Amateur Turf Club	
Professor Richard Clough	For service to landscape architecture in Australia	
The Most Reverend Edmund John Patrick Collins	For service to the community through the Catholic Church as Bishop of Darwin, and to the Aboriginal community	
Dr Richard Graeme Cook, RFD	For service to the profession of dentistry in the field of orthodontics, and to the community	
The Reverend William David Crews	For service to youth and the disadvantaged through the Uniting Church in Australia and the Exodus Foundation	
Emeritus Professor Robert Woodhouse Crompton	For service to science, particularly physics education and research, to the Australian Science Olympiads, and to the community through the National Brain Injury Foundation	
Benjamin Cropp	For service to maritime and coastal conservation, and to the promotion and awareness of the Australian marine environment as a documentary film maker	
Lindsay Norman Cunningham	For service to sailing as a yacht designer and builder	
Stanley Fraser Davey	For service to the Aboriginal community, particularly in highlighting social justice issues and acting as an advocate for the establishment of effective regional Indigenous organisations	
Ian Norman Davies	For service to the community, particularly through the Victims of Crime Association in Queensland	
Herbert Henry Dawson	For service to country music	
Professor Michael Antony Denborough	For service to medicine, medical research and education, and to the community	
William Bruce Dureau	For service to international relations, particularly through promoting Australia's bilateral relationship with Japan and Indonesia	
Donald John Durie	For service to the community, particularly through Rotary International	
John Anthony Eales	For service to Rugby Union football, particularly as captain of the Wallabies, and to the community	
Wendy Sylvia Faulkes	For service to the community through the implementation of alternative dispute resolution programmes	
Peter James Ferris	For service to community health as an administrator	
Brian Fisher	For service to children with hearing impairments through enhancing and developing education and audiology services	
Frank John Ford	For service to the development of the performing arts in South Australia as a director, playwright, administrator and educator	
Colin James Fuller	For service to the development of the Northern Territory through the provision of infrastructure, land management, conservation and tourism projects	
Captain Robert John Garven	For service to the Salvation Army, and as a senior chaplain of the New South Wales Fire Brigades	
Robert James Gear	For service to surf lifesaving in Queensland, and to the community	
Dr Francis Bathurst Halliday	For service to medicine in the field of ophthalmology, particularly in the area of retinal dystrophy, and in the establishment of the Genetic Eye Foundation	
Dr Keith Wallington Hills Harris, ED	For service to medicine and to public health, particularly the prevention of tuberculosis in Australia and overseas, and to the community	
Dr William John Hartley	For services to veterinary pathology and the investigation of wildlife diseases	
Richard Gilbert Mungo Harvey	For service to primary industry in the fields of animal and plant pest control, and land management	
Ronald George Harvey, CVO	For service to the promotion of basketball in Australia	
Dr Dorothy Helena Herbert	For service to rural medicine through the Royal Flying Doctor Service, and to aviation through the Australian Women Pilots' Association	
Richard Gadsden Hicks	For service to medical service in the field of neurophysiology	
Francis George Hodgkinson	For service to the visual arts	
Dr Michael John Hind Hodgson	For service to medicine and medical education, particularly in the field of anaesthetics, and to hospital administration	
Patricia Margaret Howard	For service to the community, particularly the care of children through the organisation, Accepting Children Everywhere.	
Allan John Hoy	For service to the media through the promotion of local and regional television services, and to the community	
Beverley Ann Hunt	For service to community health, particularly through the Breast Cancer Support Service	
Graeme Spence Irvine	For service to international humanitarian aid through World Vision International	
Kerry William James	For service to the community, particularly through fundraising for medical research	
Douglas Samuel Jones, RFD	For service to the law, particularly in the field of construction law, and to the development of arbitration and alternative dispute resolution methods	
Donald Gordon Keith	For service to primary industry as an apiarist	
Emeritus Professor Jiro Kikkawa	For service to ecological research, to conservation and to the ornithology of Australian tropical rainforests	
Dr Richard John Kimber	For service to medicine, particularly in the field of haematology, and to the Australian Red Cross Society	
Margaret Langley	For service to education through the Marbury School in South Australia	
Dr Gary Robert Lillicrap	For service to the development of ophthalmology services in North Queensland, to the Trachoma and Eye Health Programme for Indigenous People, and to the community	
Mary Catherine Lopez	For service to the performing arts and to the development of talented young Australian entertainers	
Dr Gerhart Lowenthal	For service to science, particularly in the field of radioisotope metrology, and to adult education	
Edward Stanislaus Madden	For service to the community through the Australian Volunteer Coast Guard Association	
Associate Professor Donald Roger Marshall	For service to medicine, particularly in the field of plastic and reconstructive surgery, and to Interplast	
The Reverend John Edward Mavor	For service to the Uniting Church in Australia, and to the international community through Austcare and the Australian Council for Overseas Aid	
Robert John Mayo	For service to surf lifesaving in South Australia	
Ernest McCain	For service to the furnishing manufacturing industry	
Paul Matthew McGrath	For service to shipping through the Australian Maritime Safety Authority	
Ross David McKinnon	For service to horticulture, particularly as the curator in charge of the Brisbane Botanic Gardens, and to the Australian nursery and garden media industries	
Audrey Emma McLaughlin	For service to softball as a player, coach and administrator	
James Donald Merralls, QC	For service to the judiciary and to the legal profession as the editor of the Commonwealth Law Reports	
Richard John Mills	For service to music, particularly as a composer	
Dr Cathryn Jean Mittelheuser	For service to women, particularly through the Lyceum Club	
Dr Patricia Sue Morey	For service to the development and promotion of improved public health services	
Elsie Jean Morison-Kubelik	For service to music as an opera singer	
Michael Matthew Moroney	For service to the community of Tamworth	
John Arthur Moule	For service to the Association for the Blind, and to the community	
Raymond John Norman	For service to the community through youth, sporting and health organisations	
Phyllis Mary Norton	For service to the community of Snug	
Emeritus Professor Coleman Anthony O'Flaherty	For service to tertiary education, and to the community	
Professor Archibald Robert Oliver	For service to engineering education and research, particularly in the fields of timber drying processes, aerodynamics and fluid mechanics	
Dr Suzanne Mary Packer	For service to child welfare, to paediatric medicine and to the community	
The Reverend Thomas Ian Paxton	For service to the community, particularly in the area of aged care services	
Kenneth Ernest Pech	For service to local government in Western Australia	
Anthony Mark Perich	For service to the community through charitable organisations	
John Vincent Plunkett	For service to business and industry through the promotion of technological innovation	
Paul Crispin Rigby	For service to the newspaper industry as an editorial cartoonist	
Gwendoline Blanche Roderick	For service to women, particularly through the National Council of Women of Australia	
Christopher John Roper	For service to the development of continuing legal education	
Joyce Ross	For service to the visual and performing arts in South Australia	
Ronald John Rowland	For service to the pharmaceutical industry, and to the community	
Adjunct Professor Walter George Ryan	For service to civil engineering, particularly in the area of concrete technology, and to people with disabilities through INALA	
Dr Kay Elizabeth Bass Saunders	For service to Australian history as a scholar, author and commentator on social issues	
Roy Trevor Schmidt	For service to the Royal Agricultural Society of New South Wales	
John Fraser Sewell	For service to the community, to the Australian seed industry, and to local government	
Professor Maria Skyllas-Kazacos	For service to science and technology, particularly in the development of the Vanadium Redox Battery as an alternative power source	
Brian John Smithies	For service to the Tasmanian dairy industry	
Kathryn Kaye Spence	For service to neo-natal nursing, particularly through education programmes and professional associations	
Kathleen Dolores Stanton	For service to sports administration through Sport SA and as a member of state and federal sporting organisations	
Jennifer Gay Stanzel	For service to people with disabilities, particularly through the organisation, Information on Disability Equipment Access and Services Inc. (IDEAS)	
Peter Raymond Abercron Stapleton	For service to surf lifesaving in Australia and overseas	
Dr Antanas Vytautas (Tony) Stepanas	For service to medicine in the field of endocrinology and to the development of diabetic patient support services	
Joan Ellen Stevenson	For service to youth through Guides Australia, and to women's organisations	
Susan Virginia Taylor	For service to sport, particularly netball, as an administrator, umpire, coach and player	
Dr Diana Marmion Temple	For service to medical and scientific research, particularly in the field of respiratory pharmacology, as an advocate for the role of women in science and in promoting an understanding of science by the general public	
Margaret Johnstone (Renee) Thonard	For service to community health, particularly to people with multiple sclerosis in South Australia	
Denis Vivian Campbell Tricks	For service to the community, particularly through the Hugh Williamson Foundation	
Dr David Ian Tudehope	For service to medicine, particularly in the field of neo-natal paediatrics, and to the Multidisciplinary Growth and Development Clinic	
Edward Turner	For service to the community, particularly through advocacy for aged people	
Esme Catherine Tyson	For service to the community through the Alice Springs Women's Shelter	
Carmelo Lino Vella	For service to the Maltese community as a newspaper editor	
Dr Winifred Lily Ward	For service to the community of the Illawarra region	
Emeritus Professor Harold Whitmore	For service to administrative law in Australia	
Samson Shu Leung Wong	For service to the community and to multiculturalism in the ACT region	
Dr Barry George Wren	For service to medicine and women's health, particularly in the fields of hormone replacement therapy and research into menopause	
Dr Jacobus Hubertus Wynhoven	For service to engineering and the promotion and application of technological innovation	

==== Military Division ====
Branch	Recipient	Citation	Notes
Navy	Captain Nigel McMurry Carson	For exceptional service to the Royal Australian Navy, particularly as the Chief Staff Officer of the Royal Australian Navy's Test, Evaluation and Acceptance Authority	
Navy	Commodore Garvon Paul Kable	For exceptional service to the Royal Australian Navy and to the Australian Defence Force as the Head of the Australian Defence Staff, London, and as the Director General Maritime Development in the Australian Defence Headquarters	
Navy	Rear Admiral John Robert Lord	For exceptional service to the Royal Australian Navy and to the Australian Defence Force as the Commodore Flotillas at Maritime Command Headquarters, and as the Commander, Northern Command	
Army	Colonel Wayne Thomas Bowen, SC	For exceptional service to the Australian Army in the field of land force development and as the Commanding Officer of the 5th/7th Battalion of the Royal Australian Regiment	
Army	Principal Chaplain John Raymond Butler	For exceptional service to the Australian Army as the Senior Chaplain of Land Command at Land Headquarters, and as the Principal Chaplain - Army	
Army	Brigadier Neil David Graham	For exceptional service to the Australian Army in the field of material procurement, management and development	
Army	Lieutenant Colonel David Lindsay Morrison	For exceptional service to the Australian Army as the Brigade Major of the 3rd Brigade, as the Staff Officer Grade One Preparedness and Mobilisation at Army Headquarters, and as the Commanding Officer of the 2nd Battalion of the Royal Australian Regiment	
Army	Professor Karl Heinz Rieckmann	For exceptional service to the Australian Army and to the Australian Defence Force in the field of malaria research, and as the Director of the Australian Army Malaria Institute	
Army	Brigadier Jeffrey Bruce Wilkinson	For exceptional service to the Australian Defence Force in command, regimental and staff appointments, particularly as the Command of the Logistics Support Force and Commander of the Australian Service Contingent, Bougainville	
Air Force	Wing Commander Christopher Lawrence Deeble	For exceptional service to the Royal Australian Air Force in the fields of project development and operations	
Air Force	Air Commodore Raymond John Gibson	For exceptional service to the Royal Australian Air Force as the Director of Air Force Planning, and as the Chief of Support at Headquarters Air Command	

=== Medal (OAM) ===
==== General Division ====
Recipient	Citation	Notes
June Patricia Adams	For service to the community of the Tumut Shire	
Sister Josephine Mary Agnew	For service to nursing, particularly through the Mater Private Hospital	
John Anagnostou	For service to the Greek community and to veterans through the Greek Sub-Branch of the Returned and Services League of Australia	
Carmelita Bestil Anderson	For service to women's lawn bowls	
June May Angus	For service to the community through the NSW Branch of the Presbyterian Women's Association	
Henri Walter Aram	For service to the community and to improving public awareness and understanding of the principles of finance and investment	
Haneef Badrudeen	For service to Australian Asian relations through the Sri Lankan and Indian communities, and for services to the Australian Muslim community	
Dolores Ball	For service to the community as founder of the Renal and Pancreas Transplant Support Group	
Phyllis Margaret Bannan	For service to the care and support of people with intellectual disabilities in South Australia	
Roy Charles Barber	For service to veterans and their families, particularly through the POW Association and the TPI Association in Tasmania	
Barbara May Barnes	For service to the community and to youth through the Bankstown Youth Foundation	
Margaret Clare Barrie	For service to youth through Guides Australia	
Charles Robertson Barton	For service to the promotion of Australian classical composers and performers as programmer, on-air presenter and producer	
Reuben Roy Basham	For service to veterans and to the community	
Peter Francis Batey	For service to the arts as a producer and director, and to the community	
Reginald Ryan Baxter	For service to the Lismore community, particularly through sporting groups and local government	
Janet Alison Beckman	For service to the community, particularly through library services and animal welfare	
Christine Elizabeth Berry	For service to animal welfare, particularly through the Donkey Society of New South Wales	
Kaye Lesley Birkbeck	For service to the welfare of children as a foster parent	
Emma Marie Blackhurst	For service to the community of Dunsborough	
Dr John (Hans) Bollig	For service to the community, particularly in the areas of aged care and youth development	
Walter Spencer Bough	For service to the community of Cheltenham	
Councillor Sylvia Janet Brandenburg	For service to local government, to regional development, and to the community of the Lake Grace district	
Janine Minna Bravery	For service to the visual arts	
William Brown	For service to the community through the Victorian State Emergency Service	
Dr Anthony Roland Buhagiar	For service to medicine in the field of general practice, and to the Maltese community	
Arthur William Bullen	For service to youth, particularly through scouting and junior rugby union football	
Dianne Marie Burge	For service to community health, particularly through the Arthritis Foundation of South Australia	
George Alfred Burne	For service to the Australian film industry as a cinematographer	
Jack Butcher	For service to the community through brass bands and choirs	
Doris Marjorie Byrne	For service to the community of Allora and district	
Michael John Byrnes	For service to surf lifesaving	
Ronald John Cahill	For service to the community through charitable organisations, and to the law	
Dr Robert Norman Castle	For service to the community of Stawell as a general practitioner	
Clifford Ernest Chamberlain	For service to the community of Albury-Wodonga and to the preservation of local history	
Richard Thomas Chant	For service to the community of North Queensland as a sports commentator	
Kevin Chapman	For service to the media as a parliamentary broadcaster, and to the community	
Russell William Clark	For service to the community through the Port Fairy Folk Festival, and to local government	
Dr Miles De Courcy Clarke	For service to the community, particularly through St John Ambulance	
Alice Lillian Coleman	For service to the community of the Atherton Tablelands	
Dr Stephen Clive Cox	For service to oral health programmes through the United Mission to Nepal	
June Alison Craw	For service to arts administration through the Queensland Theatre Company	
Elizabeth Martin Crichton	For service to the community of Nyngan	
Aldo Arthur Crotti	For service to the community as a philanthropist	
Charles Lawrence Curley	For service to charitable organisations within Australia and overseas	
Gary John Cuthbert	For service to youth through sport	
Captain Jack Kenneth Davenport	For service to aviation safety	
Richard Hasse Davis	For service to tourism, particularly through the Caravan Parks Association of South Australia	
Elizabeth Mary Davis	For service to the community, particularly through the Royal Botanic Gardens, Sydney	
Aris Egbertus de Jong	For service to conservation, to environmental education, and to entomology	
Selby Verdon Dean, DCM	For service to local government and to the community	
Lynda Susan Dean	For service to the tea tree industry and to the community	
Kevin John Dent	For service to the community, particularly through the New South Wales State Emergency Service	
Roslyn Marion Derrett	For service to regional cultural development and to tourism	
Maurice George Dick	For service to veterans and their families through the Limbless Soldiers’ Association of Australia	
Donald Charles Dickson	For service to veterans, and to the community of Brunswick Heads	
Joan Ffoukes Doney	For service to the conservation of Australian native plants	
Dorothy Marion Douglas	For service to the community, particularly through the Salvation Army and St John Ambulance and various fundraising activities	
James William Dryden	For service to youth through the Scout Association and Guides Australia	
Douglas George Dufty	For service to marine rescue and boating safety	
William Henry Dunn	For service to the Penrith community	
Henry William Dunn	For services to the community and to veterans	
Dr Arthur James Dyer	For service to amateur theatre	
Dr Bruce Berkeley Edelman	For service to the community and to local government	
Alfred William Eden	For service to the communities of Portarlington and the Bellarine Peninsula	
Bruce William Edmunds	For service to sailing	
Stanley John Edwards	For service to the community of Dunsborough	
Angelo Efstathis, CBE	For service to the community as a philanthropist	
Ronald Charles Ellis	For service to the Australian Red Cross Society, particularly through the development of fundraising services	
Dr Ernest Bert England	For service to community health, particularly through the Australian Rotary Health Research Fund	
Francis Campbell Evans	For service to the community of Cessnock, particularly through scouting and the Lions Club	
Miles Farmer	For service to people with disabilities through the Riding for the Disabled Association	
Elaine Kaye Farmer	For service to surf lifesaving	
Graeme Arthur Ferguson	For service to people with visual impairments	
Gunhilde Leopoldine Ferris	For service to classical dance as a teacher and performer	
Henry Leslie Firth	For service to motor racing as a driver, team manager and engineer	
Helen Elizabeth Fletcher	For service to people with disabilities through the Aid and Recreation Association for the Disabled	
Ruth Ann Fletcher	For service to youth through Guides Australia	
Olive Jacqueline Jean Fowler	For service to the community of Camden	
Michael William Fraser	For service to local government and to the community	
Walter Robert Freeman	For service to the community through establishing Probus Clubs, particularly in the Central North Coast Region	
John Edward Frost	For service to the performing arts	
Kenneth Frederick Gardiner	For service to the welfare of veterans and aged people	
Sidney Milton Garland	For service to the community through the Canterbury Bankstown Leagues Club	
William Edward Gaynor, RFD	For service to surf lifesaving	
Dr Laurence Edwin Georgeson	For service to the community, particularly through the Australian Red Cross	
Dr Arthur Malcolm Gill	For service to scientific research into bushfires and their effects on the environment	
Irene Stella Gillard	For service to veterans, and to the performing arts	
Lyall Leslie Gillespie, ISO	For service to the community, particularly through the research and documentation of the history of the Canberra region	
Leonard Matthew Gleeson	For service to the grain industry in Western Australia, and to the community	
Bernie Gold	For service to the Jewish community and to sport through Maccabi Australia	
Ethel Verna Goodman	For service to the community of Albany, particularly through the preservation and restoration of the National Trust property “Old Farm Strawberry Hill”	
Lynette Beverley Gray	For service to baton twirling as a coach and administrator	
Kenneth Donald Green	For service to youth, particularly through the Naval Reserve Cadets	
Beverley Joy Greet	For service to community health, particularly to women with HIV/AIDS	
Doris Lillian Gribble	For service to the community, particularly aged people	
Clive Mayor Hall	For service to the wool industry and futures trading, and to the community	
Reverend Dr Allen Harry Hall	For service to bilingual education programmes and the translation of Aboriginal languages	
Lady April Felicity Hamer	For service to the community through charitable organisations	
Harry Ronald Harborne	For service to the community of Moree	
Warren James Harris	For service to the community of Burnie, particularly through the Lions Club	
Clive Andrew Hartcher	For service to the paint industry through the development of polymers and coatings for specific industrial use	
Barbara Jean Hebden	For service to the promotion of music and the performing arts in Queensland	
James Haig Henderson	For service to former members of No 10 Repair and Salvage Unit and their families	
Michael Conway Hendrikson	For service to the craft of wheelwrighting	
Michael John Hennessey	For service to the community, particularly through the Granville Train Disaster Memorial Committee	
Norman Hibbert	For service as a fundraiser and supporter of community and charitable organisations	
Robert Martin Hitchcock	For service to Rugby Union football, particularly as coach of the Australian Rugby Union Women's team	
June Ellen Holdsworth	For service to the community of Camden	
Richard Alan Holland	For service to community health, particularly as a carer for people with HIV/AIDS	
Jessica Millicent Horder	For service to people with disabilities through Riding for the Disabled	
Sister Mary Alphonsus Horgan	For service to music education	
John Edward Hughes, APM	For service to the community	
Stanley Hunt	For service to the Chinese community	
Reverend Richard Warwick Hurford	For service to the Grafton community through the Anglican Church	
James Husband, BEM	For service to the welfare of veterans and their families through the 7th Battalion Royal Australian Regiment Association	
John Williss Hutchinson	For service to the wool industry, particularly as a shearing instructor and coordinator of training	
Dr Elizabeth Rae Jane	For service to medicine in the field of general practice, and to the community through Soroptimist International	
John William Johnston	For service to the community of Scone	
Alwynne Beryl Jona	For service to the community through the Victorian Association for the Blind	
Elaine Jones	For service to the community of Narrabri	
Wlodzimierz Anthony Jucha	For service to veterans and their families, particularly through the Polish Ex-Servicemen's Association and the 8th Battalion Association	
Despina Kalaf	For service to the Greek community	
John Maxwell Kidd	For service to the community, particularly youth, and to Rugby Union football	
Susanne Gay King	For service to squash	
Dr Robert Peter Knight	For service to the development of veterinary services in the community of Terang and Noorat	
Matti Allan Kolkka	For service to surf lifesaving	
Maria Krupska	For service to the Polish community	
Leonard Bruce Kubbere	For service to the community and to tourism through the establishment of the Featherdale Wildlife Park	
Esme Lane	For service to youth through the scouting movement	
Harold Murray Lang	For service to local government and to the community	
John Harold Albert Lang	For service to the community through charitable and service organisations	
Kevin Raymond Langdon	For service to the community through the Motor Neurone Disease Association of New South Wales	
Betty Irene Lawrence	For service to the community of Red Cliffs	
Sylvia May Le Marquand	For service to youth through Guides Australia, and to the community	
Claire Elizabeth Lee	For service to the St Mary's Polio Rehabilitation Centre in Andra Pradesh, India, as a missionary and physiotherapist	
Philip Leong	For service to the community of Townsville	
Basil Richard Lewers	For service to recreational and sport fishing	
David Barton Lewis	For service to Rugby Union football	
Robert Alfred Little	For service to surf lifesaving	
Malcolm David Little	For service to the community	
Malcolm Reid Lobsey	For service to the community and to local government	
Jack Kingsley Looney	For service to veterans and to the community	
Dr Peter Robin Macneil	For service to rural medicine, and to community health	
John Richard Maidment	For service to Australia's cultural heritage through the Organ Historical Trust of Australia	
Tamara Makeev	For service to the Russian Orthodox community, and to the Ethnic Communities Council of the ACT	
Marie Amy Manning	For service to the development of community information services in South Australia	
Adrian Edward Mannix	For service to the communities of Drysdale and the Bellarine Peninsula	
Stephen John Mason	For service to veterans as editor of the Australian Special Wireless Group Association newsletter	
Linda Doone Mayne	For service to people with disabilities through the Sunshine Welfare and Remedial Association	
John Anthony McAuliffe	For service to junior surf lifesaving, and to lawn tennis	
George McBride	For service to the community through the Lions Club and Meals on Wheels	
Bettine Patricia McCaughan	For service to the arts, particularly as a teacher of voice	
Ronald David McClure	For service to the sugar cane industry, particularly in the Mackay region	
Craig John McDermott	For service to cricket and to the community	
Bevan John McDonald	For service to the community through the Salvation Army and Rotary	
Albert Louis McDonell	For service to veterans and to the community	
Graeme McGee	For service to the community, particularly through Fire and Emergency Services, and to competitive long bore shooting events	
Shauna Fogarty McGilvray	For service to the community through the Graffiti Alert Project and the Legal Arts Crew	
Annette Jean McGuiness	For service to community health, and to the welfare of the people of Wedge Island	
Cleveland John (Toby) McLeish	For service to the community, particularly as bandmaster of the Cowra Band	
Roslyn Anne McLeod	For service to the tourism industry, particularly through the promotion of Australian venues and facilities for conferences and meetings	
Roy Anthony Peter Medich	For service to the community through fund raising	
Robert John Meehan	For service to Vietnam veterans and to the preservation of military history	
Giuseppe Gianfranco Merizzi	For service to the Italian community	
Robert John Middleton	For service to lawn bowls	
William George Dyer Middleton	For service to conservation and the environment, and to land management	
Graeme Allan Millar	For service to the community of Gisborne	
John Antill Millett	For service to literature as editor of Poetry Australia	
Elizabeth Milnes	For service to pioneering and facilitating the development and infrastructure of Alice Springs	
Ethel May Mitchell	For service to the Uniting Church in Australia (Victorian Synod) and to the community	
Warren John Mitchell	For service to surf lifesaving through the development and introduction of the inflatable rescue boat (IRB)	
Eric George Molyneux	For service to veterans, particularly through the 2/43rd Battalion Association and the 10th Field Regiment Association	
Olive Marie Mulholland	For service to the community through welfare organisations of the Catholic Church	
Jean Estelle Neilson	For service to secondary education through the development of innovative programmes for girls, and to the community	
Gwendoline Newitt	For service to the community of Sorrell	
Stanley Alfred Newman	For service to the community, particularly through arts organisations, and to local government	
Jack Thomas Newman	For service to the community through the St Giles Society, and to architecture	
Ann Elizabeth Nichol	For service to aged care and to community health organisations	
Edna Louie Florence Norton-Baker	For service to the community as a fundraiser	
John Charles O'Donnell	For service to the performing arts, particularly through the Cairns Choral Society and the North Queensland Eisteddfod Council	
Richard Quin O'Neill	For service to the community, particularly through the Murgon Local Ambulance Committee	
Alma Doris O'Rourke	For service to nursing, particularly aged care	
Joseph Thaddeus O'Sullivan, OBE	For service to the community, particularly through the Australian-Irish Heritage Association, the Perth Centre of International Pen and the W B Yeats Society	
Jillian Anne Munro Nivison Oppenheimer	For service to heritage conservation and the environment, particularly through the National Trust of Australia (New South Wales)	
Kenneth Paul Owens	For service to the community of Redhead	
Daniel William Page	For service to the community of Blanchetown	
Thelma Ann Parish	For service to the community, particularly to children with intellectual disabilities and their families	
Albert Graham Parish	For service to the community, particularly to children with intellectual disabilities and their families	
Frank Passalaqua	For service to the community of Guildford	
Raymond Passmore	For service to veterans and to the community	
Henry John Paternoster	For service to cricket and to the community	
Francis William Pengelly	For service to lawn bowls and to the community	
Rosemary Jean Penn	For service to visually impaired people, particularly through the South Australian Blind Cricket Club	
Ann Penny	For service to ex-servicewomen and to the community	
Shirley Dawn Penny	For service to the community of Mildura and district	
Brian Neville Phemister	For service to the community through the New South Wales Retired Commissioned Officers’ Association	
Richard Robert Phillips	For service to the preservation of Australia's military history and heritage	
Stanley Robert Ping	For service to the community and to local government	
Sister Camille Poidevine	For service to community health and to music education	
John Crichton Polack	For service to the community, particularly to aged care	
The Reverend Joyce Sylvia Polson	For service to the community through the Anglican Church	
Norman Geoffrey Poulter	For service to conservation and the environment, particularly through the Speleological Research Group of Western Australia	
Fofy Prouzos	For service to the Greek community	
John Adrian Pulbrook	For service to the community of Morawa	
Colleen Mary Pyne	For service to education, and to the establishment of the North Australia Research Unit	
Mavis Irene Quartermaine	For service to youth through Guides Australia, and to the Eastern Goldfields Historical Society	
Elaine Phyllis Quickenden	For service to the environment through the Lamington Natural History Association	
Frederick Ernest Raffo	For service to youth and to veterans	
Eileen Patricia Redrup	For service to the community through charitable organisations	
Alan John Rees	For service to youth, particularly through the Australian Services Cadet Scheme	
Dr Edgar Richard Reid	For service to community medicine as a general practitioner, to veterans and to sporting groups	
George Percy Reid	For service to the community, particularly through the Coleambally Rescue Service and the Murrumbidgee Shire Bushfire Service	
Richard David Richmond Rex, BEM	For service to veterans and their families	
Joy Rice	For service to the community, particularly through the Radar Air Defence Branch of the Royal Australian Air Force Association	
Lyal Gordon Richardson	For service to local government and to the community	
Jean Ivy Lucy Roberts	For service to women in South Australia through the National Council of Women and the Churches of Christ	
The Reverend Father John Brendan Rogers	For service to the community, and to veterans and their families	
Robert George Romanes	For service to the community through the Recreation Industry Council of Australia	
Russell Sidney Ronan	For service to the community, particularly through Ballina Tidy Towns and Riding for the Disabled	
John Duncan Ross	For service to tourism and to charitable organisations	
Francis Thomas Rowell	For service to veterans	
Desmond John Rundle	For service to cricket administration	
Douglas John Rymer	For service to veterans and to the community	
Mavis Jean Salisbury	For service to the preservation and recording of community history	
Evelyn Margaret Scott	For service to children with intellectual disabilities, particularly through the ACT Down Syndrome Association	
Dr Dorothy Scott	For service to the discipline of social welfare through research and education, and to the development of specialist support services in the areas of ante- and post-natal depression and child abuse and neglect	
Walter Batchelor Scott-Smith	For service to youth through the Scout Association of Australia, and to the community	
John William Seager	For service to veterans through the New South Wales section of the Naval Association and the Submariners’ Association of Australia	
Helen Audrey Ray Searle	For service to athletics as a coach, administrator and competitor	
Christopher Sheed	For service to conservation and to the preservation of old growth forests	
Donald Herbert Sheffield	For service to the Institute of Municipal Engineering Australia	
Councillor Anthony John Sheridan	For service to local government	
Caroline Elisabeth Oswald Simpson	For service to the conservation of Australian heritage	
Bessie Sledge	For service to conservation and the environment through the Cooleman Ridge Parkcare Group	
Gwendoline Betty Small	For service to the community, particularly through the Raymond Terrace Ladies’ Bowling Club	
George Smith	For service to the welfare of veterans through the 7th Australian Division Association and the 2/25th Field Regiment Association	
Harry Smith	For service to aged people, and to sport	
Gavin John Staines	For service to music education, particularly through school and community bands	
Giovanni (John) Stefanelli	For service to the community through business and service organisations	
Margaret Frances Stevens	For service to the community of Roebourne, particularly through the Pilbara Aboriginal Church	
David George Stevens	For service to THE COMMUNITY OF ROEBOURNE, PARTICULARLY THROUGH THE PILBARA ABORIGINAL CHURCH. OAM S16 1999	
Maxwell Alan Wyndham Stone	For service to the community of Broadmeadows, and to local government	
Philip Gordon Swan	For service to the community, particularly children, as a Primary School Chaplain	
Mabel Dowling Taylor	For service to the community of Ballarat	
Clifford Frank Theilley	For service to cricket through the Adelaide and Suburban Cricket Association	
Zillah Helen Thomas	For service to the community of Katanning, particularly through the Good Samaritan Industries	
Enid Sydney Thompson	For service to the community, particularly through the Schizophrenia Fellowship of Victoria	
Joseph Thomsen	For service to veterans and to the community	
Moya Margaret Turner	For service to the community of Penrith	
Leonard James Turner, MBE	For service to veterans through the Western Australian Branch of the Returned and Services League of Australia	
Carole Turner	For service to the community, particularly through the Fairfield Community Aid and Information Service	
Frank Samuel Van Straten	For service to the performing arts as a historian, museum director and radio broadcaster	
Walter Rhodes Varley	For service to veterans through the 2/1st Australian Armoured Brigade Reconnaissance Squadron Association	
Joan Margaret Vaughan	For service to the community, particularly through surf lifesaving	
Peter Anthony Vodic	For service to the mining industry, and to the community of Broken Hill	
Dr William Downing Walker	For service to overseas medical aid programmes through Interplast	
John William Walker	For service to local government and to the community	
Helen Jean Walker	For service to the community, particularly aged people	
Jozef Waclaw Wasiel	For service to the Polish community	
Agnes Irene Webb	For service to the community, particularly through the United Hospital Auxiliaries	
Kim West	For service to the community through Life Education Victoria	
Penelope Jane White	For service to veterans as a physiotherapist	
Alexander Geoffrey Duckett White	For service to the community through the Vincent Fairfax Family Foundation	
Cynthia Joan Williams	For service to the community of Guyra	
Mary Louise Willsallen	For service to the sport of carriage driving, particularly through the Equestrian Federation of Australia and the Australian Driving Society	
Shirley Cameron Wilson	For service to the community, particularly through art organisations	
Harold Woodward	For service to youth through scouting, and to the community	
Bryan Åland Woolcock	For service to veterinary science, and to the community	
Ernest Eric Zillmann	For service to the observation, recording and promotion of Australia's natural history	

==== Military Division ====
Branch	Recipient	Citation	Notes
Navy	Chief Petty Officer David Wayne Gayford	For meritorious service to the Royal Australian Navy while serving in the Directorate of Naval Warfare	
Navy	Petty Officer Gary Richard Meehan	For meritorious service to the Royal Australian Navy in the field of community service	
Army	Warrant Officer Class One Kenneth Allan Golden	For meritorious service to the Australian Army as the Squadron Sergeant Major of the 30th Terminal Squadron, as the Regimental Sergeant Major of the 9th Transport Regiment, and as the Regimental Sergeant Major of the Logistic Support Team	
Army	Warrant Officer Class One Warren Kelvin Knight	For meritorious service to the Australian Army as the Trade Repair Warrant Officer, Port Moresby Workshop, Papua New Guinea, as the Artificer Sergeant Major at the Defence National Storage and Distribution Centre, and as the Artificer Sergeant Major of the 1st Combat Engineer Regiment	
Army	Major Allan Frederick Monaghan	For meritorious service to the Australian Army in the field of personnel administration, particularly as the Staff Officer Grade Two Honours and Awards, Army	
Army	Major Bruce Graeme O'Connor	For meritorious service to the Australian Army while serving with the 1st Commando Regiment	
Army	Major Andrew Michael Pedrazzini	For meritorious service to the Australian Defence Force in the field of computer networking	
Air Force	Warrant Officer Robert Rein Paarson	For meritorious service to the Royal Australian Air Force in the field of logistics operations	
