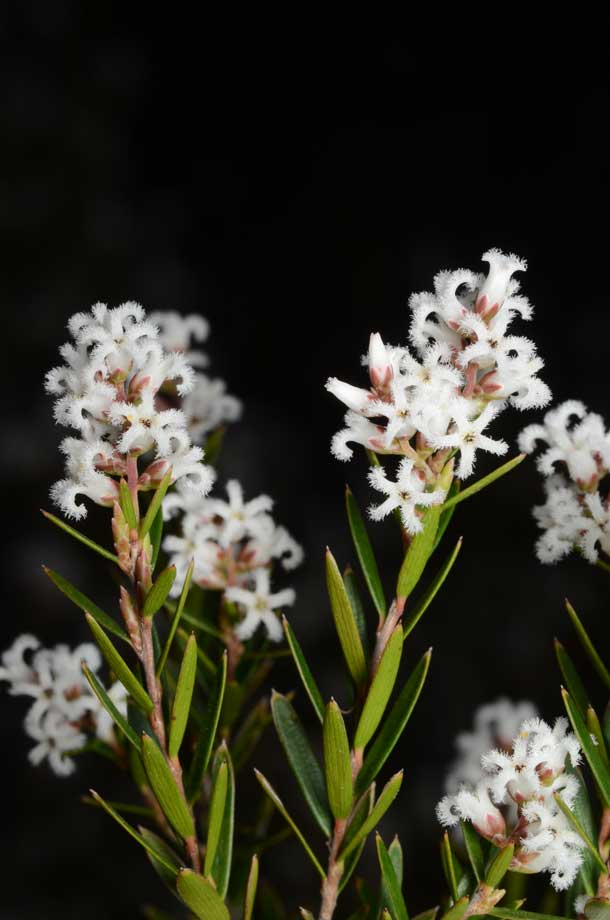
- Near Emmaville

Scientific classification
- Kingdom: Plantae
- Clade: Tracheophytes
- Clade: Angiosperms
- Clade: Eudicots
- Clade: Asterids
- Order: Ericales
- Family: Ericaceae
- Genus: Leucopogon
- Species: L. melaleucoides

Binomial name
- Leucopogon melaleucoides A.Cunn. ex DC.
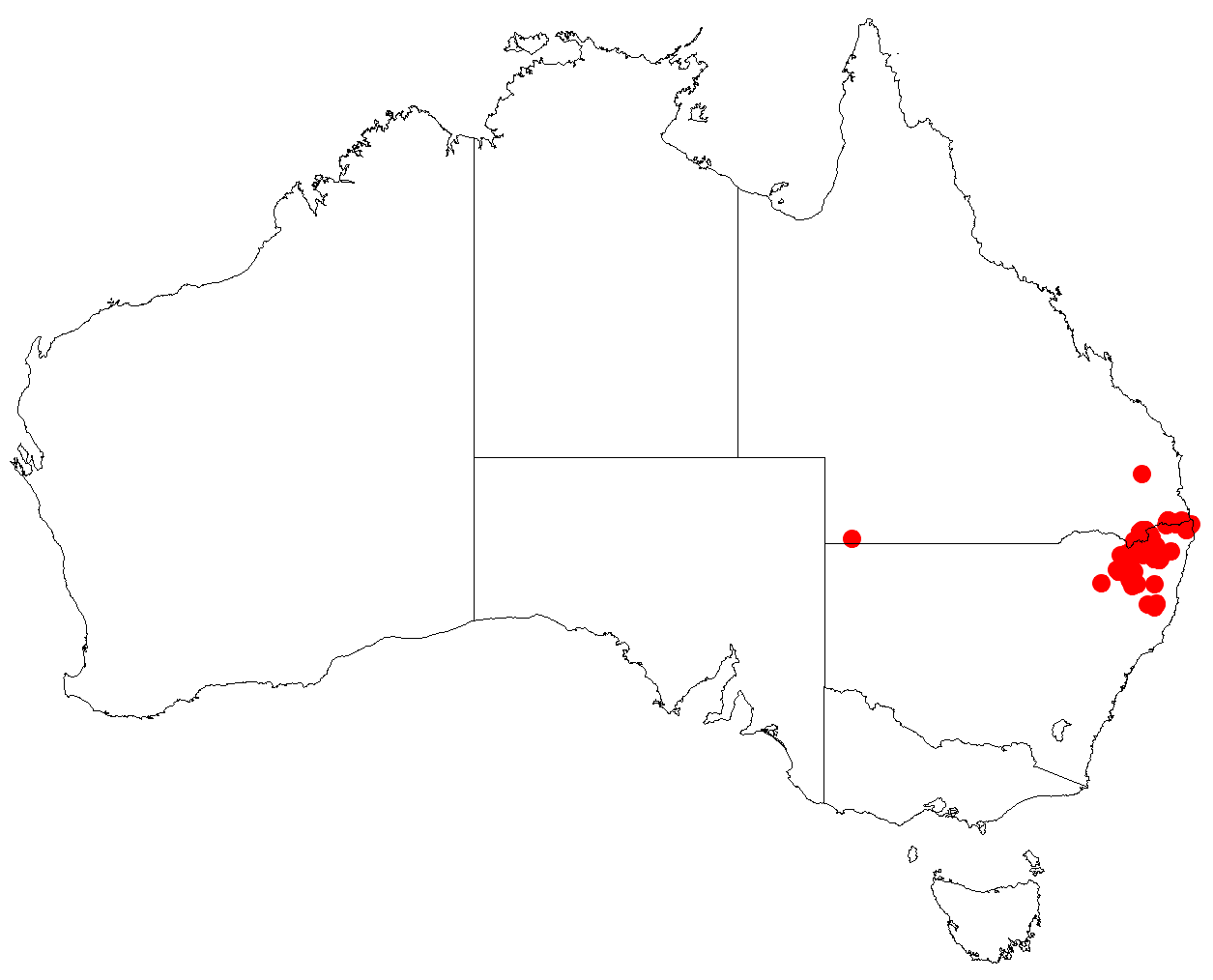
- Occurrence data from AVH

Synonyms
- Leucopogon linifolius A.Cunn. ex DC.; Styphelia linifolia (A.Cunn. ex DC.) F.Muell.

= Leucopogon melaleucoides =

Species of shrub

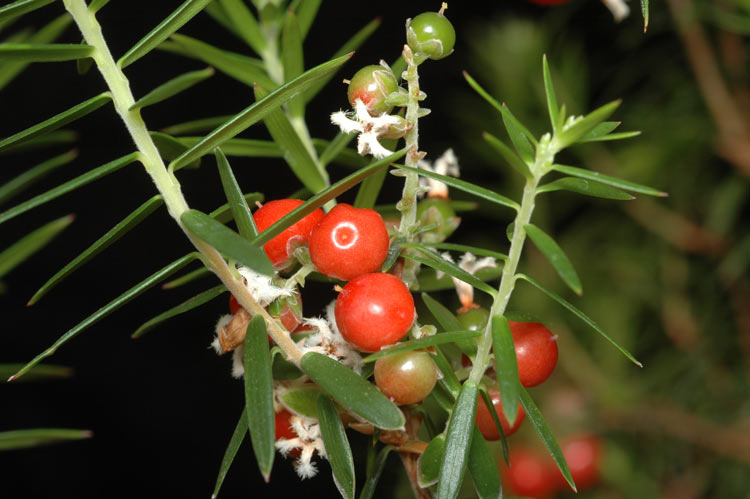
Fruit

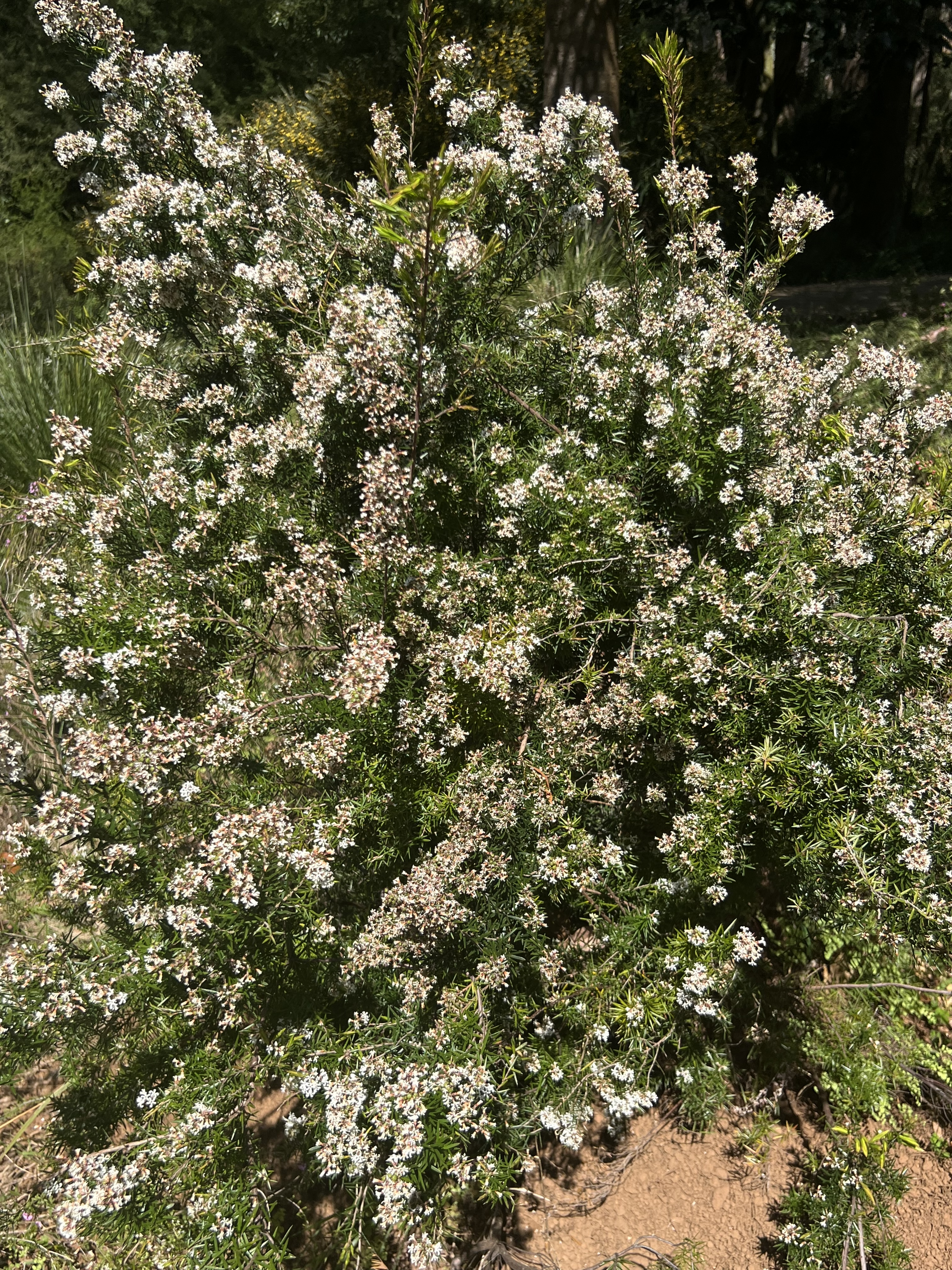
Habit

Leucopogon melaleucoides is a species of flowering plant in the heath family Ericaceae and is endemic to eastern Australia. It is an erect, densely branched shrub with lance-shaped or egg-shaped leaves, and white, tube-shaped flowers arranged in spikes in upper leaf axils.

== Description ==
Leucopogon melaleucoides is an erect, densely branched shrub that typically grows to a height of 0.7–1 m (2 ft 4 in – 3 ft 3 in), and has softly-hairy branchlets. The leaves are lance-shaped to egg-shaped with the narrower end towards the base, 5–20.8 mm (0.20–0.82 in) long and 0.6–2.8 mm (0.024–0.110 in) wide on a petiole up to 1 mm (0.039 in) long. The leaves are more or less glabrous and the lower surface is finely striated. The flowers are arranged in leaf axils in spikes of 3 to 15, up to 23 mm (0.91 in) long, with bracteoles 1.15–1.3 mm (0.045–0.051 in) long at the base. The sepals are 1.9–2.4 mm (0.075–0.094 in) long, the petals white and joined at the base to form a tube 1.9–2.8 mm (0.075–0.110 in) long with lobes 2.5–3.0 mm (0.098–0.118 in) long. Flowering occurs from June to November and the fruit is a glabrous, oval drupe 2.5–2.8 mm (0.098–0.110 in) long.

== Taxonomy ==
Leucopogon melaleucoides was first formally described in 1839 by Augustin Pyramus de Candolle in his Prodromus Systematis Naturalis Regni Vegetabilis, from an unpublished description by Allan Cunningham from specimens he collected near the Hunter River. The specific epithet (melaleucoides) means "melaleuca-like".

== Distribution and habitat ==
This leucopogon grows in the understorey of open woodland in south-eastern Queensland to as far south as Guyra in New South Wales.
