= Gordon Sturtridge =

Gordon Sturtridge may refer to:

- Gordon Sturtridge (Canadian football) (1929–1956), Canadian football player
- Gordon Sturtridge (rugby union) (1906–1963), Australian rugby union player
