= Wandi =

Wandi may refer to:

- Wandi Wandi, an Aboriginal Australian resistance leader and outlaw
- Wandi, Western Australia, Australia
- Wandi, Shandong (万第镇), town in Laiyang, Shandong, China
- Olga Miller (1920–2003), Australian historian, artist, author and Aboriginal elder whose traditional name was Wandi
