= Peter Andrews (scientist) =

Australian scientist

Peter Ronald Andrews is an Australian research scientist, biotechnology entrepreneur and was the first appointed Queensland Chief Scientist. He held the position from 2003 to 2010.

In 2004, Andrews was appointed an Officer of the Order of Australia (AO) "for service to scientific research, particularly drug design, and to the development of an Australian research-based pharmaceutical industry". He is a member of the governing council of the Royal Institution of Australia, and was elected a Fellow of the Australian Academy of Technological Sciences and Engineering (FTSE) in 1995.

Andrews was named as a Queensland Great in 2024.
