= Pixie Annat =

Australian nurse

Isobel Mary "Pixie" Annat MBE, OAM (18 March 1930 – 24 September 2022) was an Australian hospital matron, administrator and office bearer of the Royal Australian Nursing Federation (RANF). On Queensland Day in 2021, Annat was named as one of Queensland Greats by the Queensland Government.

== Early life ==
Isobel Mary Annat was born in Palmwoods, Queensland on 18 March 1930, to James Whammond Annat and Madoline Annat (née Chambers). She attended Palmwoods State School and Nambour State High School in Nambour, Queensland. Pixie died on 24 September 2022 in Brisbane.

== Nursing career ==
Annat commenced training as a nurse at Brisbane General Hospital in 1948. As a student nurse, she was active in the Student Nurses Unit (SNU) at the hospital and was president of the SNU from 1951 to 1952. In 1953 she completed her midwifery training at the Maroochy District Hospital in Nambour.

In June 1954, Annat and her twin sister, Ellen Madoline, travelled by ship to London, where they lived and worked until early 1956. On her return to Australia, Annat resumed her career as a nurse and was appointed Charge Sister of the Royal Brisbane Intermediate Wards for private patients. She had rejoined the RANF Queensland on returning to Australia and was a very active member of the Federation. In 1962 Annat accepted the position of assistant secretary and later secretary of the RANF Queensland, where she was employed from 1962 to 1965. In 1977, Annat was awarded an MBE in the Queen's Birthday Honours List.

Annat was St Andrew's War Memorial Hospital's longest-serving chief executive. Appointed Matron, later called Nursing Director, in 1965, she was chief executive officer from 1978 to 1992. During her time at St Andrew's, Annat worked closely with the hospital's Governing Board to raise money to advance the hospital's services. She helped launch one of the first neurosurgery units in 1979, the first nuclear medicine department at an Australian private hospital in 1983, and other improvements to medical and surgical practices. Working with cardiac specialists, Annat helped establish the St Andrew's Cardiac Investigation Unit and Catheter Laboratory which opened in 1984. The following year St Andrew's became the first private hospital in Queensland to perform open heart surgery.

In 1992, Annat was awarded a Medal of the Order of Australia (OAM) in the Queen's Birthday Honours List.

== Retirement ==
After her retirement in 1992, Annat turned to voluntary service. She had been a member of the Centaur Memorial Fund for Nurses since 1975 and in 2000 she was appointed honorary secretary.

From 2002 to 2014, Annat was president of the Lady Musgrave Trust, and served on the Lady Musgrave Trust Board for more than 20 years. She served on the Board of St Luke's Nursing Service from 1992 to 2005, was a Director of TriCare Ltd from 1994 to 2001, chaired the St Luke's Ethics Committee from 1995 to 2005 and since 2005 has been chair of the Spiritus Ethics Committee.

In 1998, she became honorary secretary of the Royal Brisbane Hospitals Nurses' Association Inc, a position she still holds. In 2007, she began serving as a volunteer at St Andrew's War Memorial Hospital. On 18 November 2014 she was awarded a UnitingCare Queensland Moderator's Medal for outstanding community service.

Her biography, Pixie Annat – Champion of Nurses, written by Colleen Ryan Clur, was published by University of Queensland Press in March 2015 and reviewed in the Weekend Australian Review.

In 2021, Annat was named as a Queensland Great. She died on 24 September 2022, at the age of 92.
