= Robyn Rodwell =

Australian medical scientist

- Education: Griffith University (PhD, 1992)
- Occupation: Medical scientist (retired)
- Known for: working in the haematology field for fifty years and helping establish the Queensland Cord Blood Bank
- Awards: Queensland Great (2009)

Robyn Lynette Rodwell is an Australian retired medical scientist.

== Career ==
=== Research and practice ===
Rodwell is best known for her work in the haematology field. Spanning a period of fifty years, her career commenced when she became a cadet medical scientist at the haematology blood bank at Brisbane's Mater Hospital.

After gaining a fellowship in haematology in 1982, Rodwell was appointed as the hospital's chief scientist of haematology.

In 1997, Rodwell was tasked with establishing the Queensland Cord Blood Bank (QCBB) at the Mater Mother's Hospital. Upon its inception, Rodwell was appointed as the QCBB's scientific director, becoming director in 2008.

She is also credited with establishing what became known as the "Sepsis Score" in blood counts which has proved to assist in predicting sepsis infections in newborn babies. This work was the subject of her doctoral thesis in which she explored the role of laboratory investigations, diagnosis, monitoring and therapy of neonatal sepsis.

=== Teaching ===
Rodwell has also been an adjunct associate professor at the School of Natural Sciences at Griffith University and at the School of Biomedical Sciences at the Queensland University of Technology.

== Recognition and retirement ==
In 2009, Rodwell was named as a Queensland Great. Rodwell retired in 2019.
