= Joe Baker (marine scientist) =

Australian rugby league footballer and marine scientist

Personal information
- Full name: Joseph Thomas Baker
- Born: 19 June 1932 Warwick, Queensland, Australia
- Died: 16 January 2018 (aged 85) Canberra, Australia

Playing information
Club
Years	Team	Pld	T	G	FG	P
1950–60	Easts Tigers	175	53	13	0	185
Representative
Years	Team	Pld	T	G	FG	P
1959	Queensland	1	0	0	0	0

Joseph Thomas Baker AO OBE FTSE (19 June 1932 – 16 January 2018) was an Australian marine scientist and rugby league footballer.

== Academic career ==
Born and raised in Warwick, Queensland, Baker moved to Brisbane in 1950 to commence studies at the University of Queensland and to take up a cadetship with the Commonwealth Scientific and Industrial Research Organisation.

Baker achieved a Bachelor of Science, majoring in organic chemistry before continuing on to study for his master's degree. In 1956, he was appointed a demonstrator at the University of Queensland's chemistry department.

When the University of Queensland opened a campus in Townsville in 1961, Baker became a foundation lecturer in the chemistry department, becoming an associate professor when the campus became James Cook University in 1970.

While working in North Queensland, Baker's research became more focused on marine science, particularly pertaining to the Great Barrier Reef. He became a founding member of the Great Barrier Reef Marine Park Authority, and is credited in helping the reef achieve World Heritage status in 1981.

Throughout his career, Baker served terms as Chief Scientist with the Department of Primary Industries & Fisheries, chairman of the Australian Heritage Commission and Commissioner for the Environment in the ACT. Baker was also a founder of the Queensland Academy of Sport.

== Sporting career ==
Baker's rugby league career began in Warwick, Queensland before he began playing for Brisbane club Easts in 1950, where he remained until 1960. During his time at the club, he scored 53 tries and kicked 13 goals during 175 first grade appearances.

During this time, he also played for Brisbane in the inter-city competition, the Bulimba Cup.

In 1959, his career peaked when he played in the lock position for Queensland against the touring New Zealand side, and against New South Wales.

Following his move to Townsville, Baker established the James Cook University Rugby League Football Club. Following his playing career, Baker spent time coaching. He coached North Queensland to win a state title against Brisbane in 1971.

== Personal life ==
Baker married Valerie Wormald in 1955. They had four children - Russell, Tracey, Rohan and Sharyn. At the time of his death, he had nine grandchildren.

== Honours ==
In 1982, Baker was appointed an Officer of the Order of the British Empire (OBE) for services to marine science.

In 1989 he was elected a Fellow of the Australian Academy of Technological Sciences and Engineering (FTSE).

He was awarded the Centenary Medal in 2001 for service to environmental research.

In 2001, Baker was named as a Queensland Great at the inaugural Queensland Greats Awards.

He was appointed an Officer of the Order of Australia (AO) in 2002 "for service to marine science, to the development of commercially viable and environmentally sustainable aquaculture industries, to environmental research and protection, and to the progress of ecologically sustainable development in Australia and internationally".

The sports science laboratory at the Queensland Academy of Sport was named in Baker's honour in 2010.

James Cook University honoured Baker in 2011 by naming its playing field at its Townsville campus Joe Baker Field.

== Death ==
After suffering from Parkinson's disease for some years, Baker died in Canberra on 16 January 2018 at the age of 85. His funeral was held in Canberra on 24 January 2018.

Baker's death prompted a number of public tributes.

In 2019 a reef in the Great Barrier Reef was named as Joe Baker Reef. Located beytween Olympic and Cockatoo Reefs, it is reef 20-374 at 20.800°S 151.157°E and is approximately 17Km x 12Km. It contains one of the few blue holes in the Great Barrier Reef.
