= Ottery Mine =

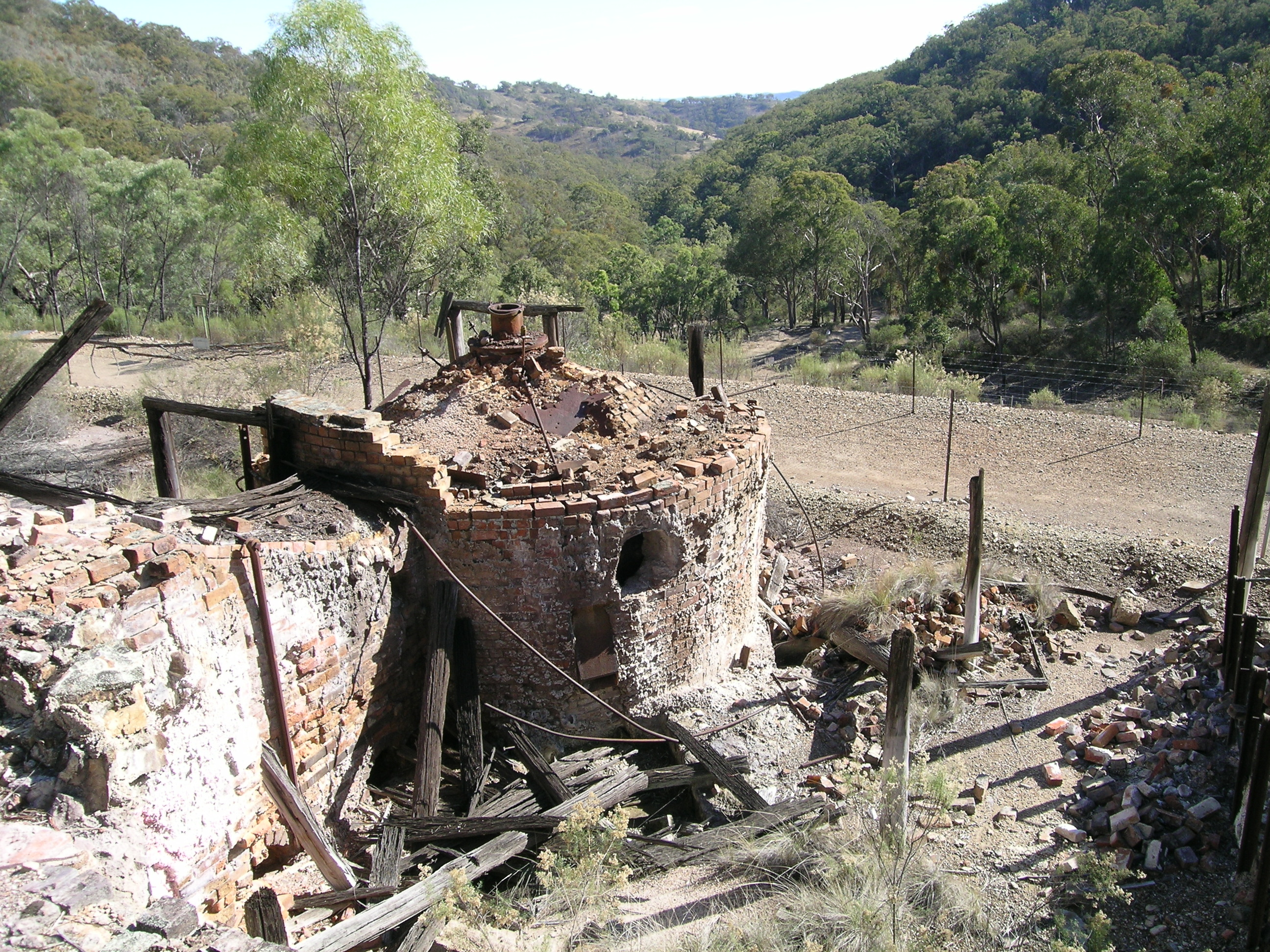

- Location within New South Wales Location within Australia
- 29.4089°S 151.6603°E
- Location: 8km north-east of Emmaville, Glen Innes Severn, New South Wales, Australia

History
- Built: 1882–1939

Site notes
- Owner: Department of Primary Industries

New South Wales Heritage Register
- Official name: Ottery Mine; The Ottery Mine; Industrial Archaeological Site
- Type: state heritage (archaeological-terrestrial)
- Designated: 2 April 1999
- Reference no.: 392
- Type: Mine site
- Category: Mining and Mineral Processing

== About ==
Ottery Mine (Ottery Arsenic and Tin Mine) is a heritage-listed former mine located 8 km north-east of Emmaville, Glen Innes Severn, New South Wales, Australia. It was built from 1882 to 1939. The property is owned by the New South Wales Department of Primary Industries. It was added to the New South Wales State Heritage Register on 2 April 1999.

== History ==
The Ottery Mine is a derelict underground tin/arsenic mine located 8 km northeast of Emmaville in far northern New South Wales. It was one of the first underground base metal deposits exploited in the Emmaville district and lies about 2.5 km north of the old mining village of Tent Hill.

The mine was discovered by and named after Alexander Ottery in the late 1870s. It was worked continuously for tin between 1882 and 1905 by the Glen Smelting Company who set up a 15 head stamper battery at near by Tent Hill. Extensive mine developments occurred with eight shafts being sunk and 2,500 tonnes of tin concentrate being produced. As the lode became deeper the sulphide content became higher, and a smelter was erected on site to calcine the ore. After it was fired the ore was transported to Tent Hill for crushing. After a fatal accident in 1906, operations ceased and did not begin again until 1920 when the mine was acquired by the Sydney based William Cooper and Nephews (Aust.) Pty. Ltd. Their sole purpose was to produce arsenic for sheep and cattle dips and other pesticides. An on site ore processing plant was constructed under the supervision of mine manager A. C. Julius and production of the 99.7% pure arsenic trioxide began in 1921.

The process of arsenic extraction involved feeding the coarse ore into roasting kilns and the fine ore into a mechanical furnace for firing. The resulting arsenic fumes passed into a set of 66 condensation chambers where the gasses were cooled and sublimed onto the interior brickwork as solid crystals of crude arsenic trioxide. The crystals were further refined by being re-fired and the gasses re-sublimed. The concentrated arsenic trioxide was then barrelled and transported to Sydney.

From 1925 to 1927 a ten-head stamper battery, grinding pans, concentrating tables, a concrete weir and pump were installed to extract the tin that was also present in the arsenic ores. The plant reworked arsenic tailings as well as some high tin, low arsenic ores. Operations ceased in late 1929 due to the economic depression and low mineral prices, only to reopen again in 1931. It operated in a limited capacity until 1936 when it was forced to close due to the importation of cheaper arsenic.

Burma Malay Tin Ltd. purchased the Ottery and commenced operations in June 1938. The company imported flotation equipment and constructed a freshwater dam for the storage of boiler feed and dressing water. No arsenic production occurred at this time. Prolonged dry weather forced the close of operations in 1940 and the company pulled down the plant buildings and equipment and transferred them to other sites.

From 1956-57 the Guardian Trading and Investment Company Pty. Ltd. reconditioned the mill and set up equipment to treat the remains of the old calcine dump. Further minor attempts were made to mine and treat the dumps but no further major mining operations were established.

In 1993 Ottery was rehabilitated in a joint project by the Department of Conservation and Land Management and the Department of Mineral Resources. This included: reducing the pollution of contaminated water/sediments in the area; improving fencing around the structures, many of which were unstable; fencing and covering open shafts and erecting walkways and viewing platforms.

As of February 2026, Tripadvisor's website includes a statement that "This place is temporarily closed due to remediation works. Works are scheduled to finish in March 2022, weather permitting.", a description of a visit in 2024 which states that "The closed signs are still up although you can still visit.", and an album of 24 photographs showing the mine in 2018 with signboards for visitors.

A review published in 2025 referred to "high-grade gold, silver and tin intercepts" at Ottery, now owned by Terra Uranium.

== Description ==
The total site covers some 20 hectares, although the PCO curtilage is confined to the area immediately surrounding the main buildings and works. The Ottery mine workings lie on the side of a steep hill at the head of a narrow gully. All drainage from the gully flows into a small, unnamed ephemeral creek. Numerous derelict structures, open mine workings, eroding slimes dams, spoil heaps and pieces of machinery are scattered across the site. These include the primary kilns, the secondary kilns, the rotary kiln, refinery, cooperage and two twin banks of condensers leading up the hill to a common flue and chimney. The chimney stack still in excellent condition, dominates the crest of the hill.

The burnt-out timber framework and concrete foundations of the tin processing plant can still be seen below the main shaft. Many bricks have been removed from every structure on the site except the chimney. The kilns are also relatively complete. The main shaft, which is open, has been built up with an extensive timber retaining wall and a large mullock dump on the down hill side. The mine workings extend up the gully to the southwest of the main shaft and numerous adits, small shafts, holes and collapsed stones are scattered throughout the bush. Several large circular open cuts, thought to be relics from the earliest tin producing days, occur towards the top of the hill. Two freshwater storage dams occur to the northeast and southwest of the mine workings.

Two large waste dumps block the drainage line below the arsenic chambers. A five-head stamper and engine stands nearby. Much of the area is covered with scrubby regrowth.

The gradient of the site falls steeply from south to north.

Most of the structures on the site are in ruins although stabilisation works have recently been undertaken. The archaeological potential of the site has been assessed as high.

=== Modifications and dates ===
- 1882 - smelter constructed
- 1920-22 - arsenic extraction plant constructed
- 1927 - tin extraction plant constructed, including a ten-head battery, dam and concentrating tables
- 1939 - flotation tanks and freshwater dam constructed
- 1940 - much equipment removed and structures dismantled
- 1993 - Ottery was rehabilitated in a joint project by the Department of Conservation and Land Management and the Department of Mineral Resources
- 2003 - Additional rehabilitation works due to continuing safety hazards and pollution problems on the site (signage, fencing, erosion and drainage control)

== Heritage listing ==
The Ottery Mine is the only arsenic refinery plant remaining in any condition in New South Wales. It is the oldest principal ore refinery in Australia. It was one of the first underground mines in the Emmaville area and largely responsible for the economic and social development of the town. The design of the Ottery arsenic plant is unique in Australia. It is the most complete and complex of the arsenic refinery sites. It is an excellent example of a traditional method of industrial processing.

The site has a unique potential to provide information about the mining and extraction of arsenic, for students of geology, archaeology and industrial process. No detailed plans of the site or individual structures are known to exist. The site can therefore provide information not available from any other source.

Ottery Mine was listed on the New South Wales State Heritage Register on 2 April 1999 having satisfied the following criteria.

The place is important in demonstrating the course, or pattern, of cultural or natural history in New South Wales.

The Ottery Mine is the only arsenic refinery plant remaining in any condition in New South Wales. It is the oldest principal ore refinery in Australia. Ore from the site was smelted at Australia's first tin smelter. It was one of the first underground mines in the Emmaville area and largely responsible for the economic and social development of the town.

The tin dressing plant represents the fluctuating fortunes of the tin mining industry.

The Ottery also has historical links to the wool industry, as arsenic was the principal ingredient in sheep dip.

With production commencing in 1882, the Ottery Mine is one of the oldest underground mines in the Emmaville District. Emmaville, Torrington and neighbouring towns developed from the mining industry. As such, the Ottery mine is an integral part of the history of the area. It represents the fluctuating fortunes of those who mined the Ottery tin lodes in the late nineteenth century and those who produced arsenic in the early twentieth century. Both tin and arsenic were extracted after 1927.

The Ottery arsenic refinery is the oldest principal ore refinery in Australia. Arsenic mining ceased in Australia in 1952 and in New South Wales in 1936, as the Ottery Mine ended production. As Godden suggests, it is unlikely that the mining of this resource will take place again, since the Bolidan copper mine in Sweden produces enough arsenic as a by-product to satisfy world demand.

The place has a strong or special association with a person, or group of persons, of importance of cultural or natural history of New South Wales's history.

The Ottery Mine is associated with Tent Hill, location of the first tin mine in Australia. The tin ore was concentrated initially and later smelted, at Tent Hill, the site of Australia's first tin smelter.

The place is important in demonstrating aesthetic characteristics and/or a high degree of creative or technical achievement in New South Wales.

The site is an integral part of the Emmaville mining landscape.

Substantial structural remains from the arsenic treatment plant and the intricately constructed brick checker-work condensation chambers, afford this site aesthetic and architectural significance. The Ottery arsenic treatment plant is particularly unique in Australia for its design, thought to be Portuguese.

The place has strong or special association with a particular community or cultural group in New South Wales for social, cultural or spiritual reasons.

Emmaville owes its existence to the discovery of alluvial and lode tin. Ottery, as one of the first and largest underground mining operations in the area, holds an important place for the local community in the history of their economic and social development.

The Ottery Mine is an integral part of Australia's mining history in the northern NSW region. It was once a major place of employment for many people, the descendants of whom still live in neighbouring towns. The Ottery Mine is also important to local organisations as a tourist site. Such groups include the Glen Innes Historical Society, the Gem and Mineral Club and Emmaville Tourism & Progress Association. While its relative isolation may limit the number of visitors, the site is actively promoted through literature, signage and community support.

The place has potential to yield information that will contribute to an understanding of the cultural or natural history of New South Wales.

The design of the Ottery arsenic plant is unique. It follows the traditional method of industrial processing.

The site has a unique potential to provide information about the mining and extraction of arsenic, for students of geology, archaeology and industrial process. No detailed plans of the site or individual structures are known to exist. The site can therefore provide information not available from any other source.

The place possesses uncommon, rare or endangered aspects of the cultural or natural history of New South Wales.

The Ottery arsenic refinery is the oldest principal ore refinery in Australia. Arsenic mining ceased in Australia in 1952 and in New South Wales in 1936, as the Ottery Mine ended production. As Godden suggests, it is unlikely that the mining of this resource will take place again, since the Bolidan copper mine in Sweden produces enough arsenic as a by-product to satisfy world demand.

The Ottery Mine is one of only four arsenic mines in Australia. These are the Ottery and Mole River mines in New South Wales and two mines in Queensland. Only the Ottery and Mole River mines were equipped with on-site refining plants capable of producing the final product.

The arsenic refinery is the best preserved of the sublimation type arsenic refineries. It is believed to be one of the last arsenic refinery relics of this type anywhere in the world. As such, it has international as well as national significance.
