= Cathryn Mittelheuser =

Australian botanist

Cathryn Jean Mittelheuser AM (born 1932) is a retired Australian botanist.

== Early life ==
Mittelheuser grew up with her older sister Margaret Mittelheuser on their parents' sugarcane farm near Bundaberg, Queensland. Graduating from Brisbane Girls Grammar School in 1949, Mittelheuser then studied at the University of Queensland in Brisbane, graduating with a Bachelor of Science and a University Medal in 1968.

Following her graduation, Mittelheuser completed a PhD in Biological Sciences in 1971 before working in the university's botany department where she was a senior research fellow from 1971 until 1976 and acting lecturer in third year cell physiology in 1975 and 1976. From 1971 until 1976, Mittelheuser was a postdoctoral researcher after being awarded a postdoctoral fellowship from the CSIRO.

== Career ==
Mittelheuser's work has been published in thirteen scientific books and journals, including a widely cited article about her discovery of a substance that assists plants retain water which was published in Nature in 1969. Despite being regarded as a pioneer in her field, she left research in 1976 after encountering sexism and becoming frustrated by less-qualified male researchers being considered for career progression ahead of her.

As a philanthropist, Mittelheuser has made considerable contributions to the University of Queensland, Griffith University, and Brisbane Girls Grammar School.

Known also for her involvement in the arts field, Mittelheuser has also made significant contributions to the Queensland Art Gallery and the University of Queensland Art Museum. She also served as chairperson of the Australian Decorative and Fine Arts Society.

Mittelheuser is also known for her involvement with the Lyceum Club where she served three consecutive terms as president from 1989 to 1992. She also served as vice-president of the International Association of Lyceum Clubs.

=== Recognition ===
In 1998, Mittelheuser received an honorary Doctor of Philosophy from the University of Queensland in honour of her contribution to the university and to the community.

For her service to women, especially with the Lyceum Club, Mittelheuser was made a Member of the Order of Australia in the 1999 Australia Day Honours. In 2001, Mittelheuser was awarded the Centenary Medal for distinguished service to both the Arts and the Lyceum Club.

From 18 July 2020 until 31 January 2021, the Queensland Art Gallery held an exhibition called "Two sisters: A singular vision" showcasing over 100 works that the Mittelheuser sisters had acquired for the gallery over a 35 year period, particularly works by female Indigenous Australian artists.

Mittelheuser is also the benefactor behind the Mittelheuser Scholar-in-Residence at the State Library of Queensland, a research project which aims to advance the knowledge of professionals in the gallery, library, art and museum fields by awarding a $15,000 bursary each year to a successful applicant.

In 2021, Mittelheuser and her sister were named as Queensland Greats.
