= Pearl Duncan =

Australian teacher and anthropologist (1933–2022)

- Born: Pearl Maud Duncan; 27 April 1933; Emmaville, New South Wales
- Died: 19 July 2022 (aged 89)
- Occupations: Teacher, anthropologist, academic

Pearl Maud Duncan Booth (27 April 1933 – 19 July 2022) was an Australian teacher, anthropologist and academic. A Gamilaraay woman, she was the first known tertiary-qualified Indigenous teacher in Australia. She was named a Queensland Great in 2008.

== Early and personal life ==
Duncan, a Gamilaraay woman, was born on 27 April 1933 in Emmaville, New South Wales, where she spent her childhood as a member of the only Aboriginal family in the town. After graduating secondary school, she left for Sydney to study further.

She was married for approximately 30 years.

== Career ==
In Sydney, Duncan gained tertiary teaching qualifications—the first known Aboriginal Australian to do so—before moving to Yarrabah in North Queensland where she taught for two years. During her time in Yarrabah, she starred in the 1953 documentary Children of the Wasteland, a film about Indigenous life in the area that was a source of controversy amongst censors. She continued her teaching career elsewhere, including in the Torres Strait and New Zealand, and in 1977 was appointed to the National Aboriginal Education Committee. She also worked as Head of the Aboriginal and Torres Strait Islander Unit at the Queensland University of Technology, and in senior roles in the public service.

She held a Bachelor of Letters in anthropology from the Australian National University and a master's degree in education from the University of Canberra. She completed her thesis on Aboriginal humour and was awarded a PhD from the University of Queensland in 2014.

== Honours ==
She received a Centenary Medal "[i]n recognition of community service through Indigenous education" on New Year's Day 2001, before being Queensland's nominee for Senior Australian of the Year in 2004.

Later, in 2008, she was named a Queensland Great, an honour which "recognises the efforts and achievements of remarkable individuals... for their invaluable contribution to the history and development of [the] state".

== Death and legacy ==
Duncan died on 19 July 2022 at the age of 89. In a tribute following her death, Queensland Minister of Education Grace Grace labelled her a "trailblazer in education" and a "true Queensland great".

Each year, the Queensland Department of Education awards multiple Pearl Duncan Teaching Scholarships to Aboriginal and Torres Strait Islander people seeking to study education, named in honour of Duncan "dedicat[ing] her life to improving not only the outcomes of Aboriginal and Torres Strait Islanders but to ensuring a firm foundation for the Aboriginal and Torres Strait Islander achievers of tomorrow".
