= Eddie Liu =

Australian community leader

James Edward "Eddie" Liu OBE OAM (25 May 1922 – 25 June 2013) was an Australian community leader. best known for his work with the Chinese Australian community in Brisbane, Queensland.

Among his most notable achievements are co-founding the Chinese Club of Queensland in 1952 and establishing Brisbane's Chinatown in the 1980s.

== Biography ==
Born in Hong Kong in 1922, Liu grew up in Kowloon and attended La Salle College.

He moved to Australia in 1937 to complete his secondary education at Christian Brothers College in Melbourne.

He was sent to Brisbane in 1942 during World War II when he was called on to supervise and translate for Chinese seamen who were tasked with building landing barges, work which led to him being appointed secretary of the Chinese Seamen's Union of Australia.

== Leadership ==
During his time in Brisbane, Liu was seen as a leader within the city's multicultural community, helping settle migrants from Singapore, Thailand, Solomon Islands and China. Liu is often referred to as the founding father of Chinatown in Brisbane's Fortitude Valley, having been appointed to a committee to establish the community in 1983. Upon its opening in 1987, Liu was appointed an honorary ambassador of Brisbane.

As an advocate of preservation of Chinese culture, Liu is credited with overseeing the restoration of Brisbane's first Chinese temple, Holy Triad Temple at Breakfast Creek in the 1960s, which had been built in 1886 by the Cantonese Chinese community of Brisbane. He also supported numerous charities and promoted or participated in various community initiatives.

Liu was a critic of politician Pauline Hanson and her right-wing populist political party One Nation. He once described Hanson as having no sense of humour following a discussion with her during a chance encounter on a flight from Brisbane to Canberra, where Liu suggested she marry a Chinese person to get a better understanding of immigration issues.

== Honours ==
Liu received numerous honours during his life, including the Order of the British Empire in 1980 and the Order of Australia Medal in 2001.

He also received the Centenary Medal in 2001, and was the Metropolitan Local Hero for Queensland at the 2004 Australian of the Year Awards.

The University of Queensland presented an honorary doctorate to Liu in 2007. He was named as a Queensland Great in 2010.

Eddie Liu died on 25 June 2013. His death prompted a number of public tributes from community and political leaders. His funeral was held at Brisbane City Hall on 11 July 2013. At the time of his death, Liu had six children, 13 grandchildren and 14 great-grandchildren. His wife Elizabeth, whom he had married in 1940, predeceased him when she died in 2001 at the age of 79.
