= Margaret Mittelheuser =

Australian stockbroker

Margaret Helen Mittelheuser AM (1931—2013) was an Australian stockbroker. She was the first female stockbroker in Australia and one of the first female stockbrokers in the world. Margaret joined Ralph W. King and Yuill stockbrokers in July 1964. On Queensland Day in 2021, Mittelheuser was named jointly with her sister Cathryn Mittelheuser as one of Queensland Greats by the Queensland Government.

== Biography ==
Margaret Mittelheuser was born on 25 July 1931 in Bundaberg, Queensland. Her family moved to Brisbane where she won a place at The University of Queensland when she was only 16, graduating with a Bachelor of Commerce in 1952 and a Bachelor of Arts in 1973. She commenced work at the Commonwealth Department of the Interior after graduation in 1952, before moving to Sydney where she joined the stockbroking firm of Ralph W. King and Yuill. She received an honorary Doctor of Philosophy from the university in 1996 for her contribution to stockbroking, education and the university. She was the founding patron of the literary journal Griffith Review.

== Awards ==
Mittleheuser was made a Member of the Order of Australia (AM) in the 1996 Queen's Birthday Honours for "service to the financial industry as an investment advisor and to the stockbroking industry and to the community through cultural and educational organisations". She was awarded a Centenary Medal from the University of Queensland.

In 2017, Mittelheuser was inducted into the Queensland Business Leaders Hall of Fame. She is best known for being a gifted analyst and Australia's first female stockbroker and her contributions to State and local government infrastructure developments.

In 2021, Mittelheuser and her sister, former plant scientist Cathryn Mittelheuser, were jointly named as Queensland Greats.

== Legacy ==
A bronze bust of Mittelhauser was commissioned the University of Queensland's Faculty of Business, Economics and Law in partnership with UQ Art Museum in 2018. It was created by Sydney-based sculptor Wendy Black. It resides in the courtyard of the University's Colin Clark building, to recognise her significance to the finance, business and economics discipline. The Dr Margaret Mittelheuser AM and Morgans Prize in MBA Accounting and Finance was established in 2006.

The State Library of Queensland's 'Mittelheuser Scholar in Residence' program aims to attract leading thinkers who will develop new ideas, tools, strategies or services that benefit both Queensland’s GLAM (galleries, libraries, archives and museums) sector and State Library of Queensland.
