= Queensland Greats Awards =

Award for Queenslanders in Australia

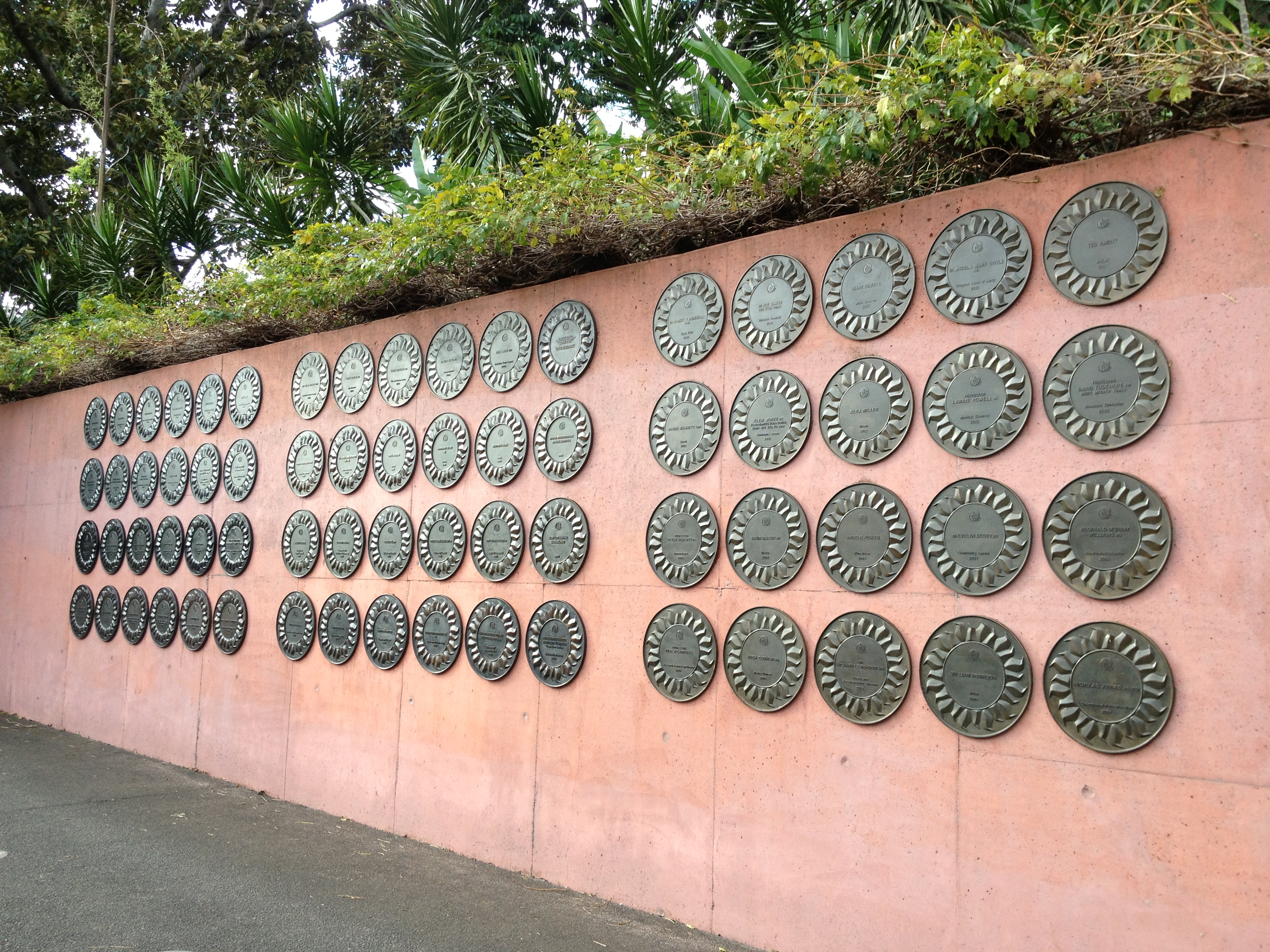
Queensland Greats Awards plaques at Roma Street Parkland

The Queensland Greats Awards recognise outstanding Queenslanders for their years of dedication and contribution to the development of the state and their role in strengthening and shaping the community in Queensland, Australia. The awards are presented as part of the Queensland Day celebrations. Each award is commemorated with a plaque on a wall in the Roma Street Parkland.

== History ==
The awards commenced in 2001. An institution has been awarded annually since 2006. A posthumous award was added in 2015.

== Award recipients ==
Year	Individuals	Institution	Posthumous
2025	Jeffrey Dunn AO; David Elliott OAM; James Frizelle; Mark Kendall; Sarina Russo AM	The Lady Musgrave Trust	Sir Frank Moore AO
2024	Peter Andrews AO; Natalie Cook OAM; Keri Craig-Lee OAM; Scott Hutchinson; Getano Lui (Jnr) AM	LifeFlight	Sir Bruce Small
2023	William Barton; Joe Brumm; Gerald (Tony) Fitzgerald AC KC; Steve Renouf; Adele Rice AM	Queensland Rural Fire Service	Dr Honor Dell Cleary OAM; Alan Mackay-Sim AM
2022	Uncle Albert Holt; Usman Khawaja; Dr Stuart Pegg AM; Else Shepherd AM; Gracelyn Smallwood AM; Peter Timms	Queensland Museum	Mirdidingkingathi Juwarnda Sally Gabori
2021	Isobel (Pixie) Annat MBE OAM; Dr Margaret Mittelheuser AM; Dr Cathryn Mittelheuser AM; Ajay Rane OAM; Aunty Ivy Trevallion; Karyn Walsh AM	QIMR Berghofer	Sister Regis Mary Dunne AO RSM
2020	Nancy Bates OAM; Angus Lane OAM; Mick Lowcock; Bruce Morcombe OAM; Denise Morcombe OAM; James Morton, AM; Betty Taylor	Police Citizens Youth Club Queensland	Darby McCarthy OAM
2019	Robert (Bob) Aktkinson, AO, APM; Judith Clements, AC; Mark Loane, AM; Kay McGrath, OAM; Patricia O'Connor; Charles (Chuck) Feeney (honorary)	Queensland Country Women's Association	John Sinclair, AO
2018	William Hauritz, AM; Gail Ker, OAM; Henrietta Marrie, AM; David Nilsson; Matthew Sanders	St Vincent de Paul Society Queensland	Butch Lenton
2017	Perry Bartlett; Clive Berghofer, AM; Peter Coaldrake, AO; Phil Dickie; Cindy Shannon	Queensland Symphony Orchestra; Local Government Association of Queensland	Eddie Mabo
2016	Allan Border, AO; The Hon. Dame Quentin Bryce, AD, CVO; John Curro, AM, MBE; Lloyd McDermott; Mal Meninga, AM	RSPCA Queensland	George Roberts
2015	Andrew Brice, AM; James Dale, AO; Pat Fennell; Jack Gleeson, AM; Robert MacPherson	RSL (Queensland Branch)	Steve Irwin
2014	Sallyanne Atkinson, AO; Fred Conway; Patrick Corrigan, AM; Adèle Green, AC; Win Schubert, AO	Endeavour Foundation	
2013	Stefan Ackerie; Dimity Dornan, AO; Tim Fairfax, AC; G.Q. Max Lu, AO; Herb Wharton	Australian Red Cross Society	
2012	Ken Donald, AO; Deborah Mailman; Daphne Pirie, AO, MBE; Sir Sydney Schubert; Terry White, AO	Queensland Meals on Wheels	
2011	Betty Byrne Henderson, AO; George Chapman, AO; Graham Jackson, OAM; Wally Lewis, AM; Kerry O'Brien	Queensland State Emergency Service	
2010	The Hon. Mike Ahern, AO; The Hon. Sir Llewellyn Edwards, AC; Michael Good, AO; Ruth Hegarty; Eddie Liu, OBE, OAM	The University of Queensland (UQ)	
2009	Philip Bacon, AM; Bill Bristow, AM; Kev Carmody; Robyn Rodwell; Anthony Ryan	Blue Care	
2008	Ian Brusasco, AO; Pearl Duncan; Matthew Hayden, AM; Ross Homel, AO; Thancoupie, AO	Royal Flying Doctor Service of Australia (Queensland section)	
2007	Ashley Cooper, AO; The Hon. Leneen Forde, AC; Doug Hall, AM; John Hay, AC; Sir Leo Hielscher, AC	Surf Life Saving Queensland	
2006	Ian Frazer, AC; Jim Kennedy, AO, CBE; Greg Norman, AO; Margaret Olley, AC; Geoffrey Rush, AC	Mater Misericordiae Health Service	
2005	Bill Brown, OAM; Tony Gould, AM; Terry Jackman, AM; Aila Keto, AO; Rod Laver, MBE		
2004	Julie H. Campbell, AO; Hugh Cornish, AM; Richard Lewandowski; William Robinson, AO; Nick Xynias, AO, BEM		
2003	Peter Doherty, AC; David Malouf, AO; Angelo Puglisi; Evelyn Scott, AO; R. M. Williams, AO, CMG		
2002	Wayne Bennett, AM; Clem Jones, AO; Olga Miller; Lawrie Powell, AC; David Tudehope, AM		
2001	Robert "Uncle Bob" Anderson, OAM; Joe Baker, AO, OBE; Diane Cilento; Angela Mary Doyle, AO; Ted Smout, OAM		
