= Angelo Puglisi =

Australian winemaker

Angelo Puglisi is an Australian winemaker, best known for owning and managing the Ballandean Estate on Queensland's Granite Belt with his family.

In 1977, Puglisi was awarded a Churchill Fellowship to study overseas growing and management techniques associated with the winemaking industry.

Puglisi was awarded the Centenary Medal in 2001 and was named as a Queensland Great in 2003. He was also named as an Australia Day Ambassador in late 2013.
