= Ivy Trevallion =

Torres Strait Islander social worker

Ivy Trevallion is a Torres Strait Islander social worker and community leader.

Trevallion, often referred to as "Aunty Ivy", is credited with helping pass the Meriba Omasker Kaziw Kazipa (Torres Strait Islander Traditional Child Rearing Practice) Act 2020 through the Queensland Parliament in 2020. It is the first bill in Australian history to legally recognise a traditional custom, namely an ancient child-rearing practice among Torres Strait Islander people where a child is adopted by a relative or community member.

Along with Alastair Nicholson and Charles Passi, Trevallion was one of three eminent persons engaged to provide legal, cultural and gender expertise at culturally sensitive consultations prior to the passing of the bill on 16 July 2020.

Her career as a social worker commenced in the 1970s when she enrolled in the Aboriginal Task Force, completing a Community Development Certificate in 1977 and an Associate Diploma in Social Work in 1978.

In 1986, Trevallion was one of the first Torres Strait Islander social workers to graduate from the University of Queensland.

During her career, Trevallion has worked as a social worker, resource officer and coordinate at various organisations and government departments. These include Aboriginal and Torres Strait Islander Medical Services, Queensland University of Technology Student Support Services, the Department of Communities, the Office of Aboriginal and Torres Strait Islander Policy, Torres and Cape Hospital and Health Services and the Social and Emotional Wellbeing Counselling Service. She has served on numerous boards and committees including the National Aboriginal and Torres Strait Islander Women's Alliance.

In February 2020, Trevallion was appointed as president of the Torres Strait Islander Media Association.

However, it was her advocacy and lobbying for the legal recognition of the traditional child-rearing practices of the Torres Strait as a member and president of the Kupai Omasker Working Party for which she is best known.

In 2021, Trevallion was named as a Queensland Great.
