= Nick Xynias =

Nicholas Xynias AO BEM (20 March 1933 – 25 January 2015) was an Egyptian-born Greek Australian multiculturalism advocate.

He was known for his many years of work with various community organisations attempting to improve the lives of Australians from various ethnic backgrounds, particularly in his roles with the Ethnic Communities Council of Queensland, an organisation which he helped establish in 1976.

== Career ==
Born in 1933, Xynias was the third son of Rigas and Kyriakoula Xynias who had emigrated from the Greek island of Lemnos to Egypt. He grew up in Ismailia in north-eastern Egypt. After working as a mechanical engineer for the British Army, Xynias travelled to Australia in 1956 and settled in Queensland.

Xynias began his community involvement in Australia by volunteering as a scout leader at Brisbane's Greek Orthodox Church of St. George where he established the Hellenic Scout Group.

Xynias' community roles then extended to becoming a member of the Greek Ethnic Schools Association and the Society of Greeks from Egypt and the Middle East before he joined the Australian Hellenic Educational Progressive Association in 1964.

His other roles in the community included serving on the Commonwealth Migrant Consulting Council, the Queensland Aboriginal Council, the Queensland Multicultural Coordinating Committee, the Department of Ethnic Affairs' Ministerial Advisory Committee and the Migrant Consultative Council for the Departments of Social Security and Education.

Throughout the 1980s, Xynias fought to establish a multicultural nursing home, and in August 1988 the Ethnic Communities Council of Queensland purchased the Berlasco Court Nursing Centre in Indooroopilly and used it to realise Xynias' vision of providing culturally inclusive care for older people from various ethnic backgrounds. In 1989, Xynias established the Community Options Program so older people from diverse ethnic backgrounds could receive assistance in their homes. The organisation was renamed Diversicare in 2000.

Xynias was a founding member of Regional Development Australia and its forerunner, the Greater Brisbane Area Consultative Committee from 2000 until 2009 when he served as the organisation's deputy chairperson.

Prior to his death in 2015, Xynias had been appointed to the Queensland advisory committee for the commemoration of the Anzac Centenary.

== Honours ==
In 1982, Xynias was awarded the British Empire Medal for services to the ethnic community.

He received the Medal of the Order of Australia in 1994 for service to the community through his role with the Ethnic Communities Council of Queensland and for the provision of support to migrants.

Xynias was made an Officer of the Order of Australia in 2001.

He was named as a Queensland Great in 2004.

In 2008, he was named as Brisbane's Citizen of the Year.

Following his death, the Ethnic Communities Council of Queensland's headquarters in West End was renamed as Nick Xynias House in Xynias' honour.

== Death ==
Nicholas Xynias died at the age of 82 on 25 January 2015 after a brief illness. His funeral was held at the Greek Orthodox Church of St. George in Brisbane on 3 February 2015.

More than 1200 people attended his funeral including Queensland Premier Campbell Newman, Queensland Opposition Leader Annastacia Palaszczuk, Brisbane mayor Graham Quirk and Queensland's Consul-General for Greece, Jim Raptis.
