= Ruth Hegarty =

Indigenous Australian writer

Ruth Hegarty nee Duncan (born 1929, in Mitchell, Queensland) is an Aboriginal Elder and author.

Hegarty is well known for her non-fiction novels that document her personal history as one of the Stolen Generations. Her first book, Is That You, Ruthie? (3/11/2003), is based on her experiences in the Cherbourg Aboriginal Mission where she lived until the age of 14. Her second novel, Bittersweet Journey is the story of her early married life, her dealings with the Native Affairs Department, and her work in community politics and Indigenous organisations.

Is That You, Ruthie? won the David Unaipon Award for Unpublished Indigenous Writer at the 1998 Queensland Premier's Literary Awards. A 2023 play by Leah Purcell is based on the book.

In 2010, Hegarty was a recipient of a prize at the Queensland Greats Awards.

== Life ==
Hegarty and her mother, Ruby, were initially housed together in the dormitories at the Cherbourg Aboriginal Mission. When Hegarty was four years old, they were separated, when Ruby was sent away to work. They only had intermittent contact from that time onwards.

At the settlement, Hegarty formed strong friendships with the other girls in the dormitories. They were constantly supervised, punished and whipped for minor misdemeanours. The girls in the dormitory stayed together for support and for protection. There was no natural justice, just strict discipline and punishment. She states:

We got whipped from babyhood - there was no age, you just got it. And this is what we got whipped with [cat o'nine tails]. It was used in the prison at the time, and they were using it on us as children.

It isn't any different from a prison - it is exactly like it, except that we weren't inmates; we were children, and we'd done nothing wrong, absolutely nothing wrong at all.

In 1943, Hegarty was sent away from the Cherbourg settlement to work as a domestic servant. Travelling to her new job, at the age of 14, she travelled alone for the first time in her life. She did not know the people she was travelling to work for and she felt very isolated and vulnerable.

In the 1960s, after accessing her records from Cherbourg, when she found that many of the letters she had written to her friends at the mission had not been delivered, Hegarty organised a reunion of the girls she grew up with at Cherbourg.

Ruth married Joe Hegarty, whom she had known since childhood, and has a family of eight children.

For more than 30 years, Hegarty has volunteered on community projects in the areas of youth and aged services. In 1998, she was awarded the Premier's Award for Queensland Seniors Year for her services to the community. She is a founding member of Koobara Aboriginal and Torres Strait Islander Family Resource Centre.

In the 2007 Senate enquiry in Stolen Wages, Hegarty was a member of the Queensland Stolen Wages Working Group.

== Awards ==
- 1998 Queensland Premier's Literary Awards
- 2010, Queensland Greats Awards

== Bibliography ==
- Is That You Ruthie? (UQP, 1999; 2003) ISBN 0-7022-3415-X ReviewReview
- Bittersweet journey. (UQP, 2003) ISBN 0-7022-3414-1 Review
