= Olga Miller =

Australian historian and Aboriginal elder

- Born: Olga Eunice Wondunna; 27 March 1920; Maryborough, Queensland
- Died: August 2003 (aged 83); Maryborough, Queensland
- Occupations: Historian, artist, author and Aboriginal elder

Olga Eunice Miller (née Wondunna, later Reeves; 27 March 1920 – August 2003), often known as Aunty (or Auntie) Olga or by her traditional name Wandi, was an Australian historian, artist, author and Aboriginal elder of the Butchulla people. She often acted as an advocate for K'gari (Fraser Island) and Butchulla issues, and illustrated The Legends of Moonie Jarl, the first known Australian Aboriginal–written children's book to be published. In 2002 she was named a Queensland Great.

== Early and personal life ==
The youngest of seven siblings, Miller was born Olga Eunice Wondunna on 27 March 1920 in Maryborough, Queensland to mother Ethel Marion Reeves (née Gribble) and father Frederick Wondunna. Her parents' relationship, that of an Indigenous man and a white woman, was deeply controversial in its time and opposed by Ethel's brother Ernest Gribble in particular.

Olga changed her surname from Wondunna to Reeves, before marrying Ronald Richard Miller on 1 June 1940 and taking his name.

She was a member of the Butchulla people, of whom her paternal grandfather Willie Wondunna was an important leader and her son Glen is now an elder. Her maternal grandfather, meanwhile, was 19th-century English-born missionary J. B. Gribble, well known for his work with Indigenous Australians.

Her grandniece Fiona Foley is an artist and founding member of the Boomalli Aboriginal Artists Cooperative.

== Career ==
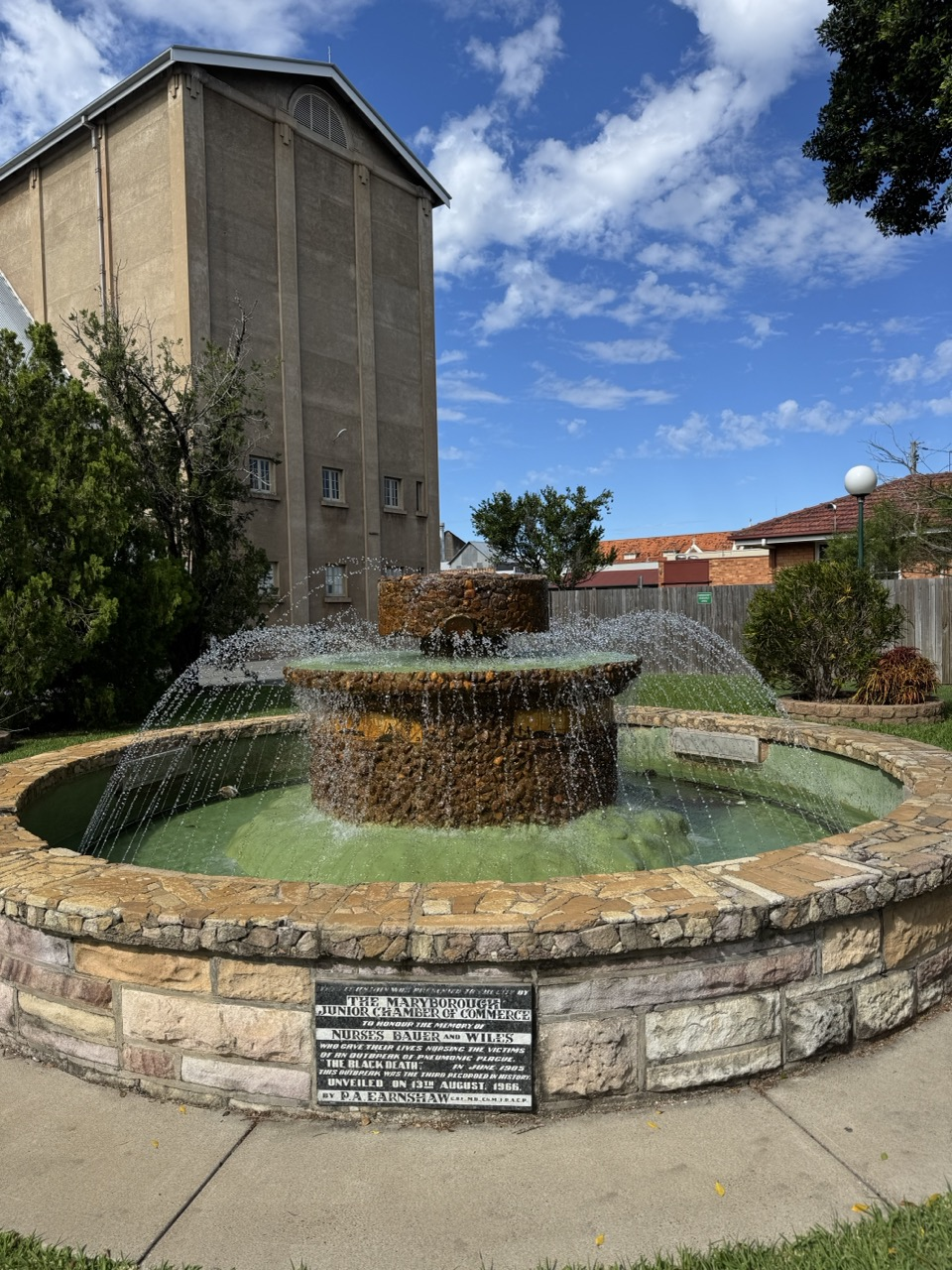
The fountain at Maryborough City Hall is dedicated to Cecelia Bauer and Rose Adelaide Wiles. It features artwork by Olga Miller.

Miller worked in various media, writing for school textbooks, animated films and newspapers; presenting on radio; and illustrating children's stories. In 1964, she illustrated The Legends of Moonie Jarl, written by her brother Wilf Reeves, which is the first known published children's book authored by an Aboriginal Australian. She illustrated it under her traditional Butchulla name, Wandi, which means "wild duck".

Beside Maryborough City Hall there is a fountain that features her artwork. It was built in 1966 and is dedicated to two nurses who died whilst caring for victims of the 1905 outbreak of pneumonic plague in Maryborough.

Outside of her media work, she was an activist for K'gari (Fraser Island) issues, often consulted by developers when they wished to build there. Describing her advocacy, Miller said she "[made] a nuisance of [herself]", but that she was "not interested in money… just [looking] after the land".

She was the Caboonya (keeper of records) of the Butchulla people, a role given to her by her grandfather. Well-versed in Aboriginal knowledge and a respected historian, she acted as a consultant on Indigenous issues and history throughout her life. According to the Queensland Government, she "spent her time educating non-Indigenous Australians about pre-European history and Aboriginals on their own cultural background".

== Honours ==
Miller received a Centenary Medal for "services to reconciliation and the preservation of Aboriginal history" on New Year's Day 2001, and in 2002 was named a Queensland Great, an honour which "recognises the efforts and achievements of remarkable individuals... for their invaluable contribution to the history and development of [the] state".

In April 2003, she was awarded an honorary fellowship by the University of Southern Queensland (USQ), on whose Fraser Coast campus she had helped establish Buallum Jarl-Bah, a centre for Indigenous learning.

== Death and legacy ==
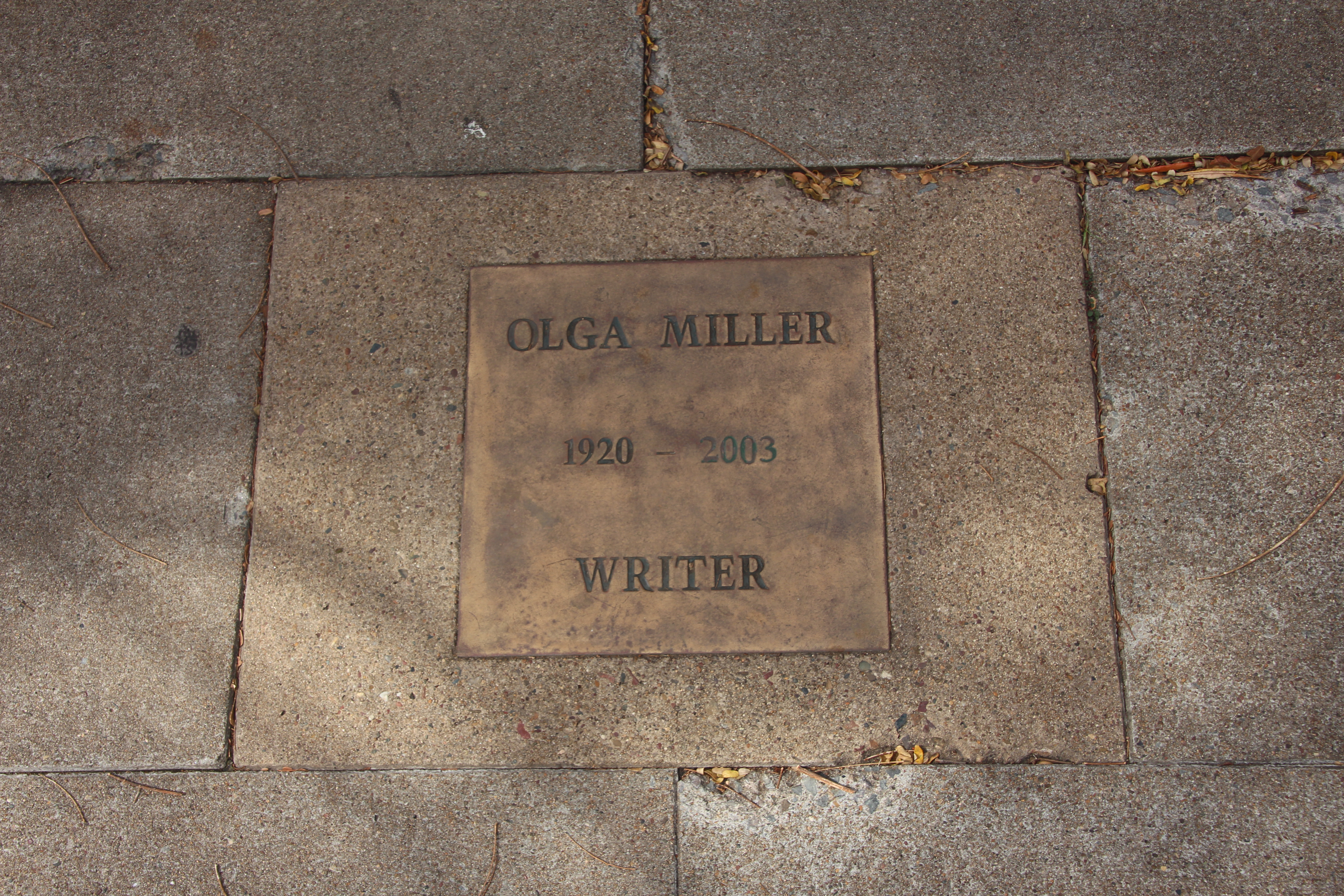
A plaque dedicated to Miller in Maryborough

Miller died in August 2003 in Maryborough. Her death was acknowledged by member for Maryborough Chris Foley on the floor of Queensland parliament.

USQ dedicated a garden on its Fraser Coast campus to her in December 2009, the Olga Miller Memorial Garden. Both the garden and Buallum Jarl-Bah have remained since the campus' transfer to the University of the Sunshine Coast.

== Bibliography ==
- The Legends of Moonie Jarl: 1964 (illustrated; written by Wilf Reeves)
- Fraser Island Legends: 1993
- Strings and Things from Long Ago: 1999
- The Legend of Mount Bauple: 2000
- Wook-Koo: 2001
- Buallum and Other Stories: 2002
