= Sue Packer =

Australian paediatrician and advocate (born 1942)

Suzanne Mary Packer AO (born circa 1942) is an Australian paediatrician and advocate for the rights of children. She was granted Officer of the Order of Australia in 2021 for "distinguished service to children through roles in health, welfare and protection initiatives" and previously a member of the Order of Australia in 1999 for "services to child welfare, paediatrics and the public". As of 2021 she is a clinical senior lecturer at ANU Medical School, Australian National University.

== Education and career ==
Packer grew up in the Blue Mountains and attended Sydney University for her undergraduate degree. She then continued to do practical training in obstetrics and paediatrics at St Vincent’s Hospital. In 1972 she qualified as a specialist paediatrician and has worked as a community paediatrician with a special interest in child abuse and abuse prevention since 1990.

== Awards ==
- Officer of the Order of Australia – Queen's Birthday honours, 2021
- ACT Senior Australian of the Year, 2019
- Canberra Citizen of the Year, 2013
- Children's Week special award, 2005
- Member of the Order of Australia – Australia Day honours, 1999
