= Harold Burnell Carter =

Australian scientist (1910–2005)

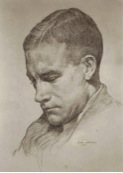
- Portrait of Carter as a young man c. 1930
- Born: 3 January 1910; Mosman, New South Wales, Australia
- Died: 27 February 2005 (aged 95); Somerset, England
- Occupation: Veterinary scientist (sheep)
- Known for: Scientific study of the merino wool follicle, scientific history of the Merino, the life and work of Sir Joseph Banks
- Spouse: Mary (née Brandon Jones)
- Children: 3, including Brandon Carter

Academic background
- Education: School of Veterinary Science, University of Sydney

Harold Burnell Carter, BVSc, DVSc (Hon), FRSE, AM; (3 January 1910 – 27 February 2005) was an Australian scientist whose work in the middle decades of the twentieth century at the CSIR (now CSIRO) – Australia's national scientific research organization – laid foundations for the scientific understanding of the biology of Merino fine wool – upon which much of Australia's economy depended at the time. As an author, he has been collected by libraries.

== Research ==
Carter's investigations were focussed upon the histology of the wool fibre, its embryonic development and the genetic and environmental factors that caused variability in wool quality. His aim was to establish the necessary scientific knowledge by which the economic value of the Merino could be improved. He was a strong supporter of women's participation in this research. Burnell conceived the idea of an Australian national Sheep and Wool laboratory. In the early 1940s, he drafted a plan for such laboratories, which he developed in discussion with his senior colleagues Lionel B. Bull and Ian Clunies Ross. In 1945, as part of Australia's post War economic development plan, an Act of the Australian Parliament was passed for their construction (Wool Uses Promotion Act, 1945). The laboratories, built at Prospect Hill near Sydney under Carter's supervision, were opened in 1953 as the "Sheep Biology Laboratory" of the CSIRO (renamed the "Ian Clunies Ross Animal Research Laboratory" in 1959 following the death of Clunies Ross, the Director of CSIRO).

Following completion of the Sheep Biology Laboratory, Carter resigned from the CSIRO and took a position at the Animal Breeding Research Organisation in Edinburgh, Scotland.

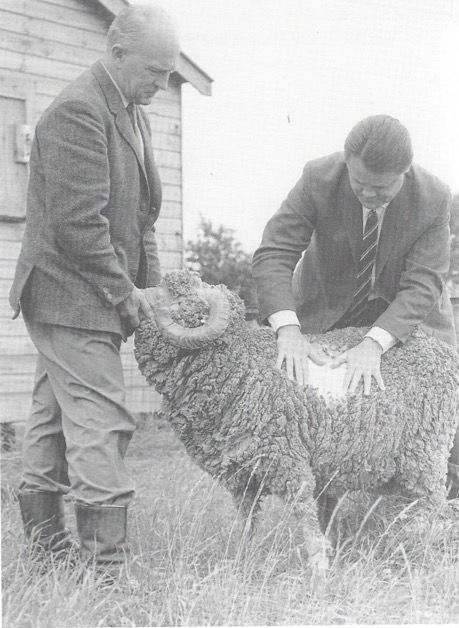
HB Carter helping D Knight with a Merino sheep c. 1965 near Leeds, United Kingdom

In the later decades of his life he devoted himself increasingly to primary historical scientific research on the origins of the Merino as a producer of fine wool. This work culminated in a major biography of Sir Joseph Banks, a founder of Australia's Merino fine wool economy.

== Honours ==
- Fellow of the Royal Society of Edinburgh (1960)
- Honorary Degree of Doctor of Veterinary Science, University of Sydney (1996)
- Member of the Order of Australia (1999)

== Major publications ==
- H.B. Carter "The Development and General Histology of the Follicle Group in the skin of the Merino" C.S.I.R. (Australia) Bulletin No. 164, 1-21, 1943
- H.B. Carter "His Majesty’s Spanish Flock" Angus & Robertson Ltd, 1964
- H.B. Carter "Sir Joseph Banks, 1743-1820" British Museum (Natural History), 1988

== Bibliography ==
- R. Carter "A review of the life, work and influences of Harold Burnell Carter, August 2013" Files of the Royal Society of Edinburgh
- H.B. Carter "Notes on the Development of Sheep and Wool Research in Australia 1934-1954" Files of the Royal Society of Edinburgh
- Brad Collis "Fields of Discovery: Australia’s CSIRO" (CSIRO Publishing) 2002
- Charles Massy "The Australian Merino" (Random House) 2007
- "Wool Uses Promotion Act" Parliament of the Commonwealth of Australia, 1945
- Marjory Collar O’Dea "Ian Clunies Ross a biography" (Hyland House, Melbourne) 1997
