= Valerie Browning =

Australian nurse and overseas aid volunteer

Valerie Browning AM (born 1950) is an Australian nurse who is known for her work with Afar people in Ethiopia. She founded the Afar Pastoral Development Association and the Barbara May Hospital.

== Background ==
Browning was born in southern England but raised in an Anglican family in Armidale, New South Wales where her father, a former British Army officer, was a horticulturalist and her mother a nurse with 8 children. In the 1960s she was sent by her parents to nursing school in Sydney at the age of 16 or 17, because her large family struggled financially. She was later enlisted on graduation from Royal Alexandra Hospital and midwifery training by a fellow nurse Rowene Brooker, on a scheme for medical personnel to support victims of the 1973 Ethiopian famine. The two knew nothing of Ethiopia or African life, and left Australian ten days later and travelled straight from Addis Ababa to the East African Rift and down into the Danakil Desert, nomadic Afar country, caring for malnourished and sick people.

Outraged by the suffering she witnessed, she continued working in and fundraising for the region, notably in Ethiopia, Somalia, Djibouti and Eritrea, and she has also worked in Sudanese refugee camps. In those years, she financed her trips by working part-time in Sydney, at the Royal Women's Hospital in Melbourne, and in Saudi Arabia. At various times she was declared persona non-grata in Ethiopia and Djibouti for reporting on human rights abuses.

She settled full-time in northern Ethiopia with Afar people following her marriage in 1989, and after more than 35 years in the region and the town of Logia is still helping Afar with basic needs of life such as safe child birth and healthcare based from the Barbara May Hospital, which receives international funding. Her Association has aided access to education and healthcare, including childhood vaccination programs, even in very most remote areas. Her work has carried on despite the Ethiopian Civil War and the more recent Tigray War, and various other conflicts affecting Tigray, Amhara, and the surrounding region which have negatively affected local people.

== Recognition ==
In 1999, she was appointed a Member of the Order of Australia for service to international humanitarian aid.

She won Rotary International's The One Award in 2012.

== Personal ==
Browning married an elder of an Afar clan, Ismael Ali Gardo, in 1989, having first met in 1986. Their daughter Aisha was born in 1991, and works as a nurse in Sydney. She has two adopted sons, Rammid (2002) and Nabil (2014), both of whom live in Ethiopia. She is a practicing Christian, but is opposed to much Christian missionary activity in Africa.

Her nephew is Dr Andrew Browning AM, obstetrician and gynaecologist, who conducts obstetric fistula operations and is based in Amhara, Ethiopia.

== Book ==
Her book, Maalika, My life among the Afar nomads of Africa was published in 2009, becoming a bestseller in Australia.
