= Emmaville, New South Wales =

Emmaville
- Town
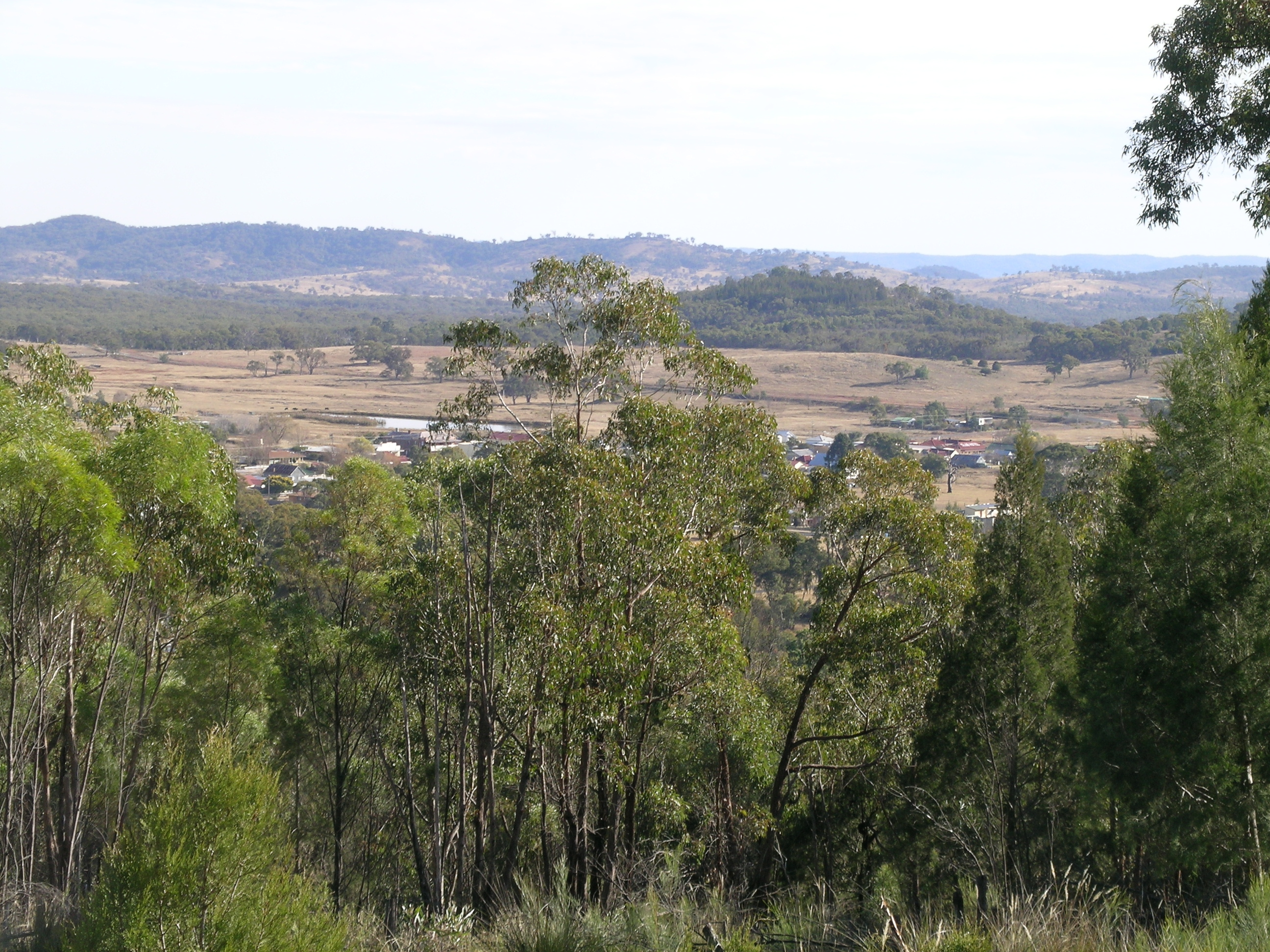
- View of Emmaville

- Coordinates: 29°27′S 151°36′E
- Country: Australia
- State: New South Wales
- LGA: Glen Innes Severn Council
- Location: 662 km (411 mi) NNE of Sydney; 271 km (168 mi) SW of Brisbane; 45 km (28 mi) NW of Glen Innes

Government
  - State electorate: Northern Tablelands
  - Federal division: New England
- Elevation: 890 m (2,920 ft)

Population
  - Total: 519 (2016 census)
- Postcode: 2371
- County: Gough

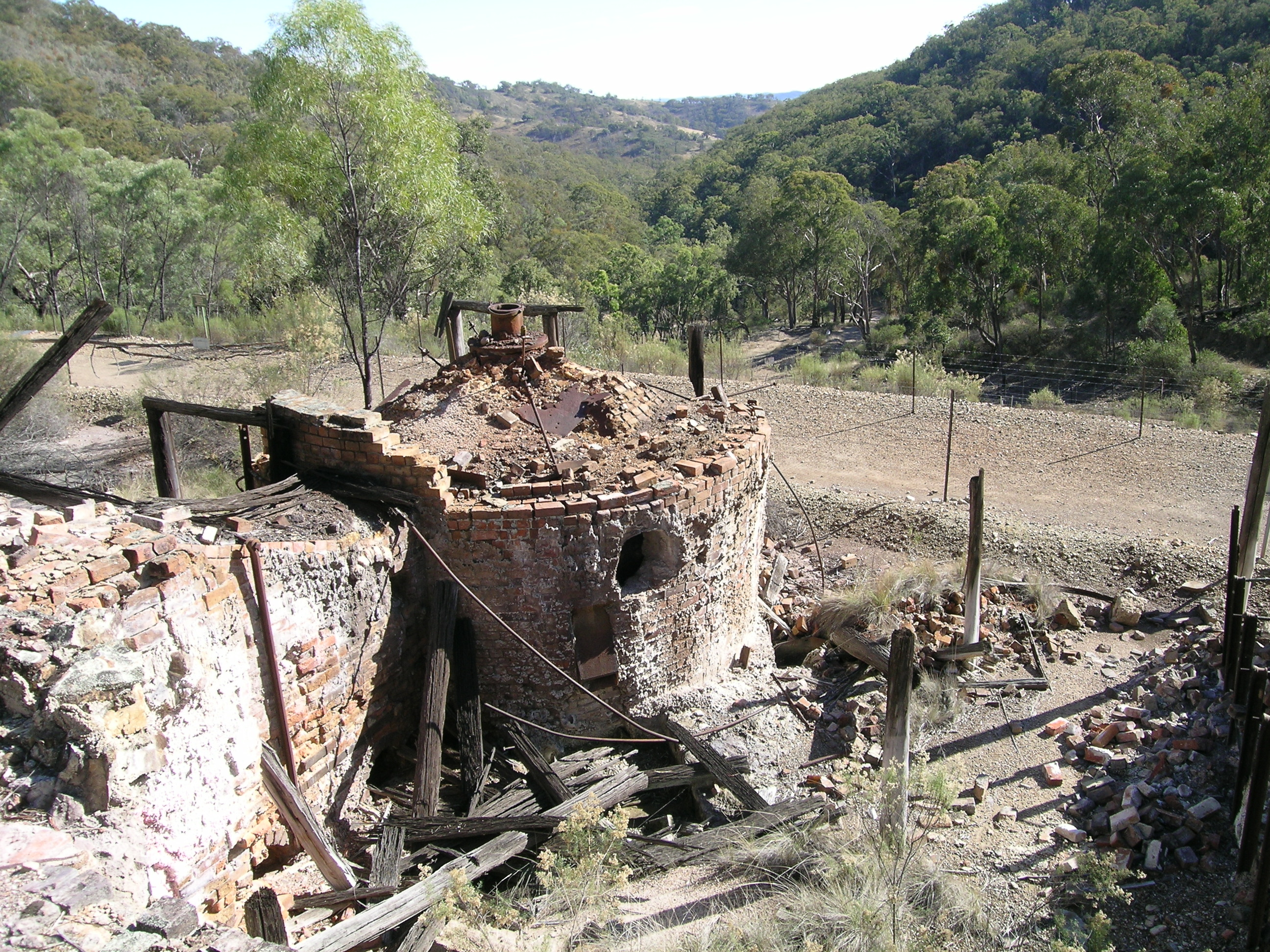
Ottery arsenic mine, near Emmaville.

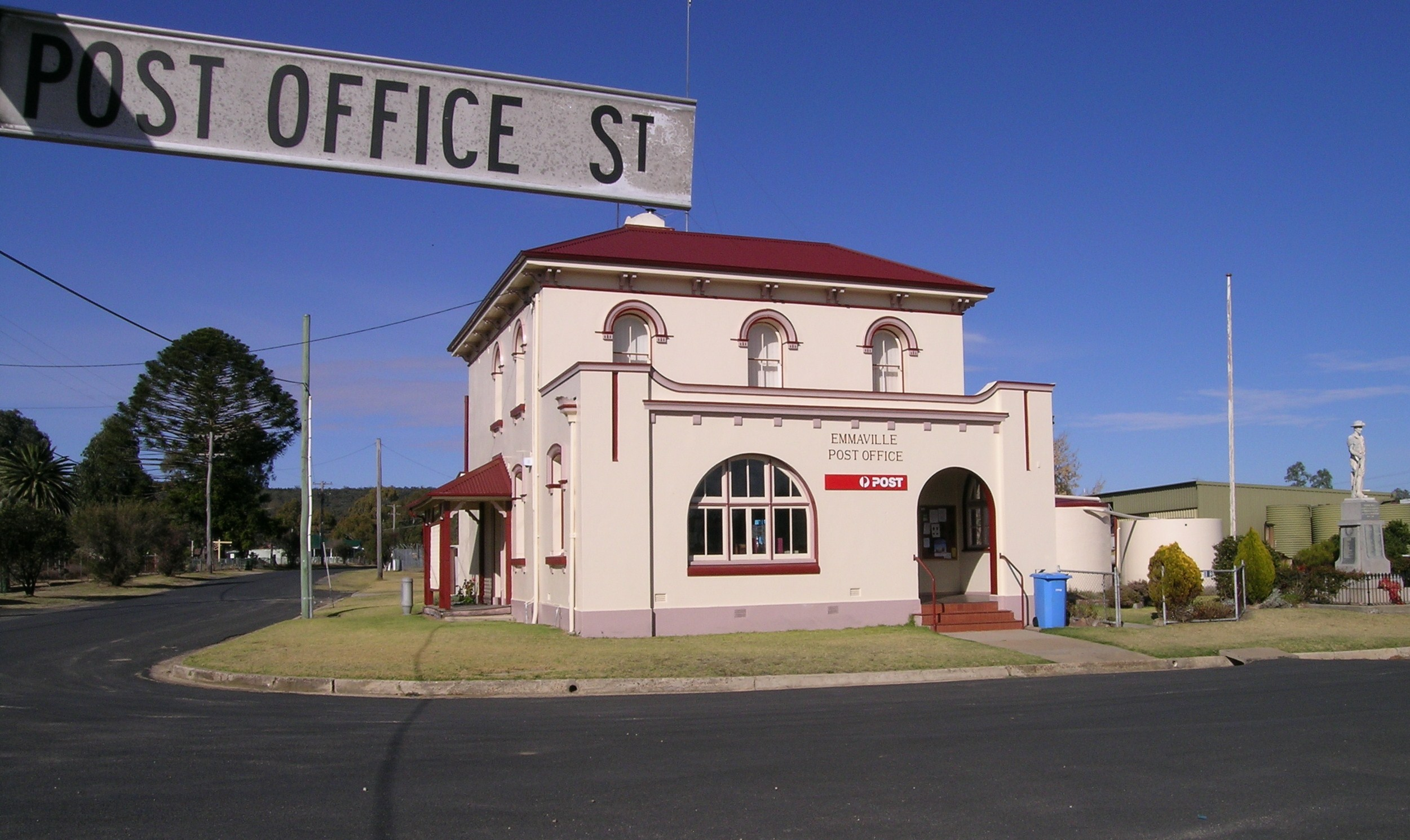
Post Office and war memorial, Emmaville, NSW

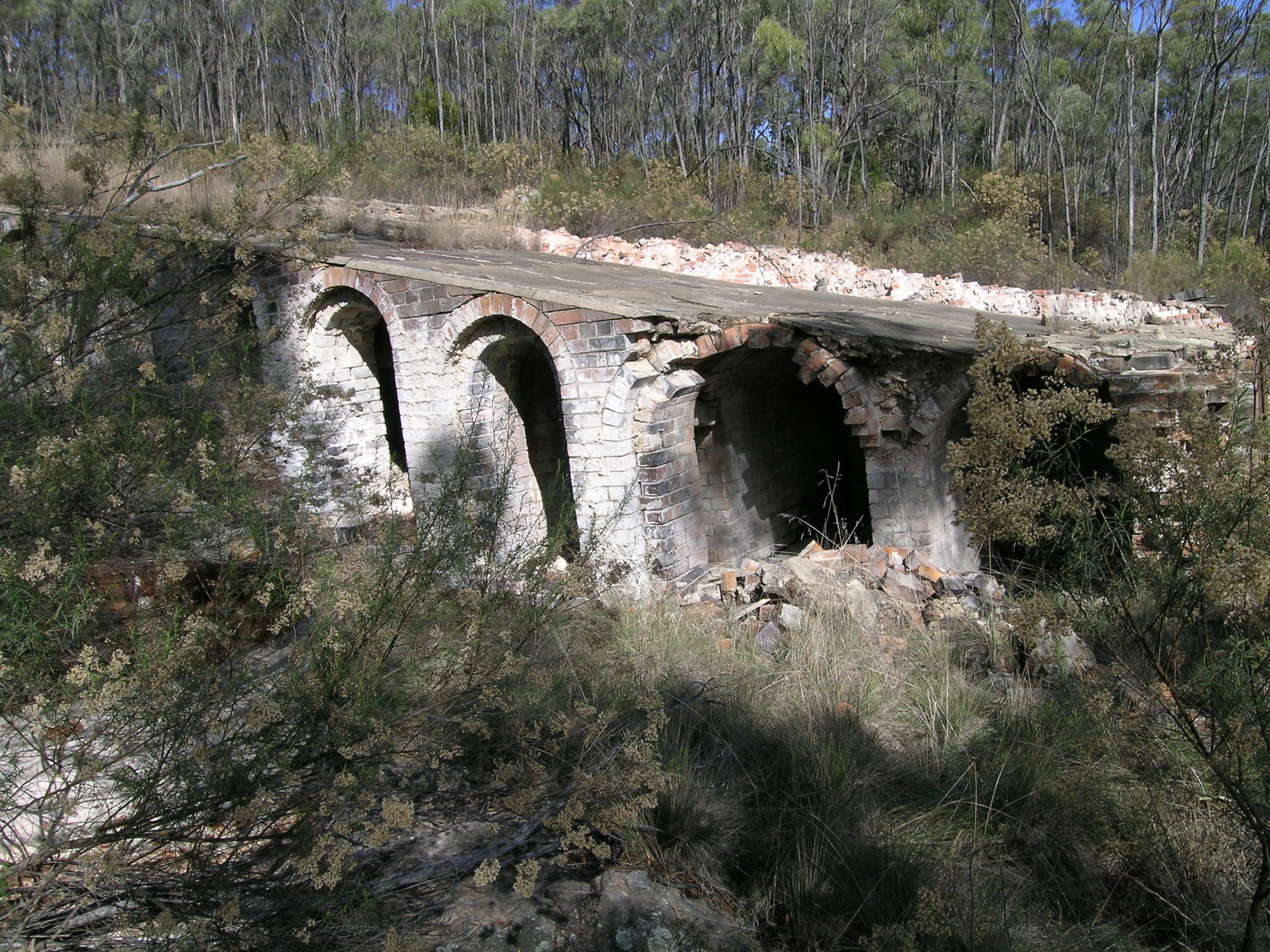
Ottery Arsenic Mine - note the traces of arsenic on the bricks

Emmaville is a town on the Northern Tablelands in the New England region of New South Wales, Australia. It is in the Glen Innes Severn Council district.

Emmaville is at an elevation of 890 metres AHD. At the 2006 census, the Emmaville "urban centre/locality" had a population of 247 (in the 2001 census it was 303) and there were 535 persons usually resident in the Emmaville region.

== History ==
Emmaville is located on the lands of the Ngarabal people, and the area remains of great significance to them today. The Ngarabal name for the land where the township is now located is "Marran", meaning "plenty of leeches".

Tin was first discovered on Strathbogie Station in 1872 and the settlement was called Vegetable Creek after the Chinese market gardens which developed to service the mining population. Being a private township it was never notified or proclaimed as a town or village. The population of the area in the early 1900s was about 7,000 and included 2,000 Chinese people. It was renamed in 1882 after Emma Greville, the wife of the then state Governor Lord Augustus Loftus. The name Vegetable Creek is preserved in the name of the local 17-bed hospital.

A school was established in 1875 and it had 70-80 pupils in its first year. In 1927, the school moved to its present site.

Emmaville established the first medical fund in New South Wales, with aim of keeping a doctor in town and to build a hospital. In 1891, lectures were given at the hospital and the St John Ambulance Brigade was formed as a result of this.

Tin and arsenic were mined at the Ottery Mine, Tent Hill, not far from Emmaville, from 1882 when a huge tin lode was found by Alexander Ottery. The site has now been rehabilitated by the NSW Department of Mineral Resources and has been open to tourists. As of February 2026, Tripadvisor's website includes a statement that "This place is temporarily closed due to remediation works. Works are scheduled to finish in March 2022, weather permitting.", a description of a visit in 2024 which states that "The closed signs are still up although you can still visit.", and an album of 24 photographs showing the mine in 2018 with signboards for visitors.

== Emmaville Panther ==
This is described as "one of Australia's most famous manifestations of a cryptic animal". It was variously said to be a large black panther or a marsupial lion, and was sighted in February 1958 and on various occasions in the later 1950s and 1960s. There are no native big cats in Australia. One suggestion is that this beast escaped from a travelling circus whose owner chose not to report the escape.

== Emmaville today ==
Emmaville's industries are tourism, agriculture, and mining. There is a Mining Museum which includes a collection of mineral specimens and photographs of the town's history. Fossicking is a local tourist activity.

This neat and tidy village has a post office, general store, two craft shops, a swimming pool, a caravan site and two hotels. Emmaville also has a pre-school and a central public school with 60 primary and 28 secondary pupils. Since 2004 Emmaville School has catered for stage 6 students in year 11 and 12 although all of their studies except English and Maths are supplied by Dubbo school of Distance Education. The Vegetable Creek Hospital in Emmaville has 13 residential beds, 4 acute beds and 2 accident and emergency beds a total of 19 beds and is part of the Hunter New England Local Health District.

== Media ==
Local news coverage is provided by Glen Innes News which publishes online as well as in print.

Emmaville is served by community radio station 2CBD FM which broadcasts from studios in Glen Innes. As well as broadcasting on two local FM frequencies 91.1 Deepwater and 105.9 Glen Innes, it has a live 24/7 feed via the internet. The station is the only radio station with studios in Glen Innes and is run by volunteers and presents local information and a diverse mix of music.

== Heritage listings ==
Emmaville has a number of heritage-listed sites, including:

- 8 km north-east: Ottery Mine on the New South Wales State Heritage Register

== Notable people ==
Notable people from or having lived in Emmaville include:

- Frank James Coughlan (1904-1979), jazz musician
- Pearl Duncan, retired teacher, anthropologist, academic and Aboriginal elder.
- Clifford Kwan-Gett, an engineer, physician, and artificial heart pioneer.
- Thomas James Richards (1882-1935), army officer, Olympian, rugby union coach and player and sports writer
- Charles Curnow Scherf (1917-1949), airforce officer, grazier and soldier
- Gordon Sturtridge FRCOG (1906-1963) born in Emmaville represented Victoria and Australia (9 caps) at Rugby union. Later he qualified as a surgeon and practiced in Northampton.
- Debbie Wells (born 1961), former sprinter who competed in the 1976, 1980, and 1984 Summer Olympics.
