= David Tudehope =

Australian physician

- Medical career
- Profession: Physician
- Institutions: Mater Mothers' Hospital; University of Queensland
- Sub-specialties: Neonatology

David Ian Tudehope AM is an Australian physician, specialising in neonatology.

Tudehope is credited with progressing neonatal research in Queensland in his roles as director of neonatology at the Mater Mothers' Hospital and as professor in neonatal paediatrics of the University of Queensland.

He has also served on numerous paediatric committees.

Tudehope was made a Member of the Order of Australia (AM) in the 1999 Australia Day Honours for "service to medicine, particularly in the field of neo-natal paediatrics, and to the Multidisciplinary Growth and Development Clinic". He was named as a Queensland Great in 2002.

After more than 30 years of service, Tudehope retired from his position at the Mater in 2008.

In 2013, Tudehope was named as one of 39 Australia Day Ambassadors in Queensland. In his role as an ambassador, Tudehope attended an Australia Day function in Ingham, Queensland.

Among Tudehope's most notable cases were the birth of quintuplets, Tahlia, Olivia, Mikaela, Madaleine and Ethan Wale in 1991 and the birth of Jonathon Heeley who was born 12 weeks premature in 1992 with a birthweight of 374 grams, making him at that time the smallest baby to have ever survived being born in Australia.

Throughout his career, Tudehope has authored or co-authored a number of neonatology-related books, including:

- Specialised care for newborn babies: an introduction to special care nursery (1982)
- A primer of neonatal medicine (1984)
- Essentials of neonatal medicine (2000)
- Clinical classification systems for evaluating Indigenous perinatal and infant deaths (2001)
