= Gordon Sturtridge (rugby union) =

Australia international rugby union player

- Full name: Gordon Short Sturtridge
- Born: 16 September 1906 Emmaville, NSW, Australia
- Died: 16 September 1963 (aged 57) Northampton, England

Rugby union career
- Position: Centre / Fly-half
International career
Years	Team	Apps	(Points)
1929–33	Australia	9	(3)

Gordon Short Sturtridge (16 September 1906 — 16 September 1963) was an Australian rugby union international.

Sturtridge was born in Emmaville, New South Wales and educated at Brisbane Boys' College.

Primarily a fly-half, Sturtridge played for Melbourne University during his medical studies and was a Victorian interstate representative. He became Victoria's first Wallaby in 1929 when he debuted against the touring All Blacks at the Brisbane Exhibition Ground and was capped nine times for his country in total, including all five Tests on the 1933 tour of South Africa. His Wallabies appearances were made mostly as a centre.

Sturtridge took up a job at England's Northampton General Hospital in 1933 armed with his medical degree and continued his rugby career with Rosslyn Park. He captained Northampton from 1938 to 1941, then in 1950 was appointed club president, a position he still held at the time of his death in 1963.

== See also ==
- List of Australia national rugby union players
