= 2020 Australia Day Honours =

Appointments to orders and honours in Australia

The 2020 Australia Day Honours are appointments to various orders and honours to recognise and reward good works by Australian citizens. The list was announced on 26 January 2020 by the Governor General of Australia, David Hurley.

The Australia Day Honours are the first of the two major annual honours lists, the first announced to coincide with Australia Day (26 January), with the other being the Queen's Birthday Honours, which are announced on the second Monday in June.

== Order of Australia ==
Order of Australia civil ribbon

Order of Australia military ribbon

=== Companion of the Order of Australia (AC) ===
==== General Division ====
- Her Excellency the Honourable Margaret Joan Beazley, AO, QC – For eminent service to the people of New South Wales, particularly through leadership roles in the judiciary, and as a mentor of young women lawyers.
- Professor Margaret Elaine Gardner, AO – For eminent service to tertiary education through leadership and innovation in teaching and learning, research and financial sustainability.
- The Hon. Chief Justice Catherine Ena Holmes – For eminent service to the judiciary, notably to criminal, administrative, and mental health law, and to the community of Queensland.
- Professor Bruce Gregory Robinson, AM – For eminent service to medical research, and to national healthcare, through policy development and reform, and to tertiary education.
- Professor Anthony William Thomas – For eminent service to scientific education and research, particularly in the field of nuclear and particle physics, through academic leadership roles.

=== Officer of the Order of Australia (AO) ===
==== General Division ====
- Ilana Rachel Atlas – For distinguished service to the financial and manufacturing sectors, to education, and to the arts.
- The Hon. Edward Norman Baillieu – For distinguished service to the people and Parliament of Victoria, particularly as Premier, and to international engagement.
- Professor Larissa Behrendt – For distinguished service to Indigenous education and research, to the law, and to the visual and performing arts.
- Distinguished Professor Genevieve Bell – For distinguished service to education, particularly to the social sciences and cultural anthropology.
- Dr John Michael Bennett, AM – For distinguished service to the law through prolific authorship of biographies of eminent members of the legal profession.
- Emeritus Professor John Bloomfield, AM – For distinguished service to higher education in the field of sports science, and to professional sporting organisations.
- Sarah Bradley – For distinguished service to the law, and to the judiciary, to women in the legal profession, and to the community.
- Professor Shaun Patrick Brennecke – For distinguished service to medical education and research in the fields of obstetrics and gynaecology, and to professional societies.
- Professor Rachelle Buchbinder – For distinguished service to medical education in the fields of epidemiology and rheumatology, and to professional associations.
- Professor Robert Graham Cumming – For distinguished service to medical education and research, particularly to ageing and age-related diseases.
- Charles Roderick Curwen, CVO, OBE – For distinguished service to the Crown, and to public administration in Victoria, to medical research, and to Australia-China business relations.
- Professor John Kinley Dewar – For distinguished service to education through leadership roles in the universities sector, and to professional organisations.
- Ian Ross Donges – For distinguished service to primary industry, and to the community of rural New South Wales.
- Ronald Patrick Dullard – For distinguished service to education in Western Australia, to local government, and to the community.
- Peter Adalbert Fritz, AM – For distinguished service to business, particularly to information technology and communications, and to public policy.
- Graham Burton Goldsmith – For distinguished service to the community through philanthropic foundations, to education, and to the banking and employment sectors.
- Robert Malcolm Goot, AM, SC – For distinguished service to the Jewish community through executive roles with educational, cultural and social welfare bodies.
- James Gorman – For distinguished service to the finance and banking sectors through executive roles at the national and international level.
- Dr Donald Morrison Grant, AM, RFD – For distinguished service to surveying, particularly through the establishment of a combined public sector mapping agency.
- Gillian Margaret Groom – For distinguished service to the community through healthcare, medical research, and social welfare organisations, and to the law.
- Emeritus Professor Jules Mitchell Guss – For distinguished service to education and scientific research in the field of molecular bioscience, and to professional organisations.
- Jane Caroline Hansen – For distinguished service to the community, to education and cultural institutions, and through philanthropic support for charitable foundations.
- Ian Andrew Healy – For distinguished service to cricket at the national and international level as a player, to the broadcast media, and to the community.
- Professor Hal Christopher Hill – For distinguished service to education in the field of economic policy development, and to Australia-Indonesia relations.
- Commissioner Darren Leigh Hine APM – For distinguished service to law enforcement as Commissioner of Police in Tasmania, and to the community.
- Peter John Hood – For distinguished service to business and commerce at the state, national and international level, and to the resources sector.
- Julie Kantor – For distinguished service to the community through philanthropy, to Indigenous governance initiatives, and to the visual and performing arts.
- Samuel Lipski, AM – For distinguished service to the community through the promotion of strategic philanthropy, to education, and to Australia-Israel relations.
- Dr Linley Margaret Martin – For distinguished service to education, particularly to student equity, educational standards and academic administration.
- Kevin McCann, AM – For distinguished service to business, to corporate governance, and as an advocate for gender equity.
- Professor Peter Joseph McCluskey – For distinguished service to ophthalmology, and to medical education, to eye health organisations, and to the community.
- Jacqui Elizabeth McGill – For distinguished service to the minerals and mining sector, and to gender equity and workplace diversity.
- Professor Peter McIntyre – For distinguished service to medicine, and to medical education, to child and adolescent health, and to professional bodies.
- Major General David John McLachlan, AO (Mil) (Retd) – For distinguished service to veterans and their families through roles with social welfare and commemoration organisations.
- Fiona Margaret McLeod SC – For distinguished service to the law, and to the legal profession, at the national and international level, and to women lawyers.
- Campbell Kevin Newman – For distinguished service to the people and Parliament of Queensland, particularly as Premier, and to local government.
- The Hon. Barry Robert O'Farrell – For distinguished service to the people and Parliament of New South Wales, particularly as Premier, and to the community.
- Professor John (Michael) Holroyd Permezel – For distinguished service to medicine, and to medical education, in the fields of obstetrics and gynaecology, and to professional colleges.
- Professor John Reginald Piggott – For distinguished service to education, to population ageing research, and to public finance policy development.
- Michael John Rice – For distinguished service to business and economics, particularly to the actuarial profession, and through advisory roles.
- Professor Alison Joan Ritter – For distinguished service to education, to drug and alcohol research and social policy, and to professional medical societies.
- Professor Roy Michael Robins-Browne – For distinguished service to medical education and research in the field of microbiology and immunology, and to professional groups.
- Professor Matthew Roy Sanders – For distinguished service to education and research in clinical psychology, and to child, parent and family wellbeing.
- Professor Robert (John) Simes – For distinguished service to education, and to medicine, in the field of cancer research and clinical trials.
- Emeritus Professor Raymond Louis Specht – For distinguished service to science, and to education, in the fields of botany, plant ecology and conservation.
- Laureate Professor Geoffrey Wayne Stevens – For distinguished service to education, to chemical engineering and environmental remediation, and as a mentor.
- Ian Duncan Stewart APM – For distinguished service to law enforcement as Commissioner of Police in Queensland, and to the community.
- The late Dr Enrico Taglietti – For distinguished service to architecture, particularly in the Australian Capital Territory, to education, and to professional organisations.
- Anne Lorraine Trimmer – For distinguished service to the law, and to the legal profession, to healthcare standards and policy, and to education.
- Keith Lionel Urban – For distinguished service to the performing arts as a singer and songwriter, and to charitable organisations.
- The Hon. Amanda Eloise Vanstone – For distinguished service to the Parliament of Australia, to the people of South Australia, and to the community.
- Dr Brian Harrison Walker – For distinguished service to science, particularly to ecosystem ecology and research, and to professional scientific bodies.
- Professor Rachel Lindsey Webster – For distinguished service to education in the field of astrophysics, to astronomical research, and to young women scientists.
- Gwen Wetzig – For distinguished service to the international community of the Democratic Republic of Congo through medical support, teaching and training programs.
- Dr Neil Robert Wetzig – For distinguished service to the international community of the Democratic Republic of Congo through medical support, teaching and training programs.
- George Bernard Wright – For distinguished service to parliament and politics as National Secretary of the Australian Labor Party, and to business.
- Professor Jeffrey David Zajac – For distinguished service to medical research and education, particularly in the field of endocrinology, and to professional societies.

==== Military Division ====
- Lieutenant General Gregory Charles Bilton, AM, CSC – For distinguished service in the appointments of Deputy Commanding General of the United States Army in the Pacific, Deputy Chief of Joint Operations and Commander Forces Command.

==== Honorary ====
- Hugo Wallace Weaving – For distinguished service to the performing arts as an actor, and as a mentor of young writers, directors and film makers.
- Dr Robyn Williams, AM – For distinguished service to science as a journalist, radio presenter and author, and to education.

=== Member of the Order of Australia (AM) ===
==== General Division ====
- John Arthur Abbott – For significant service to education, and to the resources sector.
- Professor Mohamad Abdalla – For significant service to education in the field of Islamic studies.
- Anthony Abrahams – For significant service to Australia-France relations, and to the law.
- Rosemary Therese Langford Addis – For significant service to social innovation and impact investment, and to the law.
- Robert Harold Annells PSM – For significant service to the tourism and hospitality sector, and to public administration.
- Bettina Mary Arndt – For significant service to the community as a social commentator, and to gender equity through advocacy for men.
- Dr Anne Marie Astin PSM – For significant service to the dairy industry, and to food safety regulations.
- John Charles Batten – For significant service to orthopaedic medicine, and to professional bodies.
- Kenneth Peter Baxter – For significant service to public administration, and to agricultural reform.
- Professor Emerita Joan Errington Beaumont – For significant service to education, particularly to the study of war history.
- Emeritus Professor Warren Arthur Bebbington – For significant service to education, particularly to the study of music.
- Faye Lorraine Berryman – For significant service to education, to literacy, and to the community.
- John David Bevins – For significant service to community health and social welfare organisations.
- Dr Geoffrey Neville Boughton – For significant service to engineering, and to professional bodies.
- Emeritus Professor Thomas (John) Boulton – For significant service to medical education, and to paediatric medicine.
- Dr Stephen James Bourke – For significant service to the international community of Jordan through archaeological projects.
- Dr Frank Patrick Brennan – For significant service to palliative medicine, and to medical education.
- Dr David Stewart Briggs – For significant service to community health management, and to education.
- Emeritus Professor Richard Laurence Broome – For significant service to education in the field of history, and to historical groups.
- Bruce Richard Brown – For significant service to the pearling industry, and to marine research.
- Lyndon Mayfield Brown – For significant service to the pearling industry, and to marine research.
- The Hon. Dr Meredith Anne Burgmann – For significant service to the people and Parliament of New South Wales.
- Elaine Cafferty Carbines – For significant service to conservation and the environment.
- Garry Raymond Casey – For significant service to the community through emergency response organisations.
- Professor Anthony E. Cassimatis – For significant service to education, to the law, and to the community.
- Melanie Grace Champion De Crespigny – For significant service to youth through charitable organisations.
- Annabelle Chaplain – For significant service to business through a range of executive roles.
- Professor Pierre Henri Chapuis – For significant service to medical education, and to colorectal surgery.
- Lisa Chung – For significant service to the community through charitable and cultural organisations.
- Dr Christopher John Clements – For significant service to international public health through immunisation programs.
- The late Dr Stephen Vincent Coles – For significant service to veterinary science, and to professional bodies.
- Dr John Paxton Collins – For significant service to medicine, particularly to breast cancer treatment.
- Dr Joseph James Collins – For significant service to the community through charitable initiatives.
- Shane Owen Colquhoun – For significant service to performing and cultural arts administration.
- Deborah Anne Conway – For significant service to the performing arts as a singer, songwriter and producer.
- Glenise Maxine Coulthard – For significant service to Aboriginal health in South Australia, and to emergency response organisations.
- Jane Selby Covernton – For significant service to the literary arts as a publisher of children's books.
- Marita Louise Cowie – For significant service to community health in rural and remote areas.
- Catherine (Emily) Cox – For significant service to the performing arts through choral music.
- The Hon. Dr Mary Catherine Crawford – For significant service to women, and to the people and Parliament of Australia.
- Judith Margaret Cross – For significant service to community health through social welfare organisations.
- Emeritus Professor Brendan Crotty – For significant service to health education, and to the community.
- Dyan Elizabeth Currie – For significant service to town planning and strategic urban development.
- Dr Geoffrey Michael Currie – For significant service to nuclear medicine and medical radiation science.
- David Edmund Curtain, QC – For significant service to the law, and to professional legal organisations.
- Henry Gibson Dan – For significant service to music, and to the Indigenous community.
- Sara Megan David – For significant service to international humanitarian health programs.
- Sarah Kate Davies – For significant service to the community through a range of executive roles.
- Professor Karen Patricia Day – For significant service to science education, and to global public health.
- Professor Richard de Dear – For significant service to education, particularly the design of the built environment.
- Damian John de Marco – For significant service to the community as a child safety advocate.
- Dr Leoni Marilyn Degenhardt – For significant service to education through the independent schools sector.
- Maria Dimopoulos – For significant service to women, to cultural diversity, and to the prevention of domestic violence.
- Carl John Dowd – For significant service to the community through philanthropic endeavours.
- Justin Joseph Dowd – For significant service to family law, and to professional associations.
- Wendy Dowd – For significant service to the community through philanthropic endeavours.
- The Reverend Ann Bryson Drummond – For significant service to the Uniting Church in Australia, and to women.
- Dr Gillian Mary Duchesne – For significant service to radiation oncology medicine, and to professional medical organisations.
- The late Juli Dugdale – For significant service to young women through leadership development organisations.
- Dr Robert John Edgar – For significant service to the banking and finance sectors, and to medical research organisations.
- Professor Harriet Edquist – For significant service to architectural history and design, and to higher education.
- Dr Paul Elias Eliadis – For significant service to medicine as a clinical haematologist, and to charitable initiatives.
- Allan English – For significant service to the community through philanthropic endeavours.
- Lynette Gwenyth English – For significant service to mental health and consumer support organisations.
- Wesley James Enoch – For significant service to the performing arts as an Indigenous director and playwright.
- Terence Charles Evans – For significant service to higher education, to health organisations, and to the law.
- Dr Graham John Faichney – For significant service to science in the fields of animal nutrition and physiology.
- Dr Ian James Fairnie – For significant service to the community, and to veterinary and agricultural organisations.
- Andrew Charles Farriss – For significant service to the performing arts as a musician, composer and producer.
- Mary Featherston – For significant service to the arts, particularly to interior and industrial design.
- Paul James Field – For significant service to the arts, particularly to children's entertainment, and as a supporter of charitable endeavours.
- Emeritus Professor John Joseph Fitzgerald – For significant service to higher education, particularly in the field of Chinese studies.
- Diane Mildred Fleming – For significant service to Australia-Africa relations, and to education.
- Peter Charles Flinn – For significant service to agricultural research through the promotion of near-infrared spectroscopy.
- The late John Clement Fordham, OAM – For significant service to the community through philanthropic support for a range of foundations.
- George Cameron Fox – For significant service to the law, to professional legal organisations, and to the community.
- Professor Raelene Frances – For significant service to history studies as a teacher, researcher and author.
- Christine Franks – For significant service to the community through social welfare initiatives.
- Dr Erica Frydenberg – For significant service to psychology as a researcher, educator and adviser.
- Kim Gillis – For significant service to public administration, and to defence projects.
- Emeritus Professor Jeffrey Denys Goldsworthy – For significant service to education, particularly to legal history and philosophy.
- Rachel Ann Griffiths – For significant service to the performing arts as an actor.
- Johanna Leigh Griggs – For significant service to community health, to television, and to sport.
- Matthew Thomas Grounds – For significant service to the financial investment sector, and to the community.
- Dr Sanghamitra Guha – For significant service to medicine, and to medical education.
- Emeritus Professor Anthony John Guttmann – For significant service to the mathematical sciences, and to education.
- Allan Thomas Haggarty – For significant service to the community through a range of roles.
- The Hon. Hartley Roland Hansen, QC – For significant service to the law, and to professional associations.
- Dallas Elspeth Hayden – For significant service to the Australian community.
- Dr Janice Leona Hills – For significant service to veterinary science, and to the community.
- Dr Vedella May Hinckley – For significant service to medicine as a plastic and reconstructive surgeon.
- Bella Hirshorn – For significant service to the Jewish community, and to women.
- Trina Coral Hockley – For significant service to the community, and to business.
- Grant Donald Hunt – For significant service to the tourism and hospitality sectors.
- Jennifer Ruth Hurley – For significant service to the community through charitable organisations.
- Geoffrey Ian Huston – For significant service to science, and through pioneering roles with the internet.
- Dr Alison Scott Inglis – For significant service to education, and to the museum and galleries sector.
- Catherine Mary Inglis – For significant service to the building and construction industry.
- Dr Robyn Rae Iredale – For significant service to people with an intellectual disability, and to education.
- David Harley Jacobs – For significant service to Australia-Japan relations, and to business.
- Dr Miles Gareth Jakeman – For significant service to business, to national security, and to the community.
- Dr Gael Jennings – For significant service to science, and to the broadcast media.
- Alana Therese Johnson – For significant service to women through leadership and advisory roles.
- Professor Margaret Anne Jolly – For significant service to education, particularly to gender and Pacific studies.
- Rabbi Zalman Kastel – For significant service to interfaith and intercultural understanding and acceptance.
- Barry Leonard Kelly – For significant service to the mining and minerals sectors, and to business.
- The Hon. Charles Roderick Kemp – For significant service to the Parliament of Australia, and to the people of Victoria.
- Rae Merlyn Kingsbury – For significant service to the international community of Timor Leste.
- Christine Elizabeth Kirby – For significant service to the community, and to women.
- Professor Martin Evald Krygier – For significant service to legal education, and to professional associations.
- Murray Wayne Lampard APM – For significant service to the community of Western Australia.
- Douglas Lawrence, OAM – For significant service to the performing arts, particularly to chamber choirs.
- Helen Louise Leake – For significant service to film, and to professional organisations.
- Dr David Ronald Leece PSM, RFD, ED – For significant service to the environment, and to defence and security studies.
- Dr Michael Kwok Leung – For significant service to medicine, and to the international community.
- Rose Lew – For significant service to the community, and to philanthropy.
- Dorothy Hazel Lipmann – For significant service to the elderly, and to the visual arts.
- Susan Mary Logie-Smith – For significant service to the decorative and fine arts.
- The late Eric William Lumsden PSM – For significant service to public administration, and to planning.
- Kenneth Duncan MacDonald – For significant service to the law, and to the legal profession.
- Jenni Mack – For significant service to business through consumer advocacy roles.
- Dr Robert David Macpherson – For significant service to the visual arts.
- Robin (Bobbi) Mahlab – For significant service to women, to publishing, and to philanthropy.
- Keelen Marie Mailman – For significant service to the Indigenous community of Queensland.
- Michael Kevin Malouf – For significant service to local government, and to the community of Victoria.
- Professor Lenore Hilda Manderson – For significant service to education, particularly medical anthropology, and to public health.
- Duncan Antony Marshall – For significant service to heritage conservation.
- Julie Marie Mason – For significant service to the community, and to education.
- Janet Patricia Matton – For significant service to the information technology and health sectors.
- Rachael Zoa Maza – For significant service to the performing arts as an artistic director.
- Kathryn Anne McClymont – For significant service to the print media, and to investigative journalism.
- Vicki Gayle McDonald – For significant service to librarianship, and to professional associations.
- Catherine (Ludo) McFerran – For significant service to women and children, and to social justice.
- Graham Robert McKenzie-Smith – For significant service to military history preservation, and to forestry.
- Dr Helen Diana McLean – For significant service to dentistry, and to professional associations.
- Dr Suzanne Bridget McNicol, QC – For significant service to the law, and to the legal profession.
- Paul Joseph Mercurio – For significant service to the performing arts, particularly to dance.
- Janine Louise Middleton – For significant service to the LGBTIQ community, and to marriage equality.
- Timothy David Minchin – For significant service to the performing arts, and to the community.
- Heather Lee Mitchell – For significant service to the performing arts, and to the community.
- Professor Marjory Lucy Moodie – For significant service to education, particularly to health economics.
- Cathi Moore – For significant service to young women, and to the community.
- The Reverend Canon Dr John Laurence Morgan – For significant service to education, and to the Anglican Church of Australia.
- John Patrick Mullen – For significant service to business, and to the community.
- Patricia Anne Murray – For significant service to the community through family social welfare associations.
- Dr Anthony Leigh Mylius – For significant service to community health, and to cardiology.
- Professor Marea Nicholson – For significant service to education, and to professional standards.
- Melissa Noonan – For significant service to people with a disability.
- Professor Pauline Margaret Nugent – For significant service to education, and to nursing.
- Emeritus Professor John Frederick O'Callaghan – For significant service to information technology, and to education.
- Caroline Ann O'Connor – For significant service to the performing arts, particularly to musical theatre.
- The late Patricia Maria O'Donnell – For significant service to the community through a range of roles.
- William Patrick O'Shea – For significant service to the legal profession, and to the community.
- Dr John William Orchard – For significant service to sports medicine, particularly to cricket.
- Peter John Overton – For significant service to the broadcast media, and to the community.
- David Philip Paratz – For significant service to the Jewish community of Queensland, and to the law.
- Colleen Georgette Pearce – For significant service to the community through public advocacy roles.
- Dr Peter Andreas Pedersen – For significant service to military history as an author and researcher.
- Robert Maxwell Penfold – For significant service to the broadcast media, and to journalism.
- The late Lieutenant Colonel Barry Petersen, MC (Retd) – For significant service to the international community of Thailand.
- Sabine Cornelia Phillips – For significant service to aged welfare, and to the legal profession.
- Peter James Plummer – For significant service to higher education, to health research, and to public administration.
- Professor Laura Poole-Warren – For significant service to education, and to biomedical engineering.
- Emeritus Professor Sharman Ellen Pretty – For significant service to music education, and to the performing arts.
- The late Professor Steven Russell Raine – For significant service to soil science and agriculture, and to education.
- The late Daniel Leo Reardon – For significant service to the community of Tasmania through social welfare and charitable organisations.
- Jennifer Mary Richter – For significant service to medical administration, and to community health.
- Emeritus Professor Staniforth Ricketson – For significant service to legal education, and to intellectual property law.
- Dr Peter William Riddles – For significant service to science, to biotechnology, and to innovation.
- The Hon. Fredrick Riebeling – For significant service to the people and Parliament of Western Australia.
- Gary Phillip Roberts – For significant service to the broadcast media, particularly to radio.
- David Michael Ross – For significant service to the Indigenous community of Central Australia.
- Violet Roumeliotis – For significant service to the community, particularly to refugee support.
- Dr Walter John Russell – For significant service to medicine in the field of anaesthesia, and to medical health standards.
- Dr Sabar Rustomjee – For significant service to psychotherapy, and to community health.
- Dr John Dominic Santamaria – For significant service to intensive care medicine.
- Janine Sargeant – For significant service to medical administration through a range of roles.
- Marion Albertje Saville – For significant service to women's health through cervical screening initiatives.
- George Savvides – For significant service to the community, to charitable groups, and to business.
- Michael James Scott – For significant service to urban development, and to the community.
- Robyn Margaret Sexton – For significant service to the law, and to the judiciary.
- Dr Errol Vernon Seymour – For significant service to the oil and gas industry, and to engineering.
- Emeritus Professor Cindy Shannon – For significant service to Indigenous health, and to medical education.
- Professor Robert Keith Shepherd – For significant service to biomedical research, and to education.
- Vianney Shiel – For significant service to electronic engineering, and to education.
- John A Simpson – For significant service to people who are blind or have low vision.
- Christine Lois Simpson Stokes – For significant service to the community through cultural organisations.
- Keith Nichol Slater – For significant service to cricket, Australian rules football, and baseball, in Western Australia.
- Dr Judith Beryl Smart – For significant service to education, to social research, and to women.
- Damien John Smith – For significant service to business through a range of roles.
- Georgina Jane Somerset – For significant service to primary industry, to women, and to the community.
- Carol (Carlotta) Spencer – For significant service to the performing arts, and to the LGBTIQ community.
- Claire Elena Spencer – For significant service to arts administration, and to the community.
- The late Jeremy Mark Spinak – For significant service to the Jewish community, to multicultural relations, and to interfaith dialogue.
- Julie Anne Steiner – For significant service to business through a range of roles.
- Emeritus Professor Vivian Bruce Sunderland – For significant service to education, particularly to pharmacy.
- Dr Robert Jeffrey Sward – For significant service to primary industry, to genetechnology, and to the Jewish community.
- Professor Acram Momolook Taji – For significant service to education, particularly to horticultural science and plant biotechnology.
- Dr Peter George Thorne – For significant service to computer science education, and to history.
- Robert Murray Torrance – For significant service to the building and construction industry.
- Vincent Tremaine – For significant service to shipping infrastructure and freight transport.
- Dr Mathew Ansel Trinca Talalin – For significant service to the museums and galleries sector.
- Professor Kenneth Thomas Trotman – For significant service to education, particularly to accounting.
- Daniel Philip Tucker – For significant service to mining, and to the Indigenous community.
- Michael Robert Tyack – For significant service to the performing arts as a musical director.
- Richard Ashton Warner – For significant service to agricultural research and development.
- Professor Lea Elizabeth Waters-Scholes – For significant service to education, and to psychology.
- Emeritus Professor Roderick Tucker Wells – For significant service to education, and to the biological sciences.
- Dr Ann Felicity Westmore – For significant service to medical history, and to science communication.
- Emeritus Professor Edward Thomas White – For significant service to higher education, particularly to chemical engineering.
- Tracey Whiting – For significant service to the museums and galleries sector.
- Georgina Dulcie Williams – For significant service to the Indigenous community through advocacy roles.
- John Denis Witheriff – For significant service to business, and to the community of the Gold Coast.
- Dr Dedee Daryl Woodside – For significant service to animal conservation, and to zoological organisations.
- Dr Graeme Leonard Worboys – For significant service to conservation and the environment, and to the community.
- Heathcote McMichael Wright, QC – For significant service to the law, and to the performing arts.
- Dr Desiree Swei-Lien Yap – For significant service to women's health, and to medicine.
- Professor Justin John Yerbury – For significant service to education and research in the field of biological sciences.
- John Zerunge Young – For significant service to the visual arts, and as a role model.

==== Military Division ====
- Brigadier Michael Charles Ashleigh – For exceptional service as Director Logistics - Army, Director General Strategic Logistics and Commander Australian Army Cadets.
- Lieutenant Colonel Alyson Marie Auliff – For exceptional service to the Australian Defence Force in malaria research.
- Captain Warren James Bairstow, CSC, RAN – For exceptional service to the Royal Australian Navy in the field of command and leadership.
- Air Commodore Wendy Blyth – For exceptional service to the Australian Defence Force in C-130J Super Hercules sustainment reform; and in P-8A Poseidon capability development and system sustainment.
- Captain Shane Andrew Craig, RAN – For exceptional performance of duty in Royal Australian Navy command and management positions.
- Colonel Nicholas James Foxall – For exceptional service in command and leadership and significantly enhancing the operational effects and capabilities of the Australian Defence Force.
- Major General Andrew William Freeman – For exceptional service to the Australian Defence Force as Commander 17th Brigade, Director General Land Operations, and Director Logistics - Army.
- Air Commodore Philip Stephen Gordon – For exceptional service in aerospace capability development, air combat preparedness and operations management and control for the Australian Defence Force.
- Brigadier Stephen John Jobson, CSC – For exceptional service as Commandant Army Recruit Training Centre, Commander 16th Aviation Brigade and Commander Joint Task Force 646.
- Group Captain Leanne Patricia Lee – For exceptional service in airworthiness practice, F-35 Joint Strike Fighter operational certification, and E-7A Airborne Early Warning and Control sustainment for the Australian Defence Force.
- Colonel Andrew John McBaron – For exceptional service as the Director of Officer Career Management - Army, Career Adviser for General Service Officer Lieutenant Colonels, and Staff Officer Grade One Establishments.
- Air Commodore Kenneth John Robinson, CSC – For exceptional service to the Australian Defence Force in international engagement, personnel management and administration, and combat support development and sustainment.
- Air Commodore Gerald Anthony Van Leeuwen, CSM – For exceptional service to the Australian Defence Force in aerospace capability development, major capital acquisition, and air combat sustainment.

==== Honorary ====
- Elisabeth Margaret Newman – For significant service to women at the national and international level.
- Roland Sylvester Peelman – For significant service to music.
- Constance Kimberly Seagram – For significant service to tourism, and to business, in Tasmania.
- Glenn Barrie Shorrock – For significant service to the performing arts as a singer, songwriter and entertainer.

=== Medal of the Order of Australia (OAM) ===
==== General Division ====
- Robert John Abbot – For service to local government, and to the communities of Noosa and the Sunshine Coast.
- Sandra Gai Ackers – For service to the community through charitable initiatives.
- Lindsay Mark Adams – For service to the professional speaking industry.
- Joanna Geraldine Agius – For service to people who are deaf or hard of hearing, and to the Indigenous community.
- Dr Qazi Ashfaq Ahmad – For service to the Muslim community, and to interfaith relations.
- Julie Christine Ainsworth – For service to the community of Newcastle.
- Daryl James Akers – For service to conservation and the environment.
- Margaret Alice Aldous – For service to nursing.
- Alison Moorna Alexander – For service to the tourism and hospitality industry.
- Diana Joy Alexander – For service to education, and to the community of Lockhart.
- Geoffrey Robert Alexander – For service to the community of Shepparton.
- Brian Leslie Allen – For service to education in developing countries, and to the community.
- Ronda May Alterator – For service to netball.
- Julie Michelle Anderson – For service to veterans and their families.
- Robyn McDonald Anderson – For service to children through hospital charitable organisations.
- Rebecca Andrews – For service to the community of West Papua, and to equestrian organisations.
- Phillip Nicholas Antippa – For service to thoracic surgery, and to music.
- Lorna Apelt – For service to aged welfare.
- Joseph (Yossi) Aron – For service to the Jewish community of Victoria.
- Charles Albert Aronson – For service to the Jewish community of New South Wales.
- Antonio Arrigo – For service to the community of Bunyip.
- Julie Ann Arthur – For service to local government, and to the community of the Fraser Coast.
- Robert Barry Auston – For service to veterans through a range of organisations.
- Patricia Joyce Bailey – For service to the community of Cairns, and to rugby league.
- Rosanna Baini – For service to the Lebanese community of Victoria.
- Glenn McGregor Baker – For service to children through charitable organisations.
- Jason Paul Baker – For service to rowing.
- Dianne Ball – For service to the Indigenous community of the Hunter.
- Laurie Ernest Barber – For service to the community of Port Macquarie.
- Leonard Robert Barlow – For service to veterans and their families.
- Eve Barratt – For service to the community through social welfare organisations.
- Richard Joseph Barry – For service to veterans and their families, and to the community of Narrabri.
- Patrick Joseph Bartolo – For service to the Maltese community of New South Wales.
- Nancy Dawn Bates – For service to the community of Maryborough.
- Joel Becker – For service to literary organisations.
- Lisa Ann Beehag – For service to netball.
- Lindsay Gregory Beer – For service to the community through a range of organisations.
- Neville Dickson Bell – For service to horse racing, and to the community of Caboolture.
- Richard Palmer Bennett – For service to photography.
- Albert Bensimon – For service to business, and to the community.
- Suzanne Bergersen – For service to swimming.
- Harry Herman Better – For service to the Jewish community of Victoria.
- Russell (John) Beynon – For service to the community of Bairnsdale.
- Jocelyn Bignold – For service to the community through social welfare organisations.
- Richard Beresford Bignold – For service to surf lifesaving.
- William Hugh Biscoe – For service to the community of the Barossa.
- Helen Margaret Black – For service to the community of Pittsworth.
- Lawrence Peter Black – For service to primary industry, and to the community.
- The Reverend Margaret Jane Blair – For service to the Uniting Church in Australia.
- Simon Leigh Bloomer – For service to veterans and their families.
- Brian Stuart Blythe – For service to business, and to the community.
- Rosalind Bodley – For service to the community through a range of organisations.
- David Kevin Booth – For service to the community of Gosford.
- Mark P S Bourchier – For service to the community of South Australia.
- Dr Michael John Bowden – For service to the Indigenous community of the Northern Territory.
- Wayne Morris Bowden – For service to music, particularly through brass bands.
- Lillian Ruth Bowen – For service to the Indigenous community of Cape York.
- Peter William Boyes – For service to the community of Queensland.
- Connell Francis Brannelly – For service to the community of Darwin.
- Coralie Elizabeth Brannelly – For service to the community of Darwin.
- Eulalie Perry Brewster – For service to the community of Inverloch.
- Jonathan Ashley Briggs – For service to community history.
- Rear Admiral Peter Douglas Briggs, AO, CSC (Retd) – For service to the preservation, commemoration and promotion of Australian naval heritage.
- Darryl Gregory Brohman – For service to rugby league.
- Aubrey Gordon Brooks – For service to the community of Newcastle.
- Dr Catherine Janet Brown – For service to the community through charitable organisations.
- Noeline Mabel Brown – For service to the performing arts as an actor and entertainer.
- Raymond Brown – For service to conservation and the environment.
- Thelma June Bryan – For service to youth, and to swimming.
- Joseph Francis Buhagiar – For service to the community of the Southern Highlands.
- The late Robert Charles Bulley – For service to the community through charitable organisations.
- Judy Charlotte Burke – For service to community health.
- Patricia L Burke – For service to the community through charitable organisations.
- Robyne Margaret Burridge – For service to people with a disability.
- Maree Rosalie Byrne – For service to the community of the Southern Highlands.
- Georgina Byrom – For service to the Anglican Church of Australia, and to education.
- Kenneth James Callander – For service to horse racing as a journalist and presenter.
- Dr Donald Graham Campbell – For service to trauma medicine.
- Donald Percival Cant – For service to the community through a range of organisations.
- Karen Elizabeth Carey – For service to secondary education.
- Cedric Lyle Carr – For service to the community of Geelong, and to accountancy.
- Geoffrey Marc Carr – For service to rugby league.
- Peter James Carter – For service to canoeing.
- Mark Caruana – For service to the Maltese community of New South Wales.
- Sister Monica Mary Cavanagh – For service to the Catholic Church of Australia.
- Jahna Cedar – For service to the Indigenous community of Western Australia.
- Umesh Chandra – For service to the multicultural community of Queensland.
- Kenneth Ray Chapman – For service to the community of Cabramatta.
- Joy Charlton – For service to equestrian sports.
- Judith Anne Charnaud – For service to conservation and the environment in Timor Leste.
- Paulette Dell Cherny – For service to the Jewish community of Victoria.
- Michael Wan-Man Choi – For service to the people and Parliament of Queensland.
- Tasneem Chopra – For service to the community through a range of roles.
- Dr Ian Melvyn Chung – For service to the law, to medicine, and to the community.
- Dr Adele Chynoweth – For service to public history.
- Klaus Vilis Cimdins – For service to veterans and their families.
- Sandra Joan Clark – For service to Indigenous education, and to the community.
- James Clarke – For service to the community of Jurien Bay.
- Pamela Nance Clarke – For service to local government, and to the community of Horsham.
- Robyn Madelon Claydon – For service to education, and to the Anglican Church of Australia.
- Anthony David Clifford – For service to the Jewish community of Sydney.
- Roger Alexander Clifford – For service to the Jewish community of Sydney.
- Susan Gaye Clutterbuck – For service to people who are deaf or hard of hearing.
- Andrew James Coad – For service to the community through a range of roles.
- Leif Robert Cocks – For service to the conservation of endangered animals.
- Dr Phillip Seldon Cocks – For service to medicine, and to medical associations.
- Robert Andrew Coffey – For service to the community of Warrnambool.
- Rabbi Dr Jeffrey Cohen – For service to community health, and to interfaith organisations.
- Marlis Cohen – For service to the Jewish community.
- Peter Combe – For service to the performing arts, particularly music for children.
- Dr Michael Thomas Connor – For service to medicine, and to the community.
- Helen Rosemary Connor-Kendray – For service to people with Parkinson's.
- Fred Conway – For service to conservation and the environment.
- Genelle Cook – For service to people who are deaf or hard of hearing.
- Dallas Antoinette Cooper – For service to badminton, and to the community.
- John Alan Cootes – For service to the community, particularly to social welfare organisations.
- Elizabeth Corke – For service to conservation and the environment.
- Anthony John Corr – For service to cricket.
- Margaret Mary Cossey – For service to Indigenous literacy and special-needs education.
- Dr Lynne Maree Coulson Barr – For service to community mental health.
- Christopher Richard Cox – For service to the performing arts, and to the community.
- Lindsay Hamilton Crawford – For service to the community of Paynesville.
- Warren James Cree – For service to youth, and to the community.
- Joan Winifred Cribb – For service to higher education as a botanist, and to the community.
- Julie Margaret Cromer – For service to disability support organisations.
- Peter Crook – For service to the community of Kinglake, and to veterans and their families.
- William Richard Cruwys – For service to veterans and their families.
- Simon Charles Cubitt – For service to the community of southern Western Australia.
- Ashley Alfred Cupitt – For service to the community of Yungaburra, and to boxing.
- Susan Margaret Cure – For service to swimming.
- Krystyna Cyron – For service to the Polish community of New South Wales.
- Robert Philip Dance – For service to waterskiing.
- Thomas Frank Danos – For service to the law, and to the community.
- Colin Bruce Darts – For service to veterans and their families.
- Anna Louise Davey – For service to circus performance and physical theatre.
- Maude Alice Davey – For service to the performing arts, particularly as an artistic director.
- Beth Davidson – For service to local government, and to the community.
- Ivo Douglas Davies – For service to the community of the Wheatbelt region of Western Australia.
- Ruth Adelaide Daws – For service to netball, and to the community.
- Barbara May Dawson – For service to veterans and their families.
- Valerie Josephine Dawson – For service to the performing arts as a singer and songwriter.
- Gionni Di Gravio – For service to community history, particularly as an archivist.
- Philip John Dickie – For service to the print media as a journalist.
- Maxwell Gordon Dingle – For service to the visual arts through curatorial roles.
- Barry Robert Dobson – For service to athletics.
- Jennifer Christine Doubell – For service to the community through charitable organisations.
- Kerrie Anne Dougherty – For service to astronautical history as a curator.
- Annette Douglass – For service to youth through Scouts.
- Peter George Doukas – For service to multiculturalism in New South Wales.
- John Dring – For service to the rail transport industry.
- Peter James Dunn – For service to community history.
- John Dyball – For service to education.
- Carter Edwards – For service to the broadcast media, particularly to radio.
- Frederick (Gary) Edwards – For service to the community through a range of organisations.
- Kathryn Margaret Edwards – For service to the community through a range of organisations.
- Robert John Edwards – For service to the international community of Fiji.
- Dr Zenaida Sicat Edwards – For service to the community, and to heritage preservation.
- The late Brian Paul Egan – For service to people in rural areas through social welfare support programs.
- The late Christine Joyce Egan – For service to the Indigenous community of South Australia.
- Nerida Egan – For service to people in rural areas through social welfare support programs.
- Professor Diana Egerton-Warburton – For service to emergency medicine.
- Faiza El-Higzi – For service to the community through social welfare organisations.
- Hassib Elias – For service to the Palestinian community of New South Wales.
- Clinical Associate Professor Nicholas John Evans – For service to neonatal medicine.
- Richard John Farrant – For service to golf.
- Judith Feiglin – For service to the Jewish community.
- Judith Ferber – For service to the performing arts.
- Mark Leeds Ferguson – For service to veterans and their families.
- Marie Ann Ficarra – For service to the people and Parliament of New South Wales.
- Carly Findlay – For service to people with a disability.
- Robert George Flack – For service to the community of Bendigo, and to finance.
- Louise Anne Flitcroft Paisley – For service to the community through charitable organisations.
- Mary Teresa Foley – For service to the community of Redcliffe.
- Kira Joy Fong – For service to the Indigenous community of the Kimberley.
- The late Peter Ford – For service to heritage railway organisations.
- Peter John Forster – For service to conservation and the environment.
- Simun Franjic – For service to the Croatian community of the Australian Capital Territory.
- Kerry Lee Franklin – For service to softball.
- Associate Professor Cecily Jane Freemantle – For service to medical research, particularly to population health.
- Paul Matthew Freestone – For service to the road transport industry, and to the community.
- Colleen Debra Furlanetto – For service to community health.
- Glenise Gale – For service to swimming.
- Dr Vincent Bernard Gallichio – For service to medicine.
- Sherryl Maree Garbutt – For service to the people and Parliament of Victoria.
- Stephen Charles Garbutt – For service to the community through emergency response organisations.
- Dr Murray John Garde – For service to the Indigenous community of the Northern Territory.
- Peter Phillip Gash – For service to eco-tourism, and to aviation.
- Craig Robert Gear – For service to aged welfare and seniors rights.
- Dennis James Gee – For service to surf lifesaving.
- Linda George – For service to music education.
- Stephen (Mark) Gilbert – For service to engineering, and to the community.
- Eileen Mary Giles – For service to people who are homeless.
- Annette Massie Gillen – For service to the community of South Australia.
- Reynold William Gilson – For service to music through brass bands.
- Ronald Richard Giveen, OAM (Mil) – For service to veterans and their families, and to the community.
- Dr Hazel Fern Goldberg – For service to respiratory medicine.
- John Dale Golotta – For service to veterans.
- Jolyon Bryham Good – For service to the community of Sandringham.
- William Arthur Goodrem – For service to the communities of the Mornington Peninsula and Southport.
- James Kevan Goodworth – For service to education.
- Dr Antony Robert Graham – For service to medicine as a vascular surgeon.
- Barry Lindsay Grant – For service to veterans and their families.
- Robyn A Gray – For service to community history.
- Ian Russell Green – For service to Buddhism, and to interfaith relations.
- Kerry Isabelle Greenwood – For service to literature as a writer.
- Richard David Griffiths – For service to the community through social welfare organisations.
- Geoffrey Ross Grinton – For service to the Uniting Church in Australia.
- Rodney Eric Grummitt – For service to youth through Scouts.
- Doreen Patricia Gunn – For service to aged welfare.
- Promilla Gupta – For service to the Indian community, and to multiculturalism.
- Annette Jane Guterres – For service to veterans and their families.
- Paul Anthony Hackett – For service to the community through a range of organisations.
- George Halvagis – For service to the community, particularly to people affected by crime.
- Pamela Mary Hamence – For service to the community through emergency response organisations.
- Colin Hamley – For service to veterans and their families.
- Denise Hanly – For service to the community of Ipswich.
- Dr Ian Victor Hansen – For service to the community, and to education.
- Vivienne Julie Harkness – For service to community health.
- Pauline Zoe Harris – For service to the community.
- Donald Leslie Harrison – For service to the community through emergency response organisations.
- Michael Anthony Hartung – For service to sport for people with a disability.
- John Francis Harvey – For service to motor sports.
- Nancye Margaret Hawke – For service to the community of Gerroa.
- Rosemary Anne Hehir – For service to the community through social welfare organisations.
- Peter Turnbull Hemery – For service to sailing.
- Elva Margaret Henderson – For service to veterans and their families.
- Brian Douglas Hern – For service to the Uniting Church in Australia.
- Terence Robert Hetherington – For service to community history.
- Associate Professor Ian Donald Hewson – For service to dentistry.
- David Colin Hicks – For service to people with a disability.
- Neil Laurence Hirt – For service to the community.
- Andrew Paul Hoban – For service to surf lifesaving.
- Graham William Hobbs – For service to youth, and to lacrosse.
- Karen Laurel Hones – For service to the community of Bundanoon.
- Erik Norman Horrie – For service to rowing.
- Garry Robert Howe – For service to the community of the Cardinia shire.
- Kenneth John Howes – For service to youth through Scouts.
- Colin Horace Howlett – For service to local government, and to the community of the Southern Midlands.
- Tony Humphrey – For service to community health through suicide prevention organisations.
- Gillian Ruth Hund – For service to charitable organisations.
- Dr Shane Thomas Huntington – For service to science as a communicator.
- Ross Hutchison – For service to the community.
- Mary Julia Hutton – For service to conservation and the environment.
- Giuseppe (Joe) Ienco – For service to the community through charitable and multicultural organisations.
- William David Incoll – For service to the environment, and to the community of the Dandenong Ranges.
- Dr Geoff Lawrence Irvine – For service to the chiropractic profession.
- Elizabeth Irwin – For service to community health.
- Noel Stanley Jackling – For service to the community history.
- Gregory Reginald Jackson – For service to the community of Tasmania.
- Dr Wesley Sidney Jame – For service to community health.
- Pauline James – For service to veterans and their families, and to the community.
- Sandy Jeffs – For service to mental health organisations.
- Tommy Anthony Jeffs – For service to the hospitality industry.
- Dr Joseph Vaughan Johnson, CSC, AAM, RFD, ED – For service to veterans, and to the community.
- Vaughan Gregory Johnson – For service to the people and Parliament of Queensland.
- Caroline Johnston – For service to the community.
- Peter Charles Kahn – For service to community history.
- Major Terry Kanellos (Retd) – For service to veterans and their families, and to the community.
- Julie Keamy – For service to the merino wool industry, and to the community.
- Bronwen Jean Keighery – For service to conservation and the environment.
- Gregory John Keighery – For service to conservation and the environment.
- Peter Kelly – For service to veterans and their families.
- Deborah Kenna – For service to community health.
- Mary Elizabeth Kenneally – For service to the performing arts.
- David Leslie Kerr – For service to the community of Bunbury.
- Russell Humphrey Kerr – For service to education.
- Marvelle Frances Kerslake – For service to the community of Mitchell.
- Vicki Lorraine Key – For service to the community, particularly to emergency response personnel.
- Dorothy Ruth Khoo – For service to the Chinese community of Rockhampton.
- Brigadier Patrick John Kidd (Retd) – For service to sport for people with a disability.
- Richard Louis Kidd – For service to the community of Julimar.
- Bruce Kimberley – For service to cricket.
- Sandra Lorelle King – For service to the Indigenous community.
- Dr Stephen Jeffries King – For service to veterinary science.
- Margaret Knight – For service to veterans, and to community commemorations.
- Marie Knight – For service to people in rural and remote areas.
- Kay Frances Lane – For service to music, and to education.
- Jillian Lange-Mohr – For service to education.
- Rhonda Margaret Langford – For service to music, and to education.
- Dr Thomas William Langston – For service to music, and to the community.
- Diana Betty Laube – For service to conservation and the environment.
- Dr Robert Lavis – For service to the international community through dental programs.
- Dr Morris Arthur Lee – For service to the international community of Bangladesh.
- Murray Stuart Lennon – For service to the community of St Ives.
- Lilian Selina Leonard – For service to community health.
- Dr Liang Joo Leow – For service to medicine, and to the community.
- Christian Lhotka – For service to the community of Widgee.
- Dr Anthony John Lian-Lloyd – For service to medicine, and to the community.
- Peter Liefman – For service to veterans and their families.
- Dr Sadanand Limaye – For service to medicine, and to the multicultural community.
- James Rodham Lindsay – For service to the community of the Macedon Ranges.
- John Lindsay – For service to the community of Wonthaggi.
- Thomas Kelsall Lindsay – For service to the road transport industry, and to the community.
- John Mitchell Little – For service to the community of the Barossa Valley.
- Sarah Jane Lloyd – For service to conservation and the environment.
- John Lo Piccolo – For service to the performing arts.
- Alan Claude Locke – For service to the community through charitable organisations.
- Diane Margaret Lopez – For service to local government, and to the community of Brighton.
- Rafaela Lopez – For service to the Hispanic community of Victoria.
- June Annette Lowe – For service to the Indigenous community of the Illawarra.
- Matthew Alan Luther – For service to nursing.
- John Francis Lynch – For service to the community through emergency response organisations.
- Russell John Magee – For service to the museums and galleries sector.
- Patrice Rene Mahoney – For service to the Indigenous community of Victoria.
- Diana Mahony – For service to the community through charitable initiatives.
- Richard Treacy Mailey – For service to the community through emergency response organisations.
- Colleen Mandicos – For service to aged welfare.
- Peter Maniscalco – For service to the Italian community of Hunters Hill.
- Colin George Mann – For service to aged welfare.
- Michael Mannington – For service to the community through a range of organisations.
- Nicholas James Marchesi – For service to people experiencing homelessness.
- Jim Ian Markovski – For service to youth.
- Dr David John Marshall – For service to orthopaedic medicine.
- Gail Elizabeth Marshall – For service to the community through charitable initiatives.
- Edward Leigh Maughan – For service to rugby league.
- Kenneth Barrett McAllister – For service to the community through emergency response organisations.
- Helen Susanne McCaffrey – For service to local government, and to the community of Canada Bay.
- Roger Wilfrid McCauley – For service to the Uniting Church in Australia, and to the community.
- John Leslie McCoy – For service to the broadcast media, and to the community.
- Sally Anne McCutchan – For service to the community through ethical investment organisations.
- Peter John McDermott – For service to the transport and tourism sectors.
- Michael Joseph McDonald – For service to surf lifesaving.
- The late Carolyn Narelle McDowall – For service to the decorative arts, and to the community.
- Anne McEwen – For service to the Parliament of Australia, and to the community of South Australia.
- Barry Patrick McFarlane – For service to cricket.
- Dianne Joy McGrath – For service to international humanitarian programs, and to the community of Ballarat.
- Duncan Alexander McInnes – For service to agricultural show societies, to the dairy industry, and to the community.
- Kenneth Ray McIntyre – For service to veterans and their families.
- Yvonne McKerrow Jennings – For service to the community of the Swan Hill region.
- Dr Jennifer Ann McMahon – For service to education, and to sport.
- Janelle Mary McMillan – For service to the community through charitable fundraising initiatives.
- Bridget Noreen McNamara – For service to the community of Shepparton.
- Andrea Joy McNeil – For service to swimming.
- Peter Charles McPhee – For service to youth, and to the community.
- Leslie Thomas Meiklejohn – For service to local government, and to the community of Warwick.
- Naim Melhem – For service to the community through a range of roles.
- Pastor Lance Gregory Mergard – For service to the community through social welfare organisations.
- The late Andrew John (Hank) Middleton – For service to Australian rules football in South Australia.
- Dr Sarah Lavinia Midgley – For service to the LGBTIQ community.
- Catherine Anne Milgate – For service to the community through a range of roles.
- Janette May Miller – For service to people who are blind or have low vision.
- Lawrence Harvey Miller – For service to the community of Geelong.
- John Douglas Mills – For service to the community of Nambucca Heads.
- Evelyn Missen – For service to youth, and to the community.
- Susan Jennifer (Jenny) Mitchell – For service to refugees, and to the community.
- William John Mitchell – For service to the law in Queensland.
- Miss Cheryl Lynette Moggs – For service to the Indigenous community of Goondiwindi.
- John Stephen Molnar – For service to charitable organisations.
- Gerald Clive Moore – For service to the Indigenous community.
- Mark Anthony Morrison – For service to vocational education, and to the community.
- Monica Hilary Morse – For service to local government, and to the community of Bathurst.
- Daliah Moss – For service to international eye health programs, and to professional organisations.
- Heather Motteram – For service to the community through a range of roles.
- Elizabeth Macdonald Mourik – For service to education, and to the community.
- Barbara Janine Mullan – For service to the creative arts.
- Neil Mullard – For service to the community of Uraidla.
- Kate Mulvany – For service to the performing arts.
- Jodee Paula Mundy – For service to the performing arts.
- Rosalind Kaye Murree-Allen – For service to the community of Newcastle.
- Glenn Elliott Muskett – For service to aged welfare.
- Dr Gunvantrai Premji Naker – For service to the international community, and to medicine.
- Sandra Kimlin Navalli – For service to international education.
- Cheung Yin Ng – For service to the Chinese community of Victoria.
- Phillip Wai-Shing Ng – For service to Chinese language education, and to the community.
- Dr Meng Chong Ngu – For service to medicine in the fields of gastroenterology and hepatology.
- James Ingle Nicholson – For service to the community of Tasmania.
- Elizabeth Nield – For service to the performing and visual arts.
- Lloyd Alwyn Nielsen – For service to conservation and the environment.
- Deborah Mary Niland – For service to children's literature.
- Maree Therese Nutt – For service to the international community through poverty eradication organisations.
- The Reverend Beth O'Neill – For service to the community of Blackall.
- Catherine Marie-Claire Oelrichs – For service to the international community of Indonesia.
- Margaret Owen – For service to conservation and the environment.
- Marlene Joy Owen – For service to the community of Gympie.
- Meryl Joy Packer – For service to the Lutheran Church of Australia.
- Rex William Packer – For service to the Lutheran Church of Australia.
- Maxwell Arthur Page – For service to the performing arts in Western Australia.
- Raymond Ernest Palmer – For service to the community of Epping.
- Dr Stephen George Papas – For service to the community, and to dentistry.
- Associate Professor Maria Parappilly – For service to science education, and to women.
- Lucas Brooke Patchett – For service to people experiencing homelessness.
- Ian Mead Paterson – For service to the community of Tasmania.
- Andrew Guy Peake – For service to community history.
- Margaret Rose Pearce – For service to the community of East Gosford.
- Anthony Lester Pearson – For service to youth, and to the community of Gosford.
- Ian Kenneth Penny – For service to the community of Warracknabeal.
- Armando Percuoco – For service to the community, and to the restaurant industry.
- The late Boniface Pirrimngip Perdjert – For service to the Catholic Church, and to the community.
- Wasantha Premalal Perera – For service to the Sri Lankan community of Victoria, and to engineering.
- John Winter Pickup – For service to the community as a regional radio broadcaster.
- Rosemary Plummer – For service to the Indigenous community of the Northern Territory.
- Trevor Plymin – For service to veterans and their families.
- Nigel James Porteous – For service to the community, and to the shipping transport industry.
- The late Ken Murray Potts – For service to Australian rules football, and to the community.
- Patricia Lorraine Powell – For service to people who are homeless.
- Mal Pratt – For service to surf lifesaving.
- Margaret Ellen Primmer – For service to women, and to the community.
- Donna Faye Prytulak – For service to veterans and their families.
- Derek Peter Pugh – For service to education in the Northern Territory.
- Craig Robert Purdam – For service to sports administration, and to physiotherapy.
- Dr Christopher John Quinn – For service to research science in the field of plant systemics.
- Marjorie Anne Quinn – For service to the community through a range of roles.
- John Graham Rae – For service to the community of Portarlington.
- Michael Benjamin Rahilly – For service to sport for people with a disability.
- Edward Peter Ralston – For service to sport for people who are blind or have low vision.
- Sylvia Shirley Ramsden – For service to the community of Lilydale.
- Joanna Helen Randell – For service to the community through music.
- Ronald Kenneth Ray – For service to the community through a range of roles.
- Carl John Rayner – For service to conservation and the environment.
- Karen Jeanne Redman – For service to music through concert bands.
- Nerida Constance Reid – For service to the community of Hay.
- Annette Gay (Honi) Reifler – For service to community health.
- Jean-Pierre Reifler – For service to community health.
- Jose Relunia – For service to the Filipino community of New South Wales.
- Seri Franceys Renkin – For service to the community through charitable organisations.
- Douglas Alan Renshaw – For service to the community of Bicheno.
- John Restuccia – For service to surf lifesaving.
- Nicholas John Roberts – For service to the community of Mount Martha.
- Graeme John Robertson – For service to the community of Kulin.
- Rebekah Sarah Robertson – For service to the trans and gender diverse community.
- Kerry A Robinson – For service to local government, and to town planning.
- Dr Andrew Kenneth Rollond – For service to medicine, and to local government.
- William Henry Romans – For service to the communities of Mansfield and Bonnie Doon.
- Dr Kim Frances Rooney – For service to medicine.
- Valerie Mary Rooney – For service to war widows, and to the community of Logan.
- Ronald Rosenberg – For service to veterans, and to the community.
- Brian Stephen Rosengarten – For service to community health.
- The Reverend Albert William Rosier – For service to the Uniting Church of Australia, and to the community.
- Bradley John Rossiter – For service to community of the Eurobodalla.
- Tamara Eve (Timmy) Rubin – For service to the Jewish community of Melbourne.
- Adrian John Rumore – For service to homeless youth, and to physiotherapy.
- Geraldine Noreen Ryan – For service to Irish dancing.
- Julie Ryan – For service to secondary education.
- Patricia Noeline Sabine – For service to the museums and galleries sector.
- Wendy Anne Saclier – For service to the creative arts, and to women.
- Michael Francis Said – For service to accountancy, and to public sector governance.
- Dennis Eric Sales – For service to tennis.
- Judith Anne Sammut – For service to community health.
- Tomas Santamaria – For service to volleyball.
- Barbara Elaine Sax – For service to the community.
- Gary Schulz – For service to education, and to the community.
- Eric Ronald Scott – For service to the performing arts in Queensland.
- Katrina Anne-Marie Sedgwick – For service to performing, screen, and visual arts administration.
- Robert Peter Selinger – For service to the community, and to education.
- Terence William Shannon – For service to the community.
- Sam Michal Sharman – For service to the Jewish community of Melbourne.
- Paul John Signorelli – For service to the hospitality sector, and to the community.
- Catherine Mary Simmonds – For service to the performing arts.
- Dr Meg Simmons – For service to oral health in outback communities.
- Sheila Ellen Simpson – For service to nursing.
- Inderjit (Indy) Singh – For service to the international community through eye care programs.
- Professor Sarva-Daman Singh – For service to tertiary education, and to the community.
- Lesley Grace Slater – For service to people with a disability.
- Malcolm George Small – For service to youth, and to veterans.
- Barry Ronald Smith – For service to local government, and to the community of Hunters Hill.
- Reginald Norman Smith – For service to youth through intercultural programs.
- Suzanne Sofarnos – For service to lacrosse.
- Dr Samiul Joseph Sorrenti – For service to orthopaedic and sports medicine.
- Gregory Owen Speed – For service to the community through emergency response organisations.
- Judith Anne Speedy – For service to the community of Mirboo North.
- Dr John Stanisic – For service to conservation and the environment.
- Suzanne Stanley – For service to sport, and to the community.
- Arthur Joseph Stanton – For service to veterans and their families.
- The Hon. Roger Michael Steele – For service to the people and Legislative Assembly of the Northern Territory.
- Paul Michael Stewart – For service to the community, and to the performing arts.
- John Stewart Stoddart – For service to the performing arts as a designer.
- Peter Telford Stoker – For service to the mining sector.
- Georgie Robertson Stone – For service to the trans and gender diverse community.
- Jan Sutherland – For service to sport in South Australia.
- Khalil Tartak – For service to the Lebanese community of New South Wales.
- Nenia Helen Tavrou – For service to the community through a range of roles.
- Brian Keith Taylor – For service to rural and remote communities, and as an author.
- Allan Garry Tennent – For service to the community through emergency response organisations.
- Patrick Daniel Tessier – For service to charitable organisations.
- Gillian Thomas – For service to community health, particularly to people with polio.
- Janet Iris Thomas – For service to youth through the Girls Brigade.
- Anthony James Thompson – For service to the community of Marysville.
- Christine Irene Thompson – For service to local government, and to the community of the Murray shire.
- Murray Hamilton Thompson – For service to the people and Parliament of Victoria.
- John Charles Thornton – For service to the performing arts, and to the community.
- Leslie John Threlfo ESM – For service to the community through emergency response organisations.
- Phillip Anthony Titterton – For service to rowing.
- Robert Charles Titterton – For service to music through orchestras and ensembles.
- Kate Torney – For service to the broadcast media, and to the cultural sector.
- Malcolm John Towle – For service to the community through emergency response organisations.
- Dr Mark Tredinnick – For service to literature, and to education.
- Alfred Robert Tregear – For service to Australian rules football.
- The Reverend Father Christos Triandafyllou – For service to the Greek Orthodox community of Belmore.
- Dr Andrew James Tridgell – For service to information technology.
- Jane Turner – For service to the performing arts as a writer, actor and comedian.
- The Reverend Dr Jennifer Gibson Turner – For service to the Baptist Church, and to Churches of Christ.
- Vernon Joseph Turner – For service to hockey.
- Dr Robin Katherine Uppill – For service to orienteering.
- David Van Nunen – For service to the visual arts.
- The late Daniele Velcich – For service to the Italian and Croatian communities of Blacktown.
- Dorothy Fay Vickery – For service to local government, and to the community of Guyra.
- Adam Charles Voges – For service to cricket.
- Joan Rosemary von Bibra – For service to education, and to professional organisations.
- Peter James Wallace – For service to education, and to the community.
- Peter James Walsh – For service to the Catholic Church in Victoria, and to business.
- Robert Richard Walton – For service to education, and to the community.
- William George Warburton – For service to the community of Tamworth.
- John Sydney Wareham – For service to aged welfare, and to the community.
- The late Jacqueline Warner – For service to youth through Scouts.
- Vicki Warren – For service to softball, and to hockey.
- Esther Meryl Watson – For service to the community of the Dandenong Ranges.
- Pastor Francis James Watson – For service to the community of the Dandenong Ranges.
- Jocelyn Yvonne Watson – For service to the community of Launceston.
- Miss Beverley (Jean) Weaver – For service to conservation and the environment, and to the community.
- Christopher John Webb – For service to horticulture, particularly through botanic gardens.
- Emma Webb – For service to the performing arts, particularly in Port Adelaide.
- David George Weil – For service to the community through a range of roles.
- Garry Keith Wellington – For service to veterans and their families.
- Olive Wellington – For service to the community of Hopetoun.
- Adira Yael Werdiger – For service to the Jewish community of Victoria.
- Dr John Milton Wettenhall – For service to the international community through water, sanitation and medical programs.
- Edmund John Wheeler – For service to the community through road safety initiatives.
- Alan William Whimp – For service to people with a disability and their carers.
- Tanya Maree Whitehouse – For service to the community through social welfare initiatives.
- Robert John Wildermuth – For service to the building and construction industry.
- Graeme Roy Williams – For service to local government, and to the community of the Strathbogie shire.
- Gregory Wayne Williams – For service to public administration in Queensland.
- Dr Peter George Williams – For service to community health, and to medical education.
- Peter John Williams – For service to maritime history.
- Dr Treve Williams – For service to veterinary science.
- Bruce Anthony Wilson – For service to conservation and the environment.
- Edwin James Wilson – For service to the visual arts, and to the community.
- Elizabeth Wilson – For service to the community of Lang Lang.
- Michael John Wilson – For service to community health, particularly to diabetes research.
- Paul Clifford Wilson – For service to the community of Oatlands.
- Guy Alan Winship – For service to the community through social welfare organisations.
- Julie Womersley – For service to lawn bowls.
- Neville Womersley – For service to lawn bowls.
- Carole Joy Woods – For service to community history.
- Dr David Workman – For service to ophthalmology, and to international relations.
- Professor Clare Alice Wright – For service to literature, and to historical research.
- Wei Quan Xu – For service to the Chinese community of Melbourne, and to football.
- Lexie Eileen Young – For service to the community of Deloraine.
- James Siang-Chung Yu – For service to the Chinese community of New South Wales.
- Manfred John Zabinskas – For service to animal welfare.
- Irena Antonina Zdanowicz – For service to the visual arts as a curator.
- Michael John Zekulich – For service to print journalism, and as an author.
- Eleftheria (Victoria) Zografos – For service to the multicultural community of Queensland.
- Toufic Thomas Saadeldine Zreika – For service to the community, to local government, and to the law.

==== Military Division ====
- Warrant Officer Class One Joshua Paul Andrews – For meritorious service in achievement and exceptional commitment to the continuous advancement of Army's Geospatial Intelligence capability.
- Chief Petty Officer Raechelle Nadine Henderson – For meritorious service in leadership, and advancement of the service as a Naval Police Coxswain.
- Captain John Thomas Land – For meritorious service as the Army Conservator, Australian Army History Unit, in support of the protection of Army's heritage.
- Warrant Officer Class One Brian Geoffrey Moore – For meritorious performance of duty in personnel management, instructional leadership, executive events coordination, and ceremonial event management in the Australian Defence Force.
- Warrant Officer Anthony Donald O'Riley – For meritorious service to improving the capability levels and wellbeing of Navy Submarine Force People.
- Warrant Officer Class One Roger John Read – For meritorious service as the Information Systems Engineer, Force Installation Team 31 from 2017 to 2019.
- Warrant Officer Class One Andrew Peter Shore, CSM – For meritorious service as the Regimental Sergeant Major of the 3rd Battalion, the Royal Australian Regiment; and the Royal Military College - Duntroon, and as a Career Advisor in the Directorate of Soldier Career Management - Army.
- Commander Richard John Singleton, CSM, RAN – For meritorious service to the Australian Defence Force in the fields of exercise and operational planning and the introduction into service of naval capabilities.
- Commander Benjamin Brian Spurgin, RAN – For meritorious performance of duty as a Navy Legal Advisor and instructor.
- Warrant Officer Rudolf William Vitasz – For meritorious service to the Australian Defence Force in leadership and cultural development.
- Warrant Officer Class One Julie Anne Whittaker – For meritorious service as the Senior Technical Trade Warrant Officer and Career Advisor for Army Ammunition Technicians.
- Warrant Officer Benjamin Robert Wright – For meritorious service in personnel recognition administration, major public relations initiatives, and organisational development in the Royal Australian Air Force.

==== Honorary ====
- Helen Patricia Oxenham – For service to the community through social welfare initiatives and advocacy.
- Brenda Jean Rayner – For service to music.
- Fay Patricia Richards – For service to people with a disability.
- Dr Chaoyi Wei – For service to international relations.

== Meritorius Service ==
=== Public Service Medal (PSM) ===
Public Service Medal ribbon

Federal

- Nguyen Thi Thanh An – For outstanding public service in fostering the Australia-Vietnam bilateral relationship in agricultural research.
- Karen Jacqueline Binnekamp – For outstanding public service to health, particularly through improvements to listings on the Pharmaceutical Benefits Scheme, and subsidy of breakthrough medical treatments.
- Penny Damianakis – For outstanding public service through leading the provision of Centrelink services to vulnerable customers and refugee communities.
- Michael James Druce – For outstanding public service to nuclear medicine production.
- David Roland Fredericks – For outstanding public service through supporting the Government in achieving fiscal and budget policy objectives, and significant reforms in the Attorney-General's Department.
- Associate Professor Matthew Roland Hill – For outstanding public service to materials development for industry and the Australian Defence Force.
- Dr Dale Austin Lambert – For outstanding public service in the use of artificial intelligence in surveillance and reconnaissance, command and control, intelligence and autonomous platforms.
- Dr Adam Lewis – For outstanding public service through the application of geospatial information.
- Helen Maree McDevitt – For outstanding public service through social policy innovation to improve the lives of disadvantaged Australians, particularly young persons and people with a disability.
- Mark Patrick O'Connell – For outstanding public service through leading engagement with communities affected by PFAS contamination from legacy Defence firefighting activities.
- Nico Padovan – For outstanding public service in program and policy delivery, including supporting the recovery and reconstruction of the livestock industry in North Queensland.
- Julie Anne Roberts – For outstanding public service through exceptional delivery of executive support services to the national security community.
- Dr Albin Frank Smrdel – For outstanding public service in reforming the corporate arrangements of the federal courts, and structural reform for the Australian family courts system.
- Robert Sturgiss – For outstanding public service through the development of a world class inventory for greenhouse gases, and to accurate measuring and reporting of emissions for Australian companies.
- Damian John Voltz – For outstanding public service through efforts to protect Australian sport from the threat of match-fixing, corruption and criminal exploitation.
- Lesley Watson – For outstanding public service through contributions to agency organisation and functioning, and to Australia's national security.

New South Wales

- Christopher Mark Beatson – For outstanding public service to the New South Wales Police Force.
- Wilma Falcone – For outstanding public service to the social housing sector in New South Wales.
- Mark David Grant – For outstanding public service to education in New South Wales.
- Pippinella Wheatcroft Job – For outstanding public service to drought affected communities in New South Wales.
- Ronald Fredrick Kemsley – For outstanding public service to environmental rehabilitation in the Kempsey Shire.
- Annette Elizabeth Moehead, OAM – For outstanding public service to mental health care of aged persons in New South Wales.
- Dr Victor Hutton Oddy – For outstanding public service to the primary industry sector, and to science, in New South Wales.
- Donna Osland – For outstanding public service to public programs at the Royal Botanic Gardens, Sydney.
- Raymond John Smith – For outstanding public service to local government in New South Wales.
- Vicki Telfer – For outstanding public service to industrial relations policy and reform in New South Wales.
- Katherine Ruth Tollner – For the outstanding public service to people with a disability in New South Wales.

Victoria

- Professor Stephen Moile Cordner, AM – For outstanding public service to forensic medical and scientific services, training and research in Victoria.
- Shelagh Donegan-Bragg – For outstanding public service to education, and to people with a disability, in Victoria.
- Noelene Duff – For outstanding public service to local government in Victoria.
- Christine Michelle Ferguson – For outstanding public service to policy and program delivery in Victoria.
- Miss Reegan Odette Key – For outstanding public service to emergency management systems in Victoria.
- Gabrielle Hedwig Levine – For outstanding public service to community safety projects in Victoria.
- Dr James Richard Pearson – For outstanding public service to forensic science, particularly to chemistry, in Victoria.
- Janine Louise Toomey – For outstanding public service to policy design and service delivery in Victoria.

Queensland

- Colin Brian Cassidy – For outstanding public service to economic development, corporate services and town planning in Queensland.
- Clare Frances Douglas – For outstanding public service to health administration in Queensland.
- Maureen Elaine Ervine – For outstanding public service to Indigenous families and communities in Queensland.
- Julie Etchells – For outstanding public service to children and families in Queensland.
- Helen Francis Ferguson – For outstanding public service to social policy development and implementation in Queensland.
- Michael Dermot Parker – For outstanding public service to local government administration in Queensland.
- Janelle Sue Thurlby – For outstanding public service to financial management and planning in Queensland.

South Australia

- Jan Marie Cornish – For outstanding public service to asset management in local government in South Australia.
- Professor Edward (Ted) Tuckseng Mah – For outstanding public service to public health in South Australia.
- Deborah Pearce – For outstanding public service to people with a disability, and to South Australia Police.

Western Australia

- Pauline Bagdonavicius – For outstanding public service, particularly through advocacy roles in Western Australia.
- Noelene Rae Jennings – For outstanding public service, particularly to local government in Western Australia.
- Lee Musumeci – For outstanding public service to early childhood education in Western Australia.

Australian Capital Territory

- George Abram Cilliers – For outstanding public service to planning and development in the Australian Capital Territory.
- John Desmond Purcell – For outstanding public service to federal financial relations, and to the development of self-government in the Australian Capital Territory.

Northern Territory

- Kenneth Lindsay Davies – For outstanding public service to children and families in the Northern Territory.
- Gregory John Shanahan – For outstanding public service to the justice system in the Northern Territory.

=== Australian Police Medal (APM) ===
Australian Police Medal ribbon

Australian Federal Police

- Assistant Commissioner Lesa Jane Gale
- Superintendent Jared Gordon Taggart
- Detective Superintendent Danielle Anne Woodward, OAM

New South Wales Police Force

- Detective Chief Inspector Robert Mark Allison
- Detective Superintendent Anthony John Cooke
- Detective Superintendent David Caldwell Darcy
- Detective Superintendent Kerrie Anne Lewis
- Detective Superintendent Peter James McKenna
- Sergeant John Francis Rayment
- Superintendent Daniel Edward Sullivan
- Detective Superintendent Gavin Kendall Wood

Victoria Police

- Detective Superintendent Peter John Brigham
- Detective Senior Sergeant Mark William Chrystie
- Leading Senior Constable Andrew Neil Downes
- Superintendent David Owen Jones
- Commander Elizabeth Anne Murphy
- Leading Senior Constable Patrick Joseph Storer

Queensland Police Service

- Inspector Corey Mathew Allen
- Detective Senior Sergeant Michelle Therese Clark
- Detective Senior Sergeant Sasha Naomi Finney
- Superintendent Craig Andrew Hanlon
- Chief Superintendent Mark Patrick Wheeler
- Inspector Nyree Lona Whelan

South Australia Police

- Detective Sergeant Bernard Joseph Farrington
- Senior Sergeant First Class Tracy McLeod Gentgall
- Detective Sergeant David Paul Hunt

Western Australia Police

- Deputy Commissioner Colin John Blanch
- Superintendent Dario Adriano Bolzonella
- Senior Constable Michelle Deborah Jesney
- Sergeant David John Johnson

Tasmania Police

- Detective Senior Constable Sharee Simone Maksimovic
- Commander Ian John Whish-Wilson

Northern Territory Police

- Superintendent Antony Stuart Deutrom

=== Australian Fire Service Medal (AFSM) ===
Australian Fire Service Medal ribbon

New South Wales

- John William Bevan
- Brett Davies
- Christopher Charles Goff
- Robert James Graham
- Raymond Randolf Hill
- Dawn Caroline Maynard
- John Wayne Stuckings
- Michelle Janine Thornley
- Owen Leonard Tydd
- Graham Clifford Williams

Victoria

- Gregory Francis Hitch
- George Ernest O'Dwyer
- Graeme John Saunder
- Peter John Shaw

Queensland

- Steven John Barber
- Gregory Raymond Duncan
- Patrick Ross Kraut
- Bevan James Love
- Rodger (John) Sambrooks

South Australia

- Kenneth Campbell
- Shane Mark Heffernan
- Samual John Sanderson
- Dennis Robert Taylor

Western Australia

- Mark David Bowen
- Dr Neil Douglas Burrows
- Richard Dennis Lawrey

Tasmania

- Mark Henry McDermott

Australian Capital Territory

- Stephen James Angus
- Russell Edward Goodall

Northern Territory

- Craig Andrew Slack

=== Ambulance Service Medal (ASM) ===
Ambulance Service Medal ribbon

New South Wales

- Clare Louise Beech
- Michael John Bray

Victoria

- William Allan Briggs
- Rain Histen
- Terrence Patrick Marshall
- Gail Sharp
- Lance Francis Simmons
- Susan Jane Walsh
- Kenneth John Whittle

Queensland

- Tracey Anne Eastwick
- Wayne William Sachs
- Cary Strong

South Australia

- David Mark Jaensch

Western Australia

- Christopher Bradley Oakes
- David Saunders
- Austin Shannon Whiteside

Tasmania

- Lorraine Joy Gardiner
- Han-Wei Lee

=== Emergency Services Medal (ESM) ===
Emergency Services Medal ribbon

New South Wales

- Allison May Flaxman
- Richard (John) Rooke
- Warren Noel Turner

Victoria

- John William Hooper

South Australia

- Maxwell John Coulson

Western Australia

- Ronald Francis McPherson

Tasmania

- William James Folder
- Vincent Holthouse
- Neil Gerard Van Veldhuizen

Australian Capital Territory

- Mubin Shareef Khokhar

=== Australian Corrections Medal (ACM) ===
Australian Corrections Medal ribbon

New South Wales

- Jean Elizabeth Dally
- Miss Rebecca Joy Edwards
- Amandeep Singh
- Albert William Torrens

Victoria

- Stephen Cadman
- Steven Douglas Comte
- Tina Filopoulos
- Stephen Peter Payne

Queensland

- Robyn Margaret Ernst
- Simone Elizabeth Lourigan
- Jenny Lee Lynas

South Australia

- Susan Jane Dighton
- Bernard John Gelston

Western Australia

- Samuel James Dinah
- Cassandra Lee Gilbert
- Benjamin Richard Leadbeatter
- Gregory Peter Little
- Leith Thomas

Tasmania

- Elizabeth Moore

Australian Capital Territory

- Jason Paul Stockheim

== Distinguished and Conspicuous Service ==
=== Bar to the Distinguished Service Cross (DSC and Bar) ===
Distinguished Service Cross & Bar ribbon

Army

- Brigadier John William Shanahan, DSC, AM, OBE – For distinguished command and leadership in warlike operations as the North Atlantic Treaty Organisation Resolute Support Headquarters Chief of Operations and as the Commanding General Train Advise Assist Command – South in Afghanistan from September 2017 to February 2019.

=== Distinguished Service Cross (DSC) ===
Distinguished Service Cross ribbon

Navy

- Rear Admiral Jaimie Charles Frank Hatcher, AM, RAN – For distinguished command and leadership in warlike operations as the Commander Joint Task Force 633 on Operations OKRA and HIGHROAD from January 2018 to January 2019.

Army

- Lieutenant Colonel R – For distinguished command and leadership in warlike operations while deployed as the Commander of a Special Operations Task Group in Iraq from June to December 2018.
- Colonel Michael Andrew Say – For distinguished command and leadership in warlike operations while deployed as the Commander of Task Group Taji VII in Iraq during 2018.

=== Distinguished Service Medal (DSM) ===
Distinguished Service Medal ribbon

Army

- Bombardier Michael Richard Cobb – For distinguished leadership in warlike operations as the Australian Counter Unmanned Aerial Systems Detachment Commander within Headquarters Joint Task Force 633, whilst deployed to the Middle East Region from October 2017 to June 2018.
- Colonel Stuart Nicholas Kenny, CSC – For distinguished leadership in warlike operations as the Chief of Plans for Train, Advise, Assist Command – South, Operation RESOLUTE SUPPORT, Afghanistan from January 2018 to January 2019.

=== Commendation for Distinguished Service ===
Commendation for Distinguished Service ribbon

Army

- Colonel B – For distinguished performance of duties in warlike operations as the Director Strategy and Plans, Headquarters Combined Joint Task Force – Operation INHERENT RESOLVE from January to September 2018.
- Brigadier Peter James Connor, AM – For distinguished performance of duties in warlike operations as the Commander of Task Group Afghanistan while deployed on Operation HIGHROAD from November 2017 to September 2018.
- Captain D – For distinguished performance of duties in warlike operations as the Executive Officer and Operations Officer for a Special Operations Task Group whilst deployed to Iraq on Operation OKRA in 2018.
- Corporal Daniel David Flynn – For distinguished performance of duties in warlike operations as the Force Protection Section Commander of the Train Advise Assist Command – Air mission in Afghanistan from August 2018 to February 2019.
- Colonel Stephen John Gliddon, AM – For distinguished performance of duties in warlike operations as the Chief of Future Operations, North Atlantic Treaty Organisation Resolute Support Mission, Afghanistan from November 2017 to January 2019.
- Major Joshua Eden Higgins – For distinguished performance of duties in warlike operations as the Officer Commanding Training Team Victor, Task Group Taji Seven in Iraq from May to November 2018.
- Corporal Lachlan Thomas Mitchell – For distinguished performance of duties in warlike operations as a Force Protection Section Commander for Train Advise Assist Command – Air, Afghanistan whilst assigned to Operation HIGHROAD from February to August 2018.
- Colonel Gavin Andrew Stanford, CSC – For distinguished performance of duties in warlike operations as the Chief of Future Operations within the Operations Directorate of Headquarters Combined Joint Task Force – Operation INHERENT RESOLVE from November 2017 to November 2018.
- Brigadier Wade Bradley Stothart, DSC, AM, CSC – For distinguished performance of duties in warlike operations as the Director Joint Plans and Assessment within the Headquarters Combined Joint Task Force – Operation INHERENT RESOLVE from December 2017 to December 2018.

Navy

- Captain Sands Niall Skinner RAN – For distinguished performance of duties in warlike operations as the Aircraft Maintenance and Engineering Branch Chief within the North Atlantic Treaty Organisation Resolute Support Train Advise Assist Command – Air on Operation HIGHROAD from July 2018 to February 2019.

Air Force

- Flight Lieutenant Brendon Scott Carraro – For distinguished performance of duties in warlike operations as Pilot in Command of MAMBO21, a Royal Australian Air Force C-130J-30, on 7 August 2017 whilst deployed on Operation OKRA.

=== Conspicuous Service Cross (CSC) ===
Conspicuous Service Cross ribbon

Army

- Colonel Michael Rodney Ahern – For outstanding devotion to duty as Commander Australian Contingent, Operation ASLAN and Senior Military Liaison Officer for Juba within the United Nations Mission in South Sudan from June 2018 to January 2019.
- Lieutenant Colonel Glen Allan Billington – For outstanding achievement as the Commanding Officer and Chief Engineer of the 19th Chief Engineer Works.
- Lieutenant Colonel Darryl Robert Bridgeman – For outstanding devotion to duty as Commander Australian Contingent, Operation PALADIN, United Nations Truce Supervision Organisation (Israel and Syria) from October 2017 to October 2018.
- Major Cassandra Campbell – For outstanding devotion to duty as the senior career advisor of the Royal Australian Corps of Signals, Directorate of Soldier Career Management – Army.
- Lieutenant Colonel Judd Andrew Finger – For outstanding devotion to duty as Commander Joint Task Group 629 on Operation AUGURY from February 2018 to October 2018.
- Lieutenant Colonel Dianne Grey – For outstanding achievement in the application of exceptional skills, judgement and dedication in the advancement of intelligence collection, analysis and assessment within the Australian Defence Force.
- Lieutenant Colonel Stuart James Hill – For outstanding achievement as the Staff Officer Cyber Security and Commanding Officer Defence Security Operations Centre over the period 2013 to 2018.
- Lieutenant Colonel Brendan Mark Hogan – For outstanding achievement as Staff Officer Grade One Land Range Safety, Combined Arms Training Centre.
- Lieutenant Colonel L – For outstanding devotion to duty as the Command Legal Officer within Special Operations Command.
- Lieutenant Colonel James Michael Bain Smith – For outstanding devotion to duty as Commander Australian Contingent and Chief of Operations, Operation MAZURKA, Multinational Force and Observers Mission, Sinai, Egypt from February 2018 to February 2019.

Navy

- Captain Michael Bruce Devine RAN – For outstanding achievement in the application of judgement as Commander Task Unit 641.1.1 and Commanding Officer HMAS Anzac in the tactical planning and execution of Maritime South East Asia Deployment from March to June 2018.
- Commander Bronwyn Adele Ferrier CSM, RAN – For outstanding achievement in the management of occupational hygiene and environmental hazards in the Royal Australian Navy.
- Captain Daniel John Leraye RAN – For outstanding devotion to duty as the inaugural Class Lifecycle Engineering Officer in Collins Class submarines.
- Commander Jennifer Louise Macklin RAN – For outstanding achievement in the promotion of diversity and inclusion in the Royal Australian Navy.
- Captain Anthony Bruce Miskelly RAN – For outstanding devotion to duty during the introduction into service of HMAS Hobart.
- Warrant Officer Christopher John Rowley – For outstanding achievement and dedication in his leadership of the Royal Australian Navy technical workforce.
- Commander Anita Louise Sellick CSM, RAN – For outstanding achievement as Commanding Officer of HMAS Newcastle.
- Commander Darlene Maree Williams RAN – For outstanding achievement in strategic organisational development as Military Assistant to the Chief of Joint Capabilities in the Australian Defence Force.

Air Force

- Squadron Leader Janine Marie Fetchik – For outstanding achievement in the provision of legal services to the Royal Australian Air Force.
- Squadron Leader Duncan John Flemington – For outstanding devotion to duty as the Commander of the Joint Task Force 639 Air Component Coordination Element during Operation RESOLUTE from January 2016 to December 2018.
- Squadron Leader Clare Kathleen Fry – For outstanding achievement in aircrew human factors performance management and air safety accident investigation for the Australian Defence Force.
- Sergeant William Booth Gill – For outstanding achievements in unmanned aerial system capability enhancement in the Royal Australian Air Force.
- Squadron Leader Sean Andrew Hamilton – For outstanding achievement in fighter aircraft tactics development and training in the Royal Australian Air Force.
- Wing Commander Matthew John Harper, DSM – For outstanding achievement in air combat capability management for the Australian Defence Force.
- Squadron Leader Craig Geoffrey Keane – For outstanding devotion to duty in AP-3C aircraft electronic warfare capability development for the Australian Defence Force.
- Sergeant Benjamin John Mason – For outstanding achievement in E-7A Wedgetail aircraft communications information systems and security support for the Australian Defence Force.

=== Conspicuous Service Medal (CSM) ===
Conspicuous Service Medal ribbon

Army

- Sergeant Dayne Robert Anderson – For meritorious achievement in developing virtual training systems integrated with existing live, virtual and constructive training that has improved enhanced Australian Army training methods and assisted the capability of international partners.
- Warrant Officer Class One Craig Cutts – For meritorious devotion to duty in administrative and logistic support to Australian Defence Force operations and training assistance in the Republic of the Philippines.
- Warrant Officer Class Two Michael John Dixon – For meritorious achievement as the Squadron Sergeant Major at the 171st Special Operations Aviation Squadron, 6th Aviation Regiment from January 2016 to December 2018.
- Warrant Officer Class One Leanne Marie Iseppi, OAM – For meritorious devotion to duty as the Command Warrant Officer, Joint Task Force 633 whilst deployed on Operation ACCORDION from January 2018 to January 2019.
- Colonel Craig Anthony Lauder – For meritorious devotion to duty as the Chief of Staff in Headquarters Joint Task Force 633 on Operation ACCORDION from March 2018 to January 2019.
- Warrant Officer Class One M – For meritorious devotion to duty to the Special Air Service Regiment in the field of Parachute Rigger Supervisor 2008 to 2018.
- Warrant Officer Class Two Desmond Peter McCoy – For meritorious achievement as the Company Sergeant Major of the Land Mobile Training Team under Joint Task Group 629 during Operation AUGURY from January to May 2018.
- Warrant Officer Class One Brad James Millen – For meritorious achievement as the Intelligence Warrant Officer of the 51st Battalion, the Far North Queensland Regiment and the Regional Force Surveillance Group Liaison Officer to the Australian Maritime Border Operations Centre from 2017 to 2018.
- Brigadier Paul Michael Nothard, AM, CSC – For meritorious devotion to duty as the Deputy Commander of Joint Task Force 633 whilst deployed on Operation ACCORDION from November 2017 to August 2018.
- Colonel Simon Clive Palmer – For meritorious achievement in leading cultural change and governance reform within Reserve and Youth Division, Joint Capabilities Group.
- Chaplain Peter Douglas Price – For meritorious achievement as the unit Padre displaying exceptional application of spiritual, pastoral and philosophical care at the Army School of Electrical and Mechanical Engineering.
- Warrant Officer Class One Christopher Robert Ross – For meritorious achievement as the Personnel Operations Warrant Officer, J1 Directorate, Headquarters Joint Operations Command.
- Lieutenant Colonel John Charles Sayers – For meritorious achievement as Commanding Officer of the 2nd Force Support Battalion.
- Lieutenant Colonel Charles Christian Slinger – For meritorious achievement as the Staff Officer Grade One Air and Missile Defence, Combat Support Program, Army Headquarters.

Navy

- Lieutenant Peter Asimakis RAN – For meritorious achievement as a lead member of the Sea Training Unit Defence Cooperation Programme.
- Petty Officer Victoria Ann Clarke – For meritorious devotion to duty in the field of Navy workforce management.
- Lieutenant Commander Bernard Roy Dobson RAN – For meritorious devotion to duty during the introduction into service of HMAS Hobart.
- Chief Petty Officer Melita Leigh English – For meritorious achievement in the performance of duty as the Fleet Legal Assistant.
- Commander Lindsay Ridgway Gordon RAN – For meritorious achievement as the Deputy Director Submarines – Platform.
- Commander Robert (Bradley) Halloran RAN – For meritorious achievement in the field of Navy training systems.
- Leading Seaman N – For meritorious achievement as an Electronic Warfare Instructor within the School of Maritime Warfare.
- Chief Petty Officer Zulkarnain Shah Naim – For meritorious devotion to duty as the Navy Advisor on Inter-Cultural Affairs.
- Lieutenant Commander Steven Geoffrey Taragel RAN – For meritorious achievement as the Executive Officer of HMAS Cairns.

Air Force

- Group Captain Robert John Elliott – For meritorious achievement in leading, planning and delivering critical intelligence, surveillance, reconnaissance and targeting effects for Joint Operations Command.
- Flight Sergeant Tanya Marie Fraser – For meritorious devotion to duty in organisational administration and management as the Administrator for Specialist Legal Reserve Services in the Royal Australian Air Force.
- Wing Commander Kylie Larrisa Green – For meritorious achievement in logistics employment initiatives, operational preparedness, and force generation development for the Royal Australian Air Force.
- Corporal Lachlan Walker O'Kane – For meritorious achievement as the Surveillance Technician in Air Task Group 630.1.4 whilst deployed on Operation OKRA from August 2018 to February 2019.
- Squadron Leader Brayden Joseph Pirlo – For meritorious devotion to duty in development and delivery of the first technical cyber threat intelligence capability for the Australian Defence Force.
- Sergeant Justin Wayne Regan – For meritorious achievement in air surveillance in the Defence Signals Intelligence and Cyber Command.
