= Peter Dunn =

Peter Dunn may refer to:

- Peter Dunn (author) (born 1977), American financial author and radio host
- Peter Dunn (cricketer) (1921–2004), Australian cricketer
- Peter Dunn (engineer) (1927–2014), British engineer
- Peter Dunn (general) (born 1947), Australian general and ACT Emergency Services Commissioner
- Peter Dunn (historian), Australian historian
- Peter Dunn (paediatrician) (1929–2021), British paediatrician
- Peter Dunn (politician) (born 1935), South Australian politician
- Peter Dunn (rugby union) (1936–2019), Australian rugby union player

== See also ==
- Pete Dunn, baseball coach
- Peter Dunne (disambiguation)
