= International Journal of Drug Policy =

- Discipline: Drug policy, addiction medicine
- Language: English
- Edited by: Alison Ritter

Publication details
- Former name(s): Mersey Drugs Journal
- History: 1987–present
- Publisher: Elsevier
- Frequency: Monthly
- Impact factor: 5.009 (2017)

Standard abbreviations
- Bluebook: Int'l. J. Drug Pol'y
- ISO 4: Int. J. Drug Policy

Indexing
- ISSN: 0955-3959 (print); 1873-4758 (web)

Links
- Journal homepage

The International Journal of Drug Policy is a monthly peer-reviewed medical journal covering drug policy with respect to both illegal and legal drugs. It was established in 1987 as the Mersey Drugs Journal, and obtained its current name in 1989 in response to the global interest in the Mersey Drugs Training and Information Centre, after which the journal was originally named. The journal's editor-in-chief is Alison Ritter. According to the Journal Citation Reports, the journal has a 2020 impact factor of 5.009.
