= Alison Ritter =

Alison Ritter AO FASSA

Academic background
- Education: University of Melbourne
- Thesis: The influence of neuropsychological status on response to treatment for alcohol dependence: Coping skills, clinician ratings, self-efficacy and therapist characteristics (1998)

Alison Joan Ritter AO FASSA is an Australian academic whose research focuses on illicit drug use and policy. As of 2021 she is a full professor and director of the Drug Policy Modelling Program at the University of New South Wales.

== Career ==
Ritter graduated from the University of Melbourne in 1988 with a Master of Arts. Her thesis was titled "Coping and relapse in opiate users". She subsequently was awarded a PhD by the same university in 1998 for her thesis, "The influence of neuropsychological status on response to treatment for alcohol dependence: Coping skills, clinician ratings, self-efficacy and therapist characteristics".

From 1987 to 1993 Ritter worked as a clinical psychologist with Victorian Alcohol and Drug Services, before joining the Victorian Department of Human Services as a senior policy officer. From there she was appointed deputy director (1994–2005) of Turning Point Alcohol and Drug Centre in Melbourne. She then moved to Sydney where she has worked as associate professor (2006–2011) then professor (2011–) in the Drug Policy Modelling Program (DPMP) at the University of New South Wales (UNSW). She also served as acting director (2009–2011) and Deputy Director (2013–2018) of the National Drug and Alcohol Research Centre at UNSW.

While at the DPMP, Ritter has contributed to government policy in areas such as the regulation of medicinal cannabis and has participated in reviewing the decriminalisation of personal drug use.

She has served on a number of Australian and international boards, including as president of the Australasian Professional Society on Alcohol & Drugs (2007–2011), vice president of the Alcohol and Drug Council of Australia (2011–2019) and president of the International Society for the Study of Drug Policy (2011–2015). She has been a chief investigator in the National Health and Medical Research Council since 2000 and been a member of its grant review panel. As of 2021 she is editor in chief of the International Journal of Drug Policy.

== Awards and recognition ==
Ritter was appointed an Officer of the Order of Australia in the 2020 Australia Day Honours for "distinguished service to education, to drug and alcohol research and social policy, and to professional medical societies". She was elected a Fellow of the Academy of the Social Sciences in Australia in November 2021.
