= Nancy Bates (journalist) =

New Zealand-Australian journalist and editor

Nancy Bates OAM
- Born: 3 March 1948 (age 78); Katikati, New Zealand
- Occupation: Journalist
- Known for: Second female editor of a daily Australian newspaper

Nancy Dawn Bates OAM (born 3 March 1948) is a New Zealand-born Australian community advocate and retired journalist. She was the second woman to be appointed editor of a daily Australian newspaper, serving as editor of the Fraser Coast Chronicle in Maryborough, Queensland, for 21 years.

== Career ==
Her journalism career began at the age of 16 when she obtained a cadetship with the Bay of Plenty Times in Tauranga. After spending three years at the paper, Bates commenced a three-year stint at Rotorua Daily Post in Rotorua before relocated to Australia in 1970 to take up a position as a general news reporter at the Maryborough Chronicle which later changed its name to the Fraser Coast Chronicle.

Throughout her time at the Fraser Coast Chronicle, Bates worked her way up through the ranks and served as the chief sub-editor and then chief of staff before being appointed as the newspaper's editor in 1988.

Bates is credited with helping the newspaper achieve its highest circulation growth despite the general trend of decreasing circulation.

As editor, Bates also coordinated a project which saw the language of the Butchulla people, the traditional owners of the Fraser Coast, incorporated into the newspaper.

After almost 40 years with the same newspaper, Bates retired from journalism in July 2009.

After announcing her retirement, state premier Anna Bligh paid tribute to Bates in the Queensland parliament, describing Bates as a "trailblazer" as well as a "passionate champion of the Fraser Coast".

Upon her retirement, Bates recalled a memorable incident in which she was accused of homophobia despite being an ardent supporter of the LGBTIQ+ community. It arose from a tense interview she conducted with the gay owner of a private education college for international students which was being established in Maryborough. The incident culminated in a float in the Sydney Gay and Lesbian Mardi Gras parade being dedicated to Bates, called "Nancy No Pants".

== Community involvement ==
Bates is also known for her community involvement. She has served as chair of the Queen's Park Military Trail Committee, and as chair of the Brolga Arts and Entertainment Centre Marketing Committee. She was also director of the Wide Bay Water Corporation from 2003 to 2007, and director of the Fraser Coast Show Society from 1996 to 1998.

She has also served as the president of the local Gallipoli Armistice Committee, and is also credited with ensuring a memorial to Duncan Chapman was erected in Maryborough through her work as president of the Duncan Chapman Memorial Appeal Committee.

In 2022, Bates drew national attention for a project she spearheaded in which the appearance of public toilets located behind Maryborough's City Hall were dramatically refurbished to become known as "The Cistern Chapel".

Bates continues to regularly comment on local Fraser Coast issues in the media.

== Awards ==
She received a Queensland Businesswomen's Award in 1996.

In 2008, she was recognised by Australian Provincial Newspapers with a CEO's Award for Excellence. That same year, she also received a United Nations Media Peace Prize, in recognition of incorporating the language of the Butchulla people into the Fraser Coast Chronicle.

In 2015, she was named as the Fraser Coast's Citizen of the Year.

In the 2020 Australia Day Honours, Bates was awarded a Medal of the Order of Australia in recognition of her service to the community of Maryborough.

In 2020, she was named as a Queensland Great.
