= Pete Dunne (disambiguation) =

Pete Dunne may refer to:

- Pete Dunne (author) (fl. 2001–2009), American author
- Pete Dunne (born 1993), wrestler and promoter

== See also ==
- Pete Dunn (born 1948), baseball coach
- Peter Dunne (disambiguation)
