= Bruce Robinson (endocrinologist) =

Australian professor of medicine

Bruce Gregory Robinson AC
- Born: 13 September 1956 (age 69)
- Education: University of Sydney
- Known for: Research into endocrine tumours
- Awards: Companion of the Order of Australia
- Medical career
- Profession: Professor of Medicine
- Field: Endocrinology

Bruce Gregory Robinson AC (born 13 September 1956) is an Australian endocrinologist, medical researcher, and professor of medicine. He served as the Dean of Sydney Medical School within the University of Sydney from 2007 to 2016. His research has focused particularly on endocrine cancers. In 2020, he was awarded the Companion of the Order of Australia for his eminent service to medicine.

== Early life and education ==
Robinson graduated with a Bachelor of Medicine and Bachelor of Surgery (MBBS) from the University of Sydney in 1980, followed by a Master of Science (MSc) from the same university, where his thesis was Vasopressin and the neurohypophysis. He worked at the Royal Alexandra Hospital for Children and Royal North Shore Hospital before undertaking a fellowship at Harvard Medical School between 1986 and 1989. During this fellowship, he conducted molecular research work at the Brigham and Women’s Hospital and Boston Children’s Hospital (Harvard Medical School affiliates), culminating in 1991 with the award of a Doctor of Medicine (MD), where his thesis was Studies Of Corticotropin And Arginine Vasopressingene Expression.

== Medical career ==
=== Medical practice and leadership ===
Robinson is a Fellow of the Royal Australasian College of Physicians (FRACP). He was the head of the Division of Medicine at the Royal North Shore Hospital in Sydney from 1998 to 2006, and he continues to practise as an endocrinologist there. Following that, Robinson served as the dean of Sydney Medical School from 2007 to 2016. Until 2016, he also served as the associate dean (International) at the Faculty of Medicine in the University of Sydney.

=== Research ===
In 1989, after gaining his doctorate, Robinson established the Molecular Genetics Unit, now known as the Cancer Genetics Unit, at the Kolling Institute of Medical Research in the Royal North Shore Hospital. He described this as "one of the most challenging phases of his career".

His research has primarily focused on identifying the genetic factors that contribute to tumour formation in endocrine glands, including the thyroid, parathyroid, adrenal, and pituitary glands. His research posts include:

- Chair of the National Health and Medical Research Council, Australia’s peak advisory and funding body for medical research, from 2015 to 2021.
- Chair of the Australian Government’s taskforce of expert clinicians charged with reviewing the Medicare Benefits Schedule, from 2015 to 2021.
- Co-Head of the Cancer Genetics Group, Kolling Institute of Medical Research, ongoing.
- Chair of Research at the Royal North Shore Hospital in the Northern Sydney Local Health District, since 2022.
- Board Member of the Woolcock Institute of Medical Research, since 2006.

=== Professional service ===
His service to medical organizations includes:

- Non-executive director of biotech company Cochlear Limited, since 2016.
- Non-executive director of ASX-listed pharmaceutical manufacturer Mayne Pharma Group Limited, since 2014.
- Director of life sciences company QBiotics Group Limited, since 2017.
- Founding chairman, now deputy chair of the Hoc Mai Australian Vietnam Medical Foundation, since 2001.
- Member of the editorial boards of Nature, Clinical Practice, Endocrinology, and Thyroid journals.
- Member of the Council of the Endocrine Society of Australia from 2001 to 2005.
- In 2024, he was appointed as a non executive director of CS Pharmaceuticals Ltd, a British company focused on speciality and ocular therapeutics.
- In 2021, after a traumatic incident with a circular saw which almost led to the loss of one of his legs, he was appointed as the first patron of the Medical Benevolent Association of NSW, which supports doctors through times of crisis.

== Awards and recognition ==
In the 2020 Australia Day Honours, Robinson was awarded Australia's highest civilian honour, Companion of the Order of Australia, "for eminent service to medical research, and to national healthcare, through policy development and reform, and to tertiary education".

Other recognition includes:

2001 - awarded the Australian Centenary Medal "for service to medicine".
2008 - awarded the People’s Health Medal by the Vietnamese Government.
2012 - appointed a Member of the Order of Australia in the Queen's Birthday Honours List "for service to medicine in the field of endocrinology as a clinician, researcher and university administrator, and through the establishment and leadership of the Hoc Mai Australian Vietnam Medical Foundation".

== Publications ==
As of March 2025, Scopus lists 377 publications by Robinson, which have been cited 27,107 times, and an h-index of 81.

He has also written or contributed to books with a focus on thyroid disorders and endocrine neoplasia, including:

- Jameson, J. Larry; Groot, Leslie J. De (18 May 2010). "90: Medullary Thyroid Carcinoma and Multiple Endocrine Neoplasia Type 2". Endocrinology - E-Book: Adult and Pediatric. Elsevier Health Sciences. pp. Volume 2 Part VII: Thyroid. ISBN 978-1-4557-1126-0.
- Groot, Leslie J. De; Jameson, J. Larry (1 June 2013). Endocrinology Adult and Pediatric: The Thyroid Gland. Elsevier Health Sciences. ISBN 978-0-323-22153-5.
- Turner, Helen E.; Eastell, Richard; Grossman, Ashley (14 June 2018). Oxford Desk Reference: Endocrinology. Oxford University Press. ISBN 978-0-19-251264-2.
