= Robert MacPherson (Australian artist) =

Australian artist (1937–2021)

- Born: 1937; Brisbane, Queensland, Australia
- Died: 12 November 2021 (aged 84)
- Education: Griffith University (DUniv, 1992)
- Occupation: contemporary artist
- Known for: Texts, drawings, paintings and room-scale installations
- Notable work: 1000 Frog Poems: 1000 Boss Drovers ('Yellow Leaf Falling') For H.S. 1996–2014.

Robert David MacPherson AM (1937 – 12 November 2021) was an Australian artist.

MacPherson was regarded as one of Australia's most respected contemporary artists whose work ranged from texts, drawings, paintings and room-scale installations. His work has been represented in the National Gallery of Australia as well as all state galleries.

After his death, the Queensland Art Gallery and Gallery of Modern Art described MacPherson as having been one of the "most important artists of his generation."

== Life and career ==
MacPherson was born in 1937. After leaving school at the age of 13, he worked in a variety of jobs which included working in factories, on the docks, on cattle properties, in cane fields, and as an antique dealer.

He was known for using his life experience for inspiration. MacPherson was working as a ship painter on Brisbane's wharves when he became active in the Brisbane art scene.

After he had his first exhibition in the 1970s, he furthered his artistic education after being awarded several grants from the Visual Arts Board, which took him to Europe and the United States where he worked in the Greene Street studio in New York.

In 1994, MacPherson's work was exhibited at the Art Gallery of New South Wales. The National Gallery of Victoria hosted a survey of his work the following year.

A major retrospective of MacPherson's work was held at the Museum of Contemporary Art Australia in Sydney and Perth's Art Gallery of Western Australia in 2001, curated by Trevor Smith.

In 2015, Ingrid Periz curated a major solo exhibition of MacPherson's entitled Robert MacPherson: The Painter's Reach at the QAGOMA. This included one of MacPherson's most iconic works "1000 Frog Poems: 1000 Boss Drovers ('Yellow Leaf Falling') For HS 1996-2014" which consisted of a series of 2400 ink and pencil portraits that paid tribute to Australian drovers.

MacPherson has also been included in several biennales and several major international exhibitions including the São Paulo Art Biennial in 2002, the 2007 Den Haag Sculptuur in the Netherlands and the Sharjah Biennial in the United Arab Emirates in 2009.

MacPherson died on 12 November 2021 at the age of 84.

== Honours ==
MacPherson received an honorary doctorate from Griffith University in 1992.

In 1997, the Australia Council awarded him the Visual Arts Emeritus Award.

In January 2001, Australian Art Collector listed MacPherson at #2 on a list of Australia's most collectible artists.

He was named as a Queensland Great in 2015.

He was made a Member of the Order of Australia in the 2020 Australia Day Honours in recognition of his significant service to the visual arts.
