= Cindy Shannon =

Australian academic

Cindy Anne-Maree Shannon AM is an Australian academic best known for her work in the field of Indigenous health.

== Education ==
Cindy Shannon attended Lourdes Hill College in Brisbane, Queensland before taking her Bachelor of Arts at the University of Queensland, graduating in 1986. She studied a Graduate Diploma in Education at the University of Southern Queensland in 1987. She took a Masters of Business Administration from the University of Southern Queensland in 1993 and a Doctor of Social Science, Political Science and Government from the University of Queensland in 2004.

== Career ==
Shannon was appointed as pro-vice-chancellor (Indigenous engagement) of the University of Queensland in 2011. Shannon has also been the director of the Aboriginal and Torres Strait Islander studies unit at the university and is a director of the university's Poche Centre for Indigenous Health.

Shannon was appointed to the council of the Australian Institute of Aboriginal and Torres Strait Studies in 2015.

She is a member of the National Health and Medical Research Council, chairing its Indigenous Advisory Committee from 2005 until 2012. Shannon has also chaired the Queensland Ministerial Advisory Committee on AIDS, sexual health and hepatitis. Shannon also chairs the Board of Advice at the Queensland Aboriginal and Torres Strait Islander Foundation.

Shannon is a Ngugi woman and a descendant of the Quandamooka people.

For her advocacy of Indigenous health and for her contribution to developing and implementing Indigenous health policy, Shannon was named as a Queensland Great in 2017.

In the 2020 Australia Day Honours Shannon was appointed a Member of the Order of Australia (AM) for "significant service to Indigenous health, and to medical education".
