= Grant Featherston =

Australian furniture designer (1922–1995)

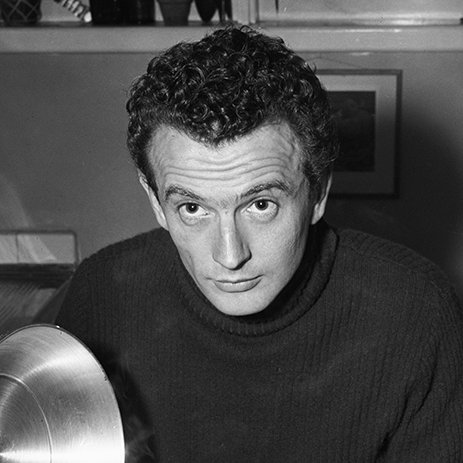
- Grant Featherstone Melbourne, 1953
- Born: Grant Stanley Featherston; 17 October 1922; Geelong, Victoria, Australia
- Died: 9 October 1995 (aged 72); Heidelberg West, Victoria, Australia
- Occupation: Furniture designer
- Notable work: Contour Chair R160
- Spouse: Mary Featherston

Grant Stanley Featherston (17 October 1922 – 9 October 1995) was an Australian furniture designer whose chair designs in the 1950s became icons of the Atomic Age.

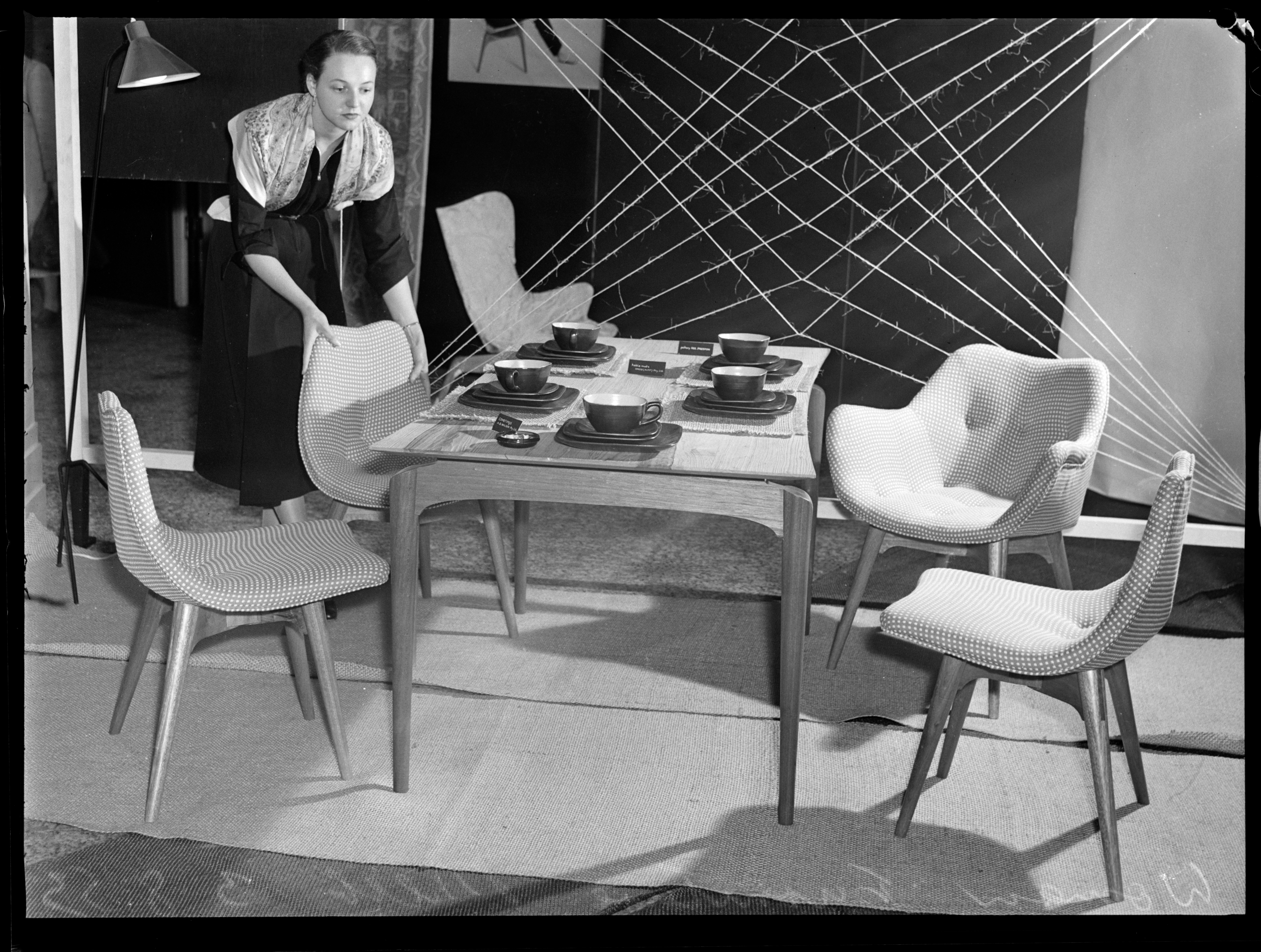
Featherstone furniture display, Melbourne, Australia, 3 August 1953

He was born in Geelong, Victoria. In 1965 he married Mary Bronwyn Currey, an English-born interior designer, and the couple worked in close partnership as interior designers over several decades.

He is most famous for his furniture designs, especially The 'Contour Chair R160’ chair. He marketed his modernist chairs through art galleries including Peter Bray Gallery in Melbourne and they are now highly collectable on a par with fine art and in 2013 began to attain high prices at auction. He is considered Australia's best known furniture designer.

His work has been featured in several museum retrospectives of post-war furniture, including the National Gallery of Victoria 2013 exhibition, Mid-Century Modern Australian Furniture Design.

== Works ==
=== Furniture designs ===
- R152 Chair (1951) Grant Featherston
- Wing Chair (1951) Grant Featherston
- R160 Lounge chair (1951) Grant Featherston
- R161 & R161H (1952) sofa, Grant Featherston
- Z300 Chaise longue (1953) Z300 Grant Featherston (Made under licence by Gordon Mather Industries since 1989)
- Talking chairs (1967) Grant and Mary Featherston
