= Peter Dunne (disambiguation) =

Peter Dunne (born 1954) is a New Zealand politician.

Peter Dunne may also refer to:

- Peter Masten Dunne (1889–1957), American historian
- Fr. Peter Dunne of Fighting Father Dunne

== See also ==
- Pete Dunne (disambiguation)
- Peter Dunn (disambiguation)
