= Mary Hutton (activist) =

- Born: Mary Julia Hutton
- Occupation: Animal activist
- Known for: Founder of the Free the Bears Fund

Mary Julia Hutton OAM (born 1939) is the Australian founder of the Free the Bears Fund, and an animal activist.

== Activism ==
In 1993, Mary Hutton started a petition at her local shopping mall after witnessing on television the extraction of bile from an Asiatic black bear. The bear was in a coffin-sized cage with its bile being removed via an abdominal catheter. Within months she had thousands of signatures and regular supporters. In 1995, Free the Bears Fund was officially formed. The petition was presented to the Chinese Embassy in Canberra and evoked public and media interest. Mary Hutton has continued to raise funds over the years. During this time, she was made aware of the dangers facing the sun bear. Mary was asked to help rescue and relocate some sun bears that had been taken from Phnom Penh restaurants. Her work with the bears spread to encompass multiple species, including Asiatic black bears, sloth bears, and sun bears. The fund is active in Cambodia, Laos, Vietnam, India, Thailand, and Kalimantan.

Hutton has successfully relocated bears to national parks and zoos.

She co-wrote an autobiographical book, Free the Bears, published by Pan Macmillan in 2013 about her work.

== Achievements ==
Hutton was awarded the Medal of the Order of Australia (OAM) in the January 2020 Australian Honours, according to the Perth Now newspaper. Hutton has been a finalist for the Senior Australian of the Year Award five times. In 2017, she was awarded an honorary doctorate from the University of the Sunshine Coast for her work in educating the public. She was nominated for the 2019 Senior Australian of the Year award.
