= Diana Egerton-Warburton =

Australian medical professional

Professor Diana Egerton-Warburton
- Born: Diana Johnston; 21 August 1965 (age 61); WA
- Education: St Hilda’s School, Perth
- Children: Leo Egerton-Ferrari (b. 2001); Eve Ferrari (b. 2003)
- Relatives: Egerton baronets
- Awards: OAM
- Scientific career
- Fields: Emergency medicine
- Workplaces: Monash University

Diana Egerton-Warburton OAM (born 21 August 1965), is an Australian physician and Professor of Clinical Sciences at Monash Health, specialising in emergency medicine.

Egerton-Warburton also serves as an Adjunct Professor of the National Drug Research Institute at Curtin University and Medical Co-Chair of the Monash Emergency Research Collaborative (MERC) at Monash University.

Egerton-Warburton has focused on implementation research working closely with researchers at The Monash Centre for Health Research and Implementation (MCHRI) and Monash Partners where she leads the Emergency Care theme. An example of this is 11 papers on reducing inappropriate intravenous cannulation and reducing serious complications. This research has had national and international impact; it was recognised in the 2015 Victorian Public Healthcare Awards and cited in the Australian Commission on Safety and Quality in Healthcare, Management of Peripheral Intravenous Catheters Clinical Care Standard and World Health Organisation Guidelines on Preventing PIVC Bloodstream Infections.

She has received more than $8M in MRFF grants as CIA in the last 5 years including $2.9M as CIA on a MRFF Clinical Trial grant to reduce unhelpful peripheral IV cannula “Just Say No to the Just in Case PIVC”.

Her more recent implementation work includes the MRFF Clinical Trials 2023 $4.89M for iIMPROVE PSP an implementation stepped-wedge clinical trial (S-WT) of conservative management of primary spontaneous pneumothorax This project was based on the landmark NEJM paper on the conservative management of Primary Spontaneous Pneumothorax which as awarded the ACTA trial of the year in 2021

== Life and background ==
A great-great-great-granddaughter of George Egerton-Warburton (1819–1889) and Augusta née Spencer (1821–1871), her grandfather Piers Egerton-Warburton (1895–1961) was in remainder to the family baronetcy being commissioned into the Australian Light Horse during WWI, before in 1920 marrying Winsome Ewing (1899–1971), daughter of the Hon. John Ewing.

The youngest daughter of Jenefer Egerton-Warburton and Dr Ian Johnston AM, she was educated at St Hilda's School Perth then Bunbury Cathedral Grammar School, before studying at the University of Western Australia (MB, BS) and Monash University (MPH, MClinEpi), later being elected a Fellow of the Australasian College for Emergency Medicine (FACEM) in 1997. Her relatives include the Drake-Brockman, Goyder and Roberts families, as well as her Egerton-Warburton wine-making cousins.

Egerton-Warburton is best known for her research into Australia's drinking culture. She is an executive member of the National Alliance for Action on Alcohol and serves on the board of the Australian National Advisory Council for Alcohol and Drugs.

From 1997 until 2000, Egerton-Warburton served as President of the Australasian Society for Emergency Medicine. In 2013, she was awarded the Australasian College for Emergency Medicine's Teaching Excellence Medal. In 2016, the Australian Medical Association conferred upon Egerton-Warburton the Women in Medicine Award in recognition of her contribution to the development of emergency medicine.

VicHealth recognised Egerton-Warburton and her Australasian College of Emergency Medicine team at the 2017 VicHealth Awards for their Alcohol Harm Snapshot Survey.

Egerton-Warburton was inducted into the Victorian Honour Roll of Women in 2018, and in 2020 honoured with the Order of Australia Medal.

== Opinions ==
A vocal critic of Australia's drinking habits, Egerton-Warburton is opposed to alcohol-orientated public holidays and events such as Australia Day and the annual Beer Can Regatta in Darwin. According to Egerton-Warburton, doctors consider Australia Day to be the busiest day for the "national sport of getting drunk".

Egerton-Warburton has previously called for the sale of alcoholic drinks to be banned after 10 pm, to limit the burden hospital emergency departments face by admitting alcohol-affected patients during nighttime. She has also been critical of media focus on the so-called "ice epidemic" believing methamphetamine use to be "a very small issue" compared with that caused by alcohol consumption.

== See also ==
- Egerton baronets
