= Lea Waters =

Australian psychologist

Lea Waters AM
- Born: 24 February 1971 (age 55); Lara, Victoria, Australia
- Other name: Lea Elizabeth Waters
- Education: University of Melbourne (BS); Deakin University (PhD)
- Spouse: Matthew Scholes (m. 1996-2004)
- Children: 2
- Scientific career
- Fields: Organizational psychology, child and School Psychology, Wellbeing Science
- Workplaces: University of Melbourne

Lea Waters AM (born 24 February 1971) is an Australian psychologist, global speaker, best-selling author and award-winning researcher. She is a psychology professor at the University of Melbourne, and was the founding director of the Centre for Wellbeing Science at the University of Melbourne, formerly the Centre for Positive Psychology. In addition, she has affiliate positions at University of Michigan and sits on the Science Board of The University of California and Berkeley’s Greater Good Science Center. Her main areas of research are positive psychology, trauma recovery, adversarial growth, resilience, school psychology and parenting.

She was the 2017-2019 President of the International Positive Psychology Association and the Chair of the 6th World Congress in Positive Psychology. Waters was awarded Member of the Order of Australia in 2020.

== Early life ==
Waters received a Bachelor’s Degree with honors in Psychology in 1992 from the University of Melbourne. Waters then received a Ph.D. in Industrial and Organizational Psychology in 1997 from the Deakin University.

== Career ==
From January 1996, Waters has been a researcher and professor at the University of Melbourne. She has been a psychologist for 25 years and is registered with AHRPA, is a member of the Australian Psychological Society and a member of the College of Organizational Psychologists. In 2005, Waters developed her own consultancy business called 'Visible Wellbeing' working with schools and corporations. She is also a gifted speaker and has been on speaking tours across the globe including speaking at the World Government Summit in Dubai in 2018. Her work has been featured in the Washington Post, the Toronto Globe and The Sydney Morning Herald.

Waters' acclaimed parenting book The Strength Switch was listed in Top Reads by Berkeley University’s Greater Good Science Centre and Top 5 Books UK. It has been translated into Chinese, Japanese, Korean, Taiwanese, Hungarian, Arabic, Spanish, French and Russian.

Waters, working with Martin Seligman and St Peter's College, Adelaide, has been instrumental in the development and implementation of positive education programs throughout Australia. Waters is committed to translating research and working with the media. She has written for the Wall Street Journal, TIME.com Magazine, The Atlantic, and The Guardian. Waters has also appeared on the TEDx Talk. She is the Director of the teacher training program Visible Wellbeing and has developed student e-wellbeing resources for teachers to deliver to students via online and virtual classrooms.

== Selected publications ==
- Waters, Lea; Strauss, Gabriel; Somech, Anit; Haslam, Nick; Dussert, Denise (31 January 2020). "Does team psychological capital predict team outcomes at work?". International Journal of Wellbeing. 10 (1): 1–25. doi:10.5502/ijw.v10i1.923. hdl:11343/234400. ISSN 1179-8602.
- Waters, Lea; Sun, Jessie (1 December 2016). "Can a Brief Strength-Based Parenting Intervention Boost Self-Efficacy and Positive Emotions in Parents?". International Journal of Applied Positive Psychology. 1 (1–3): 41–56. doi:10.1007/s41042-017-0007-x. hdl:11343/283229. ISSN 2364-5059. S2CID 151528568.
- Waters, Lea; Barsky, Adam; Ridd, Amanda; Allen, Kelly (1 March 2015). "Contemplative Education: A Systematic, Evidence-Based Review of the effect of Meditation Interventions in Schools". Educational Psychology Review. 27 (1): 103–134. doi:10.1007/s10648-014-9258-2. ISSN 1573-336X. S2CID 145149774.
- Waters, Lea (2011). "A Review of School-Based Positive Psychology Interventions". The Educational and Developmental Psychologist. 28 (2): 75–90. doi:10.1375/aedp.28.2.75. ISSN 1839-2504. S2CID 27351264.
- Kern, Margaret L.; Waters, Lea E.; Adler, Alejandro; White, Mathew A. (4 May 2015). "A multidimensional approach to measuring well-being in students: Application of the PERMA framework". The Journal of Positive Psychology. 10 (3): 262–271. doi:10.1080/17439760.2014.936962. ISSN 1743-9760. PMC 4337659. PMID 25745508.
- Waters, Lea; McCabe, Marita; Kiellerup, Denis; Kiellerup, Steven (1 September 2002). "The Role of Formal Mentoring on Business Success and Self-Esteem in Participants of a New Business Start-Up Program". Journal of Business and Psychology. 17 (1): 107–121. doi:10.1023/A:1016252301072. ISSN 1573-353X. S2CID 145131499.

== Selected awards ==
- 2020: Member of the Order of Australia.
- 2015: Top 100 Women of Influence in Australia, Westpac Bank and Financial Review.
- 2007: Prime Minister’s Award for Best Australian University Teaching Excellence Award.

== Personal life ==
Waters was married to Matthew Scholes (1996-2024). The couple had two children, Nicholas and Emily.
