= Mary Featherston =

Australian interior designer

- Born: 1943 (age 82–83); Shirley
- Occupations: Interior architect, designer
- Spouse: Grant Featherston
- Awards: Member of the Order of Australia (For significant service to the arts, particularly to interior and industrial design., Ms Mary FEATHERSTON, 2020)
- Website: www.featherston.com.au

Mary Bronwyn Featherston AM (born 1943) is an Australian interior designer specialising in design of learning environments. The focus of her research and practice is the relationship between young people, learning theory and the design of supportive physical environments in cultural venues and schools. She has collaborated with leading Australian and international educators, architects and policy makers to develop participatory processes and innovative physical environments. Her work has been widely awarded and published. As an activist Mary helped to develop new services for families and children: Community Child Care & Community schools in 1970s, Reggio Emilia Australia Information Exchange 1994. In 1982 Mary successfully campaigned for establishment of Australia's first Children's Museum in the Museum Victoria.

Mary is an Adjunct Professor at RMIT University, in 2020 she was made a member of the Order of Australia.

In 1965 Mary formed a life and professional partnership with designer Grant Featherston, they were inaugural inductees into the Design Hall of Fame, they are represented in the collections of several State Galleries and the National Gallery of Australia.

== Work ==
Featherston is most known for her work designing play and learning environments for children. Major projects include the furnishing of the National Gallery of Victoria, establishing the Children's Museum of Victoria in 1985.

Featherston was involved in the campaign to establish Community Child Care in 1973 and Reggio Emilia Australia Information Exchange in 1995.

=== Public collections ===
National Gallery of Victoria, 8 works

== Exhibitions ==
Design for Life: Grant and Mary Featherston, Heide Museum, 30 June 7 October 2018. Curator/s: Kirsty Grant and Denise Whitehouse

Currently 8 works of art in the National Gallery of Victoria.

== Awards ==
- Design Institute of Australia Hall of Fame in 1996
- Member of the Order of Australia in 2020
