= Peter Dunn (historian) =

Australian military historian

Peter Dunn OAM
- Born: Peter James Dunn
- Occupation: Military historian
- Awards: Medal of the Order of Australia

Peter James Dunn is an Australian historian who specialises in researching all aspects of military operations, training, and exercises that occurred in Australia during the Second World War. Dunn is particularly interested in researching wartime military aircraft losses and, in 2012, was responsible for identifying an unknown aircraft wreck off Magnetic Island as being that of a Curtiss-Wright CW-22 that had ditched in 1943. As part of the Australia Day 2020 Honours List, Dunn was awarded the Medal of the Order of Australia "for service to community history".

== Website ==
On 22 June 1996, Dunn launched his Australia @ War website where he has described his research as a "part-time hobby". Despite this, the website is particularly renowned for cataloguing the historical details of Second World War military aircraft crashes that occurred across Australia and, as of 2019, the website reportedly listed over 2000 such incidents.
