= 2014 Australia Day Honours =

The 2014 Australia Day Honours were announced on 26 January 2014 by the Governor General of Australia, Quentin Bryce.

The Australia Day Honours are the first of the two major annual honours lists, announced on Australia Day (26 January), with the other being the Queen's Birthday Honours which are announced on the second Monday in June.

== Order of Australia ==
=== Companion of the Order of Australia (AC) ===
Order of Australia (Civil) ribbon

==== General Division ====
Recipient	Citation
Professor Samuel Frank Berkovic AM	For eminent service to biomedical research in the field of epilepsy genetics as a leading academic and clinician, to the study of neurology on a national and international level, and as an ambassador for Australian medical science education.
Professor Edward Byrne AO	For eminent service to tertiary education, particularly through leadership and governance roles with Monash University, to biomedical teaching and research, as a scientist and academic mentor, and as a contributor to improved global health.
Timothy Vincent Fairfax AM	For eminent service to business and to the community, as an advocate for philanthropy and as a major supporter of the visual arts, to the promotion of higher education opportunities, and to rural and regional development programs.
Professor Bruce Harold McKellar	For eminent service to science, particularly the study of theoretical physics, as an academic, educator and researcher, through seminal contributions to scientific development organisations, and as an author and mentor.
Geoffrey Rush	For eminent service to the arts as a theatre performer, motion picture actor and film producer, as a role model and mentor for aspiring artists, and through support for, and promotion of, the Australian arts industry.
Her Honour the Hon Sally Thomas AM	For eminent service to the people of the Northern Territory, particularly to the judiciary and social justice, to the advancement of women in the legal profession, to youth, and to the promotion and development of tertiary education.
Dr Yunupingu †	For eminent service to the performing arts as a musician and songwriter, to the advancement of education and social justice for Indigenous people, and as an advocate for cultural exchange and understanding.

Order of Australia (Military) ribbon

==== Military Division ====
Branch	Recipient	Citation
Air Force	Air Marshal Mark Donald Binskin AO	Air Marshal Binskin is the consummate military professional who has provided eminent leadership in the fields of air power, people management and strategic reform. His relentless enthusiasm and astute command traits have delivered exceptional advances in the joint capability of the Australian Defence Force. His achievements are testament to 36 years of unswerving dedication, steadfast commitment and inspirational leadership.

=== Officer of the Order of Australia (AO) ===
==== General Division ====
Recipient	Citation
Stephanie Ann Alexander OAM	For distinguished service to education through the design and establishment of schools-based learning programs promoting improved food and eating choices for children, and as an author.
Professor Christine Constance Bennett	For distinguished service to medicine and healthcare leadership, as a clinician, researcher and educator, particularly in the fields of child and family health and social policy.
Professor Anthony Roland Blackshield	For distinguished service to the law as an academic, to legal education and scholarship, as a contributor to leading professional publications, and as an author and commentator.
Dr Richard John Brennan	For distinguished service to the international community through seminal contributions to humanitarian health, emergency medicine, and disaster response organisations, particularly in developing nations.
Dr Andrew Arnold Burbidge	For distinguished service to the environment as a conservation biologist, to sustainable management practices, and to the preservation of endangered flora and fauna.
Robert Ian Campbell PSM	For distinguished service to public administration through innovative policy development, reform and administration at the national level, particularly the provision of services for veterans and their families.
Professor David Stephen Celermajer	For distinguished service to medicine in the field of cardiology, as a clinician and researcher, to improved medical diagnostic methods, and to the promotion of heart health, particularly in children and young adults.
Professor Michael John Cousins AM	For distinguished service to medicine through specialised tertiary curriculum development, as a researcher and advocate for reform and human rights in the field of pain, and as an author and mentor.
Virginia Louise Cox AM	For distinguished service to architecture as a practitioner, through executive roles with international professional organisations, and to architectural education and heritage conservation.
Professor Michael Matthew Daube	For distinguished service to medicine, particularly in the area of public health policy and reform, through advisory roles with leading national and international organisations, and to youth.
Robert de Castella MBE	For distinguished service to the community through programs promoting children's health and fitness, as a supporter and mentor of young Indigenous men and women, and to marathon running.
Dimity Ann Dornan AM	For distinguished service to the international community, particularly through the establishment of health care and clinical training programs to prevent and treat hearing loss in babies and young children.
Emeritus Professor Ronald Charles Duncan	For distinguished service to international relations as a leading economist, and through innovative economic policy development to raise living standards in Papua New Guinea and Pacific Island nations.
The Honourable Michael Rueben Egan	For distinguished service to the Parliament of New South Wales through a range of senior ministerial roles, to tertiary education administration and medical research, and to the community.
Dr Penelope Ruth Flett	For distinguished service to aged persons through significant contributions to improve care and support services, to education, and to the community of Western Australia.
Louis Fleyfel OAM	For distinguished service to the Lebanese community in Australia, to the identification and implementation of bilateral trade and investment opportunities, and to philanthropy.
The Honourable Justice Robert William Gotterson	For distinguished service to the judiciary and to the law, to legal education, administration and professional standards through a range of senior roles, and to the community of Queensland.
Dr John Michael Grill	For distinguished service to engineering, and to business, to the minerals, energy and power supply industries, and as a supporter of advanced education and training.
Richard Anthony Johnson MBE	For distinguished service to architecture, particularly the design of iconic Australian public buildings, to the visual arts and the museum and galleries sector, and to professional associations.
Dr Murray Chilvers Kemp	For distinguished service to education as an economic theorist and academic, to international trade, through contributions to leading professional publications, and as a mentor.
Dr Andrew Nicholas Liveris	For distinguished service to international business through senior roles with multinational organisations, as a supporter of Australia-US educational and cultural relations, and to the community.
Keiran James McNamara †	For distinguished service to public administration in Western Australia, to natural resource management and environmental protection policy reform and implementation, and to the community.
Professor Geofferey Norman Masters	For distinguished service to education research, to the formulation of a national curriculum and performance reporting mechanisms, and to improved educational outcomes for young people.
Dr Susan Denise Meek	For distinguished service to science, to the development and implementation of policy for science and research, particularly gene technology regulation, and through leadership roles with professional organisations.
Peter Neil Muller	For distinguished service to architecture, to the adaptation and preservation of Indigenous design and construction, and to the integration of the built and environmental landscape.
Dr Sadanandan E K Nambiar	For distinguished service to science, particularly in the field of sustainable productivity and management of forests, as a researcher and author, and as a role model for young scientists.
Professor Peter W G Newman	For distinguished service to science education as an academic and researcher, through contributions to urban design and transport sustainability, and to the community.
Robert Ian Oatley BEM	For distinguished service to the Australian wine and tourism industries, to yacht racing, and to the community as a supporter of medical research and visual arts organisations.
Professor Rosemary Joan Owens	For distinguished service to the law, particularly to legal education as an academic and administrator, to national and international employment and labour organisations, and to women.
Professor Stephen John Parker	For distinguished service to tertiary education through administrative, academic and representational roles, and as a leader in the growth and development of the University of Canberra.
Scientia Professor Deo Karan Prasad	For distinguished service to architecture, particularly in the field of sustainable urban design, as an academic and researcher, and to the solar renewable energy sector.
Kaye Elizabeth Schofield	For distinguished service to vocational and adult education and training, as a researcher and commentator, through contributions to policy development and regulation, and to the community.
John Sinclair	For distinguished service to conservation and the environment, through advocacy and leadership roles with a range of organisations, and to natural resource management and protection.
Emeritus Professor Malcolm Preston Skilbeck	For distinguished service to tertiary education as an administrator, researcher and author, and through significant contributions to curriculum development and policy formation, both nationally and internationally.
The Honourable Jonathan Donald Stanhope	For distinguished service to the community of the Australian Capital Territory through leadership roles, to the advancement of human rights and social justice, and to economic development.
Professor Susan Patricia Street	For distinguished service to the performing arts, particularly to dance education at a tertiary level, as a teacher and administrator, to professional organisations, and as a mentor.
Professor John Francis Thompson	For distinguished service to medicine in the field of oncology research, particularly melanoma, to national and international professional organisations, and to medical education.
Professor Charles David Throsby	For distinguished service to the community as a leading cultural economist, to the promotion and preservation of Australian arts and heritage, and to tertiary education.
Jacqueline Ruth Weaver	For distinguished service to the performing arts as an actor and entertainer, as a supporter of social welfare organisations, and as a role model and mentor to young performers.
Associate Professor Edward Thomas Wilkes	For distinguished service to the Indigenous community as a leading researcher in the area of public health and welfare, to youth in Western Australia, and to the provision of legal support services.

==== Military Division ====
Branch	Recipient	Citation
Navy	Rear Admiral Trevor Norman Jones AM CSC RAN	Rear Admiral Jones has distinguished himself as an extremely motivated officer, whose personable manner and highly developed leadership style has profoundly influenced workforce management outcomes, general cultural reform, and the development of critical financial and capability governance controls. His achievements bring him enormous credit and are in keeping with the highest traditions of the Royal Australian Navy and the Australian Defence Force.
Air Force	Air Vice-Marshal Gavin Neil Davies CSC	Air Vice-Marshal Davies is the epitome of professionalism who has distinguished himself through exceptional leadership in shaping the Royal Australian Air Force of the future; advancing Air Force's relationship with the United States military; and deftly managing change to deliver Air Force's contribution to the Strategic Reform Program. His extraordinary achievements have brought great credit on himself and the Royal Australian Air Force, and are in the finest traditions of the Australian Defence Force.

=== Member of the Order of Australia (AM) ===
==== General Division ====
Recipient	Citation
Peter Charles Achterstratt	For significant service to public administration through financial management and governance roles, and to the community.
Dr Vikija Andersons RFD	For significant service to medicine as an ophthalmologist and surgeon.
Donald Allen Baxter	For significant service to the community as an advocate for people affected by and living with HIV/AIDS.
Ian John Blandthorn	For significant service to workforce training and development in the retail, wholesale and personal services industries.
Paul Damian Bongiorno	For significant service to the print and broadcast media as a journalist, political commentator and editor.
Sarina Jann Bratton	For significant service to tourism, particularly the cruise ship industry, and to business.
Dr Brenton Thomas Broadstock	For significant service to music as a composer, educator and mentor.
John Gilbert Brogden	For significant service to the community through representational roles with social welfare organisations, particularly Lifeline, to the business and financial sectors, and to the Parliament of New South Wales.
Garry Browne	For significant service to the community as a supporter of a range of social welfare, youth, Jewish and environmental organisations, and to business.
James Bruce	For significant service to the arts in South Australia, and to the community as a supporter of youth and cultural associations.
John Bryson	For significant service to Australian literature, particularly as an author, through contributions to Indigenous youth, and to the community.
Timothy Gerard Bugg	For significant service to the law, particularly through executive roles with professional legal organisations, and to the community.
Judith Marion Bundy	For significant service to public education through governance and advocacy roles, and to the community of South Australia.
Sue-Ellen Bussell	For significant service to industrial relations, as a supporter of women in business, and to the aviation sector.
Professor Phyllis Noemi Butow	For significant service to medicine in the field of psychology, as an academic, researcher and author, and to professional organisations.
Andrew Chisholm Cameron	For significant service to the visual and dramatic arts through administrative roles.
Sue Campbell-Lloyd	For significant service to public health through the promotion of immunisation programs.
Joseph Chakman	For significant service to optometry and public health, particularly through policy reform.
Susan Lyndsay Charlton	For significant service to the community of South Australia through a range of philanthropic and charitable organisations, and to physiotherapy.
Julian Reginald Clarke	For significant service to the Australian print media, and to the community through cultural, health care and economic development organisations.
Sister Pauline Marcella Coll	For significant service to the Catholic Church in Australia, and as an advocate for the protection of women and children, particularly in the Asia-Pacific region.
Andrew Clive Collett	For significant service to the law, as a supporter of Indigenous legal rights, and through contributions to professional organisations.
Carol Lyn Cooke	For significant service to sport as a gold medallist at the London 2012 Paralympic Games, and through fundraising and representational roles with charitable healthcare organisations.
Dr Carol Cox	For significant service to medicine in rural and remote areas as a general practitioner, to education, and to professional medical organisations.
David Charles Crombie	For significant service to the meat and livestock industry, and as a supporter of social welfare, primary producer and sporting organisations.
Trevor Egon Danos	For significant service to the community through contributions to a range of scientific, education, government, legal and charitable associations.
The Reverend Father Walter Anthony Dethlefs	For significant service to youth through a range of advocacy, social justice and welfare roles, and to the community of Brisbane.
The Reverend Father Kevin Joseph Dillon	For significant service to the Catholic Church in Australia, to health and social welfare support services, and to veterans.
Brian John Doyle	For significant service to the community through roles with philanthropic, education and health research organisations, and to the law.
Emeritus Professor John Ross Egerton	For significant service to the livestock industry, particularly the eradication of infectious disease, and to education.
The Reverend Father Michael John Elligate	For significant service to the Catholic Church in Australia, to the promotion of ethics in research, and to the community.
Allan Gordon Ezzy APM	For significant service to local government in New South Wales, and to the community through law enforcement, church and service organisations.
Paul Clement Fensom	For significant service to education as principal of a range of schools, to educational development, and as a mentor.
Professor Ruth Fincher	For significant service to education, particularly geography and urban studies, and to national and international geographic associations.
Dr Graham Francis Fleming	For significant service to medicine in rural South Australia, and as an advocate in the field of mental health and suicide prevention.
Ian John Folder	For significant service to the agricultural sector, particularly horticulture, through the production and development of natural insecticide plants.
Robyn Mary Gaspari	For significant service to the community, particularly women, and as a supporter of charitable, youth and social welfare organisations.
Robert Alexander Gell	For significant service to conservation, to the protection of coastal and marine environments, and to the community.
Emeritus Professor Andrew Leigh Gilbert	For significant service to pharmacy as an educator, researcher and administrator, and to professional organisations.
The Honourable Peter Ross Gray	For significant service to the judiciary through the Federal Court of Australia, to legal education, and as a mentor.
Dr Mark Edward Gryst	For significant service to dentistry through a range of clinical, research and educational roles, and to professional organisations.
David Capp Hall	For significant service to the community as a supporter of a range of church, charitable and social welfare groups, and to business.
Anwar Harb	For significant service to the Lebanese community in Australia, particularly to multicultural journalism, and as a supporter of interfaith dialogue.
Bruce Harris	For significant service to the performing arts through a range of administrative roles, and to youth.
Dr Stewart Alfred Hart	For significant service to medicine as a clinician, particularly in the area of breast cancer research, and to community health organisations.
Bruce Charles Hartnett	For significant service to the community through the Australia Day Committee in Victoria, and to education and industrial relations.
Nancye Lee Hayes OAM	For significant service to the performing arts, particularly musical theatre, as an actor, choreographer and director.
Kenneth Francis Healey	For significant service to the performing arts as an educator, and as a mentor to emerging playwrights.
Ivan Heazlewood	For significant service to primary industry, particularly sheep breeding, showing and judging.
Dr Harry Hemley	For significant service to medicine through delivering health care to the homeless, and as a general practitioner.
Michael Gordon Hewitson	For significant service to education, to the Anglican Church in Australia, and to the community of Unley.
Miriam Joyce High	For significant service to people with disabilities, and to the community.
Dr Vernon Barton Hill	For significant service to rehabilitation medicine and spinal injuries.
Dr Terence Joseph Hillman	For significant service to environmental science in the field of limnology.
Dr Anne Kathleen Hoggett	For significant service to environmental research and conservation.
Winthrop Professor Cashel D'arcy Holman	For significant service to medicine in the field of epidemiology and public health.
Kim Allan Horne	For significant service to the mining sector through a range of executive roles.
Alma Joyce Hudson	For significant service to the community through the recording and preservation of Indigenous languages, and to education.
Douglas Egerton Humann	For significant service to conservation and the environment.
Gregory Phillip Hutchinson	For significant service to the community, to philanthropy, and to business and social enterprise.
Peter John Jopling QC	For significant service to the law in Victoria, and to the community.
Peter George Kaye	For significant service to youth, and to the community.
The Honourable Justice Stephen William Kaye	For significant service to the law and to the judiciary, particularly in the area of Indigenous social justice and cultural awareness.
John Desmond Kelleher PSM	For significant service to the community, particularly as a forensic specialist in the field of fire and explosion investigation.
Robert William Kelly	For significant service to the performing and visual arts in Queensland through a range of roles, and to the law.
Narelle Anne Kennedy	For significant service to business in Australia through a range of policy development and advisory roles.
Associate Professor Richard William King	For significant service to medicine as a clinician, educator and administrator, particularly in the areas of health policy development.
Philip Leslie Laffer	For significant service to the Australian wine industry as a winemaker, and to trade, marketing, and research and development programs.
Dawn Lawrie	For significant service to public administration, particularly as an advocate for social inclusion, and to the Parliament of the Northern Territory.
Colin Campbell McDonald	For significant service to tennis as an administrator, to cricket as a player, and to the community.
Professor John David McLaren	For significant service to education, particularly the humanities and social sciences, as an academic, mentor and teacher.
Kevin Peter McLintock	For significant service to the Australian wine industry through a range of executive roles.
David Charles McMicken	For significant service to the performing arts, particularly through the development of Indigenous dance.
Barbara Jean McPhee	For significant service to physiotherapy as a practitioner in occupational health, and as an author.
Geoffrey Alan McPherson	For significant service to the multicultural community of the Australian Capital Territory through the provision of refugee assistance programs.
Tony Mack	For significant service to the performing arts, particularly theatre for children and youth.
The Honourable Dr Francis Leslie Madill	For significant service to the Parliament of Tasmania, to medicine as a general practitioner, and to the community.
David Allan Maloney	For significant service to the visual and performing arts, and to the law, particularly in the natural resources sector.
Steven Anthony Mark	For significant service to the law, to legal regulation, social justice and Indigenous rights, and to the community.
Professor Glenn Mark Marshall	For significant service to medicine in the field of paediatric oncology.
Ian Martin	For significant service to the Wayside Chapel, to business, and to the community.
Elizabeth Anne Mazzei	For significant service to nursing through a range of professional and voluntary organisations, and to the community.
Dr David Roy Mills	For significant service to science in the field of applied physics, particularly solar energy research and development.
Kieran Modra OAM	For significant service to sport as an athlete representing Australia at Paralympic Games, and to people who are blind or have low vision.
Professor Rob Moodie	For significant service to medicine through HIV/AIDS research, and through leadership roles in population health and disease prevention programs.
Emeritus Professor Graham Lindsay Morrison	For significant service to science in the field of applied physics, particularly renewable energy and solar thermal technologies.
Dr Robin Moncrieff Morrow	For significant service to children's literature, and through leadership roles with a range of professional associations.
Dr Brian Keith Morton	For significant service to medicine as a general practitioner, and to a range of professional medical organisations.
Didier Marcel Murcia	For significant service to the international community through support for the provision of medical and educational resources in Tanzania.
The Honourable Michael John Murray QC	For significant service to the judiciary, to law reform and education, and to the community.
Peter Thomas Myers	For significant service to sports medicine and orthopaedic surgery.
Paula Nagel	For significant service to higher education in South Australia, to the arts, and to the community.
Timothy Maxwell Newth	For significant service to the performing arts, particularly through the development of Indigenous dance.
Dr Julia Catherine Newton-Howes	For significant service to the international community through executive roles with aid organisations, and to women.
Dr Ian Andrew Nicholson	For significant service to medicine in the field of cardiac surgery, and through volunteer outreach programs in the Pacific and Africa.
Janice Kaye Nitschke	For significant service to librarianship in South Australia, and to the community.
Professor Ian Eric North	For significant service to the visual arts as a photographer, curator and educator.
Dr Michael Anthony Nugent	For significant service to dentistry as an orthodontic surgeon, mentor and consultant, and to international dental programs.
Dr Conall O'Connell	For significant service to public administration and governance, and to Australia's agricultural, forestry and fisheries sectors.
Francis Creagh O'Connor	For significant service to cricket through a range of international and domestic governance roles.
Vicki Susan O'Halloran	For significant service to people with a disability through roles with a range of organisations, and to the community.
Professor John Harvey Olver	For significant service to medicine, particularly the treatment and rehabilitation of acquired brain injuries.
Associate Professor John Herbert Overton OAM, RFD	For significant service to medicine, particularly in the area of anaesthesia, through clinical, administration and advisory roles, and to professional organisations.
Associate Professor Carolyn Denton Palmer	For significant service to the community, particularly to people who are blind or have low vision.
Norma Evelyn Pearce	For significant service to people with a disability, and to the community of Mansfield.
Cheryl Elizabeth "Shelly" Peers	For significant service to primary education, particularly science, to curriculum development, and to professional organisations.
Andrew Michael Penfold	For significant service to the Indigenous community, particularly through the provision of educational programs for students.
Dr Lee-Anne Elizabeth Perry	For significant service to secondary education as a principal, to curriculum development, and to professional educational associations.
Adele Deirdre Rice	For significant service to secondary education, and to the refugee and migrant community, particularly through the provision of specialist learning and settlement programs.
Dr William Daniel "Bill" Roberts	For significant service to the community through roles in health administration and as a general practitioner.
Margaret Amelia Rodgers	For significant service to the Anglican Church of Australia through governance and representational roles, and to ecumenical affairs.
Professor David Keith Round	For significant service to business and commerce, particularly in the areas of competition policy and market regulation.
Phillip Kenneth Ruthven	For significant service to business and commerce, and to the community.
Arnold Desmond Saint	For significant service to the community of South Australia through roles with a range of aged care, education and sporting organisations.
David Harry Savage	For significant service to international relations through roles in development aid, human rights abuse and war crime investigations, and peacekeeping.
Robert Russell Savage	For significant service to business, particularly the profession of accountancy through a range of roles, and to the community.
Dr Heather York Schnagl	For significant service to education as a school principal, and through roles with professional organisations.
Dr Moira Jean Scollay	For significant service to vocational education and training, and to public sector management reform.
Andrew Paul Sheahan	For significant service to secondary education as a teacher, and through roles with sporting, charitable and community organisations.
Bernard Smith	For significant service to science and technology, and to the community of Tallangatta.
Ian William Smith	For significant service to aviation through promotional and development roles, to the air show industry, and to the community.
Dr Paul Douglas Stalley	For significant service to medicine, particularly the treatment of bone and soft tissue cancers.
Frederika Elsje "Freddie" Steen	For significant service to the refugee and migrant community as a supporter and advocate.
William George "Bill" Stefaniak RFD	For significant service to the community of the Australian Capital Territory through a range of elected, appointed and voluntary roles.
William John Storer	For significant service to the visual arts, particularly through the development of regional and community museums.
Major Sumner	For significant service to the Indigenous community of South Australia through contributions to health, social welfare, youth and cultural heritage organisations.
The Honourable Dr Ross Alan Sundberg QC	For significant service to the law as a judge, reporter and educator
Dr Ross Lindsay Tellam	For significant service to science through research roles in the field of livestock productivity and sustainability.
Liesl Tesch	For significant service to sport as a gold medallist at the London 2012 Paralympic Games, and through the promotion and facilitation of sport for people with disabilities.
Professor Alexander "Ross" Thomas	For significant service to education through the study and advancement of educational administration.
Patrick Alan Thomas MBE	For significant service to music, particularly as a conductor and broadcaster.
David Wemyss Tillett	For significant service to the sport of sailing.
Andrew Arnold Tink	For significant service to the Parliament of New South Wales, to local history, and to the law.
Dr Phillip Gregory Truskett	For significant service to medicine, particularly the development and practice of surgery.
Dr Lyle Vail	For significant service to environmental research and conservation.
Peter Nicholas V'Landys	For significant service to horseracing through a range of executive roles.
Richard Tresillian Walsh	For significant service to primary industry through the agricultural show movement in South Australia, and to the community.
Professor Catherine Anne Warner	For significant service to the law, particularly in the areas of legal education and reform, and to the community.
Dr Guy Wilkie Warren OAM	For significant service to the visual arts as a painter, teacher, mentor and competition judge.
Dr James Edwin Watts	For significant service to primary industry, particularly wool production.
Leslie Robert Wielinga	For significant service to the public sector through the development and administration of roads and infrastructure.
Dr David Morgan Williams	For significant service to the community of the Illawarra region.
Dr Philip Laurence Williams	For significant service to business as an economist, and to the community.
Dr Peter Martin Winterton	For significant service to youth through a range of child protection roles, and to medicine.
Dr Barbara Ann Woodward	For significant service to international relations through business and charitable organisations.
Murray Lewis Yaxley †	For significant service to community health through support for medical research, and to education.
Her Honour Mary Anne Yeats	For significant service to the law, particularly Indigenous justice.
Professor Graeme Paul Young	For significant service to medicine through a range of research, clinical and academic roles, particularly in the area of gastrointestinal health.
Klaus Zimmerman	For significant service to aged persons through executive roles with support organisations.

==== Military Division ====
Branch	Recipient	Citation
Navy	Captain Michael James Rothwell RAN	For exceptional performance of duty as Director Information, Communication and Technology Capability Coordination in the Chief Information Officer Group, and as Amphibious and Afloat Support Group Capability Manager.
Navy	Commodore Andrew John Smith RAN	For exceptional service as a senior logistics officer in Navy, Joint Operations Command, United States Joint Staff and the Defence Materiel Organisation, between 2002 and 2012.
Army	Brigadier Paul Thomas Blood	For exceptional service as Commander of the 5th Brigade
Army	Colonel Leonard Basil Brennan	For exceptional service to the Australian Defence Force in the field of health support as Director Health, Headquarters Joint Operations Command; Director Army Health; and Senior Medical Officer, Combined Team Uruzgan.
Army	Colonel Natasha Anne Fox CSC	For exceptional performance of duty as Chief of Staff, Headquarters Joint Task Force 633 on Operation SLIPPER from June 2012 to January 2013.
Army	Lieutenant Colonel Jason Mitchell Logue	For exceptional service in the areas of Military Public Affairs and Information Operations for the Australian Defence Force, particularly as Senior Military Public Affairs Officer in Headquarters Joint Operations Command.
Army	Colonel Kevin Charles Packham CSM	For exceptional performance of duty in the field of Defence Logistics and as Director of Operations and Training Area Management.
Army	Major General the Honourable Justice Richard Ross Tracey RFD	For exceptional service in the field of military law, as a consultant for the Director of Army Legal Services, and as Judge Advocate General of the Australian Defence Force.
Air Force	Air Commodore Anthony Patrick Grady	For exceptional service to the Australian Defence Force in Air Combat Development.
Air Force	Air Vice-Marshal Neil Campbell Hart	For exceptional service as Commander Air Combat Group and Head Joint Capability Coordination Division.
Air Force	Air Commodore Terence John Saunder	For exceptional service in the fields of commercial contracting and technical airworthiness regulatory reform.

=== Medal of the Order of Australia (OAM) ===
==== General Division ====
Recipient	Citation
Vera Lillian Abell	For service to the community, coordinating charitable donations.
Douglas Andrew Adam	For service to the community of Taroom.
Dr Ghayath Al-Shelh	For service to the community of the Bankstown region, particularly youth.
Michael James Anderson	For service to sport as a Gold Medallist at the London 2012 Paralympic Games.
Margaret Mary Andrews	For service to the Catholic Church in Australia through a range of marriage education programs.
Gwenyth Ethel Anning	For service to the community of Peaceful Bay.
Wayne Richard Anthoney	For service to Indigenous Australians, and to the performing arts.
Dr Trevor George Appleton †	For service to education through the teaching and promotion of chemistry.
Rory Edward Argyle	For service to the community, and to the law
Christopher John Arthur	For service to conservation and the environment.
Kathleen Joy Ashton	For service to the community through drug and alcohol support services.
Robert Barry Asquith	For service to the community through the promotion of local events and projects.
Edward George "Ted" Atchison	For service to the community of the Hunter Valley through service and sporting organisations.
Michael Christopher Auprince	For service to sport as a gold medallist at the London 2012 Paralympic Games.
Brenda Aynsley	For service to the information and communications technology sector.
Dr Ian James Baguley	For service to medicine, particularly brain injury rehabilitation.
Marjorie May Bailey	For service to the community through contributions to music organisations.
Peter Andrew Baines	For service to international humanitarian aid in Thailand.
Gladys Bak	For service to veterans and their families.
Robert Richard Bak	For service to veterans and their families.
Joseph Nicholas Bakhash	For service to the community of Cloncurry.
Dr Pratish Chandra Bandopadhayay	For service to the Bengali and Nepalese community.
Ronald Frederick Barker	For service to cultural heritage, particularly the history of fire services.
Dr Ramzi Barnouti	For service to the community through a range of multicultural and health organisations.
The Reverend Trevor Phillips Barrett	For service to the community through roles within the adult education sector.
John Robert Barwick	For service to the community, particularly through the Uniting Church in Australia.
Thomas John Bascombe	For service to the community of the Eyre Peninsula.
Ryley Douglas Batt	For service to sport as a gold medallist at the London 2012 Paralympic Games.
Luigi Bazzani	For service to the food and wine tourism industry.
Andrew Garth Beadle	For service to the civil aviation industry, particularly air traffic management.
Julian John Beaumont	For service to the arts, and to health and care of the aged community.
Dr Jurriaan Jan Beek	For service to medicine, and to the community.
Mathew Anthony Belcher	For service to sport as a gold medallist at the London 2012 Olympic Games.
Charles Frederic Belford	For service to the community of Western Australia.
Eric John Beautel	For service to the community of Caboolture.
Beverley Narelle Bird	For service to music, and to the community of Albany.
M Shirley Bishop	For service to the community of Gympie.
Dorothy May Blacker	For service to the community of Cobar.
Robert McChristie Blacklow	For service to the arts through the production of fine furniture and marquetry.
Allan William Bligh	For service to general aviation.
Ian Henry Bock	For service to the arts through a range of photographic associations, and to the community.
Norman Bodinnar	For service to the community of Nyah West.
Bruce John Bolam	For service to the community of Bathurst.
Christopher Adam Bond	For service to sport as a gold medallist at the London 2012 Paralympic Games.
Michael James Bourke	For service to the community of Trafalgar.
Peter William Boyer	For service to conservation and the environment, particularly in the field of climate science.
Jennifer Anne Bradbury	For service to nursing, and to the Goulburn Valley community.
Jane Kristine Bridges	For service to education through support for Indigenous needs within the Catholic education system.
Carole Anne Broadhead	For service to the Sapphire Coast community, and to charitable organisations.
Dr Belinda Jane Brown	For service to medicine in the field of breast cancer treatment.
Elsie May Brown	For service to the community, particularly through charitable and church organisations.
Dr James Boyner Brown	For service to medical education, and to the community.
Gillian Jayne Brownhill	For service to the conservation of Australian fauna.
Anthony Malcolm Bruce	For service to veterans and their families, and to the community.
William Francis Buckle	For service to the motor vehicle industry as a designer and retailer
Rhonda Suzanne Burchmore	For service to the performing arts, and to the community.
Leonie Ruth Burgess	For service to highland dancing.
John Burke	For service to athletics.
Donald Hamish Cameron	For service to the entertainment industry.
Cate Natalie Campbell	For service to sport as a gold medallist at the London 2012 Olympic Games.
Peter McEachern Campbell	For service to yachting as a journalist.
Guido Canale BEM	For service to the Italian community.
Maureen Louise Capp	For service to the community of Melbourne, particularly through advocacy roles for residents.
John Robert Carlyon	For service to the welfare of veterans and their families.
Cameron Michael Carr	For service to sport as a gold medallist at the London 2012 Paralympic Games
Eric Ronald Carrigan	For service to the community, particularly to people with a disability.
Caroline Mary Carroll	For service to the community, particularly to persons raised in institutional or other out-of-home care.
David Burleigh Carter	For service to veterans and their families.
Kelly Anne Cartwright	For service to sport as a gold medallist at the London 2012 Paralympic Games.
Peter "Clary" Castrission	For service to international relations through providing educational opportunities to people in India.
Dr Graham William Cato	For service to community health, and to surf lifesaving.
John Victor Chandler	For service to local government, and to the City of Stonnington
Christopher Tony Chant	For service to the community of Albury through a range of community organisations.
Andrew Lachlan Chapman	For service to the arts as a photographer.
Clifford Lawrence Chapman	For service to veterans, and to the community.
Michael Donald Chapman	For service to music as a songwriter, producer and teacher.
Neville Donald Charlton	For service to the community of the Central Coast.
Keith Chenhall	For service to the community of Traralgon.
Doreen Gladys Cherry	For service to the community of the North Shore.
Dean Nelson Chaflin	For service to marine and maritime art.
Neville John Clark MC	For service to education.
Christine Helen Clausen	For service to the community through creative support for charitable and health organisations.
Jacob Peter Clear	For service to sport as a gold medallist at the London 2012 Olympic Games.
Susan Cleary PSM	For service to civil liberties advocacy, and to the Glebe community.
Marie Edith Clements	For service to the community, particularly through a range of health and disability support organisations.
Blake John Cochrane	For service to sport as a gold medallist at the London 2012 Paralympic Games.
Brenda Joyce Cochrane	For service to the preservation of the marine environment.
Ellie Victoria Cole	For service to sport as a gold medallist at the London 2012 Paralympic Games.
Maureen Margaret Colgan	For service to the community through a range of organisations.
John Cook	For service to people with Meniere's disease, and to people with vision impairments.
Noele Rosemary Cook	For service to the community, particularly through advancement of the status of women.
Philip William Cooper	For service to the insurance industry, and to the Scouting movement.
Amy Patricia Cordwell	For service to the community of Yandina.
Temple Beverley Cornish	For service to the Uniting Church in Australia, and to the community of Orange.
Alicia Jayne Coutts	For service to sport as a gold medallist at the London 2012 Olympic Games.
Geoffrey Bruce Cramer	For service to the recreational fishing industry in Victoria.
Helen Creagh	For service to the community of Mundaring.
Douglas Norman Cremer	For service to the arts as an administrator.
Howard Mackay Croker	For service to the sport of rowing.
Kevin Charles Croker	For service to the Catholic Church in the Archdiocese of Canberra and Goulburn.
Ellen Iris Cuff	For service to the blind and those with low vision.
Donald Maxwell Culley	For service to the community of Buderim.
Christine Cumpsty	For service to youth through the Scouting movement.
Ken Cunningham	For service to the community of Balaklava.
Michael John Curry	For service to veterans.
Kay Danes	For service to the community through promoting social justice and human rights.
James Edmund Davern	For service to television as a writer, director and producer.
Honey Davey	For service to the community, particularly to women and youth, through social welfare programs.
Gael Davies	For service to the arts, and to the community.
Dr Margaret Davies	For service to science in the field of herpetology.
Meg Davoren-Honey	For service to the visual arts, and to the community.
Andrew John Dawes	For service to athletics as a wheelchair track and road coach.
Nicholas Grant Dean	For service to sport, particularly athletes with a disability.
Ronald Edward "Ron" De Cruz	For service to the community of Christmas Island.
Kevin James Deem	For service to the community of Bundaberg through sports administration.
Raelene Denham	For service to the community through St John Ambulance.
Richard Alan Dent	For service to people with a disability.
Jack Andrew Dickenson	For service to the community of Eden.
Richard William "Bill" Dixon †	For service to the community of north western Sydney.
Peter John Doak	For service to sport, and to the community of Geelong.
Barbara Frances "Babs" Donaldson	For service to the community of the Riverina.
Neil Kirkwan Donaldson	For service to Australian rules football in Western Australia.
Joseph D'Onofrio	For service to the sport of fencing.
James William Dougherty	For service to surf lifesaving, and to the community.
Paul Dovico	For service to accountancy, and to the community.
Katherine Rose Downie	For service to sport as a gold medallist at the London 2012 Paralympic Games.
John Henry Dowse	For service to the welfare of the aged through a range of health initiatives.
Wendy Margaret Drowley	For service to the performing arts.
Robert William Duncan	For service to business and commerce, and to the community.
Lucinda Joanne Dunn	For service to the performing arts through ballet.
Glenn Dwarte	For service to the community of Illawarra through philanthropic works.
Katia Mary Dwarte	For service to the community of Illawarra through philanthropic works.
Jillian Isobel Dwyer	For service to the arts as a voluntary guide and administrator
Edith Helen Edmonds	For service to the community through the arts.
Elizabeth Ann Edwards	For service to veterans.
Pastor Mark Llewelyn Edwards	For service to the church, and to the community of Ipswich.
Alan George Eley AFSM	For service to the community of Echuca.
Robyn Yvonne Elkington	For service to youth.
Maddison Gae Elliott	For service to sport as a gold medallist at the London 2012 Paralympic Games.
Margaret Glendon Ellis	For service to the community of Kyogle.
Brittany Joyce Elmslie	For service to sport as a gold medallist at the London 2012 Olympic Games.
Dr Imad Mark Eltenn	For service to the community, and to dentistry.
David John Epper	For service to children affected by the autism spectrum, and to the community.
Nazim Erdem	For service to sport as a gold medallist at the London 2012 Paralympic Games.
Timothy John Erickson	For service to race walking.
Kevin Francis Erwin	For service to social welfare through the provision of humanitarian aid in Vietnam.
E Doug Evans	For service to the communities of Wangaratta and Yarrawonga Mulwala.
Wayne Henry Evans	For service to the law, and to the community of the Mid-North Coast.
Kenneth William Falconer	For service to the community of Doncaster.
William Geoffrey Falkenberg	For service to primary industry through executive roles with apiculture associations.
Adrian Brett Farquharson	For service to youth, and to the community.
Ann Shirley Ferguson	For service to local government, and to the community.
Colin Latham Ferguson	For service to the community.
Kendall Murray Ferguson	For service to the community of Putty.
Reginald John "Reg" Ferguson	For service to the community of Dubbo.
Adrian Giacomo Fini	For service to the arts in Western Australia.
Daniel Gerard Fitzgibbon	For service to sport as a gold medallist at the London 2012 Paralympic Games.
Jane Christina Flemming	For service to athletics, and to the community.
Dolace Frances Ford †	For service to the community as an advocate for animal rights.
Joann Helen Formosa	For service to sport as a gold medallist at the London 2012 Paralympic Games.
Winston Fraser	For service to the community through service groups.
Dr Christopher Moses Fredericks	For service to dentistry, particularly in rural and remote areas.
Jacqueline Rose Freney	For service to sport as a gold medallist at the London 2012 Paralympic Games.
Esther Gayle Frenkiel	For service to the Jewish community.
Katherine Jean Fullagar	For service to netball in New South Wales.
Patricia Vincent Galligan	For service to the community through service groups.
Walter Henry George	For service to the community, particularly as a budgerigar breeder and judge.
Adrian Gibson	For service to the arts, to agriculture, and to the Parliament of Australia.
Averil Hope Gibson †	For service to the community of the Blue Mountains, and to infant health in remote areas.
John Peter Gillett	For service to the community of the Eurobodalla Shire.
Leonard Eric Glastnbury	For service to the community, particularly through Meals on Wheels.
Barbara Godwin	For service to education, and to the Anglican Church in Australia.
Lucy "Norma" Gordon	For service to the community, particularly through floral art organisations.
Albert Green	For service to athletes with a disability.
Colin Charles Green	For service to education in Victoria.
Joan Margaret Green	For service to the community, particularly through the heritage and conservation of historic properties.
Dr Darryl John Gregor	For service to ophthalmology, and to education.
Fay Ellen Griffin	For service to the community, particularly through the provision of financial support programs.
Carol Fleur Grigg	For service to families affected by Aspergers syndrome.
Jacob Israel Gringlas	For service to the Jewish community, and to education, particularly through philanthropic works.
The Reverend David Arthur Groves	For service to international relations, and to the Baptist Union of Australia
Norma Grubb	For service to the community of Benalla through a range of organisations.
Radhey Shyam Gupta	For service to the arts through classical Indian music.
William Rawson Gye	For service to the community of Scotland Island.
Matthew Anthony Haanappel	For service to sport as a gold medallist at the London 2012 Paralympic Games.
Barry Albert Hall	For service to the community as an entertainer and radio announcer.
Brenden John Hall	For service to sport as a gold medallist at the London 2012 Paralympic Games.
Professor Ruth Milne Hall	For service to science in the field of microbiology.
Virginia Hall	For service to the community of Townsville through a range of volunteer organisations.
Susan Joy Halmagyi †	For service to conservation and the environment.
David Elliott Ham	For service to education, and to the community through voluntary roles.
Vicki Dorothy Hamilton	For service to the community through support for people with asbestos-related diseases.
Suzanne Laura Hampel	For service to the community through the promotion of understanding and tolerance.
Merridee June Hardinge	For service to the community of Hobsons Bay
Dr Peter William Harries	For service to the media industry as a television entertainer and producer, and to the community.
Raymond Brian Harrington	For service to primary industry, particularly in the development of agricultural machinery
Andrew John Harrison	For service to sport as a gold medallist at the London 2012 Paralympic Games.
Spencer Wallace Harvey	For service to the community, and to education.
Courtney Robert Hawke	For service to the community of Orange, particularly through a range of arts organisations.
Dr Timothy Francis Hawkes	For service to education, and to professional organisations.
Anthony John Hay	For service to local government, and to the community.
Marjory Jean Hayes	For service to the community of the Wynnum region.
Andrew Stewart Hegh	For service to the construction industry, and to the community of Mount Isa.
Margaret Anne Hemmings	For service to the community of Chapman.
Leonie Catherine Hempton	For service to the community through music.
Neville James Henderson	For service to youth, and to the community of western Sydney.
Stanley Charles Henke	For service to the communities of Minyip, Rupanyup and Murtoa.
Christina Karen Hindhaugh	For service to the community of Balmoral, and to women in agriculture.
Edna Joan Hindle	For service to the community of Theodore.
Rosanna Russell Hindmarsh	For service to the community of the Australian Capital Territory.
Valerie Hobson	For service to the community through the preservation of the history of the Western Australian shearing industry
Alan Hodge †	For service to the communities of Table Top and Albury
Todd Hodgetts	For service to sport as a gold medallist at the London 2012 Paralympic Games.
John Robert Holt	For service to sport, particularly through surf lifesaving, ironman and triathlon competitions and administration.
William Patrick Hopkins	For service to industrial relations, and to the community.
Olga Horak	For service to the Jewish community.
Rachel Anne Hore	For service to the community through choral music.
Major James Charlton Horton (Retired)	For service to veterans and their families.
Joshua Anthony Hose	For service to sport as a gold medallist at the London 2012 Paralympic Games.
Dr John Roland Howes	For service to education, and to the community.
John Donald Howie	For service to the community of Mansfield.
George William Hudson	For service to the community of Bicheno.
Rupert Osman Hudson	For service to the community, and to rugby league football.
Harold John Hunt	For service to Indigenous communities in New South Wales.
Carmel Margaret Hurst	For service to aged care, particularly through innovative housing programs.
John Graeme Ingram	For service to the refugee community.
Betty Margaret Ireland	For service to nursing, and to the community of Balmain.
Thomas Eric Jacob	For service to the community through philanthropic contributions to a range of organisations.
John Quentin Jeffries	For service to the community, particularly to people with a disability.
Iain Valjean Jensen	For service to sport as a gold medallist at the London 2012 Olympic Games.
Ronald Geoffrey Johanson	For service to the arts, particularly as a cinematographer and film director.
Felicity Jane Johnson	For service to sport as a gold medallist at the London 2012 Paralympic Games.
James Edward Johnston	For service to the community of East Gippsland through a range of organisations.
Richard Raymond Johnston	For service to the sport of rugby league football as a referee and as an administrator.
Robin William Jones	For service to veterans.
William Rex Jory	For service to journalism, and to the community of South Australia.
Gregory Michael Joseph ASM	For service to the community of Moonta.
Robert Alan Joske	For service to the entertainment and sports industries.
Roslyn Mary Joslin	For service to the community of the Australian Capital Territory.
Associate Professor Marie Rose Joyce	For service to psychology as an educator and practitioner, to the disadvantaged and homeless, and to refugees.
Christopher Peter Keating	For service to the welfare of veterans and their families.
John Anthony Keeffe	For service to motor sports, and to the community.
Earl Kelaher	For service to the welfare of veterans and their families, and to the community of Liverpool.
Noel Trevor Kelk	For service to the community through the surf lifesaving movement.
Leo Keller	For service to the arts, particularly choral music.
Maureen Anne Kelly	For service to Indigenous communities in Western Australia.
David Neil Kempe	For service to the community, and to cricket.
Paul John Kennedy	For service to conservation and the environment.
The Reverend Father Kevin Kerley	For service to the international community through humanitarian roles in Papua New Guinea.
Andrew Patrick Kerr	For service to the community, and to water polo.
Associate Professor James Forrester King	For service to medicine, particularly in the field of perinatal epidemiology.
Paul Arthur King	For service to the community of Inverell through a range of social welfare programs.
Annamaria Eva Kinnon	For service to the arts as an administrator and benefactor.
Cameron James Kiss	For service to the international community through a range of humanitarian assistance roles.
Elmer Knobel	For service to the community of Moree.
Cheryl Jane Koenig	For service to people with disabilities, their families and carers.
Kay Frances Kolsky	For service to hockey, particularly as a coach and mentor.
Judith Ann Kranen	For service to veterans and their families.
Yolane Nicole Kukla	For service to sport as a gold medallist at the London 2012 Olympic Games.
Terence Francis Lane	For service to the arts, particularly fine and decorative art.
William Man-Chick Lau	For service to the Chinese community in Victoria.
Christopher Jebaratnam Lawton	For service to the Sri Lankan community.
Carmen Lazar	For service to the Assyrian community.
Lester William Leaman	For service to the community through the Scouting movement, and to men's health programs.
Colin James Lee	For service to the community of the Ballina region.
Heather Lee	For service to athletics through masters race walking, and to the community.
Colonel John Hamilton Lee RFD, ED (Retired)	For service to veterans, and to the community of Mentone.
Associate Professor L Slade Lee	For service to science, particularly biological research.
Nellie Lee	For service to the community of Bellingen through church, social welfare and veterans organisations.
Pieter Diedrich Leeflang PSM	For service to the Dutch community of Western Australia.
Jason Peter Lees	For service to sport as a gold medallist at the London 2012 Paralympic Games.
Irene Gloria Leighton	For service to the communities of Bowden and Brompton.
David Frederick Leonard	For service to the community of Nundle.
Joyce Elaine Leslie	For service to the community of the Onkaparinga Valley.
Matthew John Levy	For service to sport as a gold medallist at the London 2012 Paralympic Games.
David Lithgow Lewis	For service to people with a disability, particularly through international aid programs.
David James Liddiard	For service to Indigenous youth, sporting and employment programs.
Dr John Lindsey	For service to medicine as a consultant physician.
Fay Lorraine Linnett	For service to the community of Ivanhoe.
Dr Peter David Livingstone	For service to medicine as an anaesthetist.
Fred Lizzio	For service to the communities of Babinda and Innisfail.
William James Llewellyn	For service to the community of Ballarat.
Kristina Ellen Lloyd	For service to education.
Barbara Fay Long	For service to netball.
Felicity Anne Lord	For service to the community through the promotion of equal opportunities for women.
David John Lovell†	For service to local government in Tasmania.
June Elizabeth Lupton	For service to the community of Rosebery.
Kevin Charles Lupton	For service to the community of Rosebery.
Marjory Janet McCormack	For service to the community of Leeton.
The Reverend Dr Timothy Ross McCowan	For service to the community through interfaith programs.
Maree Carol McDermott	For service to the community of Western Sydney, particularly through social welfare organisations.
Anthony James McEnearney	For service to the community through social welfare organisations.
John Francis McEvoy	For service to education, and to the community of Wodonga.
Geoffrey William McGeary	For service to tourism.
Ronald Neil McGlinchey	For service to the community of Boulia Shire, and to local government.
Ronald William McGrath	For service to veterans.
Daniel William McGurgan	For service to the community of Cadell.
Douglas James McIntyre	For service to the transport industry, and to the community.
Lucille Mildred McKenna	For service to nursing in New South Wales, and to local government.
Ron McLean	For service to journalism as an editor, and to the community.
Scott Matthew McPhee	For service to sport as a gold medallist at the London 2012 Paralympic Games.
Duncan John McPherson	For service to harness racing, and to community health organisations.
Jack Nguyen Ma	For service to the Chinese community of Victoria.
Andrew Henry Mackenzie	For service to the community of Marysville, to the arts, and to the preservation of local history.
Jill Madew	For service to the community of Adaminaby.
Lyn Magee	For service to people with a disability, and to the community.
Richard William Magnus	For service to the Jewish community, and to the catering industry.
The Reverend Father Peter Desmond Maher	For service to religion, and to the community through a range of programs promoting acceptance and diversity.
Stephen Andrew Manos	For service to the Greek community.
David Michael Manzi	For service to the community of the Blue Mountains.
Mary Gertrude Marley	For service to hockey as an administrator.
Loretta Josephine Marron	For service to community health.
Luke Leonard Marsden	For service to medicine in the field of podiatry.
Peter Martin	For service to veterans and their families, and to the community of the Echuca region.
Noel Maughan	For service to the Parliament of Victoria, to agriculture, and to rural health.
Lynette Joan Mayo	For service to the community of the Mid North Coast.
Cody Meakin	For service to sport as a gold medallist at the London 2012 Paralympic Games.
Dr Paul Andrew Mees	For service to public transport and urban planning as an academic and advocate for creating sustainable cities.
Peter Mercer	For service to local government, and to the community of Colac-Otway.
Lyndey Shirley Milan	For service to hospitality, particularly the food and wine industry, and to the community.
Dr Janis Ann Milburn	For service to education, and to veterans and their families.
Dr Brian David Mills	For service to higher education, and to the community.
Jim Milloy	For service to the community of Morawa, and to Australian rules football.
John Joseph Moran	For service to the community through involvement in charitable organisations.
Andrew "Drew" Morphett	For service to sport as a radio and television commentator, broadcaster and presenter.
Stephanie Morton	For service to sport as a gold medallist at the London 2012 Paralympic Games.
Ailsa Moyle	For service to the arts in the community of Innisfail.
Judith Muir	For service to the environment and to tourism in the Mornington Peninsula area.
Bernadine Mulholland	For service to community health as a physiotherapist.
Reginald Schilling Munchenberg	For service to the community of Truro and district through a range of historical, community and agricultural organisations.
George Robert Munro	For service to sport through administrative and coaching roles with basketball and wrestling organisations.
Peter Murray Murton	For service to information technology, and to the community.
Leslie John Nankervis	For service to athletics, particularly through coaching roles.
Rex Nankervis	For service to the community of Benalla.
Carolyn Gwen Nasser	For service to people with a disability in Queensland.
The Reverend Father John Lawrence Neill	For service to education, and to the Catholic Church in Australia.
Janette Elizabeth Neilson	For service to local government, and to the community of the Bega Valley.
Dr Romney Adair Newman	For service to medicine as a physician, and to the community.
Benaiah Thomas Newton	For service to sport as a gold medallist at the London 2012 Paralympic Games.
Tay Van Nguyen	For service to veterans and their families.
David Aron Nicholas	For service to sport as a gold medallist at the London 2012 Paralympic Games.
Angelo Lambrinos Notaras	For service to the Greek community, particularly through the Greek Orthodox Archdiocese of Australia.
Bryan Nye	For service to the rail transport industry, and to the business sector.
William Andrew Oakley	For service to the community through voluntary roles with youth, service and recreational organisations.
Barry John O'Brien	For service to the community through a variety of charitable organisations, and to the media industry.
Robert John O'Neill	For service to social welfare, to the disadvantaged, and to the community.
Rodney Stephen O'Reagan	For service to the welfare of veterans and their families, and to military history.
Alan William Ould	For service to the community of Benalla.
Nathan James Outteridge	For service to sport as a gold medallist at the London 2012 Olympic Games.
Anthony Scott Oxford ASM	For service to the community, particularly through St John Ambulance Victoria.
Dr David Alan Parker	For service to dentistry.
Desmond Reece Parker	For service to the media, and to the community.
Gwen Parker	For service to the community of Glen Innes.
Michael Ronald Parslow	For service to tennis.
Andrew Bruce Pasterfield	For service to sport as a gold medallist at the London 2012 Paralympic Games.
Dr Noel John Patterson	For service to the advancement of the chiropractic profession.
William Payne	For service to the community through reform of radio communications regulation.
Philip Lucas Peach	For service to business and commerce as a designer and manufacturer.
Sally Pearson	For service to sport as a gold medallist at the London 2012 Olympic Games.
Denis Percy	For service to the community, and to recognition of international policing.
William Alex Pewtress	For service to cricket.
Robert Samuel Phillips	For service to the community, particularly through commemoration of the Rats of Tobruk.
John Kenneth Pochee	For service to music as a jazz musician.
Dr James Byrne Pollitt	For service to medicine as a general practitioner, and to the community.
David Peter Pool	For service to the community, and to emergency services.
Dr Susan Jennifer Powell	For service to sport as a gold medallist at the London 2012 Paralympic Games.
Thomas Stephen Power	For service to the Irish community, particularly through commemoration of the Great Irish Famine.
Ken Preiss†	For service to conservation and the environment, and to the community.
Pastor Grahame Edward Pricter	For service to the Scouting movement, and to the Uniting Church.
William Ross Pulling	For service to veterans and their families.
Associate Professor Geoffrey Grant Quail	For service to medicine, particularly through dentistry.
Ronald James Quinton	For service to the horseracing industry.
George Baseem Rabie	For service to the Penrith community.
Marie Veronica Radford	For service to Catholic education, and to the community.
Professor George Ramsey-Stewart	For service to surgical education.
Michael Randall	For service to disadvantaged youth.
Antonio Randazzo	For service to business, and to the community.
Giuseppe "Joe" Randazzo	For service to business, and to the community.
Garry Reed	For service to sport in the Willunga region.
Anne Reid	For service to the Jewish community of Sydney.
David Arthur Reid	For service to the promotion of bushwalking, and to the community.
Leonie Reid	For service to people in Perth with a disability.
Maree Anne Rennie	For service to the education of deaf children, particularly those with additional needs, and to their families.
James Michael Reyne	For service to the performing arts as a singer/songwriter, and through support for a range of charitable organisations.
Patricia Loris Richardson	For service to women, and to the community of Nambucca Heads.
Marie Therese Riley	For service to the community, particularly as a historian and author.
Kevin Peter Riolo	For service to rugby league football.
Lieutenant Commander Ronald Keith Robb RAN (Retired)	For service to the Baptist Church in New South Wales, particularly as an archivist.
Kevin Lewis Roberts	For service to the community, particularly through Rotary International.
Shirley Anne Roberts	For service to the community, particularly through Rotary International.
John Ormiston Robertson	For service to the performing arts as a producer and mentor.
Babara Irene Robinson	For service to the community as an advocate for human rights.
Raymond Keith Rochow	For service to the community through sporting, child and aged care organisations.
Josephine Ann Rogers	For service to Australian rules football.
Murray John Rogers	For service to sports administration, and to the community of Ipswich.
Antonio Rosa	For service to the Australian-Italian community of Brisbane.
John Kenneth Ross	For service to local government, and to the community.
Warren Eric Rosser	For service to judo.
Craig Ernest Rossiter	For service to veterans and their families.
Patricia Elsie Rubenach	For service to the communities of Fingal and Hobart.
Jennie Russell	For service to women's affairs, and to the community.
Susan "Sue" Sacker	For service to people with a mental illness, to local government, and to the community of Manly.
Shirley Porter Sampson	For service to the community through a range of organisations.
Robert Schofield	For service to the community, particularly through local government.
John Lewis Schumann	For service to music, and to the veteran community.
Jean Farley Scott	For service to the community, and to local government.
Ryan Scott	For service to sport as a gold medallist at the London 2012 Paralympic Games.
Joseph James Seddon†	For service to surf lifesaving.
Kenneth Ian Semmler	For service to the community, and to education through the Lutheran Church of Australia.
Michael Shapiro	For service to the community of Rose Bay.
Warren James Sharpe	For service to engineering, and to the community.
Roderick James Shearing	For service to geography.
Peter Anthony Sheedy	For service to engineering, particularly in the field of non-destructive testing.
Alan Frederick Sherlock OBE	For service to the Scouting movement, and to the community.
Paul Anthony Sherman	For service to the arts as a poet and playwright, and to education.
Lindsay Ronald Showyin	For service to the manufacturing industry, and to professional associations.
Zita Wilton Sidaway	For service to the community, particularly women's affairs.
Noela Mary Sikora	For service to the community.
Robert Charles Sim	For service to the community through a range of organisations.
Kumarasamy Sivakumar	For service to education.
Lilly Anne Skurnik	For service to the community, particularly those with low vision.
Thomas David Slingsby	For service to sport as a gold medallist at the London 2012 Olympic Games.
Michael Harvey Smee	For service to education, and to the community.
Ann Valerie Smith	For service to the community through the mental health sector.
David William Smith	For service to sport as a gold medallist at the London 2012 Olympic Games.
Tate Aaron Smith	For service to sport as a gold medallist at the London 2012 Olympic Games.
Margaret Patricia Snodgrass	For service to the community of Willoughby.
Janet Somerville-Collie	For service to the community of Western Sydney.
Father William Terrence "Terry" Southerwood	For service to the Catholic Church in Tasmania, and as an author of historical and religious publications.
David William Spethman	For service to local military history.
Margaret Ann Spinks	For service to the community of Hunters Hill.
Shirley Stanbury	For service to music, and to the community of Busselton.
Robert James Stanley	For service to motor sport.
Jean Sudan St Clair	For service to nursing, and to the community of Goondiwindi.
Philip Andrew Stenhouse	For service to the community through youth support programs.
Allan Barry Stephen	For service to the blind, and to people with low vision.
The Honourable Tom Stephens	For service to Indigenous affairs, and to the Parliament of Western Australia.
Brian Malcolm Stevenson	For service to the community.
Geoffrey Stewart	For service to the mining industry.
Murray Scott Stewart	For service to sport as a gold medallist at the London 2012 Olympic Games.
Norman Valentine St Leon AE	For service to aviation, and to the community.
Rosemary Stockley	For service to the welfare of veterans and their families.
Dr Oskar Günther Stünzner	For service to the livestock industry in Samoa and the Pacific region.
Mark Raymond Sutherland	For service to the community of Marysville, particularly after the 2009 Victorian fires.
John Clive Symonds	For service to the community of Wynyard.
Geoffrey Leonard Tamblyn	For service to cricket.
Pieta Anne Thornton	For service to victims and witnesses of crime.
Ray Douglas Titus	For service to the media as a sports photographer.
Dale Robert Tolliday	For service to the community through the provision of social welfare services.
Catriona Bowen Tonacia	For service to mental health through programs to address post-traumatic stress disorder.
Dr Christine Ellen Tracey-Patte	For service to women's affairs.
Dennis Robert Trigg	For service to the community of Lake Macquarie.
Dr John Charles Vance	For service to the blind, and to people with low vision.
John Vinall	For service to the community of Gippsland.
Dr Peter Robert Wakeford	For service to medicine, and to the community.
Helen Marion Walker	For service to people with disabilities.
Kathryn Walker	For service to early childhood education.
Dr Richard Howell Walkey	For service to medicine as a General Practitioner, and to the community.
Dorothy Elizabeth Ward	For service to the community, particularly through the Country Women's Association of Victoria.
Ian Charles Waters	For service to youth through the Scouting movement.
Prudence Elise Watt	For service to sport as a gold medallist at the London 2012 Paralympic Games.
Associate Professor Bruce Philip Waxman	For service to medicine as an administrator, educator and clinician.
Robert Travers "Bob" Weaver	For service to the community, particularly through nursing in mental health and disability services.
David Wells	For service to the preservation of cricket history.
Max Wells	For service to surfing, and to the community.
Susan Elizabeth Whelan	For service to local government, and to the community of the Queanbeyan region.
Michael White	For service to the community of Wellington.
Sian Alexandra White	For service to international relations, particularly through tuberculosis prevention programs in the Pacific region.
Raymond Whiting	For service to the community of Gerringong.
Beverley Joy Wild	For service to the communities of Woodford and Peachester.
Ivan George Wild	For service to the communities of Woodford and Peachester.
Annabelle Josephine Williams	For service to sport as a gold medallist at the London 2012 Paralympic Games.
Leon Roy Williams AFSM	For service to the community of Shepparton.
Gary Austin Wilson	For service to the community, particularly through Toastmasters International.
Jim Wilson	For service to the community of Glen Innes.
Tamara Winikoff	For service to the visual arts.
John Winterbottom	For service to the community as an historian.
Francis Wong Wi Yuong	For service to business, and to the community.
Helen Josephine Wood	For service to swimming through technical roles.
Irene Pohleng Wood	For service to community health.
Paul James Worthington	For service to the arts.
Dorothy Yuen Yiu	For service to the Chinese community through the support of cancer patients and carers.
Edward Roy Young	For service to the community, particularly as an advocate of human rights for gay and lesbian people.
Gordon Yuline	For service to the Indigenous community.

==== Military Division ====
Branch	Recipient	Citation
Navy	Chief Petty Officer Raymond John Beasy CSM	For meritorious service in the field of Naval Gunnery and Seamanship.
Navy	Commander Lewis Patrick Gaha RAN	For meritorious service as the Navy Reserve Career Manager, Elections Liaison Officer for the United Nations Assistance Mission in Iraq, Director of Navy Ministerial Coordination, and Director of Navy Reputation Management.
Army	Warrant Officer Class One Ian Albert D'arcy	For meritorious service as Regimental Sergeant Major of 9th Battalion, the Royal Queensland Regiment, 8th/9th Battalion, the Royal Australian Regiment, and the Mentoring Task Force Four in Afghanistan 2012.
Army	Warrant Officer Class One Matthew John Dingley	For meritorious service to the Australian Army in a variety of personnel management and force structure modernisation roles.
Army	Major Peter Morton Green	For meritorious service as Regimental Sergeant Major of the Incident Response Regiment, the 8th Combat Engineer Regiment, and the 16th Aviation Brigade.
Army	Major Jason Ross Gregson	For meritorious performance of duty as Operations Officer, 138th Signal Squadron, Officer-in-Charge of Force Protection, and Instructor in Advanced Training Wing of the Defence Force School of Signals.
Army	Warrant Officer Class Two Jason Glenn Stafford	For meritorious performance of duty as an Army Physical Training Instructor at the Royal Military College, and Manager Physical Training and Wing Sergeant Major to Trainee Rehabilitation Wing, School of Military Engineering.
Air Force	Warrant Officer Brenton Alan Bell	For meritorious service to the Royal Australian Air Force in leadership and safety
Air Force	Group Captain Carl Frederick Schiller CSM	For meritorious service to the Royal Australian Air Force in Reserve development and management.

== Meritorious Service ==
=== Public Service Medal (PSM) ===
Public Service Medal ribbon

Branch	Recipient
Australian Public Service	David Edward Banham
Australian Public Service	Dr Raymond Paul Canterford
Australian Public Service	Ms Kim Louise Clarke †
Australian Public Service	Ms Tania Joy Constable
Australian Public Service	Tony Robert Cook
Australian Public Service	Ms Rebecca Mary Cross
Australian Public Service	Dr Rhondda Gay Dickson
Australian Public Service	Dr Nicholas Gerrit Hartland
Australian Public Service	Ian Robert McKenzie
Australian Public Service	Dr Anthony Joseph McLeod
Australian Public Service	Ms Susan Lee Page
Australian Public Service	Dr Simon Pelling
Australian Public Service	Terance John Price
Australian Public Service	Anthony James Slatyer
New South Wales; Public Service	James Eugene Baldwin
New South Wales; Public Service	Christopher John Crawford
New South Wales; Public Service	Dr Robert Creese
New South Wales; Public Service	David John Evans
New South Wales; Public Service	Ms Heather Gray
New South Wales; Public Service	Mrs Rosemary Anne Hailstone
New South Wales; Public Service	Ted Hoare
New South Wales; Public Service	Christopher Denton Leach
New South Wales; Public Service	Robert Mulas
New South Wales; Public Service	Ross Henry O'Shea
New South Wales; Public Service	Mrs Rhondda Gai Vassallo
Victorian; Public Service	John Bennie
Victorian; Public Service	Ms Lynette Kaye Brown
Victorian; Public Service	Gregory Bruce Byrne
Victorian; Public Service	Bruce Thomas Colcott OAM
Victorian; Public Service	Garry Philip Ellis
Victorian; Public Service	Mrs Beverley Ann Garratt
Victorian; Public Service	Dr Rosemary Ann Lester
Victorian; Public Service	John Nimon Mooney
Victorian; Public Service	Dr Eugenie Mary Tuck OAM
Queensland; Public Service	Professor Michael Ian Cleary
Queensland; Public Service	Dale Robert Dickson
Queensland; Public Service	Dr Richard John Eden
Queensland; Public Service	Peter James Rourke
Queensland; Public Service	Dr Catherine Yelland
Western Australian; Public Service	Ms Elisabeth Harris
Western Australian; Public Service	William Albert Preston
Western Australian; Public Service	Ian Trevor Smith
South Australian; Public Service	Ms Pauline Mary Barnett
South Australian; Public Service	Barry Alan Goldtein
South Australian; Public Service	Mrs Pamela June Martin
Tasmanian; Public Service	Peter Rex Conway
Northern Territory; Public Service	Francis Gerard McGuiness
Northern Territory; Public Service	Dr Lorna Faye Melville AM

=== Australian Police Medal (APM) ===
Australian Police Medal ribbon

Branch	Recipient
Australian Federal Police	Detective Sergeant Therese Lauren Barnicoat
Australian Federal Police	Superintendent Brad Barton
Australian Federal Police	Assistant Commissioner Michael James Outram
New South Wales Police Force	Sergeant Glenn Roy Griffiths
New South Wales Police Force	Inspector Lynette Kaesler
New South Wales Police Force	Detective Inspector John Maricic
New South Wales Police Force	Detective Sergeant Andrew Paul Marks
New South Wales Police Force	Sergeant Robert Peter Minns
New South Wales Police Force	Detective Inspector Christopher Raymond Olen
New South Wales Police Force	Sergeant Karen Mercia Owen
New South Wales Police Force	Detective Superintendent Wayne George Starling
New South Wales Police Force	Inspector Richard Paul Steinborn
Victoria Police	Senior Sergeant Gregory John Davies
Victoria Police	Sergeant David John Dimsey
Victoria Police	Commander Douglas John Fryer
Victoria Police	Superintendent Brett Page Guerin
Victoria Police	Assistant Commissioner Tracy Linford
Victoria Police	Sergeant Deryn Caroline Ricardo
Queensland Police	Sergeant Kate Amelia Bailey
Queensland Police	Sergeant Dimitrios (Jim) Bellos
Queensland Police	Assistant Commissioner Robert William Gee
Queensland Police	Detective Senior Sergeant Kelly Harvey
Queensland Police	Senior Sergeant Erwin Hoffmann
Queensland Police	Inspector Ian Andrew Thompson
Western Australia Police	Superintendent Craig Robert Donaldson
Western Australia Police	Inspector Paul Gervase La Spina
Western Australia Police	Detective Inspector Kylie Maree Whiteley
South Australia Police	Detective Senior Sergeant Joanne Sharman
South Australia Police	Detective Chief Inspector Stephen John Taylor
South Australia Police	Senior Constable First Class Peter John Thompson
Tasmania Police	Inspector Glenn Anthony Lathey
Tasmania Police	Constable First Class Roderick Lee Warrington
Northern Territory Police	Detective Superintendent Tony James Fuller
Northern Territory Police	Detective Senior Sergeant Peter John Schiller

=== Australian Fire Service Medal (AFSM) ===
Australian Fire Service Medal ribbon

State	Recipient
New South Wales	Jennifer Gail Butt
New South Wales	Gerrard Anthony "Gerry" Byrne
New South Wales	Gregory Fredericks
New South Wales	William Arthur King
New South Wales	Sean McArdle
New South Wales	Charles Leslie May
New South Wales	Noel Waldo Scales
New South Wales	Graham John White
New South Wales	Christopher Wilhelm
New South Wales	Peter Edward Williams
Victoria	David John Gerrard
Victoria	Tony Lovick
Victoria	David Andrew Nugent
Victoria	Andrew Bernard O'Connell
Victoria	Peter Andrew Schmidt
Victoria	Michael Patrick Whitty
Queensland	Ian Aubrey Ames
Queensland	Kenneth Beasley
Queensland	Wally Gordon Gray
Queensland	Alan Gregory Jorgensen
Queensland	Peta Louise Miller-Rose
Queensland	Phillip Karl Paff
Western Australia	Brian Peter Landers
Western Australia	Gregory Alan Mair
Western Australia	Noel Raymond Plowman
South Australia	Yvette Lee Dowling
South Australia	Richard Peter Gray
South Australia	Michael John Morgan
South Australia	Joseph William Tilley
Tasmania	Hugh William Jones
Tasmania	Trevor Leslie Kingston
Tasmania	Rodney James Moore
Australian Capital Territory	Philip Ronald Canham
Northern Territory	Trevor Michael "Terry" Trewin

=== Ambulance Service Medal (ASM) ===
Ambulance Service Medal ribbon

State	Recipient
New South Wales	Stan Harrold
New South Wales	Murray Anthony Traynor BM
Victoria	Ralf Harries
Victoria	Grant Alan Hocking
Victoria	Sandra Mai Loats
Victoria	Peter William Phillips
Queensland	Lachlan Edward Parker
Queensland	Keith James Smith
Western Australia	Peter Montgomery
Western Australia	Ashley Gerard Morris
Western Australia	Peter Stuart Wood
South Australia	Robert James Elliott
Tasmania	Leigh Maxwell Higgins ESM
Tasmania	Gregory Roy Knowles
Tasmania	Jack van Dalen

=== Emergency Services Medal (ESM) ===
Emergency Services Medal ribbon

Branch	Recipient
New South Wales Emergency Services	Gina Marie Mammone
New South Wales Emergency Services	Raymond Bruce Willett
Victoria Emergency Services	Martin Stephen Forber
Victoria Emergency Services	Stanley Oliver Hendy
Queensland Emergency Services	Anthony John Fenner
Queensland Emergency Services	Margaret Ann Garbutt
Queensland Emergency Services	Wayne Derek Preeedy
Western Australia Emergency Services	Merrilyn May Hide
Western Australia Emergency Services	John Murray Iffla
South Australia Emergency Services	John Edge
South Australia Emergency Services	Theresa Esther Purvis
Tasmanian Emergency Services	Paul Branch
Tasmanian Emergency Services	Harold Deverell
Tasmanian Emergency Services	Susan Jane Powell
Northern Territory Emergency Services	Michelle Thomas

== Gallantry, Distinguished and Conspicuous Service ==
=== Medal for Gallantry (MG) ===
Medal for Gallantry ribbon

Branch	Recipient	Citation
Army	Corporal Michael Patrick Chalk	In the Tangi Valley, Afghanistan, Corporal Chalk's partnered patrol came under effective machine gun, sniper and small arms fire from an enemy force occupying dominating terrain. Corporal Chalk risked his life time and again by moving through open ground and enemy fire to support Afghan National Army soldiers, restoring order and confidence. His actions helped regain the initiative and undoubtedly saved lives.
Army	Sergeant 'J'	Following an improvised explosive device explosion in a compound in Helmand Province, Afghanistan, Sergeant J cleared safe paths to two casualties using only his bare hands and a mine prodder. He continued to clear and evacuate other members of the patrol to safety, discovering additional devices, recovering mission essential equipment and gathering intelligence. His actions undoubtedly saved lives. Sergeant J's gallantry in the most hazardous circumstances was of the highest order and in keeping with the finest traditions of the Australian Army and the Australian Defence Force.

=== Commendation for Gallantry ===
Commendation for Gallantry ribbon

Branch	Recipient	Citation
Army	Corporal Anthony Patrick Clarke	For acts of gallantry in action while commanding a high risk search team in the 3rd Battalion, the Royal Australian Regiment Task Group, in Khas Uruzgan, Afghanistan, on 2 September 2012.
Army	Private J	For acts of gallantry in action while on operations with the Special Operations Task Group on Operation SLIPPER.
Army	Private L	For acts of gallantry in action while on operations with the Special Operations Task Group on Operation SLIPPER.

=== Bar to the Distinguished Service Cross (DSC and Bar) ===
Distinguished Service Cross & Bar ribbon

Branch	Recipient	Citation
Army	Lieutenant Colonel I	For distinguished command and leadership in warlike operations as Commanding Officer of Special Operations Task Group on Operation SLIPPER.

=== Distinguished Service Cross (DSC) ===
Distinguished Service Cross ribbon

Branch	Recipient	Citation
Army	Major K	For distinguished command and leadership in warlike operations as an Officer Commanding with the Special Operations Task Group on Operation SLIPPER.

=== Distinguished Service Medal (DSM) ===
Distinguished Service Medal ribbon

Branch	Recipient	Citation
Army	Captain A	For distinguished leadership in warlike operations as an Officer Commanding with the Special Operations Task Group on Operation SLIPPER.
Army	Major Gregory John Colton	For distinguished leaders hip in warlike operations as Officer Commanding Mentoring Team Charlie, 3rd Battalion, the Royal Australian Regiment Task Group on Operation SLIPPER from June to November 2012.
Army	Major G	For distinguished leadership in warlike operations as an Officer Commanding with the Special Operations Task Group on Operation SLIPPER.
Army	Captain Anthony William Harris	For distinguished leadership in warlike operations as mobile advisory group commander in Mentoring Team Charlie, 3rd Battalion, the Royal Australian Regiment Task Group on Operation SLIPPER from June to November 2012.
Army	Colonel Benjamin Nicholas James AM	For distinguished leadership in warlike operations as part of Combined Team Uruzgan on Operation SLIPPER.
Army	Sergeant K	For distinguished leadership in warlike operations as a patrol commander with the Special Operations Task Group on Operation SLIPPER.
Army	Major L	For distinguished leadership in warlike operations as an Officer Commanding and as the Executive Officer with the Special Operations Task Group on Operation SLIPPER.
Army	Captain N	For distinguished leadership in warlike operations as a platoon commander with the Special Operations Task Group on Operation SLIPPER.

=== Commendation for Distinguished Service ===
Commendation for Distinguished Service ribbon

Branch	Recipient	Citation
Navy	Commander John Stavridis RAN	For distinguished performance of duty in warlike operations as Commanding Officer HMAS Anzac on Operation SLIPPER from June 2012 to January 2013.
Army	Corporal Steven Patrick Court	For distinguished performance of duty in warlike operations as the second-in-command of an infantry section in 3rd Battalion, the Royal Australian Regiment Task Group in Khas Uruzgan, Afghanistan, in August 2012.
Army	Lieutenant Colonel Brendan Patrick Cox	For distinguished performance of duty in warlike operations as Chief of Staff of the 205th Corps Coalition Advisory Team on Operation SLIPPER from March to September 2012.
Army	Brigadier Dianne Maree Gallasch AM CSC	For distinguished performance of duty in warlike operations as Director General Transition and Redeployment on Operation SLIPPER from January to December 2012.
Army	Lieutenant Colonel James Andrew Hammett	For distinguished performance of duty in warlike operations as the Chief of Staff, Headquarters Combined Team Uruzgan on Operation SLIPPER from January to October 2012.
Army	Captain N	For distinguished performance of duty in warlike operations as an Officer-in-Charge with the Special Operations Task Group on Operation SLIPPER.
Army	Lance Corporal Errol John Parsons	For distinguished performance of duty in warlike operations as an Engineer Search Brick Commander, Mentoring Task Force 4, in Afghanistan from January to July 2012.
Army	Major R	For distinguished performance of duty in warlike operations as an Officer Commanding with the Special Operations Task Group on Operation SLIPPER.
Army	Corporal Benjamin Roberts-Smith VC MG	For distinguished performance of duty in warlike operations as a patrol commander with the Special Operations Task Group on Operation SLIPPER.
Army	Lieutenant Colonel S	For distinguished performance of duty in warlike operations as an Officer Commanding with the Special Operations Task Group, and as a Special Operations Forces Staff Officer on Operation SLIPPER in Afghanistan.
Army	Major Phillip Whitehead	For distinguished performance of duty in warlike operations as Officer Commanding the 4th Brigade Operational Mentoring Liaison Team on Operation SLIPPER from January to June 2012.
Air Force	Air Commodore Christopher James Sawade CSC	For distinguished performance of duty in warlike operations as Deputy Commander Joint Task Force 633 on Operation SLIPPER from March to November 2012.

=== Bar to the Conspicuous Service Cross (CSC and Bar) ===
Conspicuous Service Cross and Bar ribbon

Branch	Recipient	Citation
Navy	Commander Jan Elizabeth Noonan CSC RAN	For outstanding achievement as Deputy Director Navy Category Management (Warfare).

=== Conspicuous Service Cross (CSC) ===
Conspicuous Service Cross ribbon

Branch	Recipient	Citation
Navy	Lieutenant Commander Richard John Foster RANR	For outstanding achievement as Project Officer at Training Authority-Aviation and the development of the Aviation Support Category training package.
Navy	Commander Lawrence Harry Stubbs RANR	For outstanding devotion to duty as Project Manager Fleet Regulatory Review Implementation Team in Fleet Command.
Army	Lieutenant Colonel David Anthony Bishop	For outstanding achievement as Staff Officer Grade One Legal at Headquarters Joint Operations Command.
Army	Lieutenant Colonel Glen Jeffrey Braithwaite	For outstanding achievement as Staff Officer Grade One-Base Support in the Directorate of Logistics-Army.
Army	Lieutenant Colonel David Lindsay Garside	For outstanding achievement as Staff Officer Grade One Joint Effects Plans at Headquarters Joint Operations Command.
Army	Sergeant J	For distinguished achievement and contribution to facilities management with the 2nd Commando Regiment.
Army	Lieutenant Colonel Amanda Alice Johnston	For outstanding achievement as a staff officer within Modernisation and Strategic Plans Division of Army Headquarters.
Army	Lieutenant Colonel David Anthony Lynch	For outstanding achievement in support of the fielding of the Armed Reconnaissance Helicopter from 2002 to 2012.
Army	Lieutenant Colonel Bradley Noel Orchard	For outstanding achievement as Staff Officer Grade One Workforce Reform within Personnel Branch-Army Headquarters.
Air Force	Wing Commander Karen Elizabeth Ashworth	For outstanding achievement in strategic personnel reform of the Royal Australian Air Force.
Air Force	Squadron Leader Anthony Mark Kay	For outstanding achievement as Staff Officer Force Generation, Headquarters Number 84 Wing.
Air Force	Squadron Leader Phillip Scott Mackie CSM	For outstanding devotion to duty as leader of the Propulsions Integrated Project Team within the Airlift Systems Program Office in support of operational capability.
Air Force	Wing Commander Colin Edward O'neil	For outstanding achievement as Deputy-Director for Air Mobility, Capability Development Group.

=== Conspicuous Service Medal (CSM) ===
Conspicuous Service Medal ribbon

Branch	Recipient	Citation
Navy	Petty Officer Philip Eric Andrew	For meritorious achievement as supervisor of the Circuit Card Assembly Test and Repair Facility-Fleet Support Unit West, and as an Electronics Technician in the rectification of defects on Collins Class Submarines and Surface Ships.
Navy	Petty Officer Mitch Ryan Atkins	For meritorious achievement as Marine Technician Instructor at the Training Unit, Anzac Ship Support Centre; developing the computer-based Anzac-class frigate Platform Training System for training Anzac class Marine Technicians.
Navy	Chief Petty Officer James David Bishop	For meritorious devotion to duty as Senior Technical Officer in ASSAIL SIX.
Navy	Leading Seaman Lauren Elizabeth King	For meritorious achievement as a Recruit School Instructor in HMAS Cerberus.
Navy	Warrant Officer Shannon Leigh Locke	For meritorious devotion to duty as Hydrographic Surveying Category Manager at the Directorate of Navy Category Management, Director General Navy People.
Navy	Commander Michael Samuel Oborn RAN	For meritorious achievement as the Executive Officer, HMAS Cerberus.
Navy	Chief Petty Officer Steven David Paterson	For meritorious devotion to duty as Chief Petty Officer Marine Technician in charge of propulsion systems in HMAS Warramunga while it was assigned to the Training Task Group.
Army	Lieutenant Colonel John Terence Bouloukos	For meritorious achievement as the Staff Officer Grade Two Sustainment within the Directorate of Logistics-Army.
Army	Corporal Rohan James Cowley	For meritorious achievement as Communications and Information Systems Detachment Commander for the Army Aboriginal Community Assistance Project 2012.
Army	Chaplain John Anthony Crosby	For meritorious devotion to duty as Chaplain of the 2nd Combat Engineer Regiment.
Army	Warrant Officer Class Two Paul Ronald Dabinet	For meritorious achievement as Manager Company Operations, Defence Science and Technology Organisation, while serving in the Modernisation and Strategic Plans-Army.
Army	Warrant Officer Class Two Paul Ashley Dehnert	For meritorious achievement as Reconnaissance Warrant Officer for Tactics Wing, School of Infantry.
Army	Sergeant Timothy Edwards Gray	For meritorious achievement as a Corporal Transport Supervisor in the 1st Combat Service Support Battalion and contribution to transport capability in the 1st Brigade.
Army	Colonel Russell John Maddalena	For meritorious achievement as Director of Operational Plans in Headquarters Joint Operations Command.
Army	Major John Francis Pearse	For meritorious achievement as Officer Commanding A Squadron (Victorian Mounted Rifles), 4th/19th Prince of Wales's Lighthorse Regiment.
Army	Warrant Officer Class Two Melinda Ann Price	For meritorious achievement as Chief Clerk of the 6th Brigade (Combat Support and Intelligence Surveillance Target Acquisition and Reconnaissance Group).
Army	Warrant Officer Class Two Graham Kenneth Roberts	For meritorious devotion to duty as Psychology Liaison Officer, Defence Force Recruiting.
Army	Warrant Officer Class One Clint William Robertson	For meritorious achievement as Artificer Sergeant Major of the 2nd Combat Engineer Regiment and the 2nd/14th Light Horse Regiment (Queensland Mounted Infantry).
Army	Sergeant S	For meritorious achievement and contribution to a specialist capability at the Special Air Service Regiment.
Army	Major Peter Nathan Scott	For meritorious achievement as the Personnel Operations and Personnel Plans Major at Headquarters 1st Division.
Air Force	Flight Sergeant Sean Alan Bell	For meritorious devotion to duty as a senior non-commissioned officer and Ground Systems Technical Lead for Project AIR5376 Phase 2 Stage 3 at Tactical Fighter Systems Program Office.
Air Force	Sergeant Ewan Gordon Eadie	For meritorious achievement as Unit and Facility Security Manager at Number 1 Squadron during the introduction to service of the F/A-18F Super Hornet.
Air Force	Squadron Leader Jason Malu Easthope	For meritorious achievement as Plans Officer Number 81 Wing Headquarters and as a tactical leader within Number 81 Wing.
Air Force	Warrant Officer Michelle Patricia Foley	For meritorious devotion to duty as Amberley Detachment Warrant Officer at Number 1 Combat Communications Squadron.
Air Force	Flight Lieutenant David John Savina	For meritorious achievement as Instructor at Surveillance and Control Training Unit.
Air Force	Sergeant Donovan Silverwood	For meritorious achievement as the Training Manager with in Project CORONIS, Electronic Systems Division, Defence Materiel Organisation.
Air Force	Sergeant Leeton Bruce Webb	For meritorious achievement as Senior Non-Commissioned Officer and Instructor at the Royal Australian Air Force School of Technical Training.

=== Meritorious Unit Citation ===
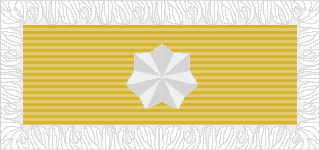
Meritorious Unit Citation

Branch	Recipient	Citation
Army	Force Communications Unit, Australian Defence Force	For sustained outstanding service in warlike operations through the provision of communications support to the United Nations Transitional Authority in Cambodia from 15 March 1992 to 7 October 1993.
