= Butow (surname) =

Butow or Bütow is a German surname that may refer to the following notable people:

- Alfred Bütow (1902–1986), German art director
- Hans Bütow (1894–1974), German admiral
- Phyllis Butow, Australian health psychology researcher
- Robert Butow (1924–2017), American historian of Japan
