= Butow =

Butow or Bütow may refer to

- Butow (surname)
- Bütow, a municipality in Mecklenburg-Vorpommern, Germany
- Bytów (German: Bütow), a town in northern Poland
- Lauenburg and Bütow Land, a historical region in Pomerania
