= Adele Rice =

Australian refugee advocate

Adele Rice AM
- Born: 1943; Bangalore, India
- Occupation: school principal (retired)
- Known for: being a founding principal of a school for migrant and refugee children

Adele Deidre Rice AM (born 1943) is an Indian-born Australian refugee advocate and retired school principal.

She is best known for being the founding principal of Milpera State High School in Brisbane, a school established in 1984 specifically for the children of refugees and migrants for whom English is a second language.

== Early life ==
Born in India during the second world war, Rice was the daughter of a woman with English, Irish and Dutch heritage and an Irishman who arrived India while serving with the British Army. After India gained independence, the family relocated to Australia. They left Bombay by ship, arriving in Sydney in 1948. Her family then travelled by train from Sydney to Brisbane.

From the age of five, Rice was a boarder at the Sister of Loreto Convent at Coorparoo. She then attended St Joseph's at Nundah followed by a year at All Hallows' School.

Rice then completed her secondary education at The Range Convent and High School in Rockhampton.

== Career ==
After finishing school, Rice pursued a teaching career and studied at Brisbane Teacher's College before commencing employment with the Department of Education where she remained for over fifty years.

She became the principal of Corinda Special School in 1979, leading the school which catered for non-English speaking secondary students around the time of Brisbane's Indo-Chinese influx.

Rice was awarded a Churchill Fellowship in 1984. She then established a teacher training program designed for specialist teachers.

In 1984, Rice became the founding principal of Milpera State High School at Chelmer, the only purpose-built school of its kind in Australia. Here, Rice led a school which had a fluctuating enrolment of approximately between 180 and 250 students who spoke up to 45 different languages.

Rice stayed with the school until her retirement in 2012.

Throughout her time as principal of the school, Rice was widely regarded for her work in ensuring children whose second language was English obtained their secondary education through specialist learning and settlement programs.

Despite retiring from teaching, Rice continues to be active in the community, serving in varying capacities with numerous organisations such as Heal Queensland, the Queensland Program of Assistance to Survivors of Torture and Trauma, St James College, Asylum Circle, and Global Citizen Education Network.

== Awards ==
Rice received the Save the Children White Flame Award in 2005 which was presented to her by Queensland's Minister for Child Safety Mike Reynolds during the 2005 Children's Week celebrations.

In 2008, the Queensland Minister for Multicultural Affairs Lindy Nelson-Carr named Rice as one of the state's "Multicultural Achievers" alongside hairdresser Stefan Ackerie, pole vaulter Tatiana Grigorieva, and musician Vasilini Lolo.

In 2011, Rice was a co-recipient of the inaugural Professor Betty Watts Memorial Award for Outstanding Contribution to Teaching.

In the 2014 Australia Day Honours, Rice was made a Member of the Order of Australia in recognition of her service to secondary education and to the migrant and refugee community.

Rice received an honorary Doctor of the University degree from the Queensland University of Technology in 2020.

In 2023, she was named as a Queensland Great.
