= John Sinclair (environmentalist) =

Australian environmentalist (1939–2019)

John Sinclair AO
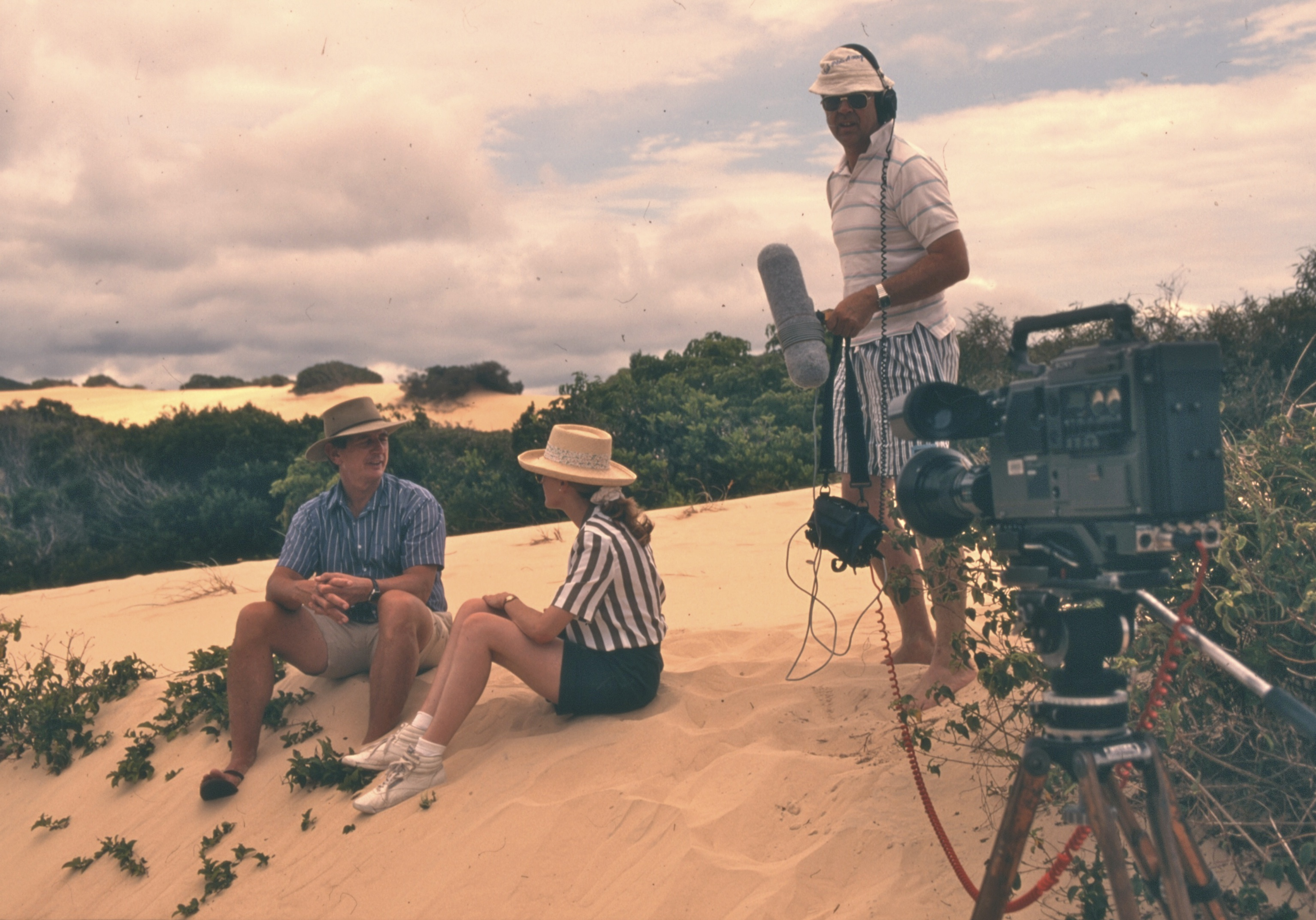
- Sinclair being interviewed by ABC TV in 1986
- Born: 13 July 1939; Maryborough, Queensland, Australia
- Died: 3 February 2019 (aged 79); Auchenflower, Queensland, Australia
- Awards: Global 500 Roll of Honour (1990); Goldman Environmental Prize (1993); Order of Australia (2014)

John Sinclair AO (13 July 1939 – 3 February 2019) was an Australian environmentalist who received the Global 500 Roll of Honour award in 1990, and was awarded the Goldman Environmental Prize in 1993.

== Early life ==
Born in Maryborough, Queensland, Australia, Sinclair fought for thirty years to protect Fraser Island, and succeeded in stopping logging of the island's rainforest, and sand mining by multinational corporations.

Sinclair was made an Officer of the Order of Australia (AO) in the 2014 Australia Day Honours for "distinguished service to conservation and the environment, through advocacy and leadership roles with a range of organisations, and to natural resource management and protection".

Sinclair died on 3 February 2019 in the Wesley Hospital in Auchenflower, Brisbane from prostate cancer. He is survived by his partner, four sons and nine grandchildren.
