= Rex Jory =

Australian journalist

Rex Jory OAM
- Born: William Rex Jory c. 1944; Adelaide
- Occupation: Journalist

William Rex Jory is a retired Australian journalist. He was an associate editor of The Advertiser, regular columnist for both The Advertiser and the Sunday Mail and leader writer for The Advertiser.

Jory was born and educated in Adelaide and joined The News as a copy boy in 1959. In 1965, he moved to London, working with the BBC. He spent a year in South Africa and returned to Adelaide in 1970 as political writer for The News. He was transferred to the Canberra bureau in 1978.

In 1983, he joined The Advertiser as a special writer. In 1984, he moved to The News and was made editor of the Sunday Mail. In 1986, he returned to The Advertiser, as political editor. In 1990, Jory was awarded a Jefferson Fellowship in the United States, and was appointed deputy editor of The Advertiser. In 1997, he became a daily columnist.

Jory was awarded the Medal of the Order of Australia (OAM) in the 2014 Australia Day Honours for "service to journalism, and to the community of South Australia".

Jory retired as a regular columnist in September 2019, 60 years and four months after starting as a copy boy at The News.
