= Ross Sundberg =

Australian judge

The Honourable Ross Alan Sundberg AM KC is a former judge in the Federal Court of Australia who served from 10 July 1995 to 9 August 2010.

One of his most notable rulings was in July 2000 in the case of McBain v State of Victoria. Sundberg ruled that the laws in Victoria restricting IVF treatment to married couples and de facto heterosexual couples were in violation of the 1984 Commonwealth Sex Discrimination Act. In 2011 he was the Judge in Residence at Ormond College.

Sundberg was appointed a Member of the Order of Australia in the 2014 Australia Day Honours.
