= Deo Prasad =

Fijian-Australian Academic Leader

Deo Prasad is an Australian academic in the fields of environment, sustainability and governance, with a focus on decarbonisation, clean energy and energy efficiency. Prasad was appointed an Officer of the Order of Australia in 2014. He is a Fellow of the Australian Academy of Technological Sciences and Engineering and a Fellow of the Royal Australian Institute of Architects.

Prasad is currently the chief executive officer of the NSW Decarbonisation Innovation Hub. He is the former CEO of the National Research and Innovation Hub for the Built Environment: CRC for Low Carbon Living. Deo was formerly the Lead Investigator and Director of the SOLARCH Group at University of New South Wales.

== Career ==
Prasad held the position of CEO at the NSW Government Decarbonisation Innovation Hub, The role involved working with stakeholders to decarbonise the economy with the aim of job creation and economic growth.

Prasad was previously the Lead Investigator and Partnerships Manager at the Sustainable Communities and Waste Hub, an initiative of the National Environmental Science Program for the Australian Federal Government.

Prasad was the CEO and Chief Investigator of the National Research and Innovation Hub for the Built Environment, a project known as the CRC for Low Carbon Living.

Prasad served as the interim executive director for the Australian Trailblazer bid for Recycling and Clean Energy. In 2020, Prasad was the Associate Dean of Industry Partnerships and Innovation at the Faculty of the Built Environment, UNSW, Sydney. Prasad was the founder and Program Director of the Master of Built Environment (sustainable development) at UNSW, Sydney, established in 1998.

== Honours and awards ==
- Fellow of the Royal Australian Institute of Architects (1991)
- NSW Government Individual Green Globe Award (2004)
- Winner of the institute's Neville Quarry Architectural Education Prize (2006)
- NSW Government Business Events Global Ambassador for Sydney since 2009
- Governor General of Australia's ‘Order of Australia’ AO (2014)
- Fellow of the Australian Academy of Technological Sciences and Engineering (2014)
- UNSW Outstanding Alumni Award (2014)
- Mahatma Gandhi Pravasi Samman Award (2017) – the first Fijian to receive this Indian government award
- NSW Government Global Impact Award (2019)
- Royal Australian Institute of Architects National Leadership in Sustainability Prize (2019)
