= Robert Butow =

Professor of Japanese history at Washington university,

Robert Joseph Charles Butow (March 19, 1924 – October 17, 2017) was a professor emeritus of Japanese history at the University of Washington in Seattle. An author of several books, he was a leading authority on Japan during World War II.

Robert Butow was born in San Mateo, California. As a boy, he moved with his family to Menlo Park, California. He subsequently attended college at Stanford University, where he was a member of the Army Reserve, and a student of the Japanese language. When his Army Reserve unit was activated, he was selected to attend the Army Japanese Language School.

Butow served in the United States Army during the early months of the occupation of Japan in 1945 and 1946, and became interested in Japanese history and culture. Upon his discharge as a second lieutenant, he returned to Stanford.

== Publications ==
His doctoral thesis on the Japanese surrender (titled Japan's Decision to Surrender) was published in 1954 as his first book.

His next book, Tojo and the Coming of the War, was in part a biography of Hideki Tōjō, the prime minister of Japan during most of World War II, in part an account of the political events in Japan that led to Japan's attack on the U.S., Britain, and Netherlands, and in part an account of the consequences of the War for Japan.

His third book (The John Doe Associates: Backdoor Diplomacy for Peace, 1941), published in 1974, was about a small group of Americans who, without diplomatic authority, tried to promote peace with Japan before 1941, but only ended up worsening relations between the two nations.
