= Rosemary Owens =

Australian legal scholar

Rosemary Joan Owens AO was the Dean of Law at the University of Adelaide Law School. She first started working at the University of Adelaide in 1987 as a tutor in the law school, becoming a Senior Lecturer in 1995, Associate Professor in 2005, and in 2008 she was appointed as a Professor of Law. She had previously performed the role of Associate Dean and replaced Paul Fairall upon his departure in 2008, remaining in the role until 2011.

Rosemary Owens holds a Bachelor of Laws (Hons) with Honors (having been awarded both The Angus Parsons Prize and The Law Society of South Australia Centenary Prize), a Diploma of Education, and a Bachelor of Arts (Hons), majoring in history. All were awarded by the University of Adelaide. Her research interests include work-related law and feminist legal theory.

In 2014 she was named an Officer of the Order of Australia in recognition of her "distinguished service to the law, particularly to legal education as an academic and administrator, to national and international employment and labour organisations, and to women".

== Selected bibliography ==
- Owens, Rosemary; Riley, Joellen (2007). The Law of Work. Melbourne: Oxford University Press. ISBN 978-0-19-551222-9.
- Fudge, Judy; Owens, Rosemary, eds. (2006). Precarious Work, Women and the New Economy: The Challenge to Legal Norms Hart Publishing. Oxford University Press. ISBN 1-84113-615-8.
- Naffine, Ngaire; Owens, Rosemary; Williams, John, eds. (2001). Intention in Law and Philosophy. Burlington, USA: Aldershot. ISBN 0-7546-2171-5.
- Naffine, Ngaire; Owens, Rosemary (1997). Sexing The Subject Of Law. LBC Information Services. ISBN 0-455-21469-7.

== Related Pages ==
- University of Adelaide
