= Sue Meek =

Australian scientist

- Education: James Cook University
- Awards: AO (2014)
- Scientific career
- Fields: Science
- Workplaces: Australian National University

Susan Denise Meek AO is an Australian scientist. From 2008 to 2016, she was the Chief Executive of the Australian Academy of Science.

== Career ==
Prior to her role at the Academy, Meek was Australia's inaugural Gene Technology Regulator from December 2001. This statutory appointment was established by the Australian Federal Government to administer the national regulatory system for the development and use of genetically modified organisms.

Before this, Meek held senior State Government positions in South Australia and Western Australia where she was responsible for the development and implementation of policies on science and technology and public sector intellectual property management; the administration of grant programs to support innovation and develop research capabilities; and the formulation of strategies to support emerging R&D intensive, emerging industries such as aquaculture, biotechnology and renewable energy. In the industry sphere, Meek has principally been involved with environmental consultancies and the establishment of biologically-based business ventures.

== Current board service ==
Meek currently serves on the following boards and committees:

- Agriculture and Food Systems Institute (Trustee).
- Bioplatforms Australia Ltd (Director).
- Centre for Personalised Immunology Advisory Board.

== Awards ==
Meek has received the following awards:

- Honorary Professor, The Australian National University (2016)
- Appointed Officer of the Order of Australia (2014)
- James Cook University Outstanding Alumni (2010)
- Elected to Australian Academy of Technological Sciences and Engineering (2005).
