= Phyllis Butow =

Australian academic

Phyllis Butow AM is a professor in the field of health psychology at the University of Sydney who received an Order of Australia in 2014 She is known for her research in psycho-oncology and understanding the psychological impacts of cancer and diseases.

== Early life and education ==
Butow completed her undergraduate studies with a Bachelor of Arts at Macquarie University, Master of Clinical Psychology at Australia National University, followed by a PhD in psychology at Sydney University.

== Career ==
=== Academic positions ===
- Professor at the University of Sydney
- Chair at Psychology at the University of Sydney
- Co-Director of the Centre for Medical Psychology & Evidence-based Decision-making (CeMPED) at the University of Sydney
- Founding member of the Psycho-Oncology Co-operative Research Group (PoCoG)

=== Research focus ===
Professor Butow's research primarily focuses on the psychological well-being of cancer patients, doctor-patient communication, and decision-making in cancer treatment.

== Contributions ==
- Psycho-Oncology Research: Butow has worked in the field of psycho-oncology, specifically, in investigating on the impacts of cancer on patients' mental health. She also founded organisations such as the Australian Psycho-Oncology Co-operative Research Group, with the aims of investigating psychologicals effect of disease and cancer.

== Publications ==
Butow has an H-index of 133, over 65,000 citations as at July 2024, according to Google Scholar, and has written more than 300 peer-reviewed articles and several books on health psychology and psycho-oncology, including publications in the journal Nature. Select publications include the following:

=== Journal articles ===
- Easton, D., Pooley, K., Dunning, A. et al. Genome-wide association study identifies novel breast cancer susceptibility loci. Nature 447, 1087–1093 (2007). https://doi.org/10.1038/nature05887.
- P.N. Butow, M. Maclean, S.M. Dunn, M.H.N. Tattersall, M.J. Boyer,(1997) The dynamics of change: Cancer patients' preferences for information, involvement and support, Annals of Oncology, Volume 8, Issue 9, P857-863, https://doi.org/10.1023/A:1008284006045.

=== Books ===
- Campbell, A., Cumming, S., Morrison, V., Bennett, P., Mullan, B., White, K., Gerrig, R., Zimbardo, P., Wilkes, F., Butow, P. (2009). PHE1IDH Individual Determinants of Health. Frenchs Forest Sydney: Pearson Education.
- Morrison, V., Bennett, P., Butow, P., et al. (2007). Introduction to health psychology in Australia. Frenchs Forest, N.S.W.: Pearson Education.

== Selected grants ==
=== 2023 ===
- P-OMICs-flow: Integrating precision oncology into clinical programs, Taylor N, Thomas D, Tucker K, Ballinger M, Zaheed M, Lin F, Goldstein D, Leaney K, Morrow A, Parkinson B, Butow P, et al.

=== 2021 ===
- Finding My Way-Advanced: Can a web-based psychosocial intervention improve mental quality of life for women with cancer?, Butow P, et al.

=== 2020 ===
- Carers and Multimorbidity, Juraskova I, Laidsaar-Powell R, Butow P, et al. School of Psychology/Booster Grant
- Remove the Mask: Reducing Anxiety for Cancer Radiotherapy Patients, Keall P, Butow P, et al.
