= 1995 Australia Day Honours =

The 1995 Australia Day Honours are appointments to various orders and honours to recognise and reward good works by Australian citizens. The list was announced on 26 January 1995 by the Governor General of Australia, Bill Hayden.

The Australia Day Honours are the first of the two major annual honours lists, the first announced to coincide with Australia Day (26 January), with the other being the Queen's Birthday Honours, which are announced on the second Monday in June.

† indicates an award given posthumously.

== Order of Australia ==
=== Companion (AC) ===
==== General Division ====
Recipient	Citation	Notes
Dr Elinor Catherine Hamlin AM	For service to gynaecology in developing countries, particularly in the field of fistula surgery and for humanitarian service to improving the health, dignity and self-esteem of women in Ethiopia	
Dr Phillip Garth Law AO CBE	For service to science, particularly in the field of Antarctic exploration and research, and to education	
Professor Edwin Carlyle Wood CBE	For service to the discipline of obstetrics and gynaecology, particularly through the development of in vitro fertilisation (IVF) and its application to human infertility	

==== Military Division ====
Recipient	Citation	Notes
Lieutenant General John Stuart Baker, AO	For service to the Government as Vice Chief of the Australian Defence Force	

=== Officer (AO) ===
==== General Division ====
Recipient	Citation	Notes
Associate Professor David Louis Bennett	For service to medicine, particularly in the field of adolescent health and medical care	
Professor Peter John Boyce	For service to education, international relations and the community	
Sir Frank Adams Callaway, CMG OBE	For service to music education, particularly through the development of the Callaway International Resource Centre for Music Education	
Professor Jeffrey Carmichael	For service to the community, finance and education	
Professor Timothy Boyd	For service to paediatric cardiology and cardiac surgery	
Robert Frederick Clifford	For service to the shipbuilding industry, particularly through the development and design of high-speed catamarans	
Anthony Stuart Cole	For service to the development of public sector policy, particularly in the areas of industry and public finance	
Graham Charles Evans	For service to microeconomic reform in the transport and communications fields	
Valerie Claire Fisher, OBE	For service to raising the status of women in developing countries through the Associated Country Women of the World	
Stuart Anthony Hamilton	For service to public administration and public sector reform	
Professor Kenneth John Hardy	For service to medicine in the field of surgery, particularly liver transplant and laparoscopic surgery	
Dr John Charles Hargrave, MBE	For service to the treatment of leprosy and in the fields of reconstructive surgery and microsurgery	
William John Harris	For service to public administration, particularly in the Australian Capital Territory and to the community	
Philip Christian Hercus	For service to the shipbuilding industry, particularly through the development and design of high-speed catamarans	
Robert Duncan Hogg	For service to politics and government as National Secretary of the Australian Labor Party	
Dr Donald Jack Hopgood	For service to the South Australian Parliament, to conservation and the environment and to the community	
James Joseph Kennedy, CBE	For service to business, to tourism, and to the community	
Ian Bruce Carrick Kiernan, OAM	For service to conservation and the environment through the Clean-Up Australia and Clean-Up the World campaigns	
Christopher John Koch	For service to Australian literature as a novelist	
Irene Kwong Moss	For service to the advancement of a multicultural society as Federal Race Discrimination Commissioner	
Emeritus Professor Sir Rupert (Horace) Myers, KBE	For service to the promotion of innovation and commerce in the fields of science, technology and engineering	
The Honourable Joseph Martin Riordan	For service to industrial relations, to social justice, and to the community	
Imelda Joan Roche	For service to business and commerce, to women's affairs, and to the community	
Professor Peter Winston Sheehan	For service to education, research and psychology	
His Honour Judge James Henry Staunton, CBE QC	For service to judicial administration and to the legal, ethical and administrative responsibilities of the judiciary	
Dr Ian Matheson Steven	For service to paediatric anaesthesia and to the establishment of intensive care services at Adelaide Children's Hospital	
Kerry Matthew Stokes	For service to business and commerce, to the arts, and to the community	
Kenneth William Taylor	For service to the development of overseas aid and to the community	
Associate Professor Michael James Tyler	For service to zoology, particularly through the research and conservation of Australian amphibians	
Professor Brian Graham Wilson	For service to Australian higher education	
Lionel Barrie Woodward	For service to public sector administration and reform	

==== Military Division ====
Branch	Recipient	Citation	Notes
Army	Major General Geoffrey David Carter, AM	For service to the Australian Army, particularly as Deputy Chief of the General Staff	
Air Force	Air Commodore Robert Victor Richardson	For outstanding service to the Royal Australian Air Force as the Air Officer Commanding Training Command	

=== Member (AM) ===
==== General Division ====
Recipient	Citation	Notes
Philip David A'Vard	For service to the performing arts, particularly in the field of children's theatre	
Robert Crichton Allison	For service to the funeral industry and to the community	
John Nils Almgren	For service to the telecommunications and electronics industries	
Basil Grose Atkinson	For service to the tourism and hospitality industries	
Concetta Benn	For service to social welfare, particularly in the areas of health and education	
Dr Brian Douglas Booth	For service to Australian agriculture, particularly to the grain and livestock industries	
Alison Glenda Bowen Pain	For service to amateur swimming, particularly as an administrator	
Michael Keith Fosbery Bray	For service to the community and conservation	
Ngairetta Joy Brennan	For service to the environment, particularly through the planting and maintenance of trees and to the community	
Roger David Brockhoff	For service to the community and local government	
Lindsay Arthur Buckley	For service to industrial relations, particularly through the Australian-Japan Society Queensland and to the community	
Anthony James Clark	For service to business and commerce and to the community	
Alexander Stewart Cockburn	For service to journalism and literature	
Dr Harry Cohen	For service to medicine, particularly in the field of obstetrics and gynaecology and to international relations	
Dr Robert Benjamin Cooter	For service to medicine, particularly in rural areas to the Royal Flying Doctor Service and for community service through Lions International	
Michael Charles Courtney	For service to the community and journalism	
Professor Alan David Crown	For service to education, particularly in the field of Semitic studies	
John Ronald Curro, MBE	For service to music, particularly to the development of youth orchestras	
Isolde Ira Davis	For service to the Lithuanian community and to education	
Raymond Joseph Delmenico	For service to the grain industry	
Dr Richard Arthur Ian Drew	For service to entomology, particularly in the field of fruit fly control	
Kenneth William Michael Eastwood	For service to accountancy and to the community	
Vera Entwistle	For service to children as the founder of Camp Quality International	
Daphne Grace Fancutt	For service to the sport of tennis as a player, coach and administrator	
Robert William Fitzgerald	For service to community welfare, particularly through the Society of St Vincent De Paul	
John Anthony Gilbert	For service to the performing arts	
Alan George Frank Gill	For service to the media particularly in the field of religious journalism	
Mollie Gillen	For service to genealogy and to Australian historical research	
Anna Glover	For service to art administration	
Dr John Gouldhawke Golledge	For service to medicine and to community health administration	
Dr Peter Warner Graham	For service to medicine, particularly in rural areas	
Dr Christopher John Gwyn Griffiths, RFD	For service to forensic dentistry	
Yoram Jerzy Gross	For service to the Australian film industry, particularly in the field of animation techniques	
Dr John Chadwick Hanrahan	For service to medicine, particularly in the field of plastic and reconstructive surgery and hand surgery and to administration	
Professor Simon Hai Haskell	For service to special education	
Leonie (Noni) Elva Hazelhurst	For service to the performing arts as an actor, director and presenter of children's television programs	
John Roger Holdich	For public service	
Patrick Hennessy Hunt	For service to basketball, particularly as a coach	
Brother Fabian Hynes	For service to international relations to pharmacy and to the hospitaller Order of St John of God	
Graeme Gordon Innes	For service to the community particularly as an adviser on disability anti-discrimination policy	
Ross Douglas Irvine	For service to community health and to international relations	
Harold Hugh Jeffrey	For service to people with visual impairments	
Paul Arthur Jennings	For service to children's literature	
Sally Margaret Johnson	For service to remote area nursing and to Aboriginal health	
Dr Helen Patricia Jones	For service to education particularly through documenting the history of women in South Australia	
Emeritus Professor Edwin Arthur Judge	For service to education particularly in the field of ancient history	
Olga Kanitasaki	For service to nursing particularly through the development of a multicultural health service	
Dr John Douglas Kelly	For service to conservation and the environment particularly in the field of wildlife preservation and to zoo administration	
Professor David Thomas Kelly	For service to medicine particularly in the field of cardiology	
Dr Richard John Kemp	For service to medicine particularly in the management of infectious diseases including HIV infection	
Dr David McMillan King	For service to medicine and to the South Australian Branch of the Australian Medical Association	
Margaret Bell Macfarlane	For service to nursing	
Alec Frank MacKelden, MC	For service to the community, particularly as chairman of the Skin and Cancer Foundation of Australia	
Dr Frank Ian Russell Martin	For service to medicine, particularly in the field of endocrinology and diabetes	
Richard Chapman Mason, OBE	For service to industry and to the community	
Peter Edward Mason	For service to the community as Chairman of the Children's Hospital Fund of the Royal Alexandra Hospital for Children	
Major Peter Mazengarb, (Retd)	For service to veterans	
Dr Colleen Juanita McDonough	For service to education, particularly in the field of higher education, and to the community	
Walter Richard McVitty	For service to the arts, particularly as educator and publisher of children's literature	
Zosia (Sophie) Mercer	For service to the Jewish community	
Ronald Glen Mertin	For service to Australian-Asian relations as a consultant and adviser on dairy plant management	
Frank William Mossfield	For service to industrial relations through the trade union movement and to the community	
Associate Professor Elaine Margaret Murphy	For service to health, physical education and recreation	
Professor John Edward Murtagh	For service to medicine, particularly in the areas of medical education, research and publishing	
Trent Hugh Robert Nathan	For service to the fashion industry	
Leslie John Nayda	For service to the community, particularly in the area of Aboriginal welfare	
Archibald John Nelson	For service to education, particularly in the field of adult literacy	
The Reverend Peter John O'Connor	For service to the community, particularly as Superintendent of the Brisbane City Mission	
Dr Hamilton Stuart Patterson	For service to medicine, particularly in the fields of general practice paediatrics and preventive medicine and to the community	
Gordon Charles Pearce	For public service	
Charles Ian Perdriau	For service to the community, particularly through Kiwanis International	
Lloyd Stanley Perron	For service to business and commerce and to the community	
David Lee Price, OAM	For service to the community	
Robert Albert Raynor	For service to the community through the Art Foundation of Victoria	
Eric Walter Rea	For service to people with hearing impairments	
Karin Victoria Redman	For service to education, particularly in the field of distance education	
Robert William Bruce Reid	For service to the community and to international relations	
Kenneth James Roberts	For service to the pharmaceutical industry and for the promotion of medical research	
Pamela Roberts	For service to the community, particularly in the areas of adoption and child welfare	
William Roche	For service to business and commerce	
Dr Ian Shearer Russell	For service to medicine, particularly in the area of the management and control of breast cancer	
Thomas Victor Shaw	For service to veterans and to the community	
Dr Damien Patrick Smith	For service to optometry, particularly through the promotion of eye care in the Asia Pacific region	
Dr David Floyd Smith	For service to primary industry	
Dr Toby Dix St George, RFD	For service to veterinary science, particularly in the field of veterinary virology	
Patricia Jane Staunton	For service to nursing	
Dr George Randall Stirling	For service to medicine, particularly in the field of cardiothoracic surgery	
Jillian de Pledge Sykes	For service to the arts	
Emeritus Professor Michael Gleeson Taylor	For service to medicine, particularly in the field of physiology and to health administration	
Graham Elgin Thomson	For service to education	
Sister Mary Felix Thorburn	For service to nursing, particularly in the field of intensive care and operating theatre nursing	
John James Trevillian	For service to the community as Executive Director of the New South Wales Australia Day Council	
Elizabeth Bell Williams	For service to the trade union movement and to the rights of women in the workforce	
Associate Professor Lesley Merle Williams	For service in the fields of education, science and the study of medical history	

==== Military Division ====
Branch	Recipient	Citation	Notes
Navy	Captain Geoffrey Raymond Cole	For service to the Royal Australian Navy and Naval Support Command, particularly as Commanding Officer of HMAS Nirimba	
Navy	Warrant Officer Barry William Kane	For outstanding devotion to duty with the Royal Australian Navy, particularly as the Fleet Warrant Officer Signals Yeoman	
Navy	Captain Ivan Anthony Shearer	For distinguished performance of duty to the Royal Australian Navy and the Australian Defence Force, particularly in the fields of international law and training of naval lawyers	
Army	Lieutenant Colonel Peter Robert Ball	For service to the Australian Army as the Commanding Officer of the 9th Battalion The Royal Queensland Regiment	
Army	Brigadier Peter James Bray	For service to the Australian Army, particularly as the Commander 4th Military District and Director General of the Personnel Support	
Army	Colonel Peter Malcolm Dinham	For service to the Australian Army and Australian Defence Force in the fields of personnel support and health administration	
Army	Colonel David William Kibbey	For outstanding service to the Australian Army, particularly as Colonel Headquarters Training Command and Commandant 1st Recruit Training Battalion, Kapooka	
Army	Lieutenant Colonel Michael Bernard O'Brien	For distinguished service to the Australian Army, particularly with the 1st Armoured Regiment	
Army	Principal Chaplain Ernest Theodore Sabel		
Army	Lieutenant Colonel John Yew Hong Teh	For exceptional service to the Australian Army, particularly in the field of Army Health Services	
Army	Brigadier Gregory Ramon Thomas	For outstanding service to the Australian Army, particularly in establishing the Defence National Storage and Distribution Centre	
Air Force	Group Captain Gary William Kirk	For outstanding service to the Royal Australian Air Force, particularly as the Director of Personnel Airmen and Officer Commanding No 304 Air Base Wing Edinburgh	
Air Force	Wing Commander John Archibald Longrigg	For outstanding service to the Royal Australian Air Force, particularly in the formation and development of the Tactical Fighter Logistics Management Squadron at RAAF Williamtown	
Air Force	Air Commodore Peter Gervase Nicholson	For exceptional service as Commander Northern Command	
Air Force	Group Captain Clarence James Stjernqvist	For outstanding service to the Royal Australian Air Force, particularly as Director of Personnel Airmen	

=== Medal (OAM) ===
==== General Division ====
Recipient	Citation	Notes
Rowena Christine Allsop	For service to the community	
Maxwell Geoffrey Anderson	For service to local government, the pastoral industry and the community	
Ronald Stuart Anderson	For service to people with disabilities, particularly through sport	
Cecil Ernest Anstey	For service to the sport of cricket	
Margaret Hazeldine Ashney	For service to children with disabilities	
James Arthur Badger	For service to children's television and films	
Minnie Jane Bailey	For service to the community	
Hilton William Baker, QFSM	For service to the sport of greyhound racing	
Archbishop Aghan Baliozian	For service to the Armenian community, particularly as Primate of the Armenian Diocese of Australia	
Councillor Frederick William Scott Ballhausen	For service to the community and local government	
John Kerr Barnes	For service to veterans	
Ronald Edwin Barr	For service to youth, particularly as founder of Youth Insearch	
Irwin Prescott Barrett-Lennard	For service to the community	
Rosilyn Ivy Baxter	For service to local government and to conservation	
Arthur John Beakley	For service to the community	
Raymond Claude Bell	For service to youth, particularly through the Australian Air League	
Pamela North Bell	For service to the arts and to the support of artists	
Jill Bennett	For service to people with intellectual disabilities	
Laura Mary Bennett	For service to the community	
Councillor Peter Laurence Black	For service to the community and local government	
Leslie Norman Blackley	For service to education	
Patricia Margaret Blashki	For service to the community	
Harold McLennan Blundell	For service to veterans	
Louis William Bond	For service to the community and local government	
Dorothy Alice Bond	For service to community health, particularly through the Bayside Rheumatism and Arthritis Support Group	
Albert Edward Bowden	For service to community music, particularly through the Victorian Band's League	
Mabel Emily Marion Bowen	For service to the community, particularly to the aged	
Harold Power Boyd	For service to veterans	
Father Martin Charles Branagan	For service to the Redemptorist and to the Roman Catholic Church of North Queensland	
Karen Mary Brown	For service to the sport of hockey and the Aboriginal community	
James Hill Brown	For service to the community and to the NSW Parliament	
Noel Edward Bullard	For service to the community, particularly through the Charity Fundraising Committee Revesby Workers Club	
Ian Rutherford Bulmer	For service to the community, particularly as Chairman of the Tambo Water Board	
Elizabeth Cameron Dalman	For service to contemporary dance	
Joseph Michael Camilleri	For service to the community and local government	
Ronald Barry Camplin	For service to the community and radio broadcasting	
Edward Francis Carolan	For service to local government and industrial relations	
Kenneth John Cartner	For service to the community, particularly through the Brunswick Valley and District Volunteer Rescue Association	
Frederick James Church, OBE MBE	For service to the community, particularly through the Baptist Community Services	
Kingsley Juan Clark	For service to the community and veterans	
John Lloyd Clemenger	For service to the Windana Society	
Mary Imelda Cocks	For service to the community	
Wilfred Kenneth Collicoat	For service to the sport of cricket	
Joy Lorraine Connolly	For service to community health, particularly through SOLACE	
William Harold Copeland	For service to local government	
Margaret Wren Corden	For service to community health, particularly in the field of nutrition	
Sister Teresita Cormack	For service to education and to the Mary McKillop Promotion Committee	
Father Alan Alexander Corry	For service to the community, particularly the Aboriginal community	
Douglas George Elliott Cowles	For service to the community and the newspaper industry	
Frances Tonia Crampton	For service to the sport of gymnastics	
Neville Douglas Crew	For service to adult education and community development programmes	
Douglas Henry Crosby	For service to the dairy industry and to the sport of golf	
Jean Margaret Crumpler	For service as a foster parent	
Raymond Neville Dart	For service to the community	
Beverley Davis	For service to Australian Jewish history and to the community	
George Dechnicz, MBE	For service to the Ukrainian community	
William Ross Deller	For service to Australian Rules football, particularly as the National Director of Umpiring	
Lilian Dixon	For service to assisting families and to establishing Youth Insearch WA	
Phyllis Margaret Dray	For service to nursing, particularly as Matron of Proserpine Hospital	
Fay Irene Drayton	For service to the sport of netball	
Elizabeth Dreger	For service to the aged, to nursing and to the community	
Judith Mavis Durham	For service to music, particularly as an entertainer and composer	
Margaret McLean Evans	For service to the community and to local government	
Winifred Evans	For service to the community and to the aged	
Raymond Boultwood Ewers	For service to the arts, particularly as a sculptor	
Robert Gordon Fairlie, DFC	For service to the community, particularly through charitable and financial administration	
Dennis Fall	For service to the community and to local government	
William Brian Fegan, MBE	For service to veterans and to Defence Widows Support Group	
Reverend Arthur Lockhart Finlay	For service to the Uniting Church in Australia, particularly St Ives Uniting Church and to the community	
Edward John Fisher	For service to local government and to the community	
Jill Louise Fogarty	For service to the Podiatry Education and Training Section at the Sydney Institute of Technology	
Victoria Maria Fontana	For service to the Italian community	
Morris Zion Forbes	For service to the Australian Jewish Historical Society	
John Grosvenor Francis	For service to the sugar industry and to the community	
Dr George McLennan Fraser	For service to hospice and palliative care, particularly through the Mary Potter Hospice	
Clara Maud Freudenstein	For service to the community	
Audrey Prescott Fuhrer	For service to the Girl Guides’ Association of South Australia	
Pamela Wilhelmina Gedling	For service to the Country Women's Association	
Anna Ida Georgoussis	For service to the Greek community, particularly the care of aged people	
Wensley Frances Goebel	For service to the Girl Guides’ Association and to the community	
Frederick Richard Goldfinch	For service to Toukley and district senior citizens	
Florence Mavis Goldfinch	For service to Toukley and district senior citizens	
William Alexander Golding	For service to the environment and to the development of the Great South West Walk	
Reverend Dr Djiniyini Gondarra	For service to the Uniting Church and the Uniting Aboriginal and Islander Christian Congress	
William James Goodman	For service to surf lifesaving and to the sport of basketball	
Desmond Lyle Graham	For service to education, particularly in The Armidale School and to the arts	
Shirley Dorothea Graham	For service to the community, particularly through the Queensland Motor Neurone Society and the Girl Guides' Association	
Leslie Francis Graham	For service to the community	
Dr Brian Ashley Greed	For service to the community and to local government, particularly the Benalla Water Board	
Sister Marietta Green	For service to education, particularly through the provision of specialised educational programmes for Aboriginal children	
Patricia Ann Greenham	For service to the community through 'Fodder Drive 1992'	
Geoffrey John Guest	For service to the community, particularly disadvantaged youth	
Margaret Dawn Guthrie	For service to the community, particularly aged people and to community arts	
James John Guy	For service to cricket, particularly as an umpire and administrator	
Etheleen Veronica Guy	For service to the community	
Trevor Frank Hagan	For service to veterans, particularly the Vietnam Veterans’ Association of Central Queensland	
Associate Professor John Kenneth Harcourt	For service to dentistry and dental education	
Robert Alexander Hay	For service to people with disabilities, particularly the visually impaired	
Shirley Irene Heaysman	For service to nursing, particularly as the Deputy Director of Nursing at Flinders Medical Centre	
Leslie Edward Hewitt	For service to the community	
Ian Douglas Heywood	For service to music education and to community music	
John Jacob Hines	For service to the Jewish community and for developing and promoting exports from South Australia	
Caroline Holmes	For service to education particularly for children who are deaf or hearing impaired	
Leonard Christopher Holt	For service to the community through fodder drive	
Noel Anthony Howard	For service to the care of aged people particularly as the executive director of the Illawarra Retirement Trust	
Patrick John Hughes	For service to the dairy farming industry to local government and to the community	
Fred Huntress	For service to the community of the Logan city district.	
Francis Laurence Ives	For service to sailing, particularly junior sailing in the Sabot class and 18 footers	
Elaine Margaret Johnston	For service to women's and junior hockey on the central coast	
Marie Kathryn Kays	For service to veterans and war widows, particularly as national president of the War Widows Guild of Australia	
Father William Patrick Kennedy	For service to the community	
Ida Maud Kennedy	For service to education as Principal of Clayfield College Brisbane	
Maxmillian John Klingner	For service to surf lifesaving	
Leonard Koschel	For service to the community and to cricket	
John Alfred Kosovich	For service to the wine industry	
Antanas Viktoras Kramilius	For service to the Lithuanian community	
Chief Commissioner Stacey Lester Kruck, OBE	For service to the community through the Everyman's Welfare Service	
Frederick Noel Lakin	For service to education and to the community	
Allan Bruce Leake	For service to jazz music	
Sergeant Stanley George Lean	For service to the community	
Gordon Falconer Lee, MBE	For service to veterans and to the community	
Reverend Dr Sang Taek Lee	For service to the Korean community	
Russell George Leitch	For service to the Employers’ Federation of New South Wales	
Spencer Hardinge Logue	For service to the hospitality and tourism industries	
Joseph Lewis Lonsdale	For service to veterans and to the community	
Lieutenant Colonel Austen George Francis Eliott Loveday, RFD	For service to education, particularly children with learning difficulties	
Bonita Grace Lovitt	For service to the Kingston Centre and to the community	
Gary Joseph James Lynagh	For service to rowing	
Councillor John Bruce Macdonald	For service to local government	
Aelsie Rose Magnus	For service to the National Council of Jewish Women	
Wendy Sheila Mander	For service to children with learning disabilities	
Ronald George Mapp	For service to surf lifesaving	
Ross Thomas Martin	For service to the community	
Mavis Joy Martin	For service to veterans through the Royal Australian Air Force Association (SA)	
Alwyn Charles (Gus) Mauch	For service to gliding and to the community	
Joseph John McCorley	For service to education	
Paul Newman McCullough	For service to marching	
Gerard Majella McGuire	For service to the Dental Technicians’ Association and the Dental Prosthetists’ Association	
Neil Alexander McLean	For service to the community	
Eleanor Hope McSwan	For service to local history and to the community	
David Lynton Menadue	For service to community health, particularly assisting people with HIV/AIDS	
Margaret (Peg) Minty	For service to the visual arts as a landscape painter	
Lorna May Mitchell, BEM	For service to the community	
Alberto Modolo	For service to the tourism and hospitality industries	
John Patrick Monahan	For service to Australian Rules football through the Victorian Country Football League	
John Francis Morahan, MBE	For service to the community, particularly through the Society of St Vincent de Paul	
Patricia Mary Morrisey	For service to the Catholic Women's League and to fundraising for the disadvantaged	
William James Morrow, DFC	For service to the Geelong Historical Society and to historical research	
Mary Heaford Murray	For service to the community as a fundraiser and for the establishment of Mary Murray Welfare Committee	
Commander George Michael Nekrasov, (Ret'd)	For service to the Russian community	
Alexander Nelson	For service to the community as a volunteer fundraiser for local charities and community welfare projects	
Michael Joseph Norton	For service to sport as a gold medallist at the Paralympic Games Lillehammer 1994	
James Francis O'Brien	For service to the trade union movement	
James William O'Callaghan	For service to aged people and to the community	
Audrey Campbell Oertel	For service to music as an accompanist and singing coach	
Geraldine Joyce Pack	For service to the Australian Juvenile Diabetes Foundation	
Colonel Ernest Noel Park, DSO ED (Ret'd)	For service to the New South Wales Parliament and to the community	
Edward Henry George Pask	For service to dance history as an archivist, lecturer and broadcaster	
Eunice Olive Peterson	For service to swimming, particularly through the Tasmanian Amateur Swimming Association	
Irene Pettiford	For service to youth and to the community	
Maurice Arthur Phillips	For service to the community	
Dr Jean Margaret Piaggio	For service to medicine and to the community	
Kerry George Pink	For service to journalism	
Stanley Bruce Pitt	For service to hockey	
Frances Anthonette Pollon	For service to researching and recording local history	
William Frederick Powell	For service to the welfare of veterans	
Helena Pugh	For service to the community	
Francis Xavier Purcell	For service to the law, particularly Aboriginal Land Rights, and to the community	
Jane Raffin	For service to the arts, particularly through the promotion of regional art galleries	
Sheikh Shakib Abraham Rasheed	For service to the community	
Lydia Mikhailovna Rasoumovsky	For service to the community	
Warren Allen Rennie	For service to surf lifesaving	
Evelyn Mary Rimington	For service to conservation and the environment	
Jack Roberts	For service to local government and to the community	
Violet Frances Robinson	For service to the community, particularly children and Aboriginal people	
Kevin James Roche	For service to lawn bowls	
Brian Donald Roebig	For service to the insurance industry	
Peter Charles Rorke	For service to music	
Dr John Layton Rourse	For service to horticulture, particularly the cultivation and propagation of Vireya Rhododendrons	
Dr Brian Gordon Sando	For service to sports medicine	
The Reverend Father Seraphim Sanz de Gandeano, MBE	For service to the Aboriginal community at Lakumburu Mission	
Daphne Elizabeth Schlipalius	For service to charities through fundraising	
Leonard Marshal Schlipalius	For service to charities through fundraising	
Edmond Joseph Scott	For service to sport	
Elizabeth Jane Scrivener	For service to the ACT Cancer Society and to the community	
Charles Joseph Searson	For service to the Speech and Hearing Centre for Deaf Children WA (Inc) and to the community	
Hazel Joan Sims	For service to women's bowling and indoor bias bowls	
Jeanette McDonald Slade	For service to women's hockey	
Archibald Edmund Smith	For service to police/community relations	
Dr Ernest Walter Smith	For service to art administration and promotion, particularly as Director of the Swan Hill Regional Gallery of Contemporary Art	
Stuart David Southwick	For service to local government and to the community	
John Charles Staines	For service to the community	
Arnold Lloyd Stephens	For service to the Bicheno Players and to the community	
Esna May Stewart	For service to swimming and to women's bowling	
Lillian Mabel Stubbs	For service to the community	
Ronald Keith Suich	For service to Templestowe High School and to the Victorian Council of School Organisations	
Walter Summerton	For service to the Totally and Permanently Disabled Soldiers’ Association and to the Australian Funeral Directors’ Association	
Phillip Symons	For service to the community	
Norma Jean Thomas	For service to the community, particularly through the Australian Red Cross	
Colin John Thomas	For service to community music, particularly band music	
Harry Thompson	For service to badminton	
Norman Collingwood Tilley	For service to pistol shooting and to the Australian Booksellers’ Association (Tas)	
Daphne Miriam Mary Todd	For service to sport and to the community	
Van Canh Tran	For service to Vietnamese community	
David Stanley Turfrey	For service to the care of aged people	
Rachel Valler	For service to music, particularly as a pianist	
Salvino Emmanuel Vella	For service to soccer and to the Maltese community	
Ivy Katherine Frances Vowles	For service to the care of aged people	
Paul Wade	For service to youth and the community through the Anti-Smoking and Drug Offensive campaigns and to soccer	
Doreen Marian Walding	For service to women's lawn bowls	
Harry Lachlan Wallace	For service to the community and to the development of the AUSBUY campaign	
Allan Warburton	For service to local government and to the community	
Dr Matheus John Washyn	For service to the Ukrainian community	
Robert George Webster	For service to veterans and to the community	
Cyril Charles Arthur Wendt	For service to band music as a drum major drill, adjudicator and administrator	
Kenneth William Wilder	For service to the publishing industry	
Lester Joseph Williams	For service to local government and to the community	
Charles Stanley Williams	For service to the community through the State Emergency Service and Australian Red Cross and to veterans	
Kenneth Stanley Williamson	For service to veterans, particularly through the Korea and South-East Asia Forces Association	
Jack Willis	For service to the promotion of recreational activities, particularly lawn bowls, for the disabled	
Eric Ronald Wilson	For service to the development and tourism in the Hinchinbrook and Cardwell areas	
Dr Robert Melville Withers	For service to horticulture, specialising in camellias, rhododendrons and liliums	
John Albert Wood	For service to the retail food industry and to the community	
Donald Adrian Woolnough	For service to lawn bowls	
Maurice Reginald Worthy	For service to the welfare and rehabilitation of prisoners	
Joseph Charles Wroth	For service to the community	
Raymond Frederick Yee	For service to the Chinese community	
Nancy Melva York	For service to community health, particularly through the Mental Health Auxiliaries of Victoria	

==== Military Division ====
Branch	Recipient	Citation	Notes
Navy	Commander Antony Keith Anderson	For service to the Royal Australian Navy and the Australian Defence Force in the development of future defence capabilities, particularly the training and helicopter support ship project	
Navy	Chief Petty Officer Rodney Thomas Coughran-Lane	For service to the Royal Australian Navy, particularly in the field of Ceremonial Music as Drum Major RAN Band, VIC	
Navy	Lieutenant William Kenneth McMillan	For outstanding devotion to duty with the Royal Australian Navy, particularly with regard to his unstinting efforts in ensuring the highest possible standards of underwater warfare	
Navy	Warrant Officer Ian Alan Rushton	For meritorious service, outstanding professionalism and exceptional devotion to duty with the Royal Australian Navy as the Sports Officer at HMAS Cerberus	
Army	Warrant Officer Class One David Arthur Allen	For service to the Australian Army as Regimental Sergeant Major of the Puckapunyal Logistic Battalion	
Army	Warrant Officer Class One William Frank Bowser	For service to the Australian Army in the field of military intelligence	
Army	Warrant Officer Class Two Craig Andrew Coleman, CSM	For service to the Australian Army, particularly while serving with the Cambodian Mine Action Centre	
Army	Warrant Officer Class One Lloyd Thomas Gough	For outstanding service to the Australian Army, particularly as the Regimental Sergeant Major of 3rd Combat Engineer Regiment	
Army	Warrant Officer Class One Kevin Andrew Hall	For outstanding service to the Australian Army, particularly in the field of logistics	
Army	Warrant Officer Class Two Alexander John McDade	For outstanding service to the Australian Army, particularly as the Battery Sergeant Major of 104th and 41st Field Batteries	
Army	Warrant Officer Class One Peter Stanley Sims	For distinguished service to the Australian Army, particularly with the Army Community Service in Sydney and Darwin	
Army	Warrant Officer Class One Barry Tolley	For outstanding service to the Australian Army, particularly in the field of training	
Army	Warrant Officer Class Two Charles Thomas Tournoff	For outstanding service to the Australian Army, particularly in the field of training at the School of Army Aviation	
Air Force	Chaplain Flight Lieutenant Rodney Graham Acreman	For meritorious service to the Royal Australian Air Force, particularly in the field of pastoral care	
Air Force	Flight Sergeant Lindsay Graham Curtis	For service to the Royal Australian Air Force, particularly in the field of telecommunications management at RAAF Wagga and Edinburgh	
Air Force	Flight Sergeant Shayne Thomas Flynn	For service to the Royal Australian Air Force, particularly in the field of Non-Destructive Inspection at No 501 Wing Amberley	
Air Force	Squadron Leader Robyne Louise Green	For meritorious service to the Royal Australian Air Force, particularly in the field of administrative management	
