= Les Williams =

Les Williams may refer to:

- Bert Williams (footballer, born 1905) (1905–1974), Welsh footballer
- Les Williams (Australian footballer) (1923–1998), Australian rules footballer
- Les Williams (surfer), surfing companion of Nick Gabaldon
- Les Williams (actor), in the 2007 film Kiss the Bride

== See also ==
- Leslie Williams (disambiguation)
- Lesley Williams (1932–2016), Australian geneticist
