= Ellen Jones =

Ellen Jones may refer to:

- Ellen E. Jones (film critic)
- Ellen Jones (novelist), American author of historical romance novels, published from 1991
- Ellen Isabel Jones (died 1946), née Cotton, English suffragette and close associate of the Pankhursts
- Ellen Jaffe Jones (born 1952), American consumer, health, and fitness journalist and author
- Ellen Jones (translator), British scholar and translator
- Ellen Jones (footballer) (born 2002), English footballer
- Elin Jones (born 1966), Welsh politician and Presiding Officer of the Senedd

== See also ==
- Mary Ellen Jones (disambiguation)
- Helen Jones (disambiguation)
