= G. V. Portus =

Australian historian & England international rugby union player

Garnet Vere "Jerry" Portus MA., B.Litt. (Oxon) (7 June 1883 – 16 June 1954) was an Australian academic.

== History ==
Portus was born in Morpeth, New South Wales, a son of Henry Dumaresq Portus, local manager for the Newcastle and Hunter River Steamship Company. Canon Harold S. D. Portus (c. 1874 – 20 April 1941), rector of St. Peter's Church, East Maitland was a brother.

Portus was a student at Maitland Public High School and after leaving joined the Mines Department, but three years later, at the urging of (Anglican) Bishop Stanton of Newcastle studied at St Paul's College, Sydney University, graduating with First-class Honours. He was a fine athlete and a star (Rugby Union) footballer, and in 1907 won a Rhodes Scholarship, which took him to Oxford University, where he achieved his MA in 1909 and B.Litt. two years later. He represented England in the 1908 Home Nations Championship.

He acted as Professor of History and Economy at Adelaide University 1913–1914 while Professor Henderson was on leave.

He was ordained a priest and served the Church of England as rector of Cessnock. He served as a censor during the Great War, while studying for his MA, which he achieved in 1917.

He was employed as lecturer in Economic History at Sydney University and director of tutorial classes.

He was appointed Professor of Political Science and History at Adelaide University in 1934, retiring in 1948, but continued to lecture until shortly before his death. He died at his North Adelaide home shortly after attending a function for a visiting team of Rugby Union footballers from Fiji.

== Other interests ==
- He was keenly interested in cricket
- He was a double rowing blue at Oxford
- He played Rugby Union for Oxford and in 1908 captained the English Rugby Union side
- He was an Australian Rugby selector in 1934
- He was a regular and popular broadcaster on a wide range of subjects
- He was a member of the ABC talks advisory committee
- He strongly supported the League of Nations Union
- He was a member of the think tank Common Cause that met during WWII to discuss post-war reconstruction
- He was a member, Federal Council of the Australian Association of the United Nations.

== Recognition ==
A house at Maitland High School was named after him.

He was cited as mentor and inspiration for Helen Patricia Jones (1926–2018).

== Family ==
He married Ethel M. Ireland, of Newcastle in 1912. A son, John Portus, was Conciliation Commissioner.

== Bibliography ==
- Portus, G. V. Caritas Anglicana Mowbray & Co., Oxford.
- Portus, G. V. (1921) Marx and Modern Thought
- Portus, G. V. (1928) The American Background
- Portus, G. V. (1931) Communism and Christianity
- Portus, G. V. (1933) Australia — An Economic Interpretation
- Portus, G. V. (1944) They Wanted to Rule the World
- Portus, G. V. (1953) Happy Highway, his autobiography
