= Helen Jones (disambiguation) =

Helen Jones (born 1954) is a British Labour politician.

Helen Jones may also refer to:

- Helen Jones (actress), Australian actress
- Helen Mary Jones (born 1960), Welsh Plaid Cymru politician
- Helen Patricia Jones (1926–2018), South Australian historian and educationist
- Helen Jones-Kelley, director of the Ohio Department of Job and Family Services
- Helen Jones Woods (1923–2020)), American jazz trombonist
- Helen Jones, character in Curfew (2024 TV series)

== See also ==
- Ellen Jones (disambiguation)
