= NHRS =

NHRS may refer to:

- New Hampshire Retirement System
- Newcastle and Hunter River Steamship Company (NHRS Co.)
