= Valerie Fisher =

Australian women's advocate

Valerie Claire Fisher AO
- Born: 15 May 1927; Melbourne, Victoria, Australia
- Died: 19 April 2013 (aged 85); Wodonga, Victoria, Australia
- Occupation: women's advocate
- Known for: serving as the national president of the CWA and world leader of the ACWW

Valerie Claire Fisher AO (née Olholm, 15 May 1927 – 19 April 2013) was an Australian women's advocate.

She is best known for her leadership in the Country Women's Association, having served as its national president as well as the world president of its parent organisation the Associated Country Women of the World.

== Biography ==
Fisher grew up in Melbourne and moved to the rural town of Barnawartha.

After her marriage in 1950, she was informed by a neighbour that there had been a proposal to start a local Barnawartha branch of the Country Women's Association, and was invited to attend a meeting being held to gauge interest.

Being from Melbourne, Fisher was unfamiliar with the organisation but agreed to attend the meeting. The local branch was successfully established in 1952 and attracted a membership of approximately fifty local women of a variety of ages, with Fisher became one of the foundation members Fisher was then appointed as the branch secretary before becoming president, and then the group president.

Fisher's duties expanded when she became the organisation's state president in 1973. In 1975, Fisher was appointed as the national president.

Following the conclusion of her term as CWA national president, Fisher was appointed as the South Pacific Area president of the Associated Country Women of the World in 1977, despite never having travelled outside of Australia. In this role, she travelled to locations such as Tonga, Fiji and the Cook Islands.

Fisher was critical of foreign tourists from countries who would aggressively barter with Tongan women who were attempting to sell handmade baskets and mats to raise enough money for their children's education.

During her term as South Pacific Area president, Fisher coordinated a project which saw the construction of cement kitchen huts to enable Tongan women to cook. These replaced old thatched huts which were exposed to the heavy rainfall and regularly prevented the women from starting their fires they would use for cooking, which would see their children go without breakfast.

Fisher also organised resource training teams with experts in various fields to travel to the Pacific Islands to assist women in any way they could. According to Fisher, three women who became government senators in Fiji credited their achievements with the training they received from the leadership training courses offered by the Associated Country Women of the World.

Her work in the Pacific led to Fisher being appointed to the position of chairperson of World Development Projects within the ACWW.

Fisher was then appointed as the deputy world president in 1983. She continued in this role until her election as world president at the organisation's 18th triennial conference held in Kansas City in Missouri.

For nine years between 1989 and 1998, Fisher travelled across the world, attending various events in connection with her role as world president.

Fisher said one of her most pleasing achievements from this job was when the Norwegian Government asked her to submit a proposal as to how the ACWW could use money raised in Norway's annual telethon in 1989. Fisher's proposal involved offering workshops in various locations throughout the world, focusing on the needs of the women in each region, and then assessing the results two years later. The proposal was accepted and 600,000 pounds was raised from the telethon for the ACWW.

Another role Fisher was appointed to was as a member of the first women's advisory council to the Prime Minister of Australia in 1976.

== Honours ==
In the 1982 New Year Honours, Fisher was made an Officer of the Order of the British Empire in recognition of her service to women's affairs.

Fisher was appointed as an Officer of the Order of Australia in the 1995 Australia Day Honours in recognition of her service to raising the status of women in developing countries through her work with the Associated Country Women of the World.

== Personal life and death ==
She married Harold Robert Fisher on 18 February 1950.

Fisher died in Wodonga on 19 April 2013.
