= The Advocate (Tasmania) =

Newspaper in North West and Western Tasmania, Australia

- Front page
- Type: Daily newspaper
- Format: Tabloid
- Owner: Australian Community Media
- Editor: Anthony Haneveer
- Founded: 1 October 1890
- Headquarters: 39-41 Alexander Street, Burnie, Tasmania, Australia
- Website: www.theadvocate.com.au

The Advocate is a local newspaper of North-West and Western Tasmania, Australia. It was formerly published under the names The Wellington Times, The Emu Bay Times, and The North Western Advocate and the Emu Bay Times.

Its readership covers the North West Coast and West Coast of Tasmania, including towns such as Devonport, Burnie, Ulverstone, Penguin, Wynyard, Latrobe, and Smithton.

As of 2021 the newspaper was published by Australian Community Media, located at 39-41 Alexander Street, Burnie, Tasmania.

== History ==
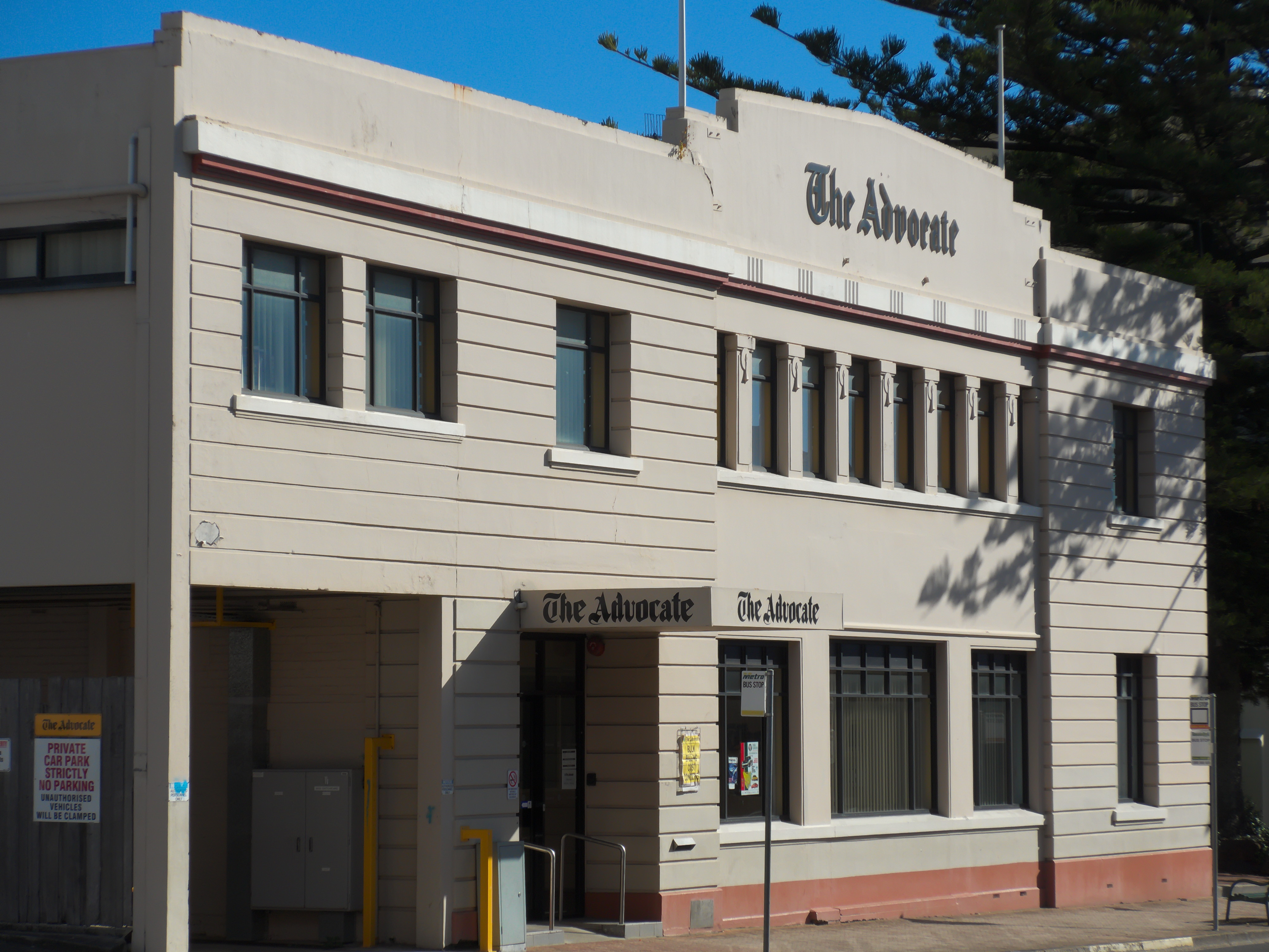
The former headquarters of The Advocate on Mount Street.

On Wednesday 1 October 1890 Robert Harris and his sons, Robert and Charles published the first issue of The Wellington Times, Burnie's first newspaper. It was named after the county in which Burnie and Emu Bay were located and was first published only on Wednesdays and Saturdays. With a circulation around 2000 its four broadsheet pages cost 1.5 d.

The original Burnie Wellington Times office in 1890 stood on a site in Cattley Street and employed a staff of 10. In 1892 The Wellington Times was made a tri-weekly, appearing on Tuesday, Thursday and Saturday and on 2 November 1897, the name was changed to The Emu Bay Times reflecting the area in which it was published. The success of the newspaper encouraged the proprietors to extend operations to Devonport and on 4 January 1899 the tri-weekly The North Western Advocate and Agricultural and Mining Gazette was produced.

The separate publication of the two newspapers lasted only 11 months by which time the Government Railway had reached Burnie and on 13 November 1899 the two publications amalgamated to become a daily newspaper, The North Western Advocate and the Emu Bay Times. In 1902, new premises had been erected in Mount Street, at the present (2010) site and the staff had increased to 26. In the last decade of the 19th century, the North-West and West Coast were served by a number of daily publications - but by 1920 The Advocate was the sole survivor. The title was shortened to The Advocate in 1916.

In the 1950s The Advocate was one of the first daily newspapers in Australia to use colour in advertisements and in 1968 it was the first daily newspaper in Australia to publish on a Web-Offset press which today is the industry standard. Over the three years from 1993 to 1996, The Advocate embarked on a technology development programme that resulted in computer based full-page negative output on 1 October 1996.

In 2004, The Advocate became the third largest regional daily of Rural Press thereby ending the involvement of the Harris family for the first time since inception. In 2008, Rural Press became part of Fairfax Media.

In 2009 all printing was centralised in Launceston, at a print facility run by The Examiner, a former rival publication that was owned by Fairfax Media, the then-owner of The Advocate. The press was dismantled and shipped off to a newspaper in New Zealand, where it was deployed at another newspaper owned by the Fairfax Media group.

The Advocate anniversary and celebratory editions regularly draw on the historical photographs of the newspaper.

Nine Entertainment briefly owned the newspaper after its $4-billion merger with Fairfax Media in July 2018. However, that changed when The Advocate along with 160 regional mastheads owned by Fairfax were purchased by media entrepreneur Anthony Catalano for $115 million, who owns Australian Community Media.

== Ownership and leadership ==
As of 2021 the newspaper is published by Australian Community Media and located at 39-41 Alexander Street Burnie.

Anthony Haneveer was appointed editor in March 2022 following the departure of Luke Sayer. Haneveer previously served as the paper's deputy for four years. He replaced Luke Sayer, who was appointed editor in 2017.

== Notable staff ==
- Kerry Pink, a journalist of more than 40 years and local historian, author of And Wealth for Toil: A History of North-West and Western Tasmania 1825-1900 and other books.
