= Kerry Pink =

Tasmanian writer

Kerry George Pink OAM (born c. 1931) was a Tasmanian journalist in Burnie with The Advocate in the north west of Tasmania for 40 years. He also wrote histories about Western Tasmania and the north coast of Tasmania, and contributed the article on George Renison Bell published by the Australian Dictionary of Biography. His contribution to journalism was recognised by the award of the Medal of the Order of Australia in the 1995 Australia Day Honours.

== Selected works ==
- Pink, Kerry; West Coast Pioneers' Memorial Museum (Zeehan, Tas) (1982), The West Coast story : a history of Western Tasmania and its mining fields, West Coast Pioneers' Memorial Museum, ISBN 978-0-9598295-1-8
- Pink, Kerry; Advocate (Burnie, Tas.) (1984), Through Hells Gates : (a history of Strahan and Macquarie Harbour), Burnie, Tasmania Advocate Newspaper, ISBN 978-0-9590551-0-8
- Pink, Kerry; Ebdon, Annette; Circular Head Bicentennial History Group (1988), Beyond the ramparts : a bicentennial history of Circular Head, Circular Head Bicentennial History Group, ISBN 978-0-7316-3288-6
- Pink, Kerry (1990), And wealth for toil : a history of North-West and Western Tasmania, 1825-1900, Advocate Marketing Services, ISBN 978-0-7316-9927-8
- Pink, Kerry (2000), Campsite to city : a history of Burnie 1827-2000, Burnie City Council, ISBN 978-0-646-40532-2*
