= Jim Kennedy (businessman) =

Australian businessman (1934–2021)

Jim Kennedy AO CBE
- Born: 8 April 1934
- Died: 17 September 2021 (aged 87); Brisbane, Queensland, Australia
- Occupation: Businessman
- Known for: Work in the Australian business and tourism sectors

James Joseph Kennedy AO CBE (8 April 1934 – 17 September 2021) was an Australian businessman and chartered accountant who was best known for his extensive work in the Australian business and tourism sectors.

== Life and career ==
Throughout his career, Kennedy continues to serve on numerous company boards, including that of Qantas, the Commonwealth Bank, Suncorp, Santos, Pacific Dunlop and GWA Group. He was also the longest-serving director of the Australian Securities Exchange.

Kennedy also conducted several government inquiries including the one that prompted the closure of Boggo Road Gaol. After serving as a member of the Royal Commission of Enquiry into the Department of Post and Telegraph in 1973, Kennedy was appointed as the foundation chairman of the Australian Postal Commission in 1975. He is also credited with helping establish the Queensland Investment Corporation.

Throughout his lifetime, he owned several island resorts, including on Daydream Island, South Molle Island and Tangalooma.

Kennedy died on 16 September 2021, at the age of 87.

He was married with five children.

== Awards ==
Kennedy was a life member of the Institute of Chartered Accountants Australia.

In the 1982 Queen's Birthday Honours, Kennedy was made a Commander of the Most Excellent Order of the British Empire in recognition of his service to the community.

He was subsequently made an Officer of the Order of Australia in the 1995 Australia Day Honours for his service to the business and tourism sectors.

The Queensland University of Technology awarded Kennedy an honorary doctorate in 1995.

In 2001, Kennedy received the Centenary Medal in recognition of his service to finance and business.

Kennedy was named as a Queensland Great in 2006 and was inducted into the Queensland Business Leaders Hall of Fame in 2009.
