= Leslie Williams =

Leslie Williams may refer to:

- Leslie Williams (rugby) (1922–2006), Welsh rugby union, and rugby league footballer of the 1940s and 1950s
- The Leslie Williams Award for Best and Fairest Player, awarded at the Hong Kong Sevens
- Leslie Williams (archdeacon of Chester) (1919–2013), archdeacon of Chester, 1975–1988
- Leslie Williams (archdeacon of Bristol) (1909–1996), archdeacon of Bristol, 1967–1979
- Leslie Williams (politician), Australian member of the New South Wales Legislative Assembly
- L. Pearce Williams (1927–2015), professor of the history of science at Cornell University
- Leslie Allen Williams (born 1953), American serial killer, rapist, and necrophile

== See also ==
- Les Williams (disambiguation)
