= Alec MacKelden =

Australian businessman and WWII veteran

Alec Frank MacKelden AM MC
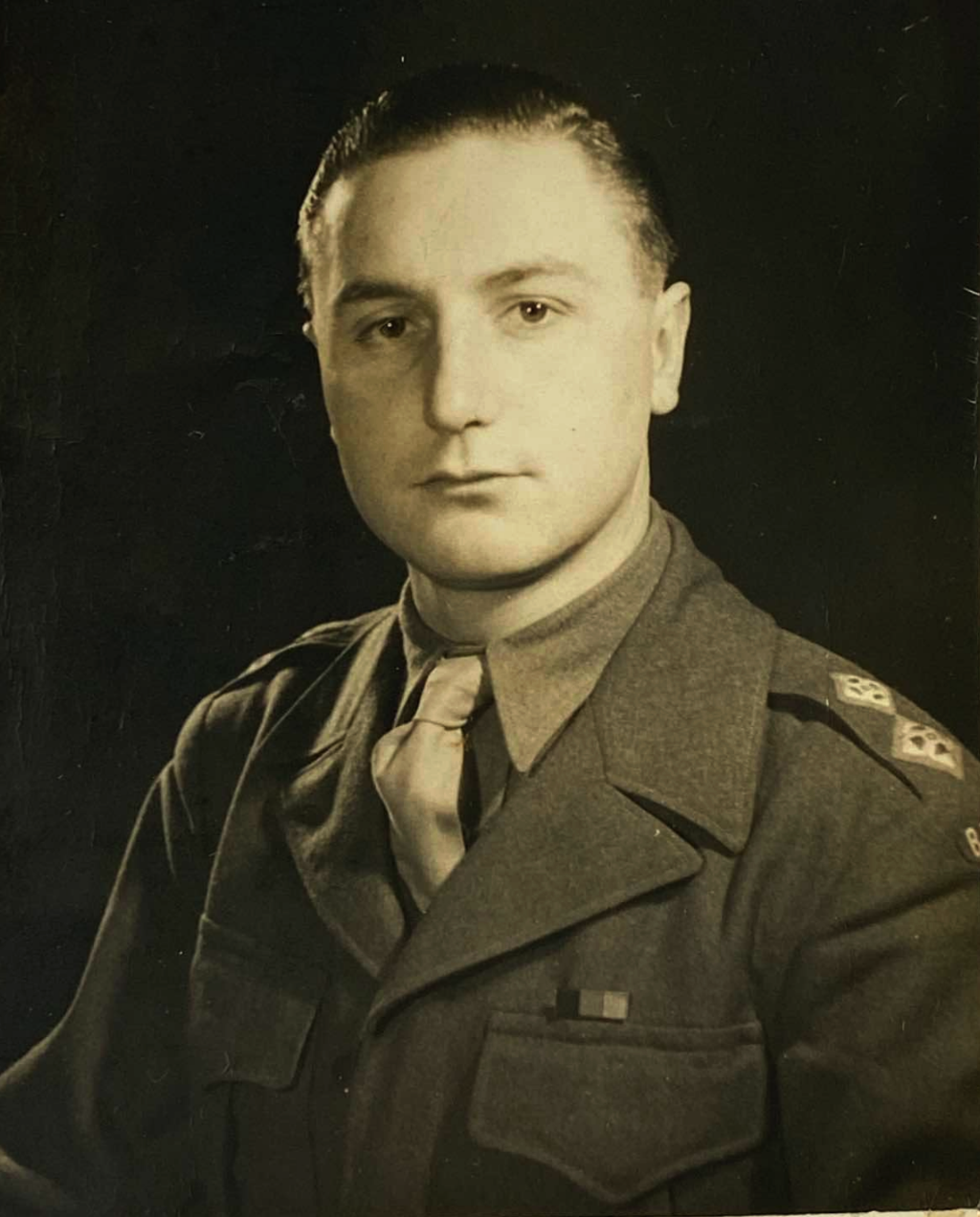
- Alec MacKelden in British Army uniform, c. 1943
- Born: 9 August 1922; Richmond, Surrey, England
- Died: 21 October 2008 (aged 86); Gold Coast, Queensland, Australia
- Spouse: Patricia MacKelden (m. 1942–2008)
- Children: 2
- Military career
- Allegiance: United Kingdom
- Branch: British Army
- Service years: 1939–1946
- Rank: Lieutenant
- Unit: The Buffs (Royal East Kent Regiment)
- Conflicts: World War II: Italian Campaign; Anzio; Gothic Line; Operation Roast
- Awards: Military Cross (1945); Member of the Order of Australia (1995)

Alec Frank MacKelden (9 August 1922 – 21 October 2008) was a British-born World War II veteran and Australian food industry executive. He served as a Lieutenant with The Buffs (Royal East Kent Regiment) during the Italian Campaign and was awarded the Military Cross for gallantry in 1945. After emigrating to Australia in 1955, he had a career in the food and beverage industry, most notably as Managing Director of Cerebos Australia Limited (1962–1982), and subsequently served as a director of several major companies including Steamships Trading Company Limited in Papua New Guinea (1984–1989). He later served as the inaugural non-medically qualified Chairman of the Skin and Cancer Foundation of Australia (1986–1995), for which he was appointed a Member of the Order of Australia (AM) in the 1995 Australia Day Honours.

== Early life and education ==
Alec Frank MacKelden was born on 9 August 1922 in Richmond, Surrey, England. His family later moved to Brighton, where they lived above the grocery store at 148 Springfield Road owned by his paternal grandfather, Frank MacKelden. Electoral registers record Alec's father, Frank Bowyer MacKelden, as resident at the same address in 1928, while his grandfather's own registered abode was nearby at 88 Edburton Avenue. The family moved to Canterbury in November 1934, where he was educated at St. Dunstan's Church of England School, serving as Head Prefect.

== Military service ==
=== Enlistment (1939) ===
MacKelden enlisted in the British Army on 3 October 1939, one month after the declaration of war, and served with the 4th Battalion, The Buffs (Royal East Kent Regiment). He was commissioned as a Second Lieutenant into The Buffs on 13 November 1943 after completing officer training at the Officer Cadet Training Unit, Morecambe.

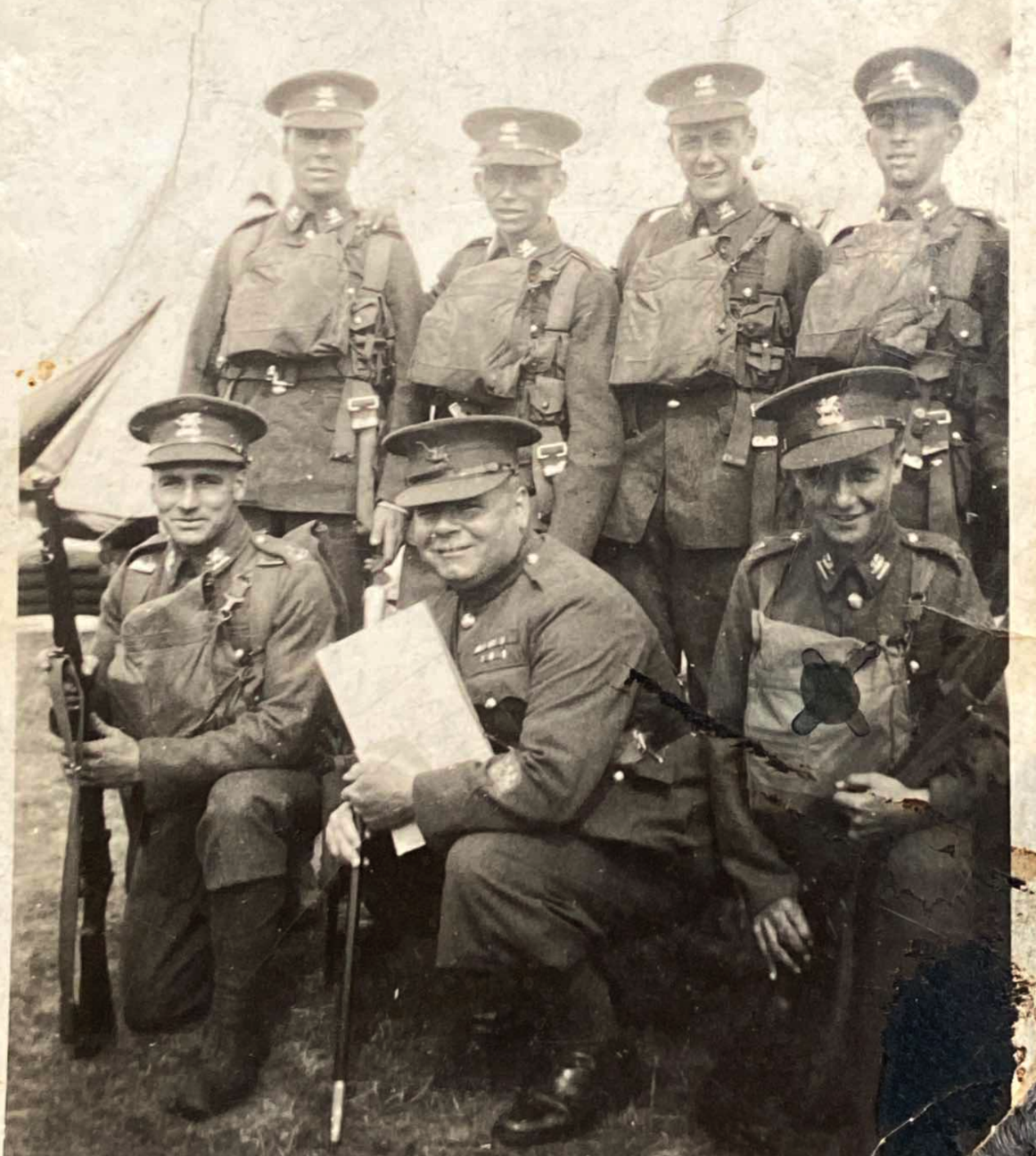
Alec MacKelden (bottom right) with officers of The Buffs, c. 1944

A regimental newsletter from January 1944 records his joining 'D' Company of the 2nd Battalion: "We welcome several new Officers to the best Company in the Battalion, 2/Lieuts. Cade, Mackelden and Willis."

=== Italian Campaign (1944–1945) ===
MacKelden served with the 1st Battalion, The Buffs, as part of the 24th Guards Brigade during the Italian Campaign, seeing action at Anzio, the Gothic Line, and Operation Roast (the Comacchio Lagoon) the final offensive in northern Italy in 1945.

For his actions on 13–14 and 24 April 1945, MacKelden was awarded the Military Cross. The citation, published in The London Gazette, records that on 13 April 1945 he commanded the point platoon of 'B' Company, ordered to advance over 3,000 yards along a bund road at Lake Comacchio to contact companies landed by amphibious vehicles behind enemy lines. "In spite of heavy enemy shelling and Spandau fire which caused casualties within his platoon, Lieut. MacKelden attacked with such dash and resolution that several enemy strong points were wiped out and many prisoners taken." During the 3,000-yard advance, B Company took prisoner three officers and 148 other ranks.

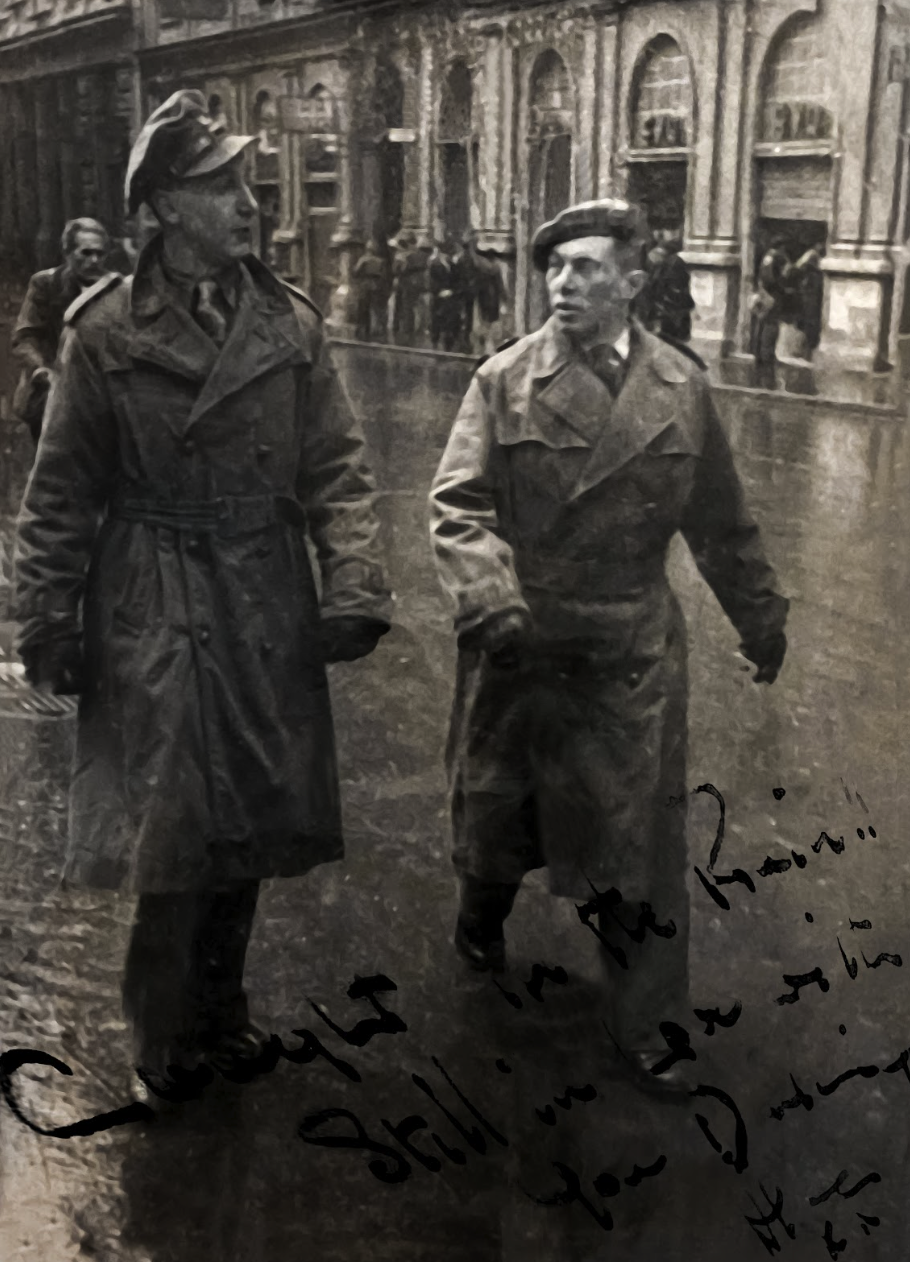
Alec MacKelden (left) in Rome

On 24 April 1945, he was ordered to cross the Canale Bianco in assault boats and capture enemy-held farm buildings 400 yards from the far bank. The citation states he "personally led the assault and attacked with such resolution that the two Spandau posts were silenced, three Officers and 34 O.R.'s were captured, and many killed and wounded." A further 30 other ranks were taken in mopping up. The citation concluded: "This officer's personal bravery, leadership and disregard for personal safety inspired the utmost confidence in the men, and this highly successful action enabled a substantial bridgehead to be established which was an essential thing for future operations."

His MC was also noted in the Canterbury press under the headline 'Old St. Dunstan's MC', which reported that he was "the first old boy of St. Dunstan's School, Canterbury to be decorated by His Majesty The King with the Military Cross." A contemporaneous report published in the Cleveland Standard on 2 June 1945, headlined 'With Our Forces Overseas: Local Officer's Dashing Attack' and written by a Military Observer, described the Lake Comacchio action in detail, naming MacKelden directly and recounting his platoon's assault across the road and the subsequent canal crossing.

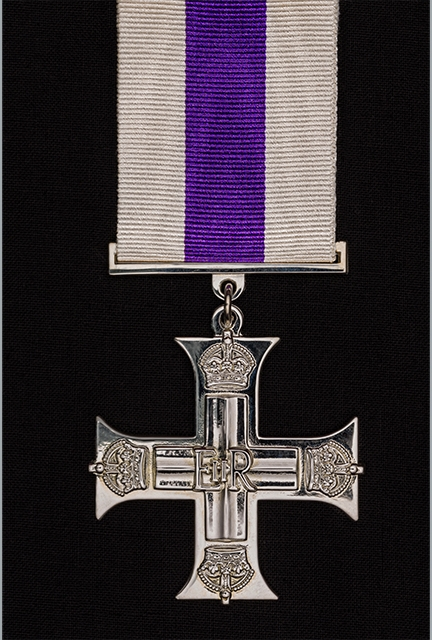
Military Cross

MacKelden was demobilised on 12 July 1946 after six years and nine months of service.

== Food industry career in Australia ==
MacKelden emigrated to Australia with his family in 1955. He subsequently held senior executive roles in the Australian food and beverage industry.

=== Thomas J. Lipton (1958–1962) ===
MacKelden's appointment as General Manager of Thomas J. Lipton (Australia) Limited was reported in The Bulletin on 19 February 1958: "Lipton's, about to expand in the Australian tea market, has appointed Alec F. MacKelden its new general-manager. He has the form in the food business. A Londoner, he was with Symington's, one of the largest (in soups and custards) manufacturers in Europe, and he came to Australia two years ago to join Trufood. He spent the war in the British Army, collected the M.C. in Italy, and a chest wound at the Anzio beachhead that has kept him off the sports-field ever since."

A feature article in the UK Mail credits him with introducing the tea bag to Australia, describing how he imported a German-made packing machine and launched the product on New Year's Eve 1958: "I believed it wouldn't work unless other tea manufacturers got into it, so I brought in a German machine and offered to make tea-bags for my opposite number, a very large competitor, as well as ourselves." The article reports that after initial slow retail uptake, a strategy of selling bulk packs to the hotel and motel industry created broad consumer familiarity, after which domestic sales accelerated: "The rest is history. Lipton's became No. 1 in the tea business."

The introduction of the Lipton tea bag to the Australian market in 1959 is independently documented by the Australian Food Timeline, which records that Lipton was advertising tea bags in Australia that year and links to a contemporaneous Lipton advertisement archived on Trove (National Library of Australia).

=== Cerebos Australia (1962–1982) ===
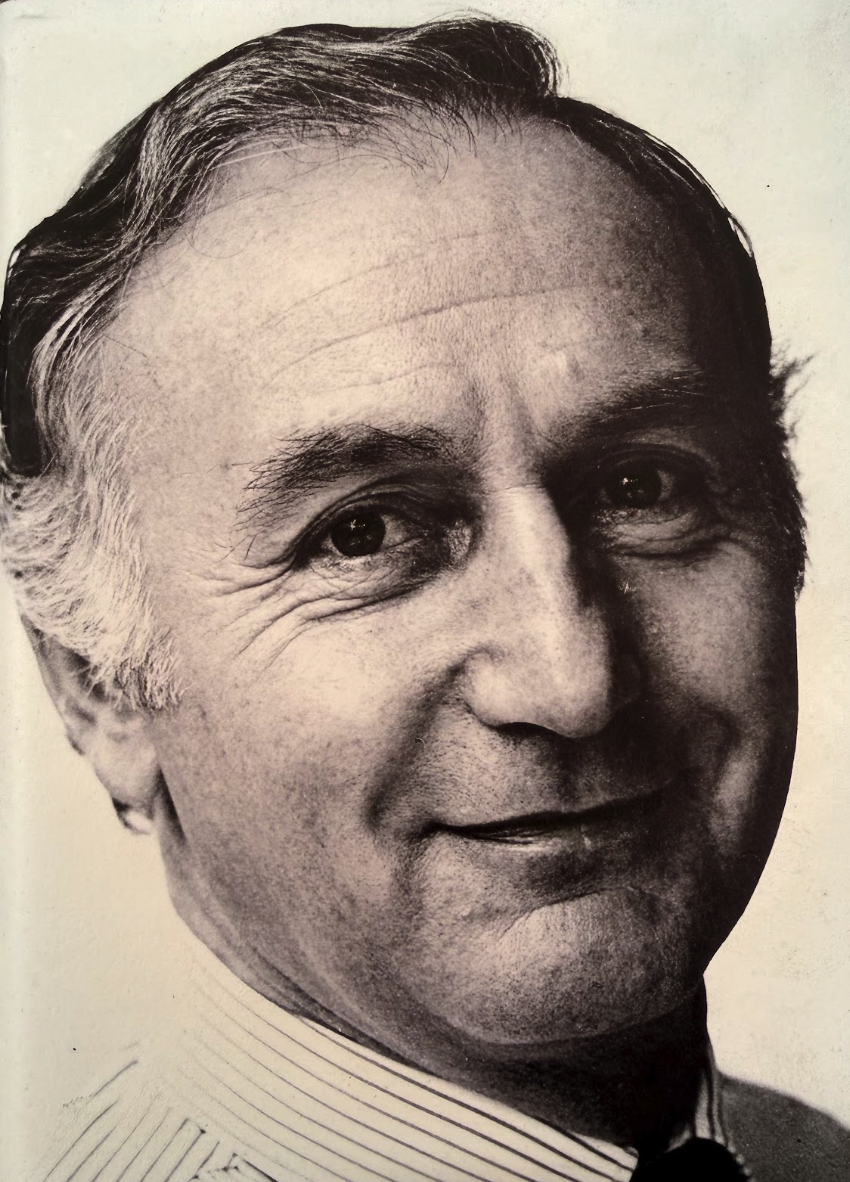
Alec MacKelden, Managing Director, Cerebos, 1962-1982

MacKelden served as Managing Director of Cerebos Australia, a position he held from 1962 until his retirement in 1982. A 1977 feature article in The Sydney Morning Herald, headlined 'In tomato-sauce land, it really works', profiled MacKelden and Cerebos as one of two Sydney experiments in worker participation, identifying him as managing director of the Cerebos Seven Hills plant and quoting him directly on the company's management philosophy. The article noted that Cerebos had moved all staff to annual salaries and established a Works Committee giving workers representation on production, conditions and the future. An earlier profile in The Sunday Australian on 28 March 1971 also named him as managing director of Cerebos, reporting on new product development and the company's marketing strategy. The UK Mail feature by Desmond Zwar additionally describes him as "the Managing Director of Cerebos (the Australian cereal, dessert, salt, sauce, gravy and wine conglomerate)".

=== Other board appointments ===
Following his retirement from Cerebos, MacKelden served on the Board of David's Holdings, at the time Australia's largest food and liquor wholesaling company — the predecessor organisation to Metcash Trading Limited (rebranded 2000, ASX: MTS). He was also appointed Chairman of the NSW Egg Corporation by the New South Wales Government. His appointment is recorded in the Government Gazette of New South Wales dated 14 December 1984, which states that the Governor "has been pleased to appoint Alec Frank MacKelden as a member and Chairman of the New South Wales Egg Corporation, representing producers vice John Joseph David for the remainder of his term of office expiring on 30th June, 1986." His departure from the role is confirmed by a further Gazette notice dated 8 September 1987, recording the appointment of his successor "vice Alec Frank MacKelden, of Double Bay, for the remainder of his term of office expiring on 30th June, 1989", establishing that he served as Chairman from December 1984 until September 1987.

MacKelden also served as a Director of Steamships Trading Company Limited, Papua New Guinea's largest diversified trading conglomerate. He joined the Board on 29 September 1984. The company's authorised history, Steamships Trading Company 1918–2018: A History by James Sinclair, describes him as having "recently retired from a senior position in the overseas food industry" and notes he "was especially interested in manufacturing, and the retail marketing and wholesale distribution fields", adding that "he was to be a particularly active Director." The history records his recommendation that the board take immediate action in the Merchandise Division "to cut out the bleeding" during a difficult trading period, and his caution that "considerable caution" be exercised before concluding a joint venture agreement with Colgate-Palmolive. He retired from the Steamships board at the Annual General Meeting in November 1989.

== Philanthropy ==
MacKelden joined the Board of the Skin and Cancer Foundation of Australia in July 1985, and became Chairman in 1986. The Foundation's 2022 Annual Report records him as "past chairman of the board", noting he was "awarded the OAM" in 1995.

Order of Australia

The Commonwealth of Australia Gazette entry for his AM award states he was recognised "for service to the community, particularly as Chairman of the Skin and Cancer Foundation of Australia." The Foundation's nomination supporting material records that under his chairmanship the Foundation increased annual patient services from 2,100 to 3,600; introduced the MOHS microscopically controlled excision procedure for skin cancer to western Sydney via the Westmead branch, increasing annual procedures from 50 to 400; established a pigmented lesion and melanoma clinic; expanded facilities at Darlinghurst and Westmead; and significantly increased public awareness of skin cancer risks and sun protection.

== Honours and awards ==
Award	For	Year / Source
Military Cross (MC)	Gallantry and leadership, Lake Comacchio and Canale Bianco, Italy, April 1945	1945; The London Gazette
Member of the Order of Australia (AM)	Services to medicine and public health, as Chairman of the Skin and Cancer Foundation of Australia	1995 Australia Day Honours
