= Mary Ellen Jones =

Mary Ellen Jones may refer to:

- Mary Ellen Jones (politician) (born 1936), educator and politician in New York State
- Mary Ellen Jones (chemist) (1922–1996), American biochemist
- Mary Ellen Jones (1817–1865), wife of Robertson Gladstone

== See also ==
- Mary Jones (disambiguation)
- Ellen Jones (disambiguation)
