= Frances Crampton =

Australian gymnastics coach (1945–2025)

Frances Tonia Crampton AM (7 December 1945 – 8 May 2025) was an Australian gymnastics coach and official and leading Australian sport administrator.

== Life and career ==
Crampton was born and grew up in Perth, Western Australia and trained under her Hungarian physical education teacher. She retired from competitive gymnastics when started training as a physical education teacher and coach. She became interested in rhythmic gymnastics and was appointed its first national director. She taught physical education and coached gymnastics in Perth and Melbourne.

From 1970 to 1985, she was the Australian Gymnastic Federation Women's Artistic Technical Director. In 1984, she resigned from her Melbourne teaching position to become the Australian Institute of Sport Women's Artistic and Rhythmic Coordinator. She left the position in 1987 when appointed CEO of Gymnastics New South Wales, a position she held until 2000. She was Gymnastics NSW State Coordinator of "Fitter for Life" from 2019.

In 1972, she the first Australian woman to become an internationally licensed judge. She represented Australia at five Olympic Games from 1976 and five Commonwealth Games in roles ranging from team manager to commentator and production manager.

Crampton was a Gymnastics Australia Board Member from 2012 to 2016. She was made a Life Member of Gymnastics Australia.

=== Personal life and death ===
Crampton was born in Perth on 7 December 1945 to Francis Robert Hesleden (Rob) Binney and Jeanne Stella Play. She was married to sport psychologist John Crampton. She was a civil celebrant.

Frances Crampton died after a long battle with cancer on 8 May 2025, at the age of 79.

== Sport administration ==
After moving on from gymnastics coaching and administration, Crampton held numerous sport admninistration positions including:

- Sports Women's Association of Western Australia Inaugural President
- Sport NSW (formerly New South Wales Sports Federation): Chair 1991 to 2009 and Acting CEO 2013. In 1991, she helped to establish the organisation due to inadequate state government funding to state sports organisations. She instigated their annual awards.
- Women's Golf NSW CEO: 2002 to 2007
- Golf Australia National Director of Golf Development: 2009 to 2012
- Jack Newton Junior Golf Board Member
- Softball New South Wales: Board Member 2012 to 2018, President 2015 to 2018. She assisted the organisation with governance and instigated the Pillars of Recognition at the NSW Softball Centre.

== Recognition ==
- 1990 – NSW Sports Administrator of the Year with bi-monthly awards in 1993 and 1995
- 1995 – Medal of the Order of Australia OAM) in recognition of service to the sport of gymnastics.
- 2000 – Australian Sports Medal for outstanding service as an official.
- 2004 – Member of the Order of Australia (AM) for service to sport through a range of organisations that promote sport in all areas of the community from amateur to elite levels.
- Life Member – Gymnastics NSW, Gymnastics Australia, Sport NSW and the Australian Society of Sports Administrators.
- Honorary Member - Golf NSW/Women's Golf NSW
