= Helen Patricia Jones =

Australian public figure

Helen Patricia Jones née Cashmore (5 September 1926 – 6 July 2018) was a South Australian academic, historian, and author.

== History ==
Jones was born in Adelaide, the eldest child of Myrtle Elizabeth Cashmore and master baker Arthur Herbert Cashmore (Note: A. H. Cashmore was involved in the company behind Maurice Kaye Williamson's revolutionary "Kaye" engine. and was the proprietor of the Maltina Bakery, 169 Henley Beach Road, Torrensville.) (11 February 1899 – 24 March 1954) of Henley Beach Road, Lockleys. who married on 3 November 1923. She was educated at Lockleys Primary School and Walford House School, where in 1942 she excelled in Ancient History and English composition. and in History and Economics at the Leaving examinations if 1943. She passed her BA (honours) in Political Science and History at the University of Adelaide in 1948, mentored by G. V. "Jerry" Portus. She began work as a cadet at the university's Barr Smith Library and had begun work on her MA thesis and lecturing at the university when on 8 January 1949 she married Dr Geoffrey Jones. In 1952 she gave birth to a son and suspended her career and studies to raise what became a family of four.

She returned to her studies in the mid-1960s, submitting her MA thesis The History of commercial education in South Australia with special reference to women in 1969. She joined the staff of the Adelaide Kindergarten Training College (later to become De Lissa Institute of Early Childhood and Family Studies of the University of South Australia) as History lecturer, and following Portus's example began writing and broadcasting for the Australian Broadcasting Commission. She was consulted by the Australian Dictionary of Biography to identify names, especially of significant Australian women, for inclusion in the Dictionary. She wrote many articles herself. In 1982 her thesis Women's education in South Australia: Institutional and social developments 1875–1915 was accepted for her PhD.

== Publications ==
- Nothing Seemed Impossible: Women's Education and Social Change in South Australia 1875–1915 (1985), developed from her MA thesis.
- In Her Own Name: Women in South Australian History, a detailed account of the steps that led to South Australia granting eligible women the right to be registered on the Electoral Roll of South Australia.
- ADB articles on Mary Lee, Lillian de Lissa, Augusta Zadow, Mary Colton and twenty more.

== Recognition ==
Jones was appointed a Member of the Order of Australia in the 1995 Australia Day Honours, in recognition of her historical research. She was awarded the ADB Medal in 2010 for her contribution to the Australian Dictionary of Biography.
