= Les Williams (Australian footballer) =

Australian rules footballer (1923–1998)

Personal information
- Full name: Les Williams
- Born: 14 September 1923
- Died: 14 April 1998 (aged 74)
- Original team: South Melbourne Districts
- Height: 178 cm (5 ft 10 in)
- Weight: 76 kg (168 lb)

Playing career^{1}
Years	Club	Games (Goals)
1947–51	South Melbourne	48 (1)
- ^{1} Playing statistics correct to the end of 1951.

Les Williams (14 September 1923 – 14 April 1998) was an Australian rules footballer who played with South Melbourne in the Victorian Football League (VFL).
