= Ellen Jaffe Jones =

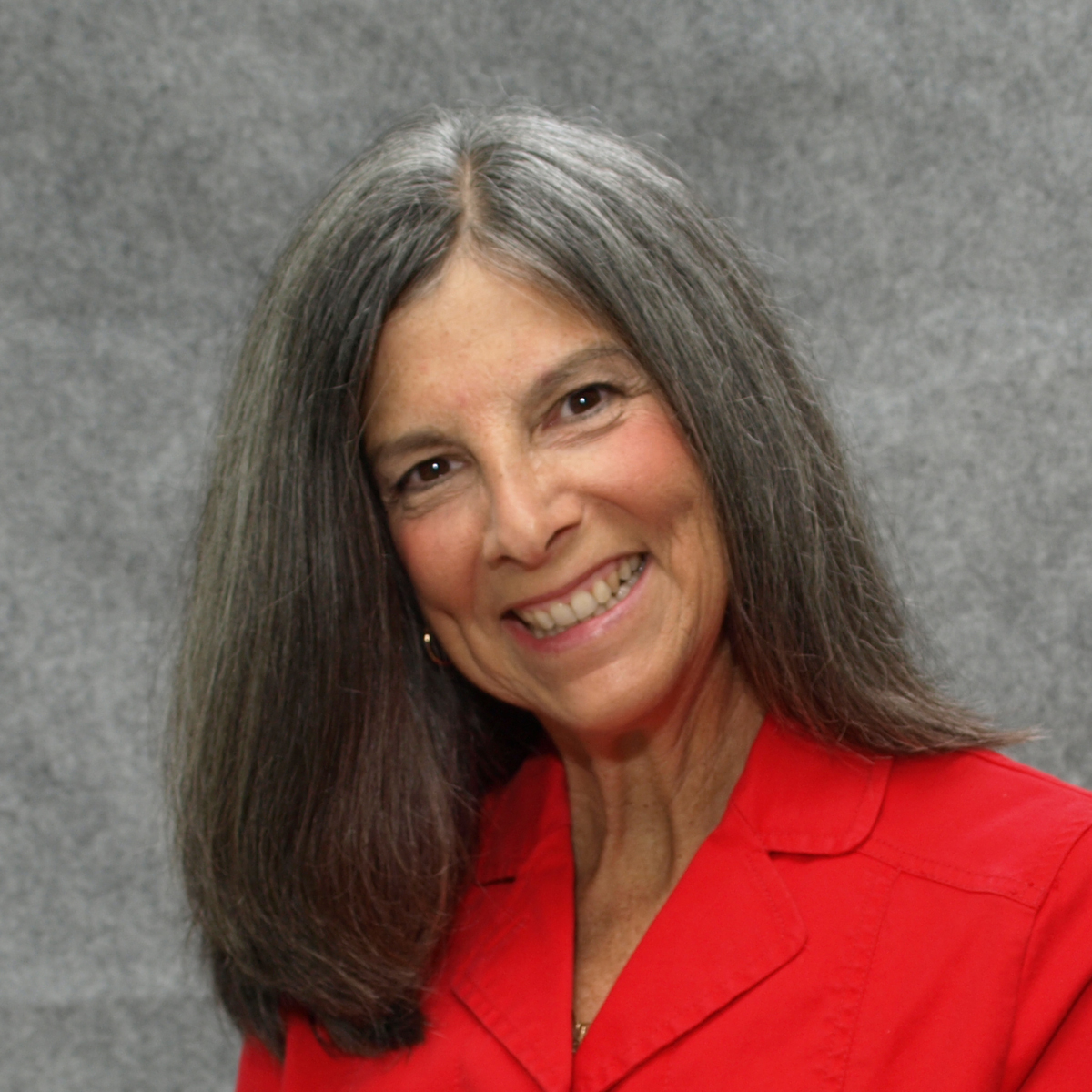
- Born: 19 November 1952 (age 73)
- Occupations: Athlete, writer

Ellen Jaffe Jones (born 19 November 1952) is an American athlete, certified personal trainer, health and fitness journalist and vegan writer.

== Biography ==
As a former TV investigative/consumer reporter/anchor in Des Moines, Miami, and St. Louis, Jones wrote her book after her mother, aunt, and both sisters had been diagnosed with breast cancer. Jones has won The National Press Club first place for the Best Consumer Journalism of 1984 and two Emmy Awards plus four Emmy nominations for her reporting.

Jones joined Smith Barney as a financial consultant, and during her 5 years, was the #1 market performer (how well she did for clients, not for herself) in 2001 at her branch which included downtown St. Louis. Jones joined her then-husband, Clarence, in his media consulting business, Winning News Media, Inc. She did media consulting for many vegan and vegetarian doctors, dietitians, and health care professionals and organizations.

She became a cooking instructor for the national non-profit, The Cancer Project, now known as Food for Life. She has been a runner since age 28, and became a certified personal trainer (AFAA) and certified running coach (RRCA). Before her book came out, she was the assistant volunteer coach for the girls' cross country team at Manatee High School in Bradenton, Florida. She is also a private personal trainer/running and walking coach in the Sarasota area of Florida.

In a 2012 interview, Jones stated that she has been a vegan for 30 years. At the 2019 National Senior Games in Albuquerque, Jones received a gold medal in the 4×100 meters. She placed 100th in the 800 and 1500 meters and was only one of two women in her 77-member age group to compete in all seven track events. The National Senior Games chose Jones to be the "Athlete of the Month" in April 2020. At the 2022 National Senior Games, held on May 10–23 in Fort Lauderdale, Jones finished third in her age group.

Jones is a Florida-licensed realtor, specializing in the Sarasota area.

== Vegan books ==
Jones is the author of Eat Vegan on $4 a Day-A Game Plan for the Budget Conscious Cook, published in 2011. Her book, The Kitchen Divided-Vegan Recipes for the Semi-Vegan Household was published in summer 2013. Paleo Vegan: Plant-Based Primal Recipes, was published in paperback by Book Publishing Company on March 10, 2014. followed by Vegan Fitness for Mortals (2016), Vegan Sex (2017, 2018) and Vegan for One (2017).
