= Lesley Williams =

Australian geneticist

Lesley Williams AM (23 December 1932–5 April 2016) was a scientist and academic at the University of Queensland and pioneer in the field of human cytogenetics.

== Early life ==
Lesley Merle Williams was born 23 December 1932 in Mackay, Queensland. She attended Newmarket State School and the Central Practising School, as well as Brisbane State High School. Lesley was co-captain of Brisbane State High School in 1950. She finished second in the state of Queensland in the senior exams of 1950, winning a scholarship to undertake study at the University of Queensland.

Williams graduated with her B.Sc. with First Class Honours in 1956. She continued further study taking her M.Sc. in 1959. She took a position in the Department of Bacteriology after graduation and later the Department Anatomy at the University of Queensland, becoming a lecturer in 1963.

== Career ==
Williams took her Th.A. in 1964, from the Australian College of Theology, in between her lecturing work at the University. She was director of the cytogenetics unit from 1963-1969. In this capacity, she undertook research into genetics, histochemistry and embryology of the human large intestine and published a number of papers. She discovered a new form of the enzyme, alkaline phosphatase in the large intestine. She worked toward her PhD, graduating in 1974.

Williams took a B.A. in 1978. She was interested in medical history, and would publish on its history within Queensland over a number of years. Her publications include:

- No easy path : the life and times of Lilian Violet Cooper MD, FRACS (1861-1947), Australia's first woman surgeon (1991)
- No man's land : a history of the 2nd Australian Women's Hospital (1997)
- Hygeia’s daughters: pioneer women in the health sciences in Queensland (1997)
- No Better Profession: medical women in Queensland 1891 to 1999 (2007).

In 1987, Williams travelled to the UK, undertaking research at the University of Bristol. While in Bristol she produced an interactive video - An atlas of histology, featuring 1000 histology slides collected from her personal collection of teaching resources. The video was released commercially.

Williams was promoted to Reader in the Department of Anatomical Sciences at the University of Queensland in 1992. She was recognised with a Member of the Order of Australia (AM), in 1995, for her services to medical education.

Williams retired to Tamborine Mountain, Queensland. She served in a number of capacities at her church at Tamborine and at St John’s Cathedral in Brisbane.

Lesley Williams died in Brisbane, Queensland on 5 April 2016.

== Memberships ==
Foundation Member of the UQ Alumni Association

Royal Historical Society of Queensland

Girls Friendly Society (Anglican)

== Awards ==
1989 The University of Queensland Excellence in Teaching Award

1992 Vice-Chancellor’s Prize

1995 Member of the Order of Australia for service in the fields of education, science and the study of medical history.

2007 AMA Award of Distinction
