= Newcastle and Hunter River Steamship Company =

Australian shipping company

The Newcastle and Hunter River Steamship Company (NHRS Co) was a shipping company of Australia. The company was created by the merger of the Newcastle Steamship Company and the Hunter River New Steam Navigation Company in 1891. It operated to 1956.

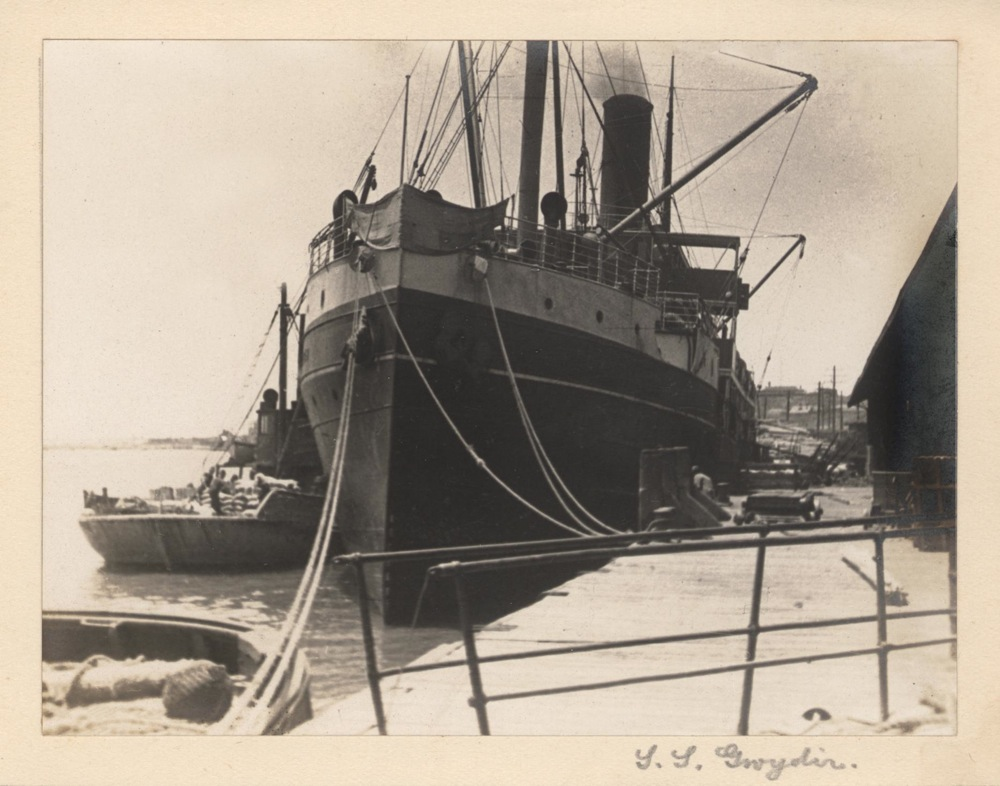
