= List of University of New South Wales faculty =

This is a list of notable current and former University of New South Wales staff.

== UNSW Faculty of Arts, Design and Architecture ==
=== Arts & Design ===
- Margaret Benyon, MBE, holographic artist
- Susan Best, FAHA, modern and contemporary art historian
- Fae Brauer, honorary associate professor of art history and cultural theory
- Paul Delprat, artist and principal of Julian Ashton Art School
- Paul Gladston, professor of contemporary art, specialising in Chinese contemporary art
- Richard J. Goodwin, professor of fine art and design
- Douglas Kahn, professor of media and innovation, theorist of energies in the arts and sound studies
- Sarah Kenderdine, adjunct professor of art and design, researcher of interactive and immersive experiences for museums and galleries
- George Poonkhin Khut, professor of electronic art
- Rod Milgate, professor of visual arts, painter and playwright
- Graeme Sullivan, professor of art, specialising in public art

=== Arts & Media ===
- Roger Covell, AM FAHA, senior lecturer in classical music, musicologist
- Kate Crawford, associate professor in journalism and media, researcher in social and political implications of artificial intelligence
- Paul Dawson, associate professor in creative writing, writer of poetry and fiction
- Suzanne Eggins, professor of English, researcher in systemic functional linguistics and critical discourse analysis
- Emma Jane, professor in media, researcher in social and ethical implications of emerging technologies
- Christopher Kremmer, professor in literary and narrative journalism practice
- Bem Le Hunte, professor of journalism and media, author
- Catharine Lumby, professor of journalism and media
- Louise Ravelli, professor of linguistics, researcher in discourse analysis and systemic functional grammar
- Michele Zappavigna, professor of linguistics, researcher in how people bond online

=== Built Environment ===
- Dijana Alić, associate professor of architecture
- Harry Howard, part-time architecture instructor
- Laszlo Peter Kollar, associate professor of architecture
- Laura Harding, professor of architectural design
- Richard Johnson, AO MBE, professor of architecture
- Sisi Zlatanova, professor of built environment, researcher in geospatial data, geographic information systems, and 3D modeling

=== Education ===
- Anne Burns, professor in teaching English as a second or foreign language
- John Bennett, AM, professor of education
- Michael Matthews, professor of education, researcher in history and philosophy in science education
- Miraca Gross, AM, professor of gifted education, author
- Pasi Sahlberg, professor of education, researcher in educational reform policy
- Trevor Cairney, OAM, professor of education

=== Humanities and Languages ===
- Alfred McCoy, professor of history, specialising in history of the Philippines, foreign policy of the United States, European colonisation of Southeast Asia, illegal drug trade and Central Intelligence Agency covert operations
- Alan Gilbert, AO FASSA, professor of history, specialising in social, socio-economic and religious history of modern Britain and Australia
- Allan Martin, AM FASSA FAHA, professor of history, specialising in Australian political history
- Anne O'Brien, professor of history, especially on issues relating to homelessness, welfare, women, gender and religion in Australia
- Beverley Kingston, FASSA, professor of history
- Bruce Scates, FASSA, professor of Australian history and Australian studies
- Charles Leonard Hamblin, professor of philosophy, introduction of Reverse Polish notation
- David Miller, FRHistS FAHA, professor of history and philosophy science
- David Oldroyd, professor of history of science
- David Stove, professor of philosophy, with main interests in philosophy of science, metaphysics and subjective idealism
- Gavan McDonell, professor of political sociology, researcher in national infrastructure policy reform and environmental sustainability
- Genevieve Lloyd, professor of philosophy, researcher in history of philosophy and feminist philosophy
- Grace Karskens, FRSN FASSA FAHA, professor of history, Colonial Australia and Aboriginal historian
- Ian Tyrrell, professor of history, specialising in American exceptionalism and transnational history
- James Auchmuty, CBE, FRHistS, Irish and Colonial Australia historian
- James Phillips, professor of philosophy, researcher in comparative literature and critical theory
- Jan Láníček, professor of history, specialising in modern European Jewish history
- Jean Chaussivert, professor of French, French poetry expert
- Joanne Faulkner, professor of gender studies
- John Milfull, professor of German, research in German literature
- Judith Robinson-Valéry, professor of French studies
- Heikki Ikäheimo, professor of philosophy, researcher in German idealism
- Konrad Kwiet, professor of history, specialising in history of the Holocaust
- Mark Diesendorf, sustainable energy policy researcher
- Martyn Lyons, FAHA, professor of history, researcher in European studies, specifically in Australian history and French history
- Mehreen Faruqi, lecturer of environmental studies, former senator for New South Wales
- Nicolas Rasmussen, FAHA, professor of history of science, researcher in history of amphetamines, substance abuse and clinical trial
- Niv Horesh, professor of Chinese studies
- Patrick O'Farrell, professor of Irish history, researcher in Roman catholicism in Australia and Irish Australian history
- Paul Patton, professor of philosophy, researcher in continental philosophy
- Rosalyn Diprose, professor in philosophy, researcher in 20th century european philosophy and existential phenomenology
- Simon Lumsden, associate professor of philosophy, researcher in subjectivism, German idealism and post-structuralism
- Stephen Hetherington, FAHA, professor of philosophy, researcher in analytic philosophy and epistemology
- Stephen Muecke, FAHA, professor of enthography, specialising in Indigenous Australians
- Vanessa Lemm, FRSN, professor of philosophy, head of School of Humanities and Languages (2012–2018)

=== Social Sciences ===
- Alison Ritter, AO FASSA, professor of social policy, researcher in drug policy in Australia
- Anthony Billingsley, political analyst, senior lecturer in Middle Eastern politics and International law
- Bettina Cass, AO FASSA, social policy researcher and adviser
- David Halperin, professor of sociology, researcher in gender studies, queer theory and critical theory
- Deborah Oxley, FRHistS FAcSS, professor of social sciences, specialising in Australian convicts
- Donald Horne, AO, professor of political science, journalist and social critic
- Eileen Baldry, AO FASSA FRSN, professor of criminal justice
- Gary Sturgess, AM, professor of public service delivery, researcher in public service in Sydney
- Gavin Kitching, professor of social sciences and international relations
- Ian McAllister, FASSA FRSE, professor of political science, specialising in Australian politics and elections
- Michael Wesley, professor of international relations, researcher in foreign policy, specifically in Asia
- Owen Harries, professor of foreign policy, founding editor of The National Interest
- Pat Dodson, inaugural director of the Indigenous Policy, Dialogue and Research Unit (2009–2012), followed by an honorary professorship
- Peter Saunders, AO FASSA, researcher in poverty, income distribution, household needs and living standards
- Rae Frances, AM FASSA, professor of women's studies
- Rorden Wilkinson, FAcSS FRSA, professor of international political economy
- Ruth Atkins, professor of political science
- Siobhan O'Sullivan, professor of social sciences, researcher in animal welfare policy and environmental ethics
- Sol Encel, professor of sociology, sociologist and political scientist
- Susan Kippax, AO FASSA, professor of social policy, researcher in social psychology
- Ted Trainer, professor of social work, researcher in global problems, sustainability issues and radical critiques of the economy
- Tony Vinson, AM, professor of social policy, specialising in social research, education, government services and prison reform
- Vicki Kirby, professor of sociology and anthropology

== UNSW Faculty of Business ==
- Alec Cameron, inaugural dean of UNSW Business School (2006-2012)
- Peter Shergold, AC FRSN, head of Centre for Social Impact, former secretary of Department of the Prime Minister and Cabinet

=== Australian Graduate School of Management ===
- Dexter Dunphy, AM FASSA, professor of business management theory, researcher in organisational behaviour
- Fred Hilmer, AO, dean and director of AGSM (1989–1998), vice chancellor of UNSW (2006–2015)
- Helen Nugent, AO, professor in management
- Pamela Hanrahan, professor of commercial law and financial services regulation

=== School of Banking & Finance ===
- Rebel A. Cole, finance professor, researcher in banking

=== School of Economics ===
- Andreas Ortmann, professor of experimental and behavioural economics
- John Piggott, AO FASSA, economics professor, researcher in economics of population ageing and pensions
- Pauline Grosjean, economics professor
- Robert Marks, economiscs professor
- Tim Harcourt, economics professor, advisor to the South Australian Government

=== School of Information Systems & Technology Management ===
- Fiona Balfour, AM, business executive in information technology
- Warden Boyd Rayward, FRSN, professor of information sciences, librarian

=== School of Management & Governance ===
- Mary-Anne Williams, FTSE, researcher of use of artificial intelligence in business

== UNSW Faculty of Engineering ==
- Gary Werskey, director of Professional Studies, historian of art and science

=== School of Chemical Engineering ===
- Philip Baxter, KBE CMG FAA, professor of chemical engineering, vice-chancellor of UNSW (1953–1969)
- Rose Amal, AC, photocatalysis researcher

=== School of Computer Science & Engineering ===
- Anne Ngu, middleware and quality of services researcher
- Arun Sharma, information technology researcher
- Brian Henderson-Sellers, object-oriented analysis researcher
- Carroll Morgan, formal methods researcher
- Christian Guttmann, artificial intelligence researcher
- Claude Sammut, artificial intelligence researcher
- Gabriele Keller, type systems and data parallelism in functional programming researcher
- Gernot Heiser, operating systems researcher
- Hussein Abbass, artificial intelligence researcher
- John Lions, Unix expert
- Ken Robinson, formal methods researcher
- Paul Justin Compton, proposer of ripple-down rules
- Sushmita Ruj, security researcher
- Toby Walsh, FAA, artificial intelligence researcher
- Wenjie Zhang, databases and data science researcher
- Xuemin Lin, databases and graph visualisation researcher

=== School of Electrical & Telecommunications Engineering ===
- Andrea Morello, professor of quantum engineering, specialising in high-temperature superconductivity
- Andrew Dzurak, professor of quantum engineering, cofounder of Diraq
- David Taubman, FTSE, professor of electrical engineering, specialising in image and video communications
- Eliathamby Ambikairajah, AO, professor of signal processing, head of Electrical & Telecommunications Engineering (2009-2019)
- Jinhong Yuan, professor of telecommunications, researcher in multi-antenna wireless communication technologies, head of Electrical & Telecommunications Engineering (2023–)
- John Kaye, professor of electrical engineering, researcher in sustainable energy policies, former member of New South Wales Legislative Council
- Rodica Ramer, professor of microelectronics, researcher in microwave antennas and electromagnetics
- Stephanie Simmons, research fellow in quantum computing, researcher on qubits associated with luminescent defects in silicon
- Vassilios Agelidis, professor of power engineering

=== School of Mechanical & Manufacturing Engineering ===
- Anne Simmons, AM FTSE, professor of biomechanical engineering, researcher in sterilisation of medical devices, extracorporeal systems and biostable biomaterials
- Guan Heng Yeoh, professor of material science, specialising in fire safety engineering
- Liangchi Zhang, mechanical engineer, researcher in manufacturing engineering and nanotechnology
- Shawn Kook, researcher in powertrain technologies for carbon neutral fuel combustion

=== School of Photovoltaic & Renewable Energy Engineering ===
- Armin Aberle, solar energy scientist
- Allen Barnett, professor of advanced photovoltaics
- Martin Green, AM FRS FAA, professor of solar photovoltaics, researcher in solar energy
- Xiaojing Hao, professor of solar photovoltaics

== UNSW Faculty of Law & Justice ==
=== School of Global & Public Law ===
- Ben Saul, FASSA, professor of international law, United Nations special rapporteur on counter-terrorism and human rights
- Cassandra Goldie, AO, adjunct professor of law, CEO of Australian Council of Social Service
- Deirdre O'Connor, professor of law, first female judge of the Federal Court of Australia
- George Winterton, professor of constitutional law
- Guy Goodwin-Gill, professor of refugee law
- Hal Wootten, AC QC, professor of law, inaugural dean of Faculty of Law, puisne judge of the Supreme Court of New South Wales
- Jane McAdam, AO FASSA, professor of refugee law, expert in climate change and refugee law
- Julius Stone, AO OBE, professor of jurisprudence and international law
- Louise Chappell, FASSA, political scientist, researcher in gender politics and International Criminal Court
- Mark Aronson, professor of administrative and public law
- Martin Krygier, AM FASSA, professor of law and social theory
- Megan Davis, FAHA FASSA FAAL, professor of constitutional law, Aboriginal Australian activist and international human rights lawyer
- Michael Coper, AO FAAL, founding constitution law professor
- Michael Kirby, AC CMG, visiting professor of constitutional law, former High Court of Australia justice (1999–2009)
- Ronald Sackville, AO FAAL KC, professor of law, dean of Faculty of Law (1979–1981), former judge of the New South Wales Court of Appeal and judge of the Federal Court of Australia

=== School of Law, Society and Criminology ===
- Kyllie Cripps, FAHA, professor of law, specialising in Indigenous family violence
- Lyria Bennett Moses, professor of law, specialising in technology law, Head of School of Law, Society and Criminology (2024–)

=== School of Private and Commercial Law ===
- David Gonski, AC, professor of intellectual property law, chancellor of UNSW (2005–current), businessman
- Ian Ramsay, AO, professor of commercial law, dean of Faculty of Law (1993–1994), researcher in corporate law and securities regulation
- Kim Santow, AO, professor of law, former judge of the Supreme Court of New South Wales
- Margaret Stone, AO FAAL, professor of law, former judge of the Federal Court of Australia, judge of the Supreme Court of the Australian Capital Territory and inspector-general of Intelligence and Security
- Neil Rees, AM, professor of law, researcher in equal opportunity law, employment law and administrative law
- Rosemary Jessamyn Howell, professor of dispute resolution
- Selwyn Selikowitz, visiting professor of commercial law, specialising in contract law, tort, insolvency and equity and trusts, former Cape High Court judge
- Shane Simpson, AM, professor of law, specialising in intellectual property law and entertainment law

== UNSW Faculty of Medicine & Health ==
=== School of Biomedical Sciences ===
- Daniela Stock, FAA, professor of biochemistry, researcher in structural biology and rotary ATPases
- David Cooper, AC FRACP FRCP FAA FAHMS, professor of immunology, researcher in HIV/AIDS
- Elspeth McLachlan, FAA, professor of neurology, researcher in neural pathways within the autonomic nervous system
- Eugenie Lumbers, AM FAA FRSN, conjoint professor of medicine, researcher of the renin–angiotensin system in fetal development and in women's health
- Gilles Guillemin, AM, professor of neuroscience
- Katharina Gaus, immunologist and molecular microscopist
- Kevin Downard, infectious diseases response through mass spectrometry researcher
- Levon Khachigian, vascular cell and molecular biology researcher
- Roland Stocker, professor of biochemistry, researcher in antioxidant activity in bilirubin,

=== School of Clinical Medicine ===
- Alta Schutte, professor of medicine, researcher in hypertension and blood pressure
- Anushka Patel, FRACP, professor of medicine, researcher in improving cardiovascular care in the community
- Bettina Meiser, professor of genetics
- Caroline Ford, professor of medical research, researcher in cancer pathology and personalised medicine, gynecologic cancer
- Cheryl Jones, paediatrician, dean of Faculty of Medicine (2024–)
- Daniel Tarantola, professor of medicine, researcher in HIV/AIDS, especially on social and human rights implications of HIV
- Gavin Andrews, AO, professor of psychiatry, researcher in anxiety disorder
- George Burniston, OBE CMG, senior lecturer in rehabilitation medicine
- Gordian Fulde, AO, associate professor of emergency medicine, founder of Australasian College for Emergency Medicine
- Gordon Parker, AO FASSA, professor of psychiatry, researcher in phenomenology and epidemiology of mood disorders, social psychiatry and the treatment and management of mood disorders
- Kumud Dhital, adjunct associate professor of surgery, specialising in heart and lung transplantation, performed world's first "dead heart" transplant
- James Lance, AO CBE, professor of neurology, researcher in diagnosis in headaches and migraines, founder of the School of Neurology at UNSW
- John Dwyer, AO FRACP, professor of medicine, HIV researcher
- Katherine Samaras, professor of endocrinnology, researcher in obesity
- Ken Hillman, AO, professor of intensive care
- Leslie Lazarus, AO, professor of medicine, endocrinologist, researcher in diabetes and pituitary hormone secretions
- Maree Teesson, AC FASSA, professor of psychiatry, researcher in mental health
- Michelle Haber, AM FAA FAHMS, professor of children's health, researcher in paediatric cancer
- Ned Abraham, professor of surgery
- Nicholas Fisk, AM FAHMS FRSN FRCOG, maternal–fetal medicine specialist
- Nicole Bart, researcher in hypoxia, heart failure and pulmonary hypertension
- Paul Darveniza, professor of neurology and rugby union player for the Wallabies
- Perminder Sachdev, AM FAHMS, professor of neuropsychiatry
- Philip Boyce, AM, professor of psychiatry
- Philip Crowe, FRACS, professor of surgery, surgical oncologist, former first-class cricketer and professional rugby union player
- Philip Hogg, professor of cancer, specialising in cancer treatments
- Ralph Beattie Blacket, AO, founding professor of medicine, researcher in heart disease, cofounder of National Heart Foundation of Australia
- Ralph Mobbs, professor of neurosurgery, specialising in spinal surgery
- Robert M. Graham, AO FAA FAHMS, professor of medicine, cardiologist
- Robert Walsh, AC, professor of medicine, researcher in blood transfusions, dean of Faculty of Medicine (1973–1982)
- Ron Penny, AO FRACP, professor of immunology, researcher in HIV/AIDS
- Valsamma Eapen, professor of psychiatry, researcher in child and adolescent psychiatry
- Vlado Perkovic, renal physician, dean of Faculty of Medicine (2019–2023)

=== School of Optometry & Vision Science ===
- Fred Hollows, professor of ophthalmology, founder of The Fred Hollows Foundation

=== School of Population Health ===
- Don Weatherburn, PSM, professor at National Drug and Alcohol Research Centre, researcher in crime statistics
- Faye McMillan, AM, professor of pharmacy, specialising in rural health and Indigenous healthcare
- Helga Zoega, professor of public health, researcher in pharmacoepidemiology
- Jeffrey Braithwaite, FAHMS FAcSS, professor of health systems
- Lisa Jackson Pulver, AM, professor of Aboriginal Australian health
- Lisa Maher, AM FASSA FAHMS, professor of viral hepatitis epidemiology, researcher in vulnerable persons
- Mary-Louise McLaws, AO, professor of epidemiology, researcher in infectious diseases in Australia including COVID-19, HIV/AIDS and SARS
- Peter Baume, AC, professor of community medicine, former Senator for New South Wales
- Raina MacIntyre, FRACP, professor of global biosecurity, researcher in prevention and control of infectious diseases
- Rebecca Ivers, AM FRSN FAHMS, professor of public health, researcher in injury prevention and trauma care
- Stephen Duckett, AM FASSA FAHMS FAICD, professor of health administration

== UNSW Faculty of Science ==
=== School of Biological, Earth & Environmental Sciences ===
- Andy Pitman, AO FAA, professor of climate change, researcher in land surface processes for climate models
- Chris Turney, FRMetS FRSA FGS FRGS FHEA, professor of climate change and earth sciences, researcher in Sustainable Development Goals, clean technology and climatology
- Darren Curnoe, professor of anthropology, researcher of human evolution in Australasia
- Emma Johnston, AO FAA FTSE FRSN, professor of marine ecology
- Graciela Metternicht, professor of environmental geography, researcher in geospatial technology and their applications in environmental management and policy
- Horace Barber, FAA FRS, professor of botany, researcher in plant cytogenetics
- Katrin Meissner, professor of climate science, oceanographer, specialising in climate models assessing the impact of abrupt climate change
- Laurie Menviel, professor of climate science, researcher in oceancirculation models and their impact in climate change
- Mary MacLean Hindmarsh, professor of botany
- Matthew England, professor of climate science, oceanographer
- Mike Archer, AM FAA FRSN FRZS FACE, professor of paleontology, specialising in Australian vertebrates
- Moninya Roughan, professor of oceanography, researcher of the East Australian Current
- Sarah Pryke, research scientist on gouldian finches
- Suzanne Hand, AO FRSN, professor of paleontology, researcher in vertebrate paleontology, phylogenetics and biogeography
- Tracy Ainsworth, marine biologist and coral reef expert
- Tracey Rogers, professor of marine ecology, researcher of leopard seals

=== School of Biotechnology and Biomolecular Sciences ===
- Belinda Ferrari, professor of environmental microbiology, researcher in Antarctic soil
- Christopher Marquis, professor of biotechnology, researcher in protein biotechnology and in bio-nanotechnology,
- James Lawson, AM, professor of public health, researcher in breast cancer and public health prevention programs
- John Shine, AC FRS FAA, professor of molecular biology, researcher in Protein Synthesis and discovered the Shine–Dalgarno sequence, president of the Australian Academy of Science (2018-2022)
- Katharine Michie, professor of molecular biology and biochemistry, researcher in structural biology and bacterial cell division
- Linda Blackall, FAA, professor of microbiology
- Marc Wilkins, professor of systems biology, researcher of proteome
- Merlin Crossley, AM, professor of molecular biology, researcher in CRISPR gene editing and gene regulation
- Pamela Rickard, professor of biotechnology, researcher in yeast biochemistry and enzyme technology, first female professor in science at UNSW
- Peter Gray, AO, professor of biotechnology, researcher in industrial biotechnology

=== School of Chemistry ===
- Albert Ernest Alexander, professor of chemistry, research in colloids, head of School of Chemistry (1952–1956)
- Brian Orr, FRACI, professor of chemistry, researcher in experimental and theoretical topics in molecular and optical physics
- David Paver Mellor, professor of inorganic chemistry, head of School of Chemistry (1956–1968)
- Edward Rennie, inaugural chemistry lecturer
- Francis Patrick Dwyer, FAA, chemist, Head Teacher of Inorganic Chemistry
- Fraser Stoddart, professor of chemistry, 2016 Nobel Prize in Chemistry
- Gordon Aylward, professor of chemistry, author of SI Chemical Data
- Margaret Harding, professor of chemistry, researcher in antifreeze proteins and ligand-DNA
- Martina Stenzel, FAA, professor of chemistry, researcher in polymer synthesis and applications of polymers in medicine
- Raymond Martin, AO FAA FTSE FRACI, professor of chemistry
- Ronald Sydney Nyholm, professor of chemistry
- Rupert Myers, foundation professor of metallurgy, vice-chancellor of UNSW (1969–1981)

=== School of Materials Science ===
- Veena Sahajwalla, FAA FTSE, professor of materials science, researcher in metallurgy, green steel and innovating micro-factories

=== School of Mathematics & Statistics ===
- Alfred van der Poorten, AM, number theory professor, researcher in Baker's theorem, continued fractions, elliptic curves, regular languages and transcendental numbers
- Astrid an Huef, pure mathematics professor, researcher in operator algebra
- Catherine Greenhill, FAA FRSN, professor of combinatorics, researcher in random graphs, enumerative combinatorics and markov chain
- Derek William Robinson, FAA, professor of pure mathematics, head of School of Mathematics and Statistics (1980–1981)
- Estate Khmaladze, statistician, known for Khmaladze transformation
- Frances Kuo, applied mathematics professor, researcher in low-discrepancy sequences and quasi-Monte Carlo methods for mumerical integration and finite element analysis
- Gareth W. Peters, statistics professor, researcher of actuarial science and bayesian inference
- Gavin Brown, AO FAA, pure mathematics professor, head of School of Mathematics and Statistics (1981–1985)
- George Szekeres, AM FAA, professor of pure mathematics, known for szekeres snark, Kruskal–Szekeres coordinates, Erdős–Szemerédi theorem and the Happy ending problem
- Ian Sloan, AO FAA FRSN, applied mathematics professor, researcher in numerical analysis, head of School of Mathematics and Statistics (1986–1990 and 1992–1993)
- Inge Koch, statistics professor, researcher in multivariate statistics and image analysis
- James Franklin, professor of philosophy of mathematics, researcher in extreme risk theory, ethics and history of ideas
- John M. Blatt, applied mathematics professor, theoretical physicist, head of School of Mathematics and Statistics (1963–1964)
- Lynne Billard, statistics professor
- Max Kelly, pure mathematics professor, researcher in enriched category theory
- Michael Barber, AO FAA, statistical mechanics researcher
- Michael Cowling, pure mathematics professor, researcher in harmonic analysis, representation theory, partial differential equations and lie groups, head of School of Mathematics and Statistics (2002–2007)
- Michael Hasofer, statistics professor, head of School of Mathematics and Statistics (1971–1972 and 1974–1976)
- Murray Aitkin, professor of statistics
- Nalini Joshi, AO, applied mathematics professor, researcher in integrable systems
- Susan Wilson, statistics professor, researcher in biostatistics, especially on AIDS in Australia
- Trevor McDougall, AC FRS FAA FInstP FRSN, oceanography professor, research in physical oceanography and how seawater mixes under different conditions

=== School of Physics ===
- Alexander Hamilton, physics professor researcher in condensed matter physics and quantum computing
- Gerasimos Danilatos, project scientist and professional officer at UNSW, physicist and inventor of the environmental scanning electron microscope
- Heinrich Hora, theoretical physicist
- James Scott, FRS, physics professor, pioneer of ferroelectric memory devices, researcher in ferroics
- Michael Ashley, astronomy and astrophysics professor, researcher in Dome C seeing
- Michael G. Burton, FRSN astronomy professor
- Michelle Simmons, AO FRS FAA FRSN FTSE, professor of quantum physics, researcher in atomic electronics
- Sadhan Kumar Adhikari, nuclear and atomic physicist
- Susan Coppersmith, FRSN FAA, physics professor, researcher in condensed matter physics

=== School of Psychology ===
- Barbara Gillam, FRSN FASSA, professor of psychology, researcher in stereoscopic vision
- Eddie Harmon-Jones, professor of psychology, researcher in motivation and emotion
- Kaarin Anstey, FASSA FAHMS FRSN, dementia researcher
- Richard Bryant, AC FAA, professor of psychology, researcher in post-traumatic stress disorder and prolonged grief disorder

== UNSW Canberra ==
- Anthony Burke, professor of environmental politics and international relations
- Brian Lees, professor of geography
- Clinton Fernandes, professor of international relations and political studies, national security academic
- Colin Pask, applied mathematics professor, researcher in nuclear physics, Optical Physics and biological vision
- Craig Stockings, professor of history and strategic studies, researcher in Australian military history
- David Stahel, professor of history, specialising in German military history of World War II
- Elanor Huntington, FTSE, professor of quantum cybernetics, researcher in quantum optics
- Geoff Wilson, AM, nuclear physics professor, researcher in nuclear magnetic resonance spectroscopy and low temperature physics
- James Goldrick, AO CSC, adjunct professor of Australian naval history, former senior officer of the Royal Australian Navy
- Jeffrey Grey, professor of military history, specialising in the Korean War and the Vietnam War
- Jill Slay AM, digital forensics and cybersecurity expert
- Peter Stanley, FAHA, professor of history, specialising in Australian military history and British medical history
- Sean Cadogan, physics professor, researcher in magnetism and crystallography of rare-earth elements
- Shirley Scott, professor of international law and international relations, researcher in international law on climate change
- Wolfgang Kasper, economics professor, researcher in institutional economics
- Xiuping Jia, electrical engineering professor, researcher in photogrammetry, remote sensing and image processing

== Administration ==
=== Chancellors ===
- Wallace Wurth 1949–1960
- The Hon. Sir John Clancy 1960–1970
- Sir Robert Webster 1970–1975
- The Hon. Gordon Samuels 1976–1994
- The Hon. Sir Anthony Mason 1994–1999
- John Yu 2000–2005
- David Gonski 2005–present

=== Vice chancellors ===
- Arthur Denning 1949–1952
- Sir Philip Baxter 1953–1969
- Sir Rupert Myers 1969–1981
- L. Michael Birt 1981–1992
- John Niland 1992–2002
- Wyatt "Rory" Hume 2002–2004
- Mark Wainwright 2004–2006
- Fred Hilmer 2006–2015
- Ian Jacobs 2015–2022
- Attila Brungs 2022–present

=== UNSW Canberra ===
UNSW Canberra is a campus of the UNSW and is located at the Australian Defence Force Academy. Since 1967 the university has been providing tertiary education to officers in the Australian Defence Force through the Royal Military College, Duntroon. In 1986 the Australian Defence Force Academy, a tri-service military training institution, was established. The academy is run jointly by the commandant, who represents the Australian Defence Force side, and the rector, who represents the UNSW.

==== Deans and rectors ====
Dean	Term
E. R. Bryan (acting dean)	1967
Sir Leslie H. Martin	1967–1970
B. D. Beddie	1971–1972
J. C. Burns	1973–1978
T. G. Chapman (acting dean)	1975, 1978, 1980
Geoff Wilson	1978–1986

Past and present rectors

Rector	Term
Geoff Wilson	1984–1991
Harry Heseltine AO	1991–1996
John Richards FTSE	1996–1998
Peter Hall (acting rector)	1998–1999
Robert King	1999–2004
David Lovell (acting rector)	2004
John Baird	2004–2010
Michael Frater	2011–present

== See also ==
- List of University of New South Wales alumni
