= John Piggott =

John Piggott may refer to:

- John Piggott (economist), Australian economist
- John Piggott (politician) (1879–1957), Australian politician

== See also ==
- John Pigott (1550 – by 1627), English politician
- John Edward Pigot (1822–1871), Irish music collector and lawyer
