= Karen Casey (artist) =

Australian painter, printmaker, and new media artist (1956–2021)

- Born: 7 January 1956; Hobart, Tasmania
- Died: 15 October 2021 (aged 65); Melbourne, Victoria, Australia
- Known for: Printmaking, new media art
- Awards: National New Media Art Award (2012)
- Website: karencasey.com

Karen Casey (7 January 1956 – 15 October 2021) was an Australian interdisciplinary artist of the Palawa people, Australia. She was Melbourne's Artist in Residence in 2003.

== Early life and education ==
Casey was born in Hobart, Tasmania.

Casey attended art school at the Tasmanian College of Advanced Education where she studied silversmithing. Following school she moved to Melbourne to work as a graphic designer.

== Career ==
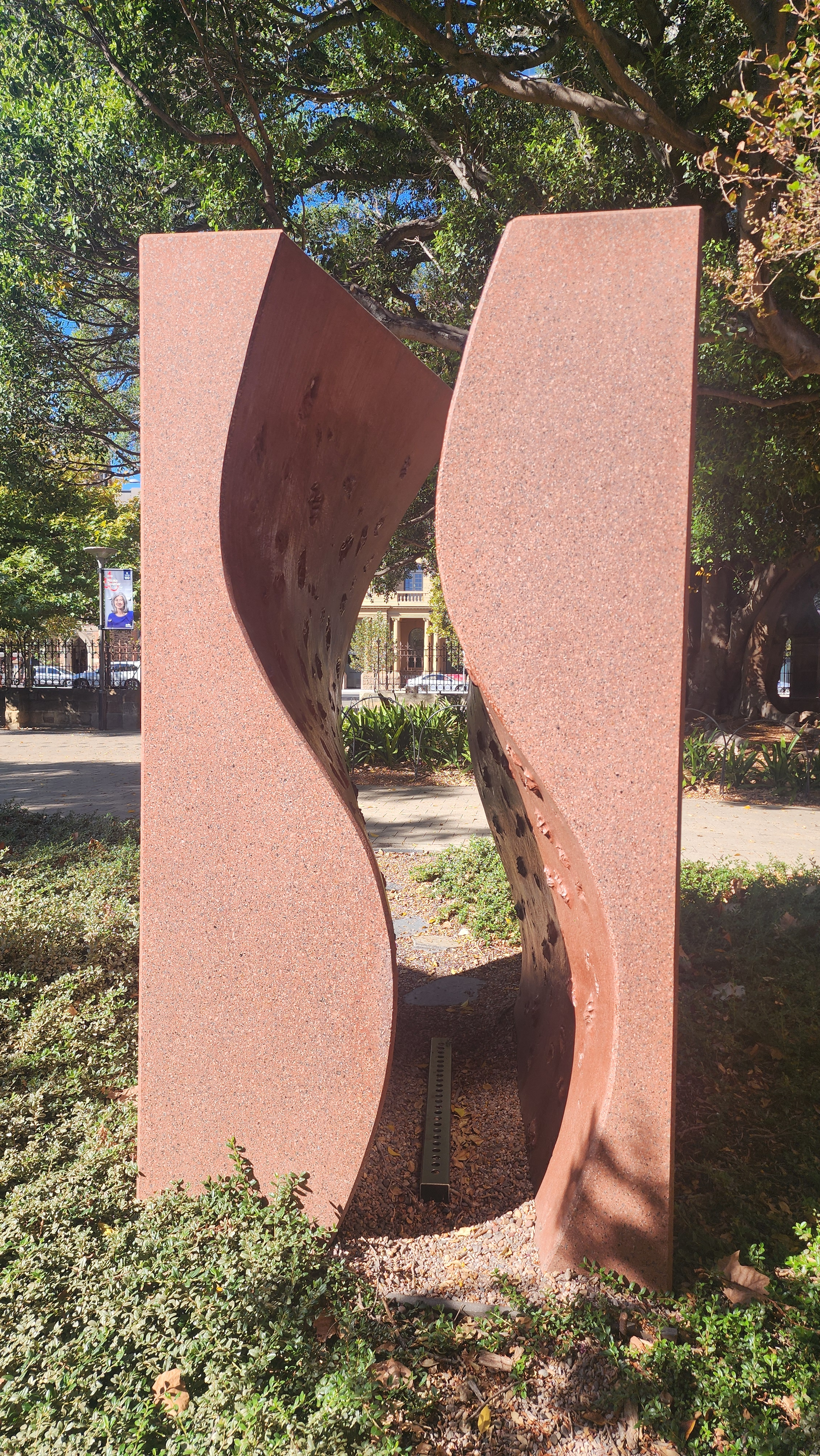
Reconciliation Touchstone by Karen Casey and Darryl Cowie in North Terrace, Adelaide

Casey began exhibiting her artwork in the late 1980s, and worked for over three decades in a diverse range of media, from painting and printmaking to installation, video, performance and public art. Her work investigated the "experiential and philosophical understanding of the interrelationships between various cultural and spiritual traditions and aspects of contemporary western science." Casey was interested in metaphysics, consciousness and interconnection, and these influenced her work. Her piece Got the Bastard provided new insight into the life of Aboriginal women. In 1987, she took part in "Aboriginal Australians in Print and Poster", co-curated by an Aboriginal and non Aboriginal person.

A collaborative work with Damian Smith, called Bruny, won the Art of Place Reconciliation Award in the Fifth National Indigenous Heritage Art Awards in 2000, and was exhibited in the accompanying Art of Place exhibition.

In 2006, she collaborated with Darryl Cowie on the Reconciliation Touchstone sculpture that incorporated the imprints of 64 handshakes.

In 2012, Casey received the National New Media Art Award, the most significant award in Australia for new media art.

In 2021, Casey submitted two pieces to RMIT Gallery's Future U project. Using MRI and CT scans of her own liver, she created an animated film called Transplanted, a piece that was described as "remarkable" by art critic Barnaby Smith. She also submitted a duratran print entitled Transmutation included a CT scan of her own head.

== Collections ==
Casey's work is included in the collections of the Art Gallery of New South Wales, National Gallery of Victoria, Gallery of Modern Art (QAGOMA), the British Museum, and the Seattle Art Museum.

== Personal life ==
Casey received a liver transplant at the Austin hospital.
