= Zhang Wenjie =

Zhang Wenjie may refer to:

- Wenjie Zhang, Australian computer scientist
- Zhang Wenjie (politician), Singaporean politician
