= Lemm =

Lemm is a surname. Notable people with the surname include:

- Heinz-Georg Lemm (1919–1994), German soldier
- Oscar Lemm (1856–1918), Russian Egyptologist and Coptologist
- Romano Lemm (born 1984), Swiss ice hockey player
- Vanessa Lemm, Australian philosopher and academic
- Wally Lemm (1919–1988), American football coach
