= Eggins =

Eggins is an Australian surname. Notable people with the surname include:

- Jim Eggins (1898–1952), Australian politician
- Suzanne Eggins, Australian linguist

== See also ==
- Eggink
