= Eggink =

Eggink is a surname. Notable people with the surname include:

- Gertie Eggink (born 1980), Dutch sidecarcross rider
- Herman Eggink (born 1949), Dutch rower
- Stephanie Eggink (born 1988), American mixed martial artist

== See also ==
- Eggins
