= Margaret Harding =

Australian scientist

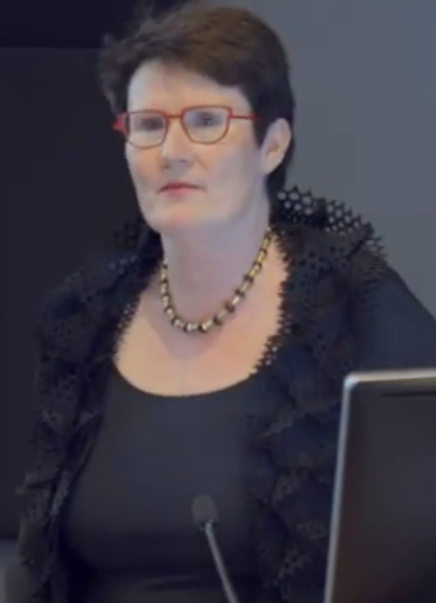
- At an ANU event in 2018
- Born: 14 December 1960 (age 65); Sydney, Australia
- Education: University of Sydney
- Occupations: Chemist, educator

Margaret Harding (born 14 December 1960) is an Australian chemist and educator who is currently Deputy Vice-Chancellor (Research) at the Australian National University (ANU). She is an expert in medicinal and biomolecular chemistry, with special research interests in the areas of antifreeze proteins and ligand-DNA interactions.

== Education ==
Born 14 December 1960 in Sydney, Harding completed her undergraduate studies at the University of Sydney in 1982. She received a PhD in 1986 under M. J. Crossley and S. Sternhell, with a thesis titled A Study of Tautomerism and Atropisomerism in 5,10,15,20-Tetra-Arylporphyrins, and a DSc in 2002, also from the University of Sydney. On completing her PhD, Harding held postdoctoral positions at the Université Louis Pasteur in Strasbourg, France and the University of Cambridge in the United Kingdom.

== Academic positions ==
In 1990, Harding returned to the University of Sydney, where she taught as a professor of chemistry until 2005.

In 2005, Harding was appointed the first Dean of Graduate Research at the University of New South Wales (UNSW), a position she held until 2009. In 2008, she was appointed Pro Vice-Chancellor (Research) at UNSW.

In June 2012, Harding became Deputy Vice-Chancellor (Research) at ANU.

Harding is a Director on the Boards of ANU Enterprise, Australian Scientific Instruments, National Computational Infrastructure National Facility (Australia) and an alternate Director on the Board of ANU Connect Ventures. She has been a director on the Boards of the UNSW Foundation and Neuroscience Research Australia, and an alternate Director on the Board of Bionic Vision Australia.

Harding has been a member of the Australian Research Council (ARC) College of Experts and has served as Chair of the ARC International Linkage and ARC Scrutiny Committees

== Publications and awards ==
Harding has published over 110 research articles. She has served on the editorial boards of Medicinal Chemistry and Mini-Reviews in Medicinal Chemistry. She received the Royal Australian Chemical Institute (RACI) Rennie (1993) and Biota (1995) medals, and was an invited speaker for the RACI Nyholm Youth lecture series in 1999.
