= Guan Heng Yeoh =

Australian nuclear scientist

- Yeoh in 2025
- Education: University of New South Wales
- Scientific career
- Fields: Materials science
- Workplaces: University of New South Wales

Guan Heng Yeoh is an Australian nuclear scientist, mechanical engineer and academic. He is a professor in the School of Mechanical and Manufacturing Engineering at the University of New South Wales (UNSW), and serves as Director of both the Australian Research Council (ARC) Training Centre for Fire Retardant Materials and Safety Technologies and the ARC Research Hub for Fire Resilience Infrastructure, Assets and Safety Advancements. He is known for his research and work to fire safety engineering, materials science, and the development of fire protection technologies.

He received the 2024 Australian Financial Review Research Commercialisation Award, the Brennan Medal from the Institution of Chemical Engineers (IChemE) in 2009 for an outstanding book publication and a NASA award in 1992 for research on solidification in microgravity.

== Early life and education ==
Yeoh earned a Bachelor of Engineering with First Class Honours in Mechanical Engineering from the University of New South Wales in 1988. He completed his Doctor of Philosophy in Mechanical Engineering, specializing in computational fluid dynamics, at the same institution in 1993.

== Career ==
His career began with postdoctoral and research scientist roles at the Commonwealth Scientific and Industrial Research Organisation (CSIRO) between 1993 and 1998, followed by senior research leadership positions at ANSTO from 1999 to 2013.

He served as associate professor at UNSW from 2009 to 2015 before being promoted to Professor in 2016. He is currently a professor in the School of Mechanical and Manufacturing Engineering at the University of New South Wales (UNSW), Sydney, and Principal Research Scientist as well as Leader of the Thermal-Hydraulics Group at the Australian Nuclear Science and Technology Organisation (ANSTO).

He also holds adjunct professorships at Zhejiang University, China, and Edith Cowan University, Perth.

Yeoh has made contributions in areas such as nuclear reactor design, fire retardant materials, and computational multiphase flow modeling. He directed the Australian Research Council (ARC) Training Centre in Fire Retardant Materials and Safety Technologies and served on expert panels addressing fire-proof building design, fire investigation, and safety standards.

His expertise has been sought as an expert witness in international patent cases and in major fire investigations, including the Quakers Hill nursing home fire and the Bankstown apartment fire. He has participated in International Atomic Energy Agency (IAEA) coordinated research projects, contributed to the design and commissioning of the Open Pool Australian Lightwater (OPAL) research reactor, and been active in national engineering education benchmarking initiatives.

In academic publishing, Yeoh is the founder and editor of the Journal of Computational Multiphase Flows and serves in editorial roles for several international journals, including the Australian Journal of Mechanical Engineering, Applied Sciences, and Experimental and Computational Multiphase Flow.

He has also edited major reference works, such as the Handbook of Multiphase Flow Science and Technology. His editorial and scholarly work spans interdisciplinary engineering, computational modeling, and applied fire safety research, reinforcing his position as a leading figure in both academic and applied engineering fields.

== Research ==
Yeoh leads an industry-focused fire safety research, spanning materials science, engineering, and applied technologies. His work includes the development of advanced carbon materials and durable, green polymer composites for fire-resistant applications, next-generation fire suppression systems, responsive sensing technology, early detection systems, and novel flammability testing methods.

Guan Heng Yeoh co-developed FSA FIRECOAT, a fire-retardant paint created through collaboration with Flame Security International. Designed to defend structures against direct flame exposure and extreme heat, the coating forms an insulating char layer that significantly mitigates bushfire damage. It has met the stringent BAL-40 standard for bushfire attack, his innovation has known for its practical and protective role in bushfire-prone regions.

Yeoh and his research team have pioneered the use of MXenes, two-dimensional transition metal carbide, carbon nitride, and nitride nanosheets as advanced fire-retardant materials. Employing ANSTO's small-angle neutron scattering (SANS) instrumentation and complementary theoretical models, they characterized MXene's ultrathin layered structure (approximately 3 nm thick). Their findings highlight that incorporating MXenes at just 1–5% by weight can produce substantial fire-retardant effects—offering significant weight reduction compared to traditional carbon-heavy alternatives.

In a fusion of energy and safety technologies, Yeoh contributes to the development of Solar Skin, a multifunctional polymer membrane that integrates perovskite (and perovskite–silicon tandem) solar cells with flame-retardant properties. His project has been Supported by a $3 million CRC–P grant and in-kind industry contributions.

== Awards ==
- KCA Australasian Research Commercialisation Awards (2024), Best Industry Research Collaboration (winner)
- Australian Financial Review Award (2024), Research Commercialisation (joint winner)
- Shaping Australia Awards (2023), Problem Solver Award – People's Choice (winner)
- Brennan Medal (2009), best book publication, Institute of Chemical Engineers (IChemE)
- NASA Award (1992), novel research in solidification in microgravity
- Australian entrant for the CAETS Communication Prize (2023) for FSA FIRECOAT

== Selected publications ==
=== Books and edited volumes ===
- Tu, Jiyuan; Yeoh, Guan-Heng; Liu, Chaoqun (2013), "Practical Guidelines for CFD Simulation and Analysis", Computational Fluid Dynamics, Elsevier, pp. 219–273, doi:10.1016/b978-0-08-098243-4.00006-8, ISBN 978-0-08-098243-4
- Tu, Jiyuan; Yeoh, Guan Heng; Liu, Chaoqun (2013). Computational fluid dynamics: a practical approach (2nd ed.). Amsterdam: Elsevier/BH. ISBN 978-0-08-098243-4.
- Yeoh, Guan Heng; Yuen, Kwok Kit, eds. (2009). Computational fluid dynamics in fire engineering: theory, modelling and practice. Burlington, MA Singapore: Butterworth-Heinemann. ISBN 978-0-08-057003-7.
- Yeoh, Guan Heng; Cheung, Chi Pok; Tu, Jiyuan (2014). Multiphase flow analysis using population balance modeling: bubbles, drops and particles. IChemE. Heidelberg: Butterworth-Heinemann. ISBN 978-0-08-098233-5.

=== Book chapters ===
- Yeoh, Guan Heng; Cheung, Chi Pok; Tu, Jiyuan (2014), "Preface", Multiphase Flow Analysis Using Population Balance Modeling, Elsevier, pp. ix, doi:10.1016/b978-0-08-098229-8.05001-4, ISBN 978-0-08-098229-8
- Yeoh, Guan Heng; Cheung, Chi Pok; Tu, Jiyuan (2014), "Population Balance Approach—A Generic Framework", Multiphase Flow Analysis Using Population Balance Modeling, Elsevier, pp. 69–90, doi:10.1016/b978-0-08-098229-8.00003-6, ISBN 978-0-08-098229-8
- Yeoh, Guan Heng; Cheung, Chi Pok; Tu, Jiyuan (2014), "Mechanistic Models for Gas–Particle Liquid–Particle Flows", Multiphase Flow Analysis Using Population Balance Modeling, Elsevier, pp. 137–168, doi:10.1016/b978-0-08-098229-8.00005-x, ISBN 978-0-08-098229-8
- Yeoh, Guan Heng; Cheung, Chi Pok; Tu, Jiyuan (2014), "Solution Methods and Turbulence Modeling", Multiphase Flow Analysis Using Population Balance Modeling, Elsevier, pp. 169–261, doi:10.1016/b978-0-08-098229-8.00006-1, ISBN 978-0-08-098229-8
- Yeoh, Guan Heng; Tu, Jiyuan (2010), "Free Surface Flows", Computational Techniques for Multiphase Flows, Elsevier, pp. 457–500, doi:10.1016/b978-0-08-046733-7.00007-2, ISBN 978-0-08-046733-7
- Yeoh, Guan Heng; Tu, Jiyuan (2010), "Freezing/Solidification", Computational Techniques for Multiphase Flows, Elsevier, pp. 501–539, doi:10.1016/b978-0-08-046733-7.00008-4, ISBN 978-0-08-046733-7

=== Journals ===
- Tian, Z. F.; Tu, J. Y.; Yeoh, G. H.; Yuen, R. K. K. (2007-10-01). "Numerical studies of indoor airflow and particle dispersion by large Eddy simulation". Building and Environment. 42 (10): 3483–3492. Bibcode:2007BuEnv..42.3483T. doi:10.1016/j.buildenv.2006.10.047. ISSN 0360-1323.
- Stepanyants, Yury A.; Yeoh, Guan H. (2008). "Stationary bathtub vortices and a critical regime of liquid discharge". Journal of Fluid Mechanics. 604: 77–98. Bibcode:2008JFM...604...77S. doi:10.1017/S0022112008001080. ISSN 1469-7645.
- Yang, Wei; Tawiah, Benjamin; Yu, Chao; Qian, Yi-Fan; Wang, Li-Li; Yuen, Anthony Chun-Yin; Zhu, San-E; Hu, En-Zhu; Chen, Timothy Bo-Yuan; Yu, Bin; Lu, Hong-Dian; Yeoh, Guan Heng; Wang, Xin; Song, Lei; Hu, Yuan (2018-07-01). "Manufacturing, mechanical and flame retardant properties of poly(lactic acid) biocomposites based on calcium magnesium phytate and carbon nanotubes". Composites Part A: Applied Science and Manufacturing. 110: 227–236. doi:10.1016/j.compositesa.2018.04.027. hdl:1959.4/unsworks_55939. ISSN 1359-835X.
- Shemesh, Jonathan; Jalilian, Iman; Shi, Anthony; Yeoh, Guan Heng; Tate, Melissa L. Knothe; Warkiani, Majid Ebrahimi (2015-10-13). "Flow-induced stress on adherent cells in microfluidic devices". Lab on a Chip. 15 (21): 4114–4127. doi:10.1039/C5LC00633C. ISSN 1473-0189. PMID 26334370.
- Wang, Wei; Yuen, Anthony Chun Yin; Long, Hu; Yang, Wei; Li, Ao; Song, Lei; Hu, Yuan; Yeoh, Guan Heng (2021-11-01). "Random nano-structuring of PVA/MXene membranes for outstanding flammability resistance and electromagnetic interference shielding performances". Composites Part B: Engineering. 224 109174. doi:10.1016/j.compositesb.2021.109174. ISSN 1359-8368.
- Ming, C.; Rizwanul Fattah, I. M.; Chan, Qing N.; Pham, Phuong X.; Medwell, Paul R.; Kook, Sanghoon; Yeoh, Guan H.; Hawkes, Evatt R.; Masri, Assaad R. (2018-07-15). "Combustion characterization of waste cooking oil and canola oil based biodiesels under simulated engine conditions". Fuel. 224: 167–177. Bibcode:2018Fuel..224..167M. doi:10.1016/j.fuel.2018.03.053. hdl:1959.4/unsworks_50388. ISSN 0016-2361.
- Yuen, Anthony Chun Yin; Chen, Timothy Bo Yuan; Li, Ao; De Cachinho Cordeiro, Ivan Miguel; Liu, Luzhe; Liu, Hengrui; Lo, Anson Lok Pui; Chan, Qing Nian; Yeoh, Guan Heng (2021). "Evaluating the fire risk associated with cladding panels: An overview of fire incidents, policies, and future perspective in fire standards". Fire and Materials. 45 (5): 663–689. doi:10.1002/fam.2973. hdl:1959.4/unsworks_75047. ISSN 1099-1018.
- Soh, Gim Yau; Yeoh, Guan Heng; Timchenko, Victoria (2016-09-01). "An algorithm to calculate interfacial area for multiphase mass transfer through the volume-of-fluid method". International Journal of Heat and Mass Transfer. 100: 573–581. Bibcode:2016IJHMT.100..573S. doi:10.1016/j.ijheatmasstransfer.2016.05.006. ISSN 0017-9310.
- Wang, Zhe; Zhou, Yang; Liu, Jiaxin; Ma, Bingyang; Chi, Won Seok; Yeoh, Guan Heng; Liao, Guanglan; Shi, Tielin; Long, Hu (2025). "LEGO-inspired fabrication strategy for aramid nanofibers-based multilayer aerogels with tunable multiple functions". Composites Science and Technology. 261 111029. doi:10.1016/j.compscitech.2024.111029.
- Zhang, Jiemin; Yeoh, Guan Heng; Kabir, Imrana I. (2025-02-05). "Polyurethane Materials for Fire Retardancy: Synthesis, Structure, Properties, and Applications". Fire. 8 (2): 64. Bibcode:2025Fire....8...64Z. doi:10.3390/fire8020064. ISSN 2571-6255.
- Lei, Yu; Chan, Qing Nian; Xu, Lulu; Lee, Eric Wai Ming; Lee, Yuan Xien; Agarwal, Vipul; Yeoh, Guan Heng; Wang, Wei (2025). "Smart retardant materials for fire alarm systems: integrating flame retardancy and early detection technologies". Advanced Composites and Hybrid Materials. 8 (1) 112. doi:10.1007/s42114-024-01152-6. ISSN 2522-0128.
- Chen, Q.; De Cachinho Cordeiro, I.M.; Yang, W.; Yuen, A.C.Y.; Chen, T.B.Y.; Wang, W.; Yang, W.; Yeoh, G.H.; Yuen, R.K.K. (2025). "Exploring graphdiyne - Dynamic characterisation of the surface oxidation mechanisms via ReaxFF-MD and experiments". Carbon. 232 119793. Bibcode:2025Carbo.23219793C. doi:10.1016/j.carbon.2024.119793.
- Li, Qianlong; Lei, Yu; Bi, Xue; Liu, Yina; Pan, Ye-Tang; Wang, Wei; Zhang, Wenchao; Shi, Congling; Yeoh, Guan Heng (2025). "Inspired by the tessellation of strawberry achenes on skin: Preparation of ZIF-67 derived multifunctional flame retardant through supramolecular assembly of cobalt alginate biopolymer in melamine-containing polyphosphazene skeleton". Chemical Engineering Journal. 506 160242. Bibcode:2025ChEnJ.50660242L. doi:10.1016/j.cej.2025.160242.
