= National New Media Art Award =

Australian art award

The Premier of Queensland's National New Media Art Award is a biennial, invitational Australian art award for works of new media art, instituted in 2008 under the auspices of the Queensland Government and the Queensland Gallery of Modern Art at the Queensland Art Gallery. The award is worth A$75,000 and is acquisitive. The National New Media Art Award also includes a tandem scholarship valued at A$25,000 for an emerging Queensland artist.

Nine artists or collaborations were shortlisted for the 2008 award, and seven for the 2010 award. The inaugural winner of the award was Peter Alwast and of the scholarship was Leah Barclay, as announced by the Premier of Queensland, Anna Bligh, on 31 October 2008. The outcome of the 2010 competition was announced on 27 August 2010.

== Winners ==
- 2012 (award) - George Poonkhin Khut, Distillery: Waveforming (2012)
- 2010 (award) - Isobel Knowles and Van Sowerwine, You Were in My Dream (2010)
- 2010 (scholarship) - TBA
- 2008 (inaugural award) - Peter Alwast, Everything (2008)
- 2008 (inaugural scholarship) - Leah Barclay
