= Kaarin Anstey =

Australian dementia scientist

Kaarin J. Anstey FASSA FAHMS FRSN
- Education: University of Queensland (PhD); University of Sydney
- Awards: Australian Laureate Fellowship (2019); Fellow of the Gerontological Society of America (2014)
- Scientific career
- Fields: Psychology, Cognitive Ageing, Midlife Cognition, Wellbeing, Longitudinal Studies
- Workplaces: UNSW Sydney, CEPAR (2018–present)

Kaarin Anstey is an Australian Laureate Fellow and one of Australia's top dementia scientists. She is Co-Deputy Director of the ARC Centre of Excellence in Population Ageing Research (CEPAR) at the University of New South Wales, Australia, where she is Scientia Professor of Psychology. Kaarin Anstey is an Honorary Professor at the Australian National University and a Fellow of the Academy of the Social Sciences in Australia. She is a Director of the NHMRC Dementia Centre for Research Collaboration, Senior Principal Research Scientist at NeuRA and leads the NHMRC Centre of Research Excellence in Cognitive Health and the UNSW Ageing Futures Institute.

== Education and career ==
Anstey graduated with a PhD in Psychology from the University of Queensland.

She is the Co-Deputy Director of the ARC Centre of Excellence in Population Ageing Research (CEPAR) at the University of New South Wales, where she is Scientia Professor of Psychology.

From 2012 to 2017 she was the founding Director of the Centre for Research on Ageing, Health and Wellbeing at the Australian National University, where she is now an Honorary Professor. She is Senior Principal Research Scientist at NeuRA and a Director of the NHMRC Dementia Centre for Research Collaboration. She leads the NHMRC Centre of Research Excellence in Cognitive Health and the UNSW Ageing Futures Institute. From 2017 to 2024, Anstey was Deputy Director of the ARC Centre of Excellence in Population Ageing Research.

Anstey is the Chair of the International Research Network on Dementia Prevention, a Director of the Board of the Dementia Australia Research Foundation, a member of the World Health Organisation Guideline Development Group cognitive decline and dementia, and a member of the Governance Committee of the Global Council on Brain Health, an initiative supported by the American Association of Retired Persons and AgeUK.

== Research contributions ==
Anstey's research programs focus on the causes, consequences and prevention of cognitive decline and dementia over the adult life-course. She also conducts research into mental health and resilience, and evaluates interventions to promote mobility and health ageing. She has worked extensively with longitudinal studies, and leads the Personality & Total Health (PATH) Through Life Project, a large cohort study focussing on common mental disorders and cognitive function, based in the Australian Capital Territory and surrounding regions. She also conducts research into driving and road safety in later life.

== Publications ==
Anstey is contributed to many academic publications, such as book chapters, journal articles, working papers, etc. The following publication list is some of her newest publications.

- Anstey KJ, 2025, 'A holistic adaptive ageing framework (HAAF) to address complex challenges in ageing', Zeitschrift Fur Gerontologie Und Geriatrie, 58, pp. 390 - 396, http://dx.doi.org/10.1007/s00391-025-02467-9.
- Brady B; Zhou S; Ashworth D; Zheng L; Eramudugolla R; Anstey KJ, 2025, 'Feasibility, adherence and usability of an observational digital health study built using Apple’s ResearchKit among adults aged 18–84 years', Frontiers in Digital Health, 7, http://dx.doi.org/10.3389/fdgth.2025.1520971.
- Brodaty H; Chau T; Heffernan M; Ginige JA; Andrews G; Millard M; Sachdev PS; Anstey KJ; Lautenschlager NT; McNeil JJ; Jorm L; Kochan NA; Maeder A; Welberry H; San Jose JC; Briggs NE; Popovic G; Mavros Y; Almendrales Rangel C; Noble Y; Radd-Vagenas S; Flood VM; O’Leary F; Lampit A; Walton CC; Barr P; Fiatarone Singh M; Valenzuela M, 2025, 'An online multidomain lifestyle intervention to prevent cognitive decline in at-risk older adults: a randomized controlled trial', Nature Medicine, 31, pp. 565 - 573, http://dx.doi.org/10.1038/s41591-024-03351-6.
- Cerin E; Matison AP; Molina MA; Schroers RD; Li W; Knibbs LD; Catts VS; Wu YT; Soloveva MV; Anstey KJ; Mavoa S; Poudel G; Jalaludin B; Kochan NA; Brodaty H; Sachdev PS, 2025, 'Neighborhood environments and transition to cognitive states: Sydney Memory and Ageing Study', Alzheimer S and Dementia, 21, http://dx.doi.org/10.1002/alz.70569.
- Cerin E; Soloveva MV; Molina MA; Schroers RD; Wu YT; Sachdev PS; Knibbs LD; Cherbuin N; Jalaludin B; Mavoa S; Anstey KJ, 2025, 'Do associations of neighbourhood attributes with cognitive function vary by socio-economic status? A 12-year follow-up study of older Australians', Science of the Total Environment, 999, http://dx.doi.org/10.1016/j.scitotenv.2025.180354.
- Fancello G; Chaix B; Molina MA; Stickland N; Barnett A; Lautenschlager NT; Anstey KJ; Cerin E, 2025, 'Urban environment and complexity of walking routes in mid-aged and older adults: the moderating effects of cognitive abilities', Journal of Environmental Psychology, 105, http://dx.doi.org/10.1016/j.jenvp.2025.102660.

All of her publications throughout her career is written here: https://www.unsw.edu.au/staff/kaarin-anstey

== Awards and honours ==
Anstey is an Australian Laureate Fellow, a Fellow of the Academy of the Social Sciences in Australia, a Fellow of the Australian Association of Gerontology, a Fellow of the Australian Psychological Society, a Fellow of the Royal Society of New South Wales and a Fellow of the Australian Academy of Health and Medical Sciences.

- Senior Mental Health and Prevention Research Award (2025)
- Royal Society of New South Wales (RSNSW) Award in Social and Behavioural Sciences (2023)
- Australian Laureate Fellowship - Australian Research Council (2019)
- APS Distinguished Contribution to Psychological Science Award (2018)
- Fellow of the Gerontological Society of America (2014)
- Exceptional Contribution Award – Journals of Gerontology Psychological Science (2009)
- E.W. Busse Award for Research Excellence in the Social and Behavioral Sciences from the International Association of Gerontology and Geriatrics (2009)
- Distinguished Contribution Award from the Australian Association of Gerontology, ACT Division (2007)
- Margret M. and Paul B. Baltes Foundation Award in Social and Behavioural Sciences from the Gerontological Society of America (2005), an international award for research excellence in social and behavioural gerontology
- Australian Psychological Society Early Career Award (2002)
- Academy of the Social Sciences in Australia Early Career Award (2001)
- Organon Award from the Australasian Society for Psychiatric Research (2000) (for a mental health researcher under the age of 35)
- Chinoin Young Investigator Award from the International Association of Gerontology (1997)
- University of Queensland Travelling Scholarship (1994)
- The Inaugural Elsie Harwood Award (1992)
- The Dick Thomson Prize, University of Sydney (1991)
- The Australian Psychological Society Prize (1991)
