= Australian Journal of Management =

- Discipline: Management
- Language: English
- Edited by: Andrew Jackson

Publication details
- History: 1976-present
- Publisher: SAGE Publications
- Frequency: Quarterly
- Impact factor: 4.8 (2022)

Standard abbreviations
- ISO 4: Aust. J. Manag.

Indexing
- ISSN: 0312-8962 (print); 1327-2020 (web)
- LCCN: sn84010478
- OCLC no.: 181818942

Links
- Journal homepage; Online access; Online archive

The Australian Journal of Management is a triannual peer-reviewed academic journal that covers research in accounting, applied economics, finance, industrial relations, political science, psychology, statistics, and other disciplines in relation to their application to management. The journal was established in 1976 and is published by SAGE Publications in association with the Australian School of Business. The editor-in-chief is Andrew Jackson (University of New South Wales). The founding editor was Ray J. Ball.

== Abstracting and indexing ==
The journal is abstracted and indexed in Scopus, the International Bibliography of the Social Sciences, and the Social Sciences Citation Index. According to the Journal Citation Reports, the journal has a 2022 impact factor of 4.8.

== Editors ==
The following persons have been editors-in-chief of the journal:

- Ray J. Ball
- Chris Adam
- John Conybeare
- Vic Taylor
- Phillip Yetton
- John Roberts
- Robert Marks
- Baljit Sidhu
- Jane Baxter
