= Geoff Wilson (professor) =

Australian nuclear physicist (1938–2020)

Professor Geoff Wilson AM

4th Vice-Chancellor of Deakin University
- In office 1996–2002
- Preceded by: John Hay
- Succeeded by: Sally Walker

Personal details
- Born: Geoffrey Victor Herbert Wilson; 23 September 1938 Mentone, Victoria, Australia
- Died: 9 January 2020 (aged 81) Geelong, Victoria, Australia
- Profession: Physicist, administrator

Academic work
- Discipline: Physics
- Sub-discipline: nuclear magnetic resonance spectroscopy, low temperature physics
- Institutions: Central Queensland University; Deakin University

Geoffrey Victor Herbert Wilson AM (23 September 1938 – 9 January 2020) was an Australian nuclear physicist who made contributions to nuclear magnetic resonance spectroscopy and low temperature physics. His research team achieved the lowest temperature ever recorded in Australia. He was born in Mentone, Victoria.

He was National President of the Australian Institute of Physics and held appointments as Chair of the Victorian and Queensland Vice-Chancellors’ Committees, Vice President and Acting President of the Australian Vice-Chancellors’ Committee. He has been Chair of the Boards of Queensland Tertiary Admissions Centre, Victorian Tertiary Admissions Centre and the Graduate Careers Council of Australia.

Wilson had a distinguished career as a physicist with more than 100 published papers in international scientific journals. He was a member of the Australian College of Educators and a director of the Australian Institute of Management.

After retiring from Deakin University he carried out extensive consulting including the development of drafts of the new National Protocols on Higher Education Processes and was a member of the Cooperative Research Centres Committee. He chaired the Board of AMCSearch. Deakin University awards the Geoff Wilson Medal "to celebrate the career of Professor Geoffrey Victor Herbert Wilson AM".

Wilson died on 9 January 2020 in Geelong, Victoria at the age of 81.

== Appointments ==
- Vice-Chancellor and President of Deakin University, 1996–2002.
- Vice-President, Australian Vice-Chancellors' Committee, 1996–1997, a member of the Board of Directors, 1994–1999 and Chair of the Standing Committee on Research.
- Vice-Chancellor of Central Queensland University, 1991–1996.
- Member of the Australian Research Council, 1988–1991, Deputy Chair of the Council, 1989–1990, and held the inaugural chair of the Council's Research Grants Committee.
- Inaugural Rector of the University College of the UNSW at the Australian Defence Force Academy.

He held appointments at Monash and Oxford universities and the Free University of Berlin.

== Awards ==
Wilson made a Member of the Order of Australia (AM) in the 1997 Queen's Birthday Honours. He was awarded the Centenary Medal in 2001 for "For service to tertiary education and academic achievement in the field of physics".
