= Xiuping Jia =

Chinese-Australian

Xiuping Jia is a Chinese-Australian electrical engineer and image processing researcher whose topics of interest include image classification, photogrammetry, remote sensing, and hyperspectral imaging. She is an associate professor of electrical engineering in the School of Engineering and Information Technology at the Australian Defence Force Academy (Canberra) campus of the University of New South Wales (UNSW). She also held an affiliation with the Sino-Australian Joint Research Center for Coastal Zone Management, a joint research project of UNSW with the Ocean University of China.

== Education and career ==
Jia earned a bachelor's degree in 1982 from the Beijing University of Posts and Telecommunications. She joined the UNSW Australian Defence Force Academy School of Engineering and Information Technology in 1988, earning a PhD in 1996 from the University of New South Wales.

== Recognition ==
Jia was named a Fellow of the IEEE in 2021, "for contributions to feature mining and classification of hyperspectral images".
