= Robert Marks (management) =

Robert Marks was the General Editor of the Australian Journal of Management from 1997 to 2010. He is emeritus professor of economics at the University of New South Wales, Sydney (UNSW).

Since 2016 he has been the Editor of the Journal & Proceedings of the Royal Society of New South Wales.

He was the former head of the Economics Cluster of the Australian Graduate School of Management (AGSM).

His current research focuses on the use of illicit drugs, the environmental implications of energy use, the strategic behaviour in markets with a low number of sellers, and the applications of game theory and economics in modelling the adaptive and learning behaviour in oligopolies. Since 2016 he has been the Editor of the Journal and Proceedings of the Royal Society of New South Wales.

He is a fan of Douglas Adams.
