= Jean Chaussivert =

French literary scholar (1932- )

Jean Chaussivert (full name Jean-Stéphane Jacques Roger Henri Chaussivert; born 14 March 1932) was the professor of French at the University of New South Wales in the years 1973–91.

His specialities included French poetry of nineteenth century and enumerative bibliography.

== Early life and education ==
Chaussivert attended the Lycée Chaptal in Paris and later graduated with a License-ès-lettres from the University of Paris and a Maîtrise-ès-lettres from the University of Poitiers.

He worked as a high school teacher until 1964.

== Academic career ==
In the years 1965-71 he was a lecturer in French at the University of Canterbury in New Zealand. He was appointed as senior lecturer in the School of French at the University of New South Wales in 1972 and as associate professor in 1973. In 1974 he succeeded Professor Judith Robinson as the professor of French. He retired from that position in 1991 and remains a Professor Emeritus at the University of NSW.

His research included studies of the poetry of Paul Verlaine and Charles Baudelaire, of French language manuscripts in Australian libraries, and of the history of science.

A number of critics have praised Chaussivert's analysis of Verlaine's poetry. For example, S. M. Bell and W. M. L. Bell, writing in The Year's Work in Modern Language Studies, describe Chaussivert's article ""Esthétique du taratantara verlainien" as: "A most interesting [article], showing how subtly and to what a variety of ends [Verlaine] modifies a metric form traditionally confined to popular poetry and song." Similarly, Arnaud Bernadet singles out Chaussivert's essay "L'Art verlainien dans "La Bonne chanson" for mention.

Michel Morange highlighted Chaussivert's research into an Antipodean episode in the life of Louis Pasteur:

Jean Chaussivert and his colleagues have described a little known episode of Louis Pasteur's life: how he rapidly responded to the internationally advertised reward created in 1887 by the Government of New South Wales in Australia for a biological method to eliminate rabbits.

Chaussivert taught a wide range of courses in French studies, including postgraduate seminars on the French moralists, the French novel, and political theatre.

== Personal life ==
In 1958 he married Nola Geraldine Margetts (1931–2019), a New Zealand citizen, in Turriff, Aberdeenshire, Scotland. They had three sons.

== Select bibliography ==
=== Books: As author ===
- L'art verlainien dans La bonne chanson, Paris: A. G. Nizet, 1973.
- French Manuscripts Held in Australian National and State Libraries, O'Connor, A.C.T. : DGAF/Alliance Franca̧ise Australie, 2006. Joint author: Anne-Marie Nisbet.
- La Petite Musique de Verlaine. « Romances sans paroles. Sagesse », Paris: Société d'Édition d'Enseignement Supérieur, 1982. Fellow contributors: J. Beauverd, J.H. Bornecque, P. Brunel, J.F. Chaussiver, P. Cogny, M. Décaudin, P. Viallaneix, G. Zayed, and E. Zimmermann.

=== Books: As editor ===
- Louis Pasteur and the Pasteur Institute in Australia: Papers from a Symposium Held at the University of New South Wales, 4–5 September 1987, to Mark the Centenary of the Pasteur Institute , Kensington, N.S.W.: University of New South Wales - French-Australian Research Centre, 1988. Joint editor: Maurice Blackman.

=== Prefaces ===
- Dictionnaire Néo-Zélandais - Français / New Zealand - French dictionary, by Ewen Jones and Myreille Pawliez. Preface by J. Chaussivert. Paris: l'Harmattan, 1998 (Collection « Littératures » 9).
- Litterature neo-caledonienne, by Anne-Marie Nisbet. Preface by J. Chaussivert. Sherbrooke, Quebec: Editions Naaman, 1985.

=== Articles ===
- "A propos du « mot » de Sainte-Beuve rapporté par Verlaine", in: Studi Francesi, May–August 1970.
- "Compte Rendu de: P. Ginestier, La Pensée de Camus (Paris, 1964)", in: AUMLA, Australasian Universities Language and Literature Association, no. 25, May 1967.
- "Esthétique du taratantara verlainien", Revue des Sciences humaines, 35, no. 139, July–September 1970, pp. 401-409.
- "Manuscrits français en Australie", in: Anne-Marie Nisbet and Maurice Blackman, eds., The French-Australian Cultural Connection: Papers from a Symposium Held at the University of New South Wales, 16–17 September 1983, Kensington: School of French, University of New South Wales/The CEEFA, 1984, pp. 129-135.
- "L’Institut Pasteur d’Australie", in: M. Morange ed., L’Institut Pasteur. Contributions à son histoire, Paris: La découverte, 1991, pp. 242-252.
- "Le sens haschischin de L'Invitation au voyage", in: AUMLA, Australasian Universities Language and Literature Association, no. 45, May 1977.
- "Situation des Vieilles « Bonnes chansons »", in: Neophilologus, July 1972.
