= Linda Blackall =

Australian microbiologist

- Other name: Linda Louise Blackall
- Education: The University of Queensland
- Scientific career
- Workplaces: University of Melbourne
- Thesis: Actinomycete scum problems in activated sludge plants (1987)
- Website: https://marinemicrobialsymbioses.science.unimelb.edu.au

Linda Louise Blackall FAA is an Australian microbiologist who has studied microbial communities and their applications in water management. She is professor of environmental microbiology at the University of Melbourne.

== Career ==
Blackall has a bachelor's degree, master's degree, and Ph.D. from the University of Queensland, completed respectively in 1981, 1982, and 1987. Her dissertation, in the School of Molecular and Microbial Sciences, was Actinomycete scum problems in activated sludge plants.

She was professor of microbiology at the University of Queensland from 1992 to 2008, where she developed microbial techniques for wastewater treatment as scientific director of the Advanced Water Management Centre and director of research at the Environmental Biotechnology Cooperative Research Centre; in this time period she also held an appointment as professor of microbiology at the University of New South Wales, and in 2005 she became chair of Australia's Antarctic Science Advisory Committee. At the Australian Institute of Marine Science from 2008 to 2010, she shifted her focus to the study of marine microbial communities. She became head of biosciences at Swinburne University of Technology, from 2012 to 2016. She moved to the University of Melbourne in 2017.

Blackall's publications include the edited volume The Microbiology of Activated Sludge. Beyond her research, she collaborates with the publishing company Small Friends Books on science communication books for children, and is a coauthor of the Small Friends book The Squid, the Vibrio and the Moon.

== Recognition ==
The Australian Society for Microbiology gave Blackall their Frank Fenner Research Award in 2001. The International Water Association gave her their Ardern–Lockett award in 2005. In 2020, Blackall was elected as a Fellow of the Australian Academy of Science.
