= Anthony Billingsley =

Australian political analyst

Anthony John Billingsley
- Citizenship: Australian
- Education: Macquarie University (PhD), University of Strathclyde (MSc), University of New South Wales (BA)
- Scientific career
- Fields: International relations
- Workplaces: University of New South Wales

Anthony John Billingsley is an Australian political analyst and senior lecturer at the University of New South Wales. His main interests include Middle Eastern politics and international law. Billingsley is known for his analyses on the Arab Spring, Gaza–Israel conflict, Iranian foreign policy, Iraqi Kurdistan and the political succession in the Arab World.

== Books ==
- Political Succession in the Arab World: Constitutions, Family Loyalties and Islam, Routledge 2010, ISBN 9780415495363
- International Law and the Use of Force: A Documentary and Reference Guide, Shirley V Scott, Anthony John Billingsley and Christopher Michaelsen, Praeger 2010, ISBN 9780313362590
