= Sushmita Ruj =

Indian computer scientist

Sushmita Ruj is an Indian-Australian computer scientist whose research concerns access control, computer security and information privacy. Formerly an associate professor at the Indian Statistical Institute and senior research scientist at CSIRO in Australia, she is an associate professor in computer science and engineering at the University of New South Wales.

Ruj graduated from the Bengal Engineering College (now the Indian Institute of Engineering Science and Technology, Shibpur) in 2004, with a bachelor's degree in computer science. She earned a master's degree in computer science in 2006 from the Indian Statistical Institute, and completed her Ph.D. there in 2010. Her dissertation, Application of Combinatorial Structures to Key Predistribution in Sensor Networks and Traitor Tracing, was supervised by Bimal Kumar Roy.

After postdoctoral research at Lund University and the University of Ottawa, Ruj returned to India as an assistant professor at the Indian Institute of Technology Indore in 2012, and moved back to the Indian Statistical Institute in 2013. She was promoted to associate professor there before moving to CSIRO and then UNSW.
