= Elanor Huntington =

Australian computer scientist

Elanor Huntington FTSE
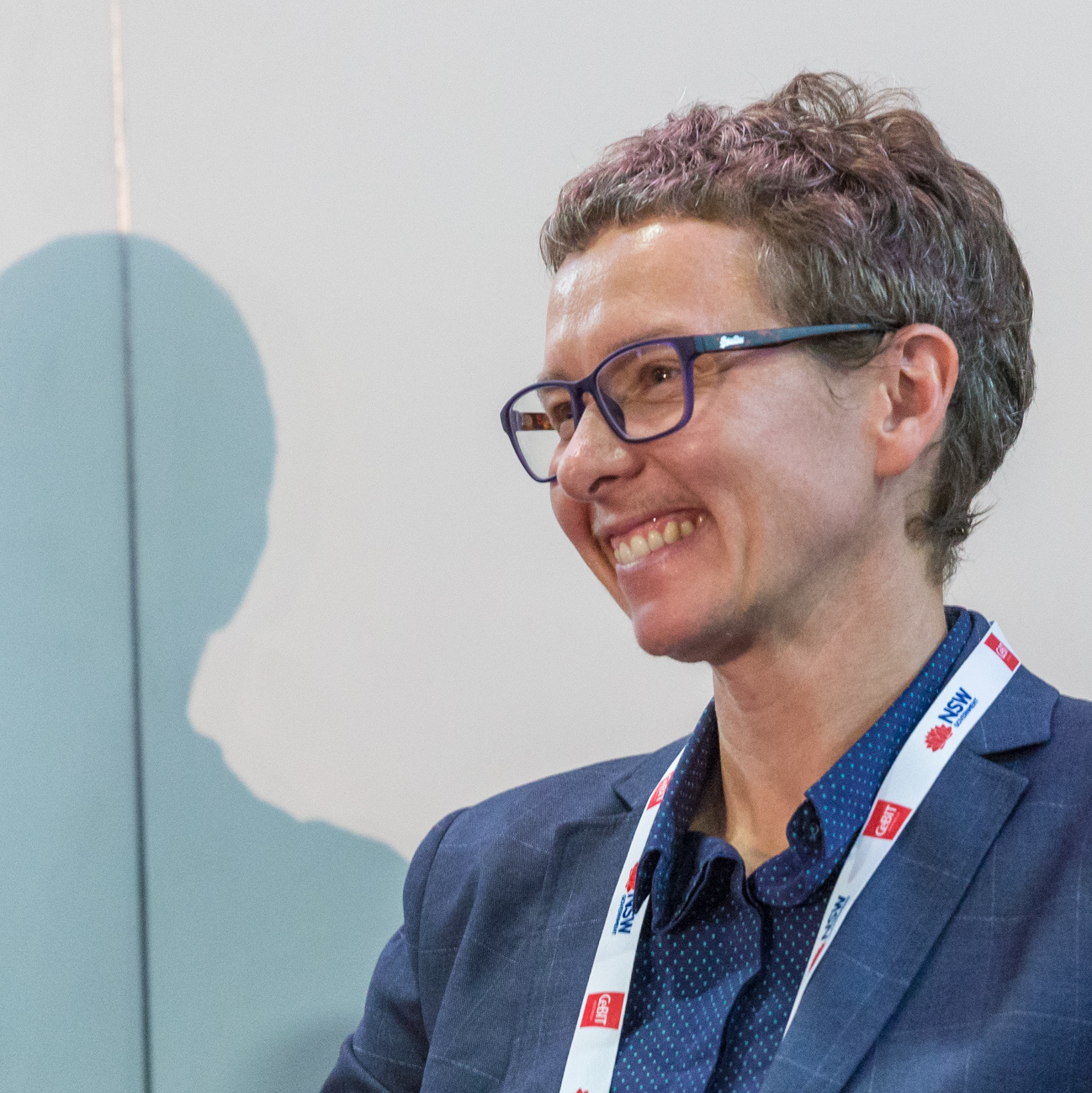
- Huntington in 2018
- Education: Australian National University
- Scientific career
- Workplaces: Defence Science and Technology Organisation; University of New South Wales; Australian National University; Commonwealth Scientific and Industrial Research Organisation

Elanor H. Huntington is an Australian scientist and engineer who is Deputy Chief Executive at the Commonwealth Scientific and Industrial Research Organisation and a professor of Quantum Cybernetics at the Australian National University. She led a research program in the Australian Research Council Centre of Excellence for Quantum Computation and Communication Technology.

== Early life and education ==
Huntington studied physics at the Australian National University and graduated in 1996 with a University Medal. She decided that she enjoyed using science to help others, and switched to engineering. She earned her PhD in 1999 working in experimental quantum optics. Huntington joined the Australian Defence Science and Technology Organisation after graduating, where she worked for 18 months before joining the University of New South Wales Canberra at the Australian Defence Force Academy.

== Research ==
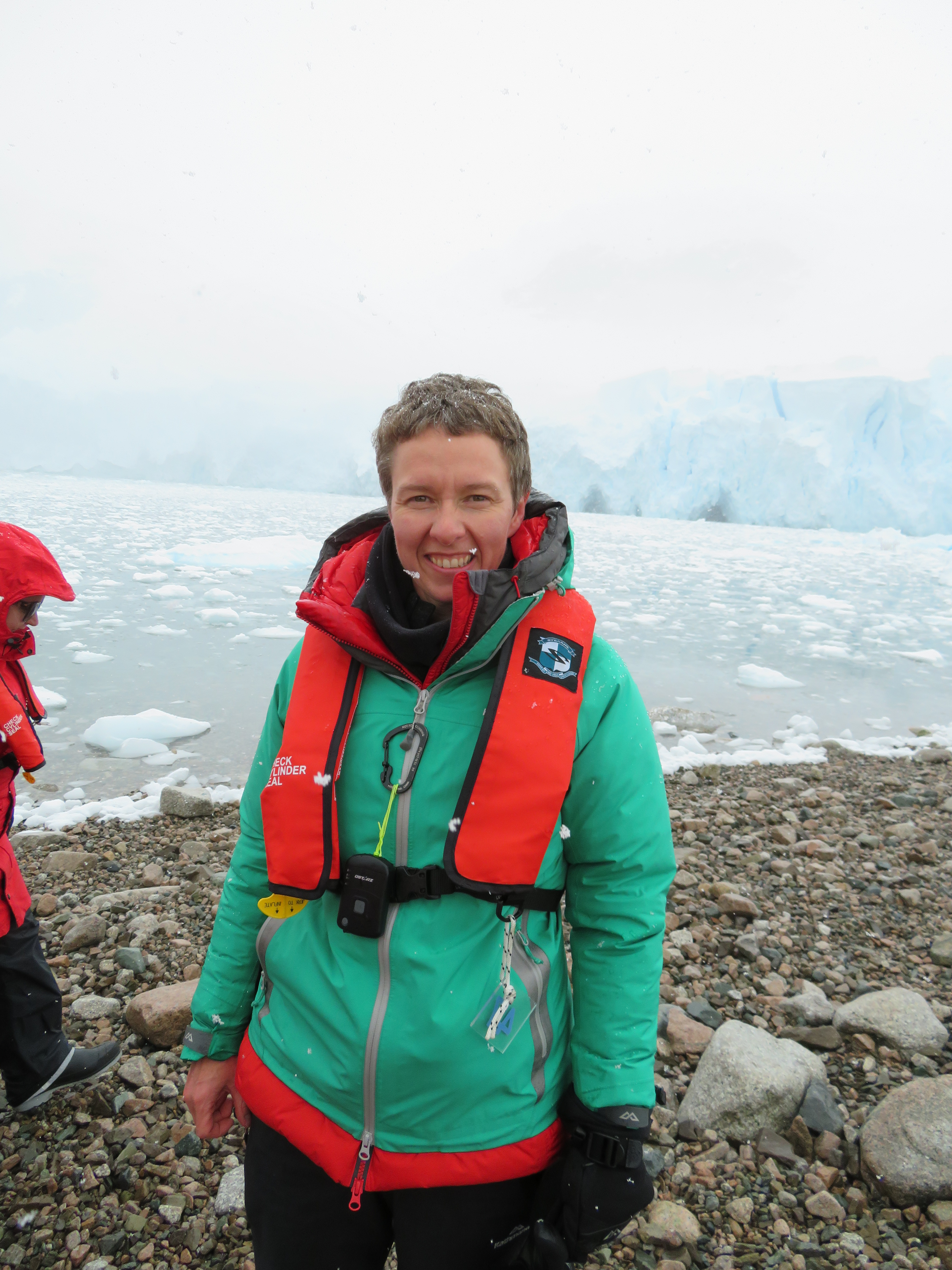
Huntington in Antarctica

Huntington specialises in high speed measurements and the generation of non-classical states. She works on quantum computation, creating optical microchips that can detect, generate and manipulate states of light. She is interested in the intersection of quantum theory and applications. She joined the University of New South Wales in 2000. She has worked in the School of Engineering and Information Technology at the Australian Defence Force Academy at University of New South Wales, where she was made Head of the School of Engineering and IT in 2010. She leads a research program in the Australian Research Council Centre of Excellence for Quantum Computation and Communication Technology.

In 2011, Huntington and collaborators made a major breakthrough in quantum computation, by demonstrating that it was possible to teleport quantum non-Gaussian beams of light on a quantum superposition. These days, she makes use of waveguide technology, coupled with systems engineering, to design and build quantum technologies. She was appointed Dean of the Australian National University College of Engineering and Computer Science in June 2014. She was the first woman to be made an Executive Dean of Engineering in Australia, the first woman to be a professor of engineering at ANU, and the first woman to be Chair of the Australian Group of Eight Engineering Deans. She is also a member of the Global Engineering Deans Council. She discussed quantum computation at the World Economic Forum.

Huntington believes that in the future, public trust in engineering will become increasingly important. She delivered a TED Talk in 2017 on Why We Need Engineers Now More Than Ever and is leading the Reimagine Investment at the Australian National University to bring those ideas into being. The Reimagine Investment under Huntington is intended to redefine the nature of engineering and computing skills, who will exercise them and how. Genevieve Bell is a foundation member of Reimagine and the leader of its flagship program to create the next engineering discipline. Huntington has discussed the future of engineering at the Sydney Writers' Festival. and the Australian Strategic Policy Institute, where she looks to improve the gender balance of the engineering community.

== Honours and awards ==
Huntington was elected a Fellow of the Australian Academy of Technology and Engineering in 2020, she was made an honorary fellow of Engineers Australia in 2017 and she was a finalist in the 2019 Eureka Prizes.
