= Christopher P. Marquis =

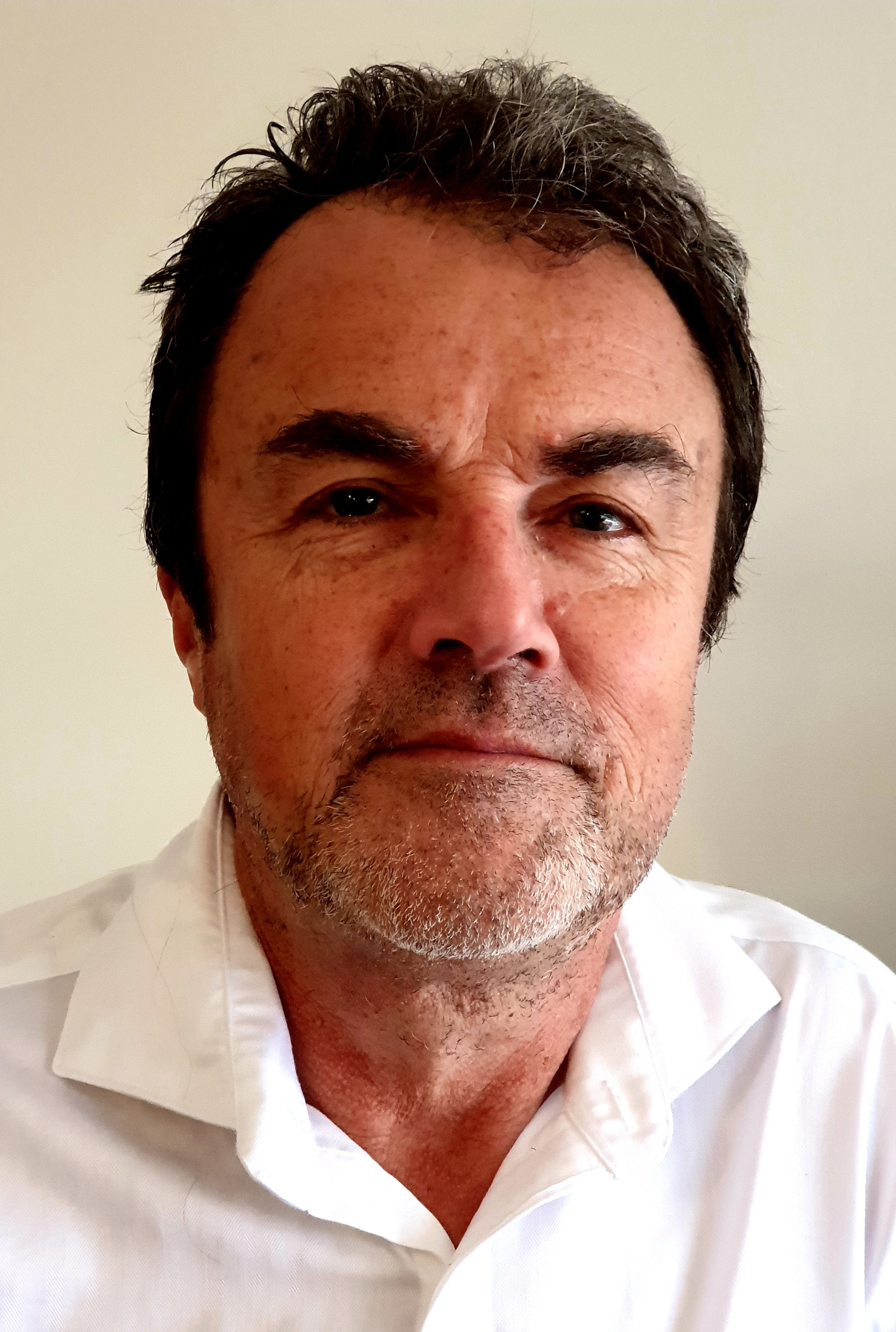

Christopher P. Marquis is a bioprocess engineer and academic at the University of New South Wales (UNSW), Sydney, Australia. His research covers the development of biotechnology products through the lens of a bioprocess engineer, focusing on the production of proteins and other bioproducts, including nucleic acids. He is the academic director of the UNSW (see link below). He is the co-author of over 80 refereed journal articles. He also actively engages with industry.

Christopher P Marquis
Nationality	Australian
Known for	Bioprocessing, fermentation, cell culture, proteins, biologics
Institutions	University of NSW, Sydney, Australia

== Career ==
Marquis received his doctorate in biochemical engineering from the University of Sydney in 1994. He has a BSc (chemistry) and a BE(hons) in biochemical engineering from the University of Sydney. Since 1994, he has held an academic positions at the University of New South Wales in the School of Biotechnology and Biomolecular Sciences (BABS). In 2002, he completed a graduate diploma in technology management from Deakin University

== Research ==
Marquis's current academic research focuses on:

- Generation and characterisation of recombinant spider silk proteins.
- Generation of silk-inspired biomaterials.
- Bioprocessing optimisation for enzyme and cytokine production
- Plasmid production for gene therapy and in vitro mRNA synthesis
- Production of protein-coding circular RNAs

Marquis has also in the past had successful collaborations in other disciplines, including those in the areas of:

- Production and purification recombinant reductive dehalogenases
- Nanobiotechnology; the interface of nanoparticles with biological systems

== Teaching ==
Marquis is the academic convenor of the Biotechnology undergraduate program at UNSW. He teaches bioprocessing and in areas of biotechnology commercialisation. He also supervises PhD and Honours students.
