= Jinhong Yuan =

Australian electrical engineer

Jinhong Yuan is an Australian electrical engineer and academic. He is a professor of telecommunications with the School of Electrical Engineering and Telecommunications at the University of New South Wales. He was named a Fellow of the Institute of Electrical and Electronics Engineers (IEEE) in 2016 for his contributions to multi-antenna wireless communication technologies.
