= Mini-Reviews in Medicinal Chemistry =

- Discipline: Medicinal chemistry
- Language: English
- Edited by: Atta-ur-Rahman, M. Iqbal Choudhary, George Perry

Publication details
- History: 2001–present
- Publisher: Bentham Science Publishers
- Frequency: 20 Issues/year
- Impact factor: 3.862 (2020)

Standard abbreviations
- ISO 4: Mini-Rev. Med. Chem.

Indexing
- CODEN: MMCIAE
- ISSN: 1389-5575 (print); 1875-5607 (web)
- OCLC no.: 615044453

Links
- Journal homepage; Online access; Online archive

Mini-Reviews in Medicinal Chemistry is a monthly peer-reviewed medical journal covering all aspects of medicinal chemistry. It is published by Bentham Science Publishers and the editors-in-chief are Atta-ur-Rahman (University of Cambridge), M. Iqbal Choudhary (University of Karachi), and George Perry (University of Texas at San Antonio).

== Abstracting and indexing ==
The journal is abstracted and indexed in:

- Biochemistry & Biophysics Citation Index
- BIOSIS Previews
- Chemical Abstracts Service/CASSI
- Index Medicus/MEDLINE/PubMed
- Science Citation Index Expanded
- Scopus
- Embase/Excerpta Medica

According to the Journal Citation Reports, the journal has a 2020 impact factor of 3.862.

== Controversy concerning Mini-Reviews in Medicinal Chemistry ==
Mini-Reviews in Medicinal Chemistry employs peer review, however, several scientists have raised concerns about whether it is a predatory journal after being invited to review articles or serve as an editor in areas where they have no scientific expertise.
