= Gilles J. Guillemin =

Australian neuroscientist

- Education: University of Burgundy (PhD)
- Scientific career
- Fields: Neuroscience

Gilles J. Guillemin (born January 1967) is an Australian neuroscientist. He received the Ordre national du Mérite in 2019 in recognition of his work in medical research. He was awarded a Member of the Order of Australia in 2021.

He worked at University of NSW from 2003 till 2012.

He worked at Macquarie University from 2012 and resigned in 2023. In 2022 there was a research misconduct investigation into his work launched by the university. The preliminary investigation, that took 2 years to complete, identified some potential breaches of the university's code were found

In 2024, The final report cleared Prof Guillemin of research misconduct. Today he works in private research industry.

== Life ==
Born in Dijon, France in January 1967, Guillemin moved to Australia in 1997 to pursue post-doctoral studies after he obtained a PhD in Neurovirology from the University of Burgundy.

== Career ==
Guillemin has been working in the field of Neuroimmunology since then, with a focus on tryptophan metabolism research.

Guillemin started his career as a senior research scientist at St Vincent's Private Hospital (1997-2003), then he became an associate professor at the University of New South Wales (2003-2012).

In 2011, he was involved in the founding of The Motor Neurone Disease (MND) Research Centre at Macquarie University. He was co-director of the centre from 2011 to 2016. As part of his work at the centre, Guillemin and his group study "the involvement of tryptophan in MND" and focus on neuroinflammation and neurotoxicity.

Guillemin has been studying the involvement of tryptophan catabolism (via the kynurenine pathway- KP B) in human neurodegenerative diseases for more than 20 years. Guillemin and his teams have conducted research that demonstrates the importance of the KP in multiple sclerosis, Alzheimer's disease and motor neuron disease, which has diagnostic, prognostic and therapeutic potential. This research has been extended to looking at the chemicals in the brain and their relation to other diseases such as depression, suicide, autism and cancers.

Guillemin is part of a research group working on neuroactive (toxic or protective) metabolites derived from tryptophan.

As a result of their research, the team has identified a "new process for the uptake of the neurotoxin quinolinic acid (QUIN) in human neurons that could reduce the impact of major inflammatory diseases". The study built on the results of previous research by Guillemin that demonstrated excessive amounts of QUIN accumulate within the human brain of Alzheimer's and motor neuron disease (MND) patients.

As an extension of his research on tryptophan and QUIN, Guillemin has also conducted research into Multiple Sclerosis (MS), including a project that discovered the first blood biomarker for MS. The result of the project was the identification of a biomarker that can discriminate between the three subtypes of MS with 85-90 percent accuracy, allowing for a more accurate diagnosis of MS in patients.

Guillemin has been the Editor-in-Chief of The International Journal on Tryptophan Research between 2008-2022

He was appointed as a professor of neuroscience at Macquarie University in 2012. He however resigned from the university in 2023, following an investigation in potential research misconduct. A report on the preliminary investigation was published in November 2023, indicating there was indeed a potential breach of the university's research code. In 2024, The final report cleared Prof Guillemin of research misconduct.

In 2020, the editors of PLOS ONE retracted an article co-authored by Guillemin, citing concerns about the integrity of some of its data.[31]. He has 10 papers retracted after the work of several of his foreign and domestic came under scrutiny. Gilles Guillemin claimed that certain images in his papers appear to have been doctored, but not by him Prof Guillemin acknowledged that certain images in these manuscripts appear to have been doctored, however not by him or his team.. Most of the retractions were done at the request of Prof Guillemin. It is important to highlight that ALL the scientific work reported in these retracted manuscripts was not performed in Prof Guillemin’s laboratory or by any member of his research team but by external collaborators.

=== Pandis ===
In 2018, Guillemin co-created PANDIS with Catherine Stace. PANDIS is an Australian not-for-profit organisation.

The aim of the organisation is to identify "infectious pathogens in Australian patients with various types of chronic diseases," called PAN for "All" and DIS for "diseases", with a focus on tick-borne diseases.

=== Motor Neurone Disease BioBank ===
In 2012, Guillemin, with his colleague Dominic Rowe, co-created the first motor neuron disease biobank in Australia.

The Motor Neurone Disease (MND) Biobank houses samples that are then available to for use in research projects. One such project was conducted by Guillemin and his team around the analysis of the blood plasma of Amyotrophic lateral sclerosis patients to find ways to improve diagnosis.

=== Community engagement ===
Guillemin was involved in "STEM Professionals in Schools" a CSIRO Education program where he shares his experience as a scientist to primary and secondary school students, from 2009 to 2017.

== Sports ==
Guillemin was a member of the Australian Men's Handball Team from 2003 to 2005. He coached at state, national, and World Championship levels, and he served as a Technical Official at the 2000 Olympic Games in Sydney.

== Selected publications ==
As of 2021, Guillemin had over 230 peer-reviewed articles in professional journals. The most cited of these are:

- Opitz, Christiane A.; Litzenburger, Ulrike M.; Sahm, Felix; Ott, Martina; Tritschler, Isabel; Trump, Saskia; Schumacher, Theresa; Jestaedt, Leonie; Schrenk, Dieter; Weller, Michael; Jugold, Manfred; Guillemin, Gilles J.; Miller, Christine L.; Lutz, Christian; Radlwimmer, Bernhard; Lehmann, Irina; von Deimling, Andreas; Wick, Wolfgang; Platten, Michael (2011). "An endogenous tumour-promoting ligand of the human aryl hydrocarbon receptor" (PDF). Nature. 478 (7368). Springer Science and Business Media LLC: 197–203. Bibcode:2011Natur.478..197O. doi:10.1038/nature10491. ISSN 0028-0836. PMID 21976023. S2CID 4314650.
- Guillemin, Gilles J.; Brew, Bruce J. (11 November 2003). "Microglia, macrophages, perivascular macrophages, and pericytes: a review of function and identification". Journal of Leukocyte Biology. 75 (3). Wiley: 388–397. doi:10.1189/jlb.0303114. ISSN 0741-5400. PMID 14612429.

== Professional memberships ==
- 2012–2016: Elected President of the International Neurotoxicity Society (NTS)
- 2014–2020: Elected President of the International Society of Tryptophan research (ISTRY)
- 2014- : Chairman, Scientific Advisory Board, Metabrain Research (France)
- Member, Australian-French Association for Research and Innovation

== Awards and honours ==
- 2010: John and Eileen Haddin Award for outstanding research in geriatrics, awarded by the Rebecca Cooper Foundation.
- 2017: Awarded Trish MS Research Awards by the Trish Multiple Sclerosis Research Foundation.
- 2019, November: Awarded "Chevalier de l'Ordre du Mérite (Knight of the Order of Merit) " by the French government in recognition of his work in medical research
- 2020, March: Awarded a Fellowship of The Royal Society of New South Wales.
- 2021, June: Awarded a Member of the Order of Australia "for significant service to science education, to Motor Neurone Disease research, and to sport".
