= Pamela Rickard =

Australian biochemist

Pamela Athalie Deidre Rickard (8 June 1928 – 26 October 2002) was an Australian biochemist. She served as head of the University of New South Wales School of Biological Sciences from 1981 to 1988.

Born Pamela Athalie Deidre Cornford in Sydney on 26 October 1928, she worked for a few years at the Daily Telegraph newspaper, before completing a TAFE course and entering Sydney University as a mature age student. She then gained a master's in biochemistry at the New South Wales University of Technology (now the University of New South Wales), writing her thesis on the "iron-containing pigments of certain fungi" under Professor Bernhard Ralph and Dr Frank Moss, and graduating in 1961. She then began a PhD in London on the biosynthesis of porphyrins under Professor Claude Rimington, finishing in 1963. She then began a permanent lecturing position at the University of New South Wales, where she would remain until retirement in 1988.

In the mid 1960s, she became part of the cutting edge field of biotechnology when the school was restructured as the Department of Biotechnology and Biochemical Engineering, only the third biotechnology department in the world at the time. She worked initially on yeast biochemistry, followed by enzyme technology, making interesting discoveries relating to the Crabtree effect, where cytochromes are not synthesised in high-glucose yeast environments. Her group also found that synthesis of other yeast fermentation enzymes was enhanced in such environments, discoveries useful to the brewing industry.

In the 1970s, she worked on the use of enzymes in wine production, with the goal of using sultana grapes for wine, before moving on to the digestion of ligno-cellulosic waste. In 1974 she published a review of the use of enzyme technology in industry.

She retired in 1988 and received an emeritus professorship. She compiled and edited a History of the Development of Biotechnology at UNSW in the same year.

Rickard died on 26 October 2002.
