= Ned Abraham =

American professor

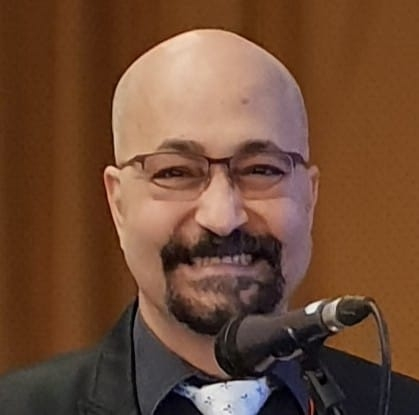
- Ned Abraham
- Born: Nedeem Ibrahim; 11 November 1961 (age 65); Alexandria, Egypt
- Education: Alexandria University; University of Sydney
- Years active: 1986–present
- Medical career
- Profession: Surgeon Author
- Field: General and colorectal surgery
- Institutions: University of New South Wales
- Research: Academic Surgery

Ned Abraham (born November 11, 1961) was an Associate Professor of Surgery at the Faculty of Medicine, University of New South Wales and is a general and colorectal surgeon, a clinical academic and a retired Australian Army Reserve Officer. He has spoken at multiple national and international meetings in four continents and his published articles in general surgery, colorectal and academic surgery have been cited in the medical literature close to two thousand times. He continues to practice surgery in Coffs Harbour, NSW, Australia. In 2026, the Australian Health Practitioner Regulation Agency began investigating a surgical incident that occurred while he was working at Hamilton Base Hospital.

== Early life ==
Abraham was born in Alexandria, Egypt on 11 November 1961, in a conservative family of four sons. Nasar's Egypt at the time was between its second and third wars with Israel. Ned lived through The Six-Day War in June 1967 when he was five and The Yom Kippur War in October 1973 when he was eleven which probably caused Ned to develop an early passion for helping humanity and an intense desire to become a surgeon since he was eleven. He excelled in his school years and was seventeen when he was accepted into the Faculty of Medicine, University of Alexandria in Egypt in 1979.

== Education, qualifications and career ==
For financial reasons, Abraham had a number of failed attempts to attend university in the United Kingdom and the United States. He returned to Alexandria and completed the requirements for the degree of a Bachelor of Medicine with a grade of Distinction with Honours at The Faculty of Medicine, University of Alexandria, which he obtained in 1985. He served for one year with the mine disposal team of the Egyptian Army in 1986 disposing of World War II mines in El Alamein. He moved to Australia shortly afterwards. He completed his Internship and Resident years at North West Regional Hospital in Burnie and Mersey Community Hospital in Tasmania in 1992.

At the end of 1993 Abraham moved to work at the Royal Darwin Hospital in the Northern Territory, before moving to work at the Royal Prince Alfred Hospital in New South Wales in January 1995 where he stayed for the following eleven years. In that time, he completed and obtained the Degree of a Master of Medicine from the University of Sydney in 1998 before commencing his training in General Surgery.

He succeeded in entering the Advanced General Surgical Training Program at the Royal Prince Alfred Hospital in 1998 and became the first non-specialist overseas trained doctor from a non-English speaking country to be accepted in the general surgical training program at that hospital in its recent history.

In 1995, a year before his first son David Marcus was born, he enlisted in the Australian Army Reserve. He was posted on deployments as a ranked officer and as a civilian in Bougainville, Solomon Islands and Papua New Guinea. His second son Daniel Jonathan was born in 1998.

By coincidence and in 2003, he became the first man in history to be awarded a surgical fellowship by a woman, Ms Anne Kolbe, who was the first female president of a college of surgeons anywhere in the world. After obtaining the Fellowship of the Royal Australasian College of Surgeons, he qualified for the Membership of the Colorectal Surgical Society of Australia and New Zealand.

At the completion of his surgical training in Australia, he was awarded the Fellowship of the Royal College of Surgeons of England by an invitation from its Vice President in 2003. He worked as the Surgical Superintendent of the Royal Prince Alfred Hospital for three years before moving to Coffs Harbour, New South Wales, where he took up a job as a Senior Lecturer in Surgery at the Faculty of Medicine, University of New South Wales, as well as public and private hospital appointments as a colorectal and general surgeon.

He studied "Evidence" then obtained the degree of a Doctor of Philosophy (PhD) in Surgery from the University of Sydney in 2008. In 2009, he became the first clinical academic to be promoted to the level of an Associate Professor in the eleven-year history of the Rural Medical School, UNSW Australia.

In 2020, Abraham revealed what he considered to be serious management shortcomings in the healthcare system in Australia which caught significant media attention. He was accused of bringing disrepute to NSW Health and was referred to Human Resources for Disciplinary Action. This was around the same time of the publication of his first book about clinical injustice in Australia. Abraham reigned from NSW Health and following a protracted legal battle, it is believed that a confidential apology was issued to Abraham by a NSW area health service with an out-of-court settlement in his favour. However, and concurrently, the hospital administration stacked up clinical complaints against him. Although no clinical performance issues were found by the medical regulators, Abraham put an end to the conflict by undertaking not to perform a specific procedure for rectal cancer and continued to practice surgery in Australia. He faced another highly charged controversy under similar circumstances when he worked at another hospital in Victoria Australia. Again, no clinical performance issues were found by the medical regulator as Abraham's specialist registration was not changed.

== Publications and research ==
In 2021, he published his first book about bullying and harassment in the healthcare system (The Clinical Justice System). In 2022, he published his second book on the origins of life and of the universe (Simple Answers to the Big Questions). In 2023, he published his third book about dishonesty in science (Scientific Lies).

Abraham published more than forty articles and abstracts and has given more than forty presentations at national and international meetings in Australia, New Zealand, China, Singapore, Croatia, Italy, Thailand and the United States. His published work has been cited in the medical literature close to two thousand times.

Abraham wrote the first published systematic review of reasons for non-entry of eligible patients into surgical randomised trials, the first published prospective study of reasons for non-entry of eligible patients into a surgical randomised trial, the first surgical randomised control trial to have ever been conducted at the Royal Darwin Hospital, the first published prospective comparative study of myocardial injuries following repair of aortic aneurysms before any randomised trials were conducted on the issue, the first published meta-analysis of non-randomised comparative studies of a surgical procedure, the first published direct comparison between a randomised trial and a historical control study of a surgical procedure, the first published meta-analysis of the short term outcomes after laparoscopic resection for colon cancer and the first published direct comparison between a meta-analysis of randomised and that of non-randomised studies of a surgical procedure.

He was interviewed by ABC Radio NSW and 2CS Radio three times, the Sydney Morning Herald, The Financial Review and by National Channel 7 News about ten times promoting local and national health issues between 2007 and 2024 and his correspondence was tabled in the NSW Parliament in May 2008.

In 2018, one of Abraham's publications was listed as one of the top 100 most influential articles of all time on keyhole surgery.

== Awards ==
He was granted the Award of Best Papers presented at Surgical Grand Rounds by the Division of Surgery at Royal Prince Alfred Hospital in 1997, The Trevor Taylor Prize of the Staff Specialist Committee & Management Board, Royal Darwin Hospital twice, in 1994 and in 1995 and The Patron's Prize by the Medical Board of Royal Prince Alfred Hospital in 1995.

=== Fellowships ===
- Fellow of the Royal Australasian College of Surgeons
- Fellow of the Royal College of Surgeons of England (September 2004)
- Member of the Colorectal Surgical Society of Australia & New Zealand – CSSANZ
- Member of the Section of Colon and Rectal Surgery, RACS
- Member of General Surgeons Australia – GSA
- Member of the NSW & ACT Regional Subcommittee Board in General Surgery
- Supervisor of Basic & Advanced Surgical Training (Retired)
- Member of Oncology Group (Colorectal) of the NSW Cancer Institute

== Personal life ==
Abraham has two sons, David Marcus Abraham and Daniel Jonathan Abraham.

== Selected works ==
- Selby WS, Griffin S, Abraham N, Solomon MJ (2002). "Appendectomy protects against the development of ulcerative colitis but does not affect its course". The American Journal of Gastroenterology. 97 (11): 2834–8. doi:10.1111/j.1572-0241.2002.07049.x. PMID 12425556. S2CID 2606497.
- Abraham N, Selby W, Lazarus R, Solomon M (2003). "Is smoking an indirect risk factor for the development of ulcerative colitis? An age- and sex-matched case-control study". Journal of Gastroenterology and Hepatology. 18 (2): 139–46. doi:10.1046/j.1440-1746.2003.02953.x. PMID 12542596. S2CID 46633728.
- Ho-Shon K. Waugh R. Abraham N. Solomon M. Angiographic Intervention in the Diagnosis and Treatment of Acute Unstable Lower GI Haemorrhage – A Retrospective Study. Australasian Radiology. 47(2):A7-9, June 2003.
- Abraham N, Eyers A, Pathma-Nathan N (2004). "Acute diverticular phlegmon in colonic neovagina". ANZ Journal of Surgery. 74 (9): 809–10. doi:10.1111/j.1445-1433.2004.03159.x. PMID 15379823. S2CID 43286080.
- Abstract: The Short Term Outcomes of laparoscopic colectomy for colorectal cancer; a meta-analysis. Abraham N.S. ANZ Journal of Surgery, June 2004
- Abraham NS, Young JM, Solomon MJ (2004). "Meta-analysis of short-term outcomes after laparoscopic resection for colorectal cancer". The British Journal of Surgery. 91 (9): 1111–24. doi:10.1002/bjs.4640. PMID 15449261. S2CID 10493744.
- Abraham N, Lemech L, Sandroussi C, Sullivan D, May J (2005). "A prospective study of subclinical myocardial damage in endovascular versus open repair of infrarenal abdominal aortic aneurysms". Journal of Vascular Surgery. 41 (3): 377–80, discussion 380–1. doi:10.1016/j.jvs.2004.11.038. PMID 15838465.
- Abraham NS, Young JM, Solomon MJ (2006). "A systematic review of reasons for nonentry of eligible patients into surgical randomized controlled trials". Surgery. 139 (4): 469–83. doi:10.1016/j.surg.2005.08.014. PMID 16627056.
- Abraham N.S. Hewett P. Young J.M. Solomon M.J. Non-entry of eligible patients into the Australasian Laparoscopic Colon Cancer Study. ANZ Journal of Surgery. 76(9):825-829, 2006.
- Abraham NS, Durairaj R, Young JM, Young CJ, Solomon MJ (2006). "How does an historic control study of a surgical procedure compare with the 'gold standard'?". Diseases of the Colon and Rectum. 49 (8): 1141–8. doi:10.1007/s10350-006-0614-2. PMID 16841269. S2CID 19471887.
- Abraham NS, Byrne CM, Young JM, Solomon MJ (2007). "Meta-analysis of non-randomized comparative studies of the short-term outcomes of laparoscopic resection for colorectal cancer". ANZ Journal of Surgery. 77 (7): 508–16. doi:10.1111/j.1445-2197.2007.04141.x. PMID 17610681. S2CID 45582174.
- Abraham N.S. Thesis for the Degree of Doctor of Philosophy (PhD) in Surgery, Faculty of Medicine of The University of Sydney: "A methodological assessment of non-randomised comparative studies as an alternative to the difficult-to-conduct randomised control trials of surgical procedures using the example of laparoscopic colorectal surgery" 2008.
- Abraham NS, Byrne CJ, Young JM, Solomon MJ (2010). "Meta-analysis of well-designed nonrandomized comparative studies of surgical procedures is as good as randomized controlled trials". Journal of Clinical Epidemiology. 63 (3): 238–45. doi:10.1016/j.jclinepi.2009.04.005. PMID 19716267.
- Article "Five-year results show keyhole bowel cancer surgery is safe and effective" Health and ageing news University of Leeds Online Article published 4 November 2010 http://www.leeds.ac.uk/news/article/1196/five-year_results_show_keyhole_bowel_cancer_surgery_is_safe_and_effective
- Abraham N, Albayati S (2011). "Enhanced recovery after surgery programs hasten recovery after colorectal resections". World Journal of Gastrointestinal Surgery. 3 (1): 1–6. doi:10.4240/wjgs.v3.i1.1. PMC 3030737. PMID 21286218.
- Ned Abraham: Do we really need randomized trials to assess colorectal cancer surgical procedures? Poster abs#254 Tripartite Colorectal Meeting 2011, Cairns, Queensland, Australia, 3–7 July
