= Quakers Hill Nursing Home fire =

2011 fire in New South Wales

Coordinates: 33.7195°S 150.8915°E

- Location: Quakers Hill, Sydney, New South Wales, Australia
- Date: 18 November 2011
- Attack type: Mass murder, Arson
- Weapon: Cigarette lighter
- Deaths: 11
- Perpetrator: Roger Dean
- Motive: To hide his theft of prescription drugs
- Charges: Murder (11 counts)
- Verdict: Guilty

On 18 November 2011, an early morning fire at Quakers Hill Nursing Home in Sydney, Australia killed eleven elderly residents, seriously injured others and caused the evacuation of up to 100 people. Three people died in the fire, and a further eight residents of the home died later in hospital from their injuries. The fire started in two places and was regarded by police as suspicious. A nurse working in the home, 36-year-old Roger Dean, was arrested and charged with four counts of murder. He was later charged over more subsequent deaths.

== Fire ==
At 4:53am on 18 November 2011, Fire and Rescue NSW (FRNSW) responded to an automatic fire alarm at the Quakers Hill nursing home. The fire was started in two separate wings, one occupied and one unoccupied. This caused initial confusion for the nearly 100 firefighters dispatched to the scene. Along with the firefighters, twenty fire appliances were also sent out. Four workers were present and helped evacuate almost 100 sick or elderly patients, some of whom were immobile. Roger Dean, a nurse working in the home, was accused of stealing painkillers the night before the fire. He set the fires in an attempt to hide the evidence of his crime. It is said the crime could have been prevented with quicker action by the nursing home. The fire was completely preventable, according to several firefighters, but at the time Australia had no law requiring nursing homes to have sprinklers installed. The deceased victims ranged in ages 73 to 97.

== Aftermath ==
Dean was arrested and charged with four counts of murder. He was later charged over more subsequent deaths. In November 2012, he pleaded not guilty to eight counts of recklessly causing grievous bodily harm and eleven counts of murder. He had wished to plead guilty to manslaughter, but that was rejected by the Crown. He did plead guilty to two larceny charges relating to theft of prescription painkillers from the nursing home. He stood trial in the Supreme Court in May 2013. Later the same month, Dean pleaded guilty to eleven counts of murder, and in August 2013 he was sentenced to life imprisonment without the possibility of parole.

In September 2014, an inquest into the deaths opened, and its results were released in March 2015. After finding that the nursing home operators Domain Principal Group (now known as Opal Aged Care) did not look into Dean's past before employment, Hugh Dillon, the NSW deputy coroner recommended: a database of healthcare workers be created with details of their background; that workers be trained to recognize signs of co-workers abusing drugs; and that nursing home door and corridors be constructed to allow beds to be moved rapidly during emergencies. Dillon also suggested that two fire-fighters receive bravery awards.

As of March 2015 Opal Aged Care has 69 homes in Australia.

As a result of the fire, nursing homes in Australia are now required by law to install sprinklers.
