= Ralph Mobbs =

Australian neurosurgeon

Ralph Mobbs is an Australian neurosurgeon who specialises in spinal surgery. He operates at Prince of Wales Private and Public Hospital. He is an Associate Professor of Neurosurgery at the University of New South Wales.

== Early life and education ==
Mobbs attended the University of New South Wales, graduating with a Bachelor of Medicine, Bachelor of Surgery (MBBS) in 1993. He completed his Master of Surgery (MS) from UNSW in 2002. He qualified as a neurosurgeon in 2003.

== Career ==
Mobbs trained in Sydney and worked for some time in Canada. He currently sub-specialises is spinal neurosurgery. He is the founder and director of the NeuroSpine Clinic at the Prince of Wales Private Hospital, the founder of AustSpine (acquired by LifeHealthCare in 2009), Jasper MedTech (JMT), the Wearables and Gait Assessment Research group (WAGAR) and the NeuroSpine Surgery Research group (NSURG). He is an Associate Professor of Neurosurgery at the University of New South Wales.

His interests include surgical technique and work flow, design and development of medical prosthesis, patient-specific implants (PSIs), neuroscience research and teaching.

Mobbs has received media attention for his interests in personalisation of medicine, in particular for PSIs and has written multiple commentary pieces on the future of personalisation of medical implants, He was the first surgeon to design and implant a 3D printed spinal prosthesis into a cancer patient.

== Research work ==
Mobbs is the chair of the NSURG and currently supervises students, MS and PhD researchers. NSURG maintains a high-volume research program with hundreds of publications. He has a wide scope of research interest which include surgical techniques, 3-Dimensional (3D) printing of PSIs, medical wearable devices and stem cell therapies for spinal spondylotic changes. He is also the current Editor-in-chief of the Journal of Spine Surgery.

Being the principal of JMI, a medical design company, Mobbs is involved in the design of various surgical instruments and implants. These include tissue expansion systems, endoscopic retractors, percutaneous fusion systems, biomaterials for prostheses, integral fixation systems and instrument simplification. His designs have been implanted in over 250,000 patients worldwide over two decades.

Dr Mobbs' current research interest for medical wearables focuses on using medical wearable technologies/implants to improve health, monitor chronic illness, support postoperative recovery and eventually play a major role in assisting primary care physicians. His research team (WAGAR) published the first article on the use of wearables for objective/subjective assessment of post operative spinal patients.

== Personal life ==
Mobbs lives in the Sydney suburb of Coogee.
