= Judith Robinson-Valéry =

Australian academic (1933–2010)

Judith Robinson-Valéry FAHA
- Born: Judith Ogilvie White; 1 July 1933; Canberra, Australia
- Died: 29 June 2010 (aged 76); Sydney, Australia
- Occupation: Academic
- Writing career
- Notable works: Paul Valéry: Cahiers; Alain lecteur de Balzac et de Stendhal; L'Analyse de l'esprit dans les Cahiers de Valéry

Judith Robinson-Valéry FAHA (1 July 1933 – June 29, 2010) was the foundation professor of French and the head of the School of Western European Languages at the University of New South Wales and later a director of research at the Centre National de la Recherche Scientifique (CNRS) in Paris. She was an important scholar on the thought and creativity of the French poet, essayist and philosopher Paul Valéry.

== Early life and education ==
Robinson-Valéry was born Judith Ogilvie White on July 1, 1933 in Canberra. Her father was Harold White (later Sir Harold White), Australia's national librarian and Commonwealth parliamentary librarian for 25 years. Her mother was Elizabeth who received an MBE for her services to the aged.

After matriculating from Canberra High School at the age of fifteen, she studied at Sydney University from 1950 until 1953. She was a resident of The Women's College (at that time led by the dynamic principal Betty Archdale). In 1954 she graduated with first class honours and was awarded the university medal in French.

She undertook research for a doctorate at the Sorbonne in Paris, France. The subject was the French philosopher and moralist Alain (Émile-Auguste Chartier). She was awarded her doctorate with the highest distinction and in 1958 her thesis was published as Alain, lecteur de Balzac et de Stendhal.

She was elected in 1958 to a research fellowship at Girton College, Cambridge. In this period she commenced research on the French poet, essayist and philosopher Paul Valéry, publishing a number of articles on the latter's Cahiers (Notebooks) and, in 1963, a book on the subject entitled L'Analyse de l'esprit dans les Cahiers de Valéry, which "undertook for the first time to trace the relevance of mathematical and scientific models in Valéry’s intellectual system with reference to subjects such as time, memory, dream, poetry and ethics." That book was well received and resulted in an invitation from the publishing house Gallimard and the Centre National de la Recherche Scientifique to bring out an annotated edition of Valéry's Cahiers in the prestigious Bibliothèque de la Pléiade collection.

== Foundation professor ==
In 1963 Robinson-Valéry was appointed as the foundation professor of French and the head of the School of Western European Languages at the University of New South Wales. She was "the first woman professor in Australia to head a university department" During her time at the University programmes in German, Spanish and Russian were introduced.

She advocated "that it was necessary to produce more vivid methods of teaching French at university level" Accordingly, she inaugurated a new direction in the university level of French teaching that saw the use of French language in all French classes and the integration of three strands, French language, literature and civilization, at all levels. Audiovisual methods of teaching were introduced involving a language laboratory and a multimedia room.

In 1972 she was elected to the Australian Academy of the Humanities (AAH).

== French universities and CNRS ==
In 1974 Robinson-Valéry resigned from the University of NSW (and was succeeded there by Jean Chaussivert) and returned to France. In the years that followed she held several visiting professorships in French literature and studies (Paris X-Nanterre; Paris IV-La Sorbonne; Paul Valéry-Montpellier III). In 1982 she was named to a directorship of research at the Centre National de la Recherche Scientifique (CNRS) in Paris. She continued to pursue her research on Paul Valéry for the next twenty years, which resulted in many publications and awards. In 1987 she was appointed to the Conseil National pour la Recherche Scientifique.

== Later life ==
Having retired from the CRNS in 1998, she continued to live in Paris. In 2001, due to failing health, she returned to Sydney. In 2004 she endowed "The Judith Robinson-Valéry Scholarship" at The Women's College, Sydney University, to be awarded "to a student who is studying in a postgraduate Psychology course at the University of Sydney and residing at The Women's College". She died on 29 June 2010. Judith Robinson-Valéry's papers are held in UNSW Archives.

== Personal life ==
Robinson-Valéry was married twice. She married Dr Brian John Robinson, a radio astronomer, at the British Embassy in Paris in 1956. They had one son, Anthony Philip Robinson (Tony), who was born in 1970. They divorced in 1975. In 1976 she married Claude Valéry, the elder son of Paul Valéry.

She had three siblings:

- David Ogilvie White, Professor of Microbiology at the University of Melbourne (1967–94)
- John White, formerly chief executive of the NSW Farmers' Association
- Katharine Ogilvie West, author and former visiting scholar in communication and public policy, Canberra University.

== Awards ==
- Fellow of the Australian Academy of the Humanities, elected 1972
- Doctor of Letters honoris causa from the University of New South Wales (1987)
- Chevalier de la Légion d'Honneur (2005)

== Select bibliography ==
=== As author ===
- Alain, lecteur de Balzac et de Stendhal. Paris: Corti, 1958.
- L'Analyse de l'esprit dans les Cahiers de Valéry. Paris: Corti, 1963.
- France Today: Background to a Modern Civilization. Sydney: Novak, 1964. Jointly authored with Angus Martin.
- Rimbaud, Valéry et "l'incohérence harmonique". Paris : Lettres Modernes, 1979.
- Fonctions de l'esprit: treize savants redécouvrent Paul Valéry. Paris: Hermann, 1983.

=== As editor ===
- Paul Valéry, Cahiers, I. Edition établie, presentée et annotée par Judith Robinson. Paris: Gallimard, 1973 (Bibliothèque de la Pléiade, 242). 2 volumes.
- Paul Valéry, Cahiers. Edition établie, presentée et annotée par Judith Robinson. Paris: Gallimard, 1988 (Bibliothèque de la Pléiade, 242). 2 volumes.
- Paul Valéry, Cahiers, 1894-1914. Edition intégrale établie, présentée et annotée sous la co-responsabilité de Nicole Celeyrette-Pietri et Judith Robinson-Valéry Paris: Gallimard, 1988 (Collection blanche). Jointly edited with Nicole Celeyrette-Pietri.
