= Xuemin Lin =

Xuemin Lin (林学民) is a computer scientist, a chair professor at Shanghai Jiaotong University, and formerly Scientia Professor in the School of Computer Science and Engineering at the University of New South Wales. He is a member of Academia Europaea, elected in 2022. He was named Fellow of the Institute of Electrical and Electronics Engineers (IEEE) in 2016 for contributions to algorithmic paradigms for database technology.
