= Vassilios Agelidis =

Danish academic

Vassilios G. Agelidis is a professor at the Technical University of Denmark in Lyngby, Copenhagen. He previously held the same position at the University of New South Wales, Sydney. He was named Fellow of the Institute of Electrical and Electronics Engineers (IEEE) in 2016 for contributions to power electronics, renewable energy conversion and integration with electricity grid. He is also a fellow of the Institute of Engineering and Technology.
