= Anne Ngu =

Australian-American computer scientist

Anne Hee Hiong Ngu is an Australian-American computer scientist known for her research on middleware and quality of service for web services and the Internet of things. She is a professor of computer science at Texas State University.

== Education and career ==
Ngu was educated at the University of Western Australia, where she earned bachelor's degrees in science and in computer science (with honours) in 1981 and 1982, and completed her Ph.D. in computer science in 1990. She became a lecturer and then senior lecturer at the University of New South Wales, beginning in 1992 and retaining a position there as an adjunct associate professor until 2006. In the meantime, in 2002, she moved to Texas State University in 2002, as an associate professor of computer science, and was promoted to full professor in 2010.

== Recognition ==
Ngu was one of the 2013 winners of the Mentoring Award for Undergraduate Research of the National Center for Women & Information Technology. Texas State University gave her their Presidential Distinction Award in Services in 2014 and again in 2017.
