= ARC Centre of Excellence in Population Ageing Research =

Centre for Population Ageing Research
- Abbreviation: CEPAR
- Formation: 2011
- Headquarters: University of New South Wales
- Leader: John Piggott
- Website: cepar.edu.au

The Centre for Population Ageing Research (CEPAR) is a collaboration of leading researchers in population ageing, based within the UNSW Business School. CEPAR was established in 2011. It is based at the University of New South Wales. CEPAR was the first social science centre to receive Centre of Excellence funding.

== History ==
The centre was established in 2011, funded primarily by an initial seven-year grant from the Australian Research Council (ARC), with support from collaborating universities, partner organisations and the NSW government. CEPAR was the first social science centre to receive Centre of Excellence funding.

From 2011 to 2017 it focused on five research areas: Causes & Consequences of Demographic Change; Cognition & Decision Making; Resources in Retirement: Covers policy and practice in delivering resources in retirement; Ageing Well & Productively; Health & Aged Care and Ageing in Asia & its Impact on Australia.

CEPAR was successful in securing funding for an additional seven-year term from 2017 to 2024 to undertake a new research program.

Since early 2025, CEPAR's research and two-way engagement program has been re-established as a research centre within the UNSW Business School, led by Centre Director Scientia Professor John Piggott AO.

== Description ==
The Centre is based at the University of New South Wales.

As of 2016, it was the only Centre of Excellence to be hosted by a Business School in Australia.

With a commitment to advancing multidisciplinary research on population ageing, CEPAR has established itself as a leader in research designed to provide an evidence base to inform policy formulation related to demographic change, and product development and community awareness reacted to demographic change.

== Current research program ==
As of 2025, CEPAR's research program informs new and more coherent whole-of-government approaches to sustainable social policy development, and to support complementary private provision of post-retirement support. These will help guide policy line departments, financial services providers, regulators and individuals in their life course decision-making and risk management. The four new research streams are:

- Economy wide modelling of retirement and later life social protection policies
- Household decision-making, especially health and finances, for and in old age
- Modelling and managing mortality, morbidity, and aged care risks in retirement
- Australia’s engagement with emerging Asia & Pacific economies: Responding to the impact of regional ageing

== ARC Centre of Excellence CEPAR research program ==
From 2017 to 2024, CEPAR's research program was assembled into four interconnected research streams which draw on expertise from actuarial science, demography, economics, epidemiology, psychology, and sociology:

- Macro-demographic dynamics & population ageing policy
- Decision making, expectations and cognitive ageing
- Organisations and the mature workforce
- Sustainable well-being in later life

== Collaborators ==
From 2017 to 2024, the ARC Centre of Excellence CEPAR was a collaboration between academia, government and industry, involving five Australian universities: the University of New South Wales (headquarters), the Australian National University, Curtin University, the University of Melbourne and the University of Sydney. The centre also has close connections with industry leaders and government agencies. As of 2019 CEPAR had ~180 researchers.

Collaborating partner organisations included the University of Manchester, the University of Pennsylvania, the Wharton School of the University of Pennsylvania, the Australian Government Departments of Social Services, Foreign Affairs and Trade, Health and Treasury, NSW Treasury, the Australian Human Rights Commission, Reserve Bank of Australia, Safe Work Australia, Willis Towers Watson, PwC, Medibank, National Australia Bank and The World Bank.

The ARC Centre of Excellence CEPAR research program was led by 12 chief investigators and three partner investigators from 2017 to 2024.
