= Shirley Scott (international law academic) =

Australian academic in international law

Shirley V. Scott is an Australian academic in international law. She is professor of international law and international relations and was Head of School at the School of Humanities and Social Sciences at the University of New South Wales Canberra at the Australian Defence Force Academy (ADFA).

Scott was a former president of the Asian Society of International Law and was the first Australian to hold the position. Prior to becoming president, Scott was a member of the Advisory Council of AsianSIL. Scott formerly held the position of chair of the International Law Section of the International Studies Association (ISA) and is also co-director of the Scientia Academy at UNSW Sydney.

== Contribution to academic scholarship ==
Scott is a leading scholar in the fields of international law and international relations and has published widely, including in journals such as International Theory, European Journal of International Relations, European Journal of International Law, Review of International Studies, and Australian Journal of International Affairs.

Scott has published over ten books, including The Political Interpretation of Multilateral Treaties, International Law, US Power: The United States’ Quest for Legal Security, International Law in World Politics: An Introduction, Climate Change and the UN Security Council (with Charlotte Ku), Norm Antipreneurs and the Politics of Resistance to Global Normative Change (with Alan Bloomfield), and International Law in the Era of Climate Change (with Rosemary Rayfuse).
