= Wenjie Zhang =

Australian academic

Wenjie Zhang is a Professor and Head of the Data and Knowledge Research Group within the School of Computer Science and Engineering, the University of New South Wales (UNSW Sydney). Her most notable breakthrough is in the area of optimization strategies to process computationally complex large graphs. Her work is among the first to identify that graph complexity relies only on the small size of the query input and output rather than the size of the whole data graph, which could be a web scale, such as in social media networks. Her recent research focuses on algorithms, indexes, and systems in large scale graphs and their applications especially in social network analysis.

== Career, awards and achievements ==
Zhang received her PhD degree in computer science and engineering in 2009 from UNSW, titled "Efficiently and effectively processing probabilistic queries on uncertain data". In 2011 she won an Australian Research Council (ARC) Early Career Researcher Award.

In 2019, she received the Chris Wallace Award in recognition of her contributions to large-scale graph data processing. The result was a breakthrough, and published in major journals and recognized by both academia and the industry database community. Zhang has been awarded three ARC Discovery grants for this work between 2015-2018 and was recently listed in The Australian as Australia’s Research Field Leader in Databases and Information Systems.

Zhang is an Associate Editor for IEEE Transactions on Knowledge and Data Engineering (TKDE), Chief Investigator of RIIS, an industry and ARC funded research and innovation hub for smart infrastructure and was awarded a prestigious ARC Discovery Future Fellowship in 2021.

Between 2012 and 2022, Zhang has won six rounds of Australian National Competitive Grants, totalling over AUD 2.2M.

She is member of the Data Sharing Committee for ACS, the professional association for Australia's technology sector.

Zhang has participated as Organizing Committee or Program Committee Chair for numerous conferences, including area chair for International Conference on Very Large Data Bases 2022, International Conference on Data Engineering 2019 and International Conference on Information and Knowledge Management 2015, and a Program Chair member for more than 60 international conferences and workshops.

In her career to 2022, she has authored or co-authored over 200 peer reviewed publications in top journals such as IEEE Transactions on Knowledge and Data Engineering, ACM Transactions on Database Systems, The International Journal on Very Large Data Bases, Special Interest Group on Management of Data and the International Conference on Data Engineering.
