= John Piggott (economist) =

Australian economist

Academic background
- Education: University of London

Academic work
- Discipline: Economics of Population Ageing; Economics of Pensions, Retirement, and Ageing; Public Finance
- Institutions: UNSW Business School, CEPAR

John Reginald Piggott AO FASSA is an Australian economist. He is the Director of the UNSW Centre for Population Ageing Research (CEPAR) at the University of New South Wales, Australia, where he is Scientia Professor of Economics. He is a Fellow of the Academy of the Social Sciences in Australia.

== Education and career ==
John Piggott graduated with a PhD in Economics from the University of London. He has held continuous full-time academic appointments since graduation. He was Director of the ARC Centre of Excellence in Population Ageing Research (CEPAR) from 2011-2024 and is Scientia Professor of Economics at the University of New South Wales, Australia. He now leads the UNSW Centre for Population Ageing Research within the UNSW Business School.

In 2011, he was awarded a UNSW Scientia Professorship in recognition of his international research stature. In that same year he was awarded an Australian Research Council (ARC) Professorial Fellowship and began his term as the Director of CEPAR. He was Visiting Scholar with the Wharton School of the University of Pennsylvania from 2008 to 2010.

He has held a range of academic management positions at UNSW Sydney, including two terms as Head of the School of Economics, and seven years as Associate Dean Research.

His Australian policy experience includes membership of both the Henry Tax Review Panel and the Ministerial Superannuation Advisory Committee. Internationally, he worked for nearly a decade with the Japanese Government on pension and ageing issues. John Piggott has been a consultant to several foreign governments on pension issues, including Russia and Indonesia.

In 2018/2019, John Piggott was appointed as a cochair of the Think20 (T20) Task Force on Aging Population during Japan's G20 Presidency, helping G20 nations decide how they will cope with ageing populations.

== Research contributions ==
John Piggott has a long-standing interest in the economics of population ageing, retirement and pension economics and finance. His publications include more than 100 journal articles and chapters in books.

He has also co-authored two books, Forced Saving and UK Tax Policy and Applied General Equilibrium Analysis, both published by Cambridge University Press. In 2016 and 2018, he co-edited three volumes on ageing: Elsevier's Handbook of the Economics of Population Ageing, Population Ageing and Australia's Future, published by the Academy of Social Sciences in Australia (ASSA) and ANU Press, and The Taxation of Pensions, published by MIT Press.

== Awards and honours ==
- Fellow of the Academy of Social Sciences in Australia (FASSA) (1992)
- ARC Australian Professorial Fellow (2011-2015)
- UNSW Scientia Professorship (2011)
- UNSW Business School Staff Excellence Global Impact Award (2020)
- Officer of the Order of Australia (2020)
- UNSW Business School Staff Excellence Lifetime Achievement Award for Impact (2024)
