= Suzanne Eggins =

Australian linguist

Suzanne Eggins is an Australian linguist who is an Honorary Fellow at Australian National University (ANU), associated with the ANU Institute for Communication in Health Care. Eggins is the author of a best selling introduction to systemic functional linguistics and she is known for her extensive work on critical linguistic analysis of spontaneous interactions in informal and institutional healthcare settings.

== Biography ==
Suzanne Eggins was born in Mansfield, Nottinghamshire UK, to Australian parents living and working in the UK at the time. After her family returned to Australia, she grew up in Inverell, New South Wales and then moved to Sydney. After completing her Bachelor of Arts, Honours (first class) at the University of Sydney in 1982, she started a master's degree in linguistics on ergativity in English under the supervision of Michael Halliday. She decided to defer this admission when she was awarded a scholarship from the French government. From September 1983 to June 1985, she studied at the Université de Nancy II (now Université de Lorraine), completing a Maîtrise des Sciences du Langage and a Diplôme des Etudes Approfondies, under the direction of Philip Riley and Henri Holec. Upon returning to Australia in mid-1985, she resumed her deferred postgraduate degree (converted to a PhD) under the supervision of Michael Halliday and J. R. Martin at the University of Sydney. In 1986/1987, Eggins was asked to lecture the course ‘Language as Content’ for students preparing to study the MA in Applied Linguistics at the University of Sydney and these lectures formed the basis of the first edition of her book 'An Introduction to Systemic Functional Linguistics' in 1994. She received her PhD in 1991 and the title of her thesis was 'Keeping the conversation going: A systemic-functional analysis of conversational structure in casual sustained talk'.

From 1992 to 2006, Eggins was an academic at the University of New South Wales (UNSW) School of English (now a part of UNSW School of the Arts and Media), with a period as a Head of School (2001–2003). During this time, she developed a number of courses focusing on systemic functional linguistics, text analysis, children's literature and literacy, and professional writing. In 2005, she also formalised her interests in editing, literary studies and writing by completing a Master of Arts in professional communication at Deakin University. From 2007 to 2009, she was the Editor of The School Magazine, which is a suite of illustrated literary magazines for children widely distributed throughout primary schools across Australia. Before accepting a role of an Honorary Fellow at Australian National University in 2017, she had spent seven years at The University of Technology Sydney as a Research Fellow involved in a national study of clinical handover communication led by Prof Diana Slade and funded by Australian Research Council.

== Contributions to linguistics ==
=== An Introduction to Systemic Functional Linguistics ===
To cater for the needs of undergraduate UNSW students coming from educational rather than linguistic backgrounds, Suzanne Eggins converted her lecture notes into a textbook introducing systemic functional linguistics. The first edition closely followed Michael Halliday's 'Introduction to Functional Grammar' (IFG) and was intended to contextualise it within social functional linguistic theory. Furthermore, it aimed to provide analysed examples of ‘real texts’, rather than the short clause-length examples that students encountered in Halliday's IFG. The book concentrated on clause-level grammar and grammar's interface with social life through chapters on genre, register and cohesion. When first published, the 'Introduction to Systemic Functional Linguistics was one of only two or three introductory books on systemic functional linguistics available. It was critically acclaimed, quickly becoming a bestseller. In his book review for the 'Functions of Language' journal, Martin Davis said, "I would put a copy [of this textbook] in the hands of every teacher in training in the UK - not just teachers of English and not teachers only in schools: university teachers in English-speaking institutions world-wide, or whatever discipline, would profit greatly from it." The second edition of the book was published in 2004 and it includes a chapter on the clause complex and draws on a wider variety of textual examples, including literary texts and writing by children. It also reflects a more ‘critical’ approach to applying functional grammar that had been developing as a result of the rise of Norman Fairclough’s work on Critical Discourse Analysis.

=== Analysing casual conversation ===
Eggins is the co-author of the book 'Analysing Casual Conversation' Using casual conversation from workplaces and social settings, the book offers the first critical and theorised account of conversation within systemic functional linguistics and provides practical analytical tools for researchers working on spoken interaction. According to Suzan Feez, "the insights contained in the material are made available both for theoretical pursuit within the academy and for more practical application in the classroom."

=== Healthcare communication ===
As National Linguist on the ARC-funded project ‘Effective Communication in Clinical Handover’, Eggins carried out linguistic ethnographic fieldwork at a metropolitan public hospital and advised research teams in other states on the analysis and interpretation of language data. With Diane Slade, she observed and recorded hundreds of hours of nursing and medical clinical handovers. Afterwards, they published widely on the communication patterns and developed training courses for nurses in ‘better bedside handovers’ that have been delivered to several hundred nurses at Canberra Hospital. This training has since been adapted and delivered at hospitals in Hong Kong and elsewhere in Australia.

== Selected publications ==
=== Books ===
- Eggins, S. (2004). An introduction to systemic functional linguistics. (2nd ed.). London: Continuum.
- Eggins, S. & Slade, D. (2005). Analysing Casual Conversation. Equinox: London.
- Eggins, S., Slade, D. & Geddes, F. (Eds.) (2016). Effective Communication in Clinical Handover. Boston: Mouton de Groyter.

=== Book chapters ===
- Eggins, S. (2016). As a doctor you're always learning: Discourse strategies senior clinicians use to teach junior clinicians on the job. in H. de Silva Joyce (ed.) Language at Work: Analysing Language Use In Work, Education, Medical and Museum Contexts. Newcastle upon Tyne, UK: Cambridge Scholars.
- Eggins, S. (2014). Hospital humour: patient-initiated humour as resistance to clinical discourse. In E. Stracke (ed.) Intersections: Applied Linguistics as a Meeting Place. Newcastle upon Tyne, UK: Cambridge Scholars Publishing.
- Eggins, S. (2000). Researching Everyday Talk in L. Unsworth (ed.) Researching Language in Schools and Communities. London: Cassell.
