= Vanessa Lemm =

Philosopher

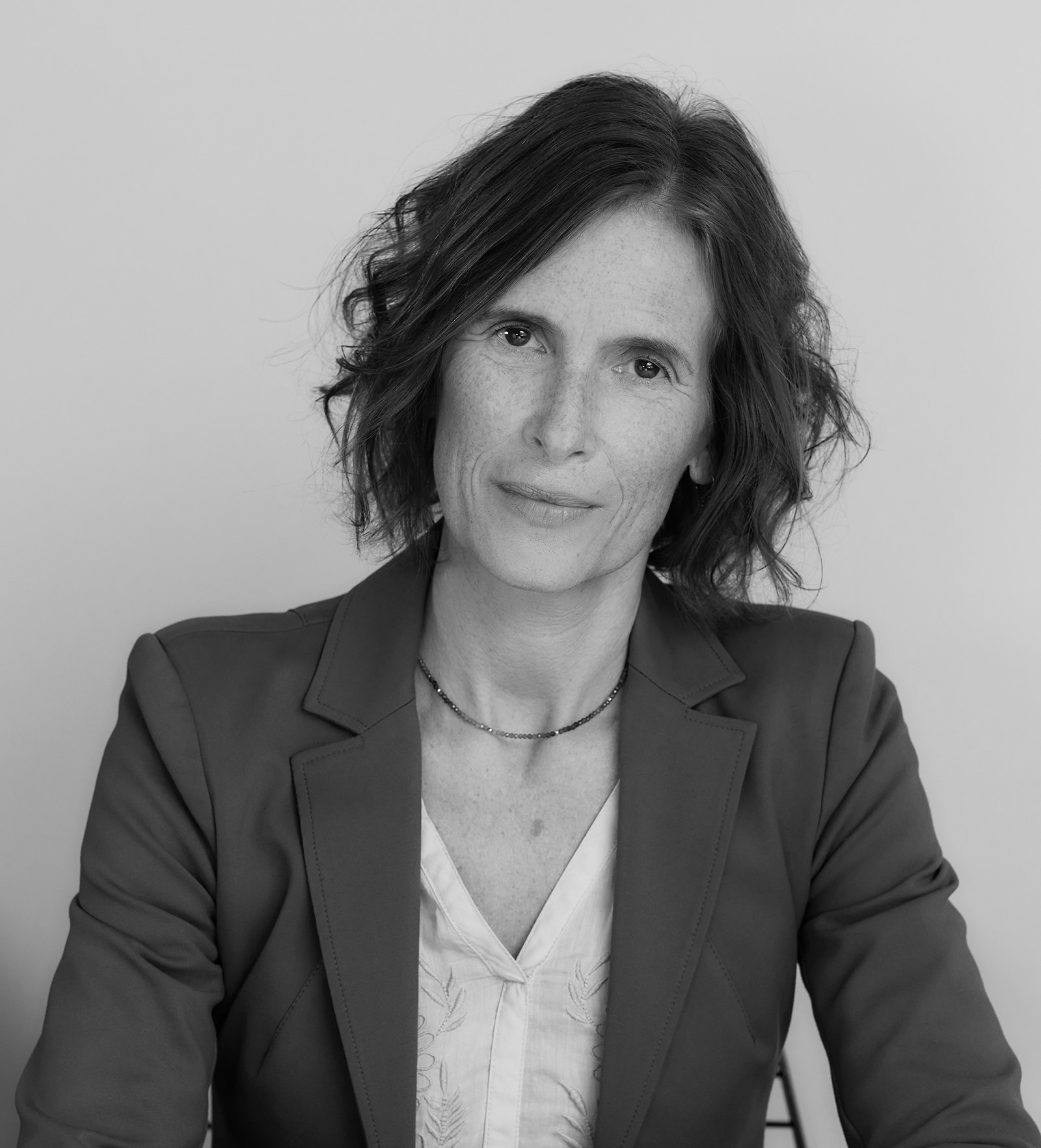
- Professor Vanessa Lemm

Personal details
- Citizenship: Germany and Australia
- Spouse: Miguel Vatter

Vanessa Lemm

Philosophical work
- Era: Contemporary philosophy
- Region: Western philosophy
- School: Continental
- Main interests: Poststructuralism; Political Philosophy; Hermeneutics

Vanessa Lemm FRSN is provost and deputy vice-chancellor at the University of Greenwich, United Kingdom. She was appointed in 2024. Lemm was previously vice-president and executive dean of the College of Humanities, Arts and Social Sciences at Flinders University. She is chief editor of the journal Nietzsche Studien, and has published on the topics of Friedrich Nietzsche and Michel Foucault. She was the executive dean of the Faculty of Arts and Education at Deakin University (2021-2022).

== Career ==
Before moving to Australia, Lemm was Director of the Institute of Humanities at the Diego Portales University in Santiago de Chile and DAAD Visiting Professor at the Institute for Philosophy at the University of Potsdam, Germany.

At the University of New South Wales she was professor of philosophy and head of the School of Humanities and Languages for more than four years. During this time she was elected Fellow of the Royal Society of New South Wales (FRSN).

== Bibliography ==
- Lemm V; Ulrich A Nietzsche's Natures (De Gruyter 2024)
- Lemm V; Vatter M The Viral Politics of Covid-19: Nature, Home and Planetary Health (Palgrave Macmillan 2022)
- Lemm V; Homo Natura: Nietzsche, Philosophical Anthropology and Biopolitics (EUP, 2020)
- Lemm V; Vatter M, (eds.), 2014, The Government of Life: Foucault, Biopolitics and Neoliberalism, Fordham University Press, New York
- Lemm V, 2013, Nietzsche y el pensamiento político contemporáneo, Fondo de Cultura Económica, Santiago de Chile
- Lemm V, 2012, Nietzsches Philosophie des Tieres, Diaphanes Verlag, Berlin/Zürich
- Lemm V, (ed.), 2010, Michel Foucault: neoliberalismo y biopolítica, Ediciones Universidad Diego Portales, Santiago de Chile
- Lemm V; Ormeño J, (eds.), 2010, Hegel, pensador de la actualidad, Ediciones Universidad Diego Portales, Santiago de Chile
- Lemm V, 2009, Nietzsche's Animal Philosophy: Culture, Politics and the Animality of the Human Being, Fordham University Press, New York

== See also ==
- Biopolitics
