= George Poonkhin Khut =

Australian artist

George Poonkhin Khut, (b. 1969) is an Australian artist, academic and interaction-designer working across the fields of electronic art, design and health, at UNSW Art & Design, University of New South Wales in Australia.

Knut was an artist in residence at National Portrait Gallery (Australia) in 2016.

In 2012, Khut was honored with the Queensland Art Gallery | Gallery of Modern Art National New Media Art Award for his interactive artwork controlled by heart rate.
