= List of University of New South Wales alumni =

This is a list of University of New South Wales alumni.

== Academia ==
- Dijana Alić, architect and academic
- Michael Barber, mathematician, physicist and vice-chancellor of Flinders University 2008–2014 (Mathematics)
- Sharon Beder, arts academic (Engineering)
- Glyn Davis, current vice-chancellor of University of Melbourne (Political science)
- John Deeble, architect of Medicare Australia
- Rosalyn Diprose, philosopher and UNSW academic (Philosophy)
- Ross Fitzgerald AM, academic, historian, novelist, secularist, and political commentator (PhD Politics)
- Michael Fullilove, public and international policy academic, executive director of the Lowy Institute for International Policy (Arts/Law)
- David Gonski AC, prominent businessman, chancellor of UNSW Sydney (Commerce/LLB)
- O. K. Harsh, computer scientist, physicist, current honorary pro-chancellor (addl) of Glocal University
- Gernot Heiser, John Lions chair and computer scientist
- Atiqul Islam, accountant and current vice-chancellor of North South University, Bangladesh (Commerce)
- Koo Tsai Kee, Singaporean academic and former politician (Surveying)
- Chandran Kukathas, Malaysian-born Australian political theorist and academic (MA, Politics)
- Gareth Peters, endowed chair professor at the University of California, Santa Barbara (Statistics)
- Jane Stapleton, academic and master at Christ's College, Cambridge
- Tony Vinson, emeritus professor, Education and Social Work
- Toby Walsh, computer scientist and artificial intelligence expert

== Business ==
- Rodney Adler, former FAI Insurance chief executive
- Brad Banducci, CEO of Woolworths Group
- Cheryl Bart AO, lawyer, company director and mountain climber (Commerce/LLB 1986)
- Mark Bouris, chairman of Yellow Brick Road and television personality
- Mike Cannon-Brookes, entrepreneur, billionaire, and co-CEO of the software company Atlassian (Information Science)
- Frank Cicutto, CEO of National Australia Bank (Commerce)
- Paul Clitheroe AM, television presenter and businessman (Arts)
- Matt Comyn, CEO of Commonwealth Bank
- Roger Corbett AO, former chairman of the Reserve Bank of Australia, former CEO of Woolworths (Commerce)
- Douglas Daft AC, prominent Australian and US business executive who served as CEO of The Coca-Cola Company 1999–2004; now a global non-executive director (Dipl.Admin)
- Satyajit Das, banker, author and academic (Law)
- John De Margheriti, software developer and entrepreneur, founding father of Australia's video games industry (Electrical engineering)
- Michael Easson AM, businessman and former union leader (Politics/History)
- Richard Farleigh, private investor (Economics)
- Scott Farquhar, entrepreneur, billionaire, and co-CEO of the software company Atlassian (Arts/Science)
- David Gonski AC, prominent businessman, Chancellor of UNSW Sydney (Commerce/LLB)
- John M. Green, deputy chairman of QBE Insurance; co-founder of Pantera Press; author
- Catherine Harris AO, PSM, co-founder and chairman of Harris Farm Markets and company director (Commerce)
- Philip Hercus, founder of International Catamaran Designs (Engineering)
- Grant King, managing director, Origin Energy (Engineering)
- David Lowy, non-executive deputy chairman of the Westfield Group
- Steven Lowy, group managing director of the Westfield Group
- Donald McDonald, former chairman of Australian Broadcasting Corporation (ABC)
- Warwick McKibbin, former member of board of directors of the Reserve Bank of Australia; economist
- John Niland, director of Macquarie Group; chairman of Centennial Park and Moore Park Trust; former vice-chancellor of UNSW Sydney
- John Prescott, former CEO of BHP
- Gregory G. Rose, principal engineer at Qualcomm (Engineering)
- George Savvides, managing director, Medibank Private (Engineering)
- Jillian Segal, non-executive director, National Australia Bank; deputy chancellor of UNSW Sydney (Law)
- Gai Waterhouse, horse trainer and businesswoman
- Shemara Wikramanayake, CEO of Macquarie Group

== Community activism ==
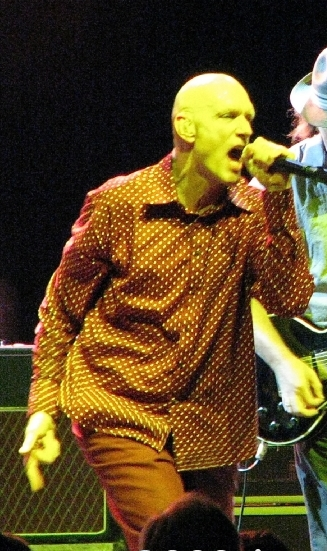
Peter Garrett, lead singer of Midnight Oil and former politician

- Sharan Burrow, global union leader (Education)
- Eva Cox AO, writer, feminist, sociologist, social commentator and activist (Sociology)
- Louise Crossley, scientist and environmental activist (PhD)
- Karen Dawn, American animal rights and welfare advocate and writer (Psychology)
- Graeme Dunstan, cultural and political activist (Engineering)
- Tim Flannery, mammalogist, palaeontologist, environmentalist and global warming activist; 2007 Australian of the Year (PhD Palaeontology)
- Peter Garrett, musician, social activist, former politician (LLB 1977)
- Heinz Harant, student activist and founder of the university's alumni association (Electrical engineering (Hons) 1955)
- Cynthia Houniuhi, environmental activist and president of Pacific Island Students Fighting Climate Change
- Betty Kitchener AM, Australian mental health educator and consumer advocate

== Government ==
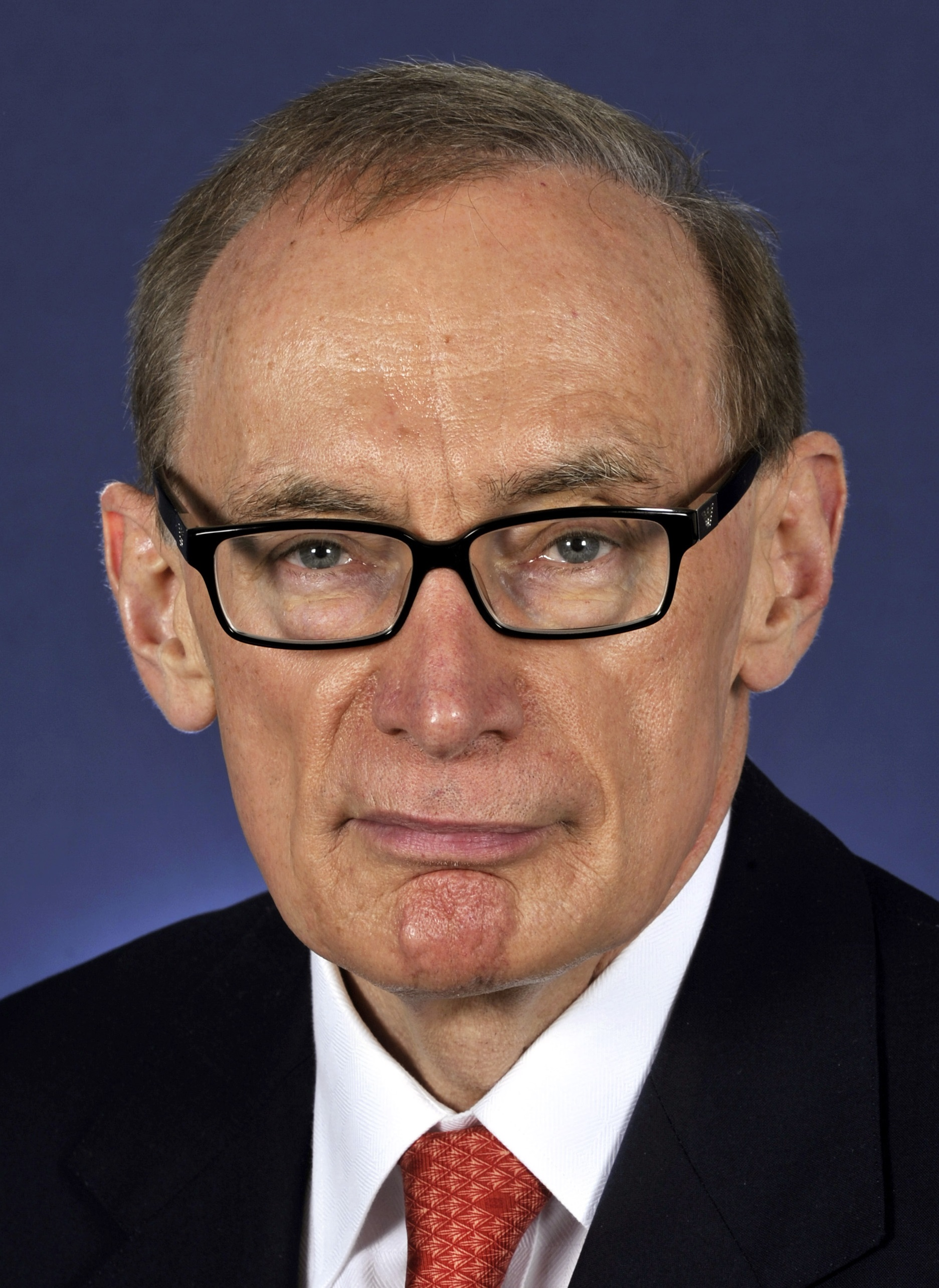
Bob Carr, former foreign minister of Australia

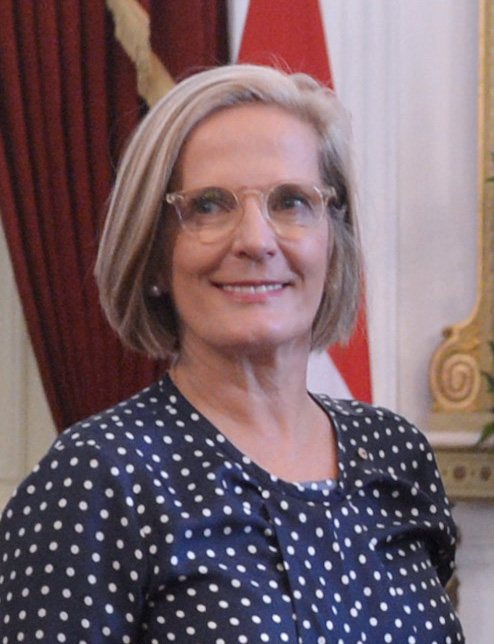
Lucy Turnbull, lord mayor of Sydney 2003–2004

=== Prime ministers ===
- Scott Morrison, former member for Cook and 30th prime minister of Australia

=== State premiers ===
- Gladys Berejiklian, former premier of New South Wales (Commerce)
- Bob Carr, former premier of New South Wales, former federal minister for foreign affairs, former politician, author (Arts)
- Stephen Hatton, former chief minister of the Northern Territory
- Campbell Newman, former premier of Queensland, former politician

=== Federal politicians ===
- Larry Anthony, former politician (Commerce)
- Mark Arbib, former politician (Arts)
- Vicki Bourne, former politician (Science)
- Alan Cadman, former politician (Agriculture)
- Bob Carr, former minister for foreign affairs, former premier of New South Wales, former politician, author (Arts)
- Jason Clare, current member for Blaxland, former minister for home affairs and former minister for defence materiel (Arts/Law)
- David Coleman, former member for Banks (Arts/Law)
- Greg Combet, former politician and trade unionist (Engineering)
- Jason Falinski, former member for Mackellar (MBA)
- Mehreen Faruqi, current senator for New South Wales and former member of the NSW Legislative Council (Environmental Engineering)
- David Fawcett, current senator for South Australia and former Army officer (Science)
- Michael Forshaw, former politician (Law)
- Peter Garrett AM, musician, social activist, former politician (LLB 1977)
- Andrew Hastie, current member for Canning, retired Army officer
- Michael Hatton, former politician (Arts)
- Mike Kelly AO, current member for Eden-Monaro, retired Australian Army officer (PhD Law)
- Craig Laundy, former member for Reid (Economics)
- Michael Lee, former politician (Electrical Engineering)
- Julian Leeser, current member for Berowra (LLB)
- Sussan Ley, former member for Farrer, former Federal Oppositions leader, former leader of the Liberal Party
- Ted Mack, former politician (Architecture)
- Louise Markus, former politician (Arts)
- Stephen Mutch, former politician (LLB)
- Gary Nairn, former politician
- Kerry Nettle, former politician
- Andrew Nikolic, former politician and retired Army officer (Management)
- Melissa Parke, former United Nations senior lawyer, former politician (Law)
- Marise Payne, former senator for New South Wales and former Minister for Defence
- Lee Rhiannon, former senator for New South Wales and former member of the NSW Legislative Council (Science)
- Stuart Robert, former member for Fadden, former Army officer (Arts)

=== Australian state and territory politicians ===
- Jack Beale, former politician (Engineering)
- Stephen Bromhead, former member for Myall Lakes (M.Law)
- Arthur Chesterfield-Evans, former member of the NSW Legislative Council (Science)
- Ian Cohen, former member of the NSW Legislative Council (Arts/DipEd)
- Kevin Conolly, current member for Riverstone (Arts)
- Paul Crittenden, former member for Wyong (Commerce)
- Mehreen Faruqi, former member of the NSW Legislative Council and current senator for New South Wales (Environmental Engineering)
- Luke Foley, former member for Auburn and NSW leader of the Opposition (Arts)
- Bryce Gaudry, former politician and teacher (Arts)
- Alex Greenwich, current member for Sydney (Arts)
- Sylvia Hale, former member of the NSW Legislative Council (LLB 1998)
- Brad Hazzard, former member for Wakehurst (Law)
- Courtney Houssos, current member of the NSW Legislative Council (Arts)
- Andrew Humpherson, former member for Davidson (Chemical Engineering)
- Trevor Khan, current member of the NSW Legislative Council (LLB/B.Juris.)
- Sonya Kilkenny, current member for Carrum in the Victorian Legislative Assembly (BA/LLB 1995)
- Ernie Page, former politician
- Doug Parkinson, former politician in Tasmania
- Eleni Petinos, member for Miranda (LLB 2011)
- Lee Rhiannon, former member of the NSW Legislative Council and current senator for New South Wales (Science)
- Eric Roozendaal, former treasurer of New South Wales and former politician (Law)
- Penny Sharpe, current member of the NSW Legislative Council (Food Technology)
- Gabrielle Upton, current member for Vaucluse (Arts/Law)

==== International politicians ====
- Jackie Chan, former member of the Legislative Council of Hong Kong (Engineering)
- Andrew Cheng, Hong Kong politician, councillor of Legislative Council of Hong Kong (Law)
- Chua Tian Chang, Malaysian politician, current member of Parliament for the Batu constituency (Philosophy)
- Emil Dardak, vice governor of East Java
- Mehdi Ghazanfari, former Iranian politician
- Meutya Hafid, Indonesian politician, member of People's Representative Council, former journalist
- Foo Mee Har, Singaporean politician, member of Parliament for the West Coast Group constituency (Science)
- Koo Tsai Kee, former Singaporean politician and academic (Surveying)
- Aiyaz Sayed-Khaiyum, Fijian politician and current attorney general of Fiji (LLB)
- Jeremy Tam, councillor of Legislative Council of Hong Kong, airline pilot (Engineering)
- Mah Bow Tan, minister for National Development of Singapore

==== Australian local government politicians ====
- Kathryn Greiner AO, former alderman of the City of Sydney and social advocate (Social Work)
- Lucy Turnbull, former lord mayor of Sydney (MBA)

=== Public servants ===
- Michele Bruniges AM, current secretary of the Department of Education and Training (Education)
- Elizabeth Broderick, former Australian sex discrimination commissioner (Law)
- Ian Campbell AO, PSM, former secretary of the Department of Veterans' Affairs (Economics)
- Jeff Harmer AO, former secretary of the Department of Families, Housing, Community Services and Indigenous Affairs (BA (Hons), DipEd, PhD)
- Ken Henry AC, economist and former secretary of The Treasury (Economics)
- John Holloway, former diplomat and public servant (Arts)
- Frank Howarth PSM, former director of the Australian Museum (MSc Soc)
- Robyn Kruk AM, former secretary of the Department of the Environment, Water, Heritage and the Arts, director-general of the NSW Department of Premier and Cabinet (Science [Honours])
- Patrick Lawless, Australian diplomat, current ambassador to Brazil (LLB)
- Damien Miller, Australian diplomat, current ambassador to Denmark, Norway and Iceland (Arts/Law)
- Anne-Marie Schwirtlich AM, director-general of the National Library of Australia

=== Other public figures ===
- Bruce Hawker, political pundit, political writer, political consultant, political advisor (LLB)
- Janette Howard, spouse of the 25th Prime Minister of Australia, John Howard (Arts)

== Humanities ==
=== Architecture ===
- Philip Cox, architect and entrepreneur, founder of COX Architects (Science)
- Richard Johnson AO, MBE, architect, best known as the creator of some of the most important and iconic Australian cultural buildings and spaces (Architecture, 1969)

=== Arts ===
- Del Kathryn Barton, visual artist
- Matt Carroll, Australian film and television producer
- Queenie Chan, Chinese-Australian comic artist (Computer Programming)
- Barbara Cleveland, Australian contemporary performance artist
- Judith Clingan AM, composer, conductor, performer and music educator
- Adam Cullen, visual artist (Fine Arts)
- John Davis, documentary filmmaker, mountaineer, television producer, chemical engineer (Science)
- Marta Dusseldorp, actor (Film/Theatre)
- Anne Ferran, photographer (Fine Arts)
- David Fung, concert pianist (MB BS)
- Francis Giacco, visual artist (Architecture)
- Shaun Gladwell, visual artist
- Gordon Hanley, visual artist
- Noel Hodda, actor, writer, dramaturge, director and teacher (Acting)
- Frank Howarth, geologist, Director of the Australian Museum
- Byron Kennedy, film producer
- Amber Lawrence, singer, songwriter
- Stephanie Lemelin, Canadian actress
- Lenka, born Lenka Kripac, singer
- Yaron Lifschitz, theatre director
- George Miller, movie producer, television screenwriter, producer and director of Happy Feet
- John Misto, playwright and screenwriter
- Gregory Charles Rivers, Hong Kong actor
- Emile Sherman, Oscar winner, film producer (Arts/Law)
- Glenn Sorensen, Australia-born, Sweden artist
- Rebel Wilson, actress, writer, and producer (Arts/LLB 2009)

=== History ===
- John Blaxland, Australian historian, academic, and former Australian Army officer (Arts)
- Tim Cook CM, Canadian military historian and author (PhD)
- Jeffrey Grey, former Australian military historian and academic (PhD Military history)
- David Horner AM, Australian military historian and academic (M.Arts [Honours])

=== Journalism ===
- Bettina Arndt, sex therapist and journalist
- Monica Attard OAM, award-winning journalist and Australian Broadcasting Corporation host (LLB)
- Richard Carleton, television journalist (Commerce)
- Allan Hogan, investigative journalist and television producer (Commerce)
- Craig James, economic journalist and economist, currently chief economist with Commsec (Commerce/Economics)
- Debbie Kruger, Australian music journalist and pop-culture writer (BA/MA)
- Jordan Shanks, political commentator

=== Literature, writing and poetry ===
- Jack Bedson, writer, children's author, poet and academic librarian
- Larissa Behrendt, Aboriginal writer and academic (LLB/B.Juri 1992)
- Alex Buzo, pioneer playwright
- Melissa Chiu, museum director, curator writer
- Tim Cook, historian and author
- Michael Dransfield, poet
- Suzanne Falkiner, writer (Arts)
- Susanne Gervay, author of young adult fiction (Education)
- John M. Green, author and publisher
- Anita Heiss, author, presenter and commentator (Arts/History)
- Tristan Jepson, comedic writer (LLB)
- Drusilla Modjeska, writer
- Matthew Reilly, author (Law)
- Pamela Stephenson, comedian/writer
- Natalie Tran, producer, actress, comedian, writer
- Rebel Wilson, actress, comedian and writer (Law)
- Markus Zusak, writer

=== Philosophy ===
- Khosrow Bagheri, Iranian philosopher
- Rosalyn Diprose, Australian philosopher and academic (Philosophy)
- Moira Gatens, Australian academic

=== Law ===
==== Judges and magistrates ====
- Bob Bellear, Australia's first indigenous District Court judge (LLB 1978)
- Annabelle Bennett AO, SC, chancellor of Bond University and former Federal Court judge (LLB)
- Chris Craigie SC, District Court judge and former director of public prosecutions
- Ros Croucher AM, lawyer and academic, incoming president of the Australian Human Rights Commission (PhD Legal history)
- Karin Emerton, Victorian Supreme Court judge (LLB)
- Anna Katzmann, current Federal Court judge (LLB)
- Megan Latham, current Supreme Court of New South Wales judge (BA/LLB 1979)
- Robert McClelland, Family Court judge and former commonwealth attorney-general (BA/LLB 1981)
- Anthony Meagher, current judge of the Court of Appeal of the Supreme Court of New South Wales (Commerce/LLB)
- Helen Murrell SC, chief justice of the Supreme Court of the Australian Capital Territory
- Matthew Myers AM, Federal Circuit Court judge and commissioner of Australian Law Reform Commission
- John Nicholas, Federal Court judge (BA/LLB)
- Pat O'Shane AM, teacher, barrister, public servant, jurist, Aboriginal activist; Australia's first Aboriginal magistrate; former chancellor of the University of New England (LLB 1976)

==== Other legal professionals ====
- Stuart Fuller, legal partner in the banking and finance team at law firm King & Wood Mallesons (Commerce/Law)
- Stuart Littlemore QC, barrister, writer and original host of ABC's Media Watch (Law)
- George Newhouse, human rights lawyer, former local councillor (Commerce/Law)

== Military ==
- Peter Abigail, retired Australian Army officer, ranked major general
- Tim Barrett AO, CSC, current Australian chief of Navy, ranked vice admiral
- Greg Bilton AM, CSC, current Australian Army officer serving as deputy chief of Joint Operations, ranked major general
- Rick Burr AO, DSC, MVO, current Australian Army officer serving as chief of Army, ranked lieutenant general
- John Caligari AO, DSC, retired Australian Army officer, ranked lieutenant general (Arts/Defence Studies)
- John Cantwell, AO, DSC, retired Australian Army officer, ranked major general
- Allan du Toit AM, retired Australian Navy officer, ranked real admiral (Defence/Strategic Studies)
- Gus Gilmore AO, DSC, current Australian Army officer, serving as head of Military Strategic Commitments Division, ranked major general (Arts)
- James Goldrick AO, CSC, retired Australian Navy officer, ranked rear admiral (Arts)
- Ian Gordon AO, retired Australian Army officer, ranked major general (Science/Military Studies, 1973)
- John Harvey, retired Royal Australian Air Force officer, ranked air marshal (Architecture/Psychology/Information Science)
- Andrew Hastie, current member for Canning, retired Australian Army officer
- Peter Jones AO, DSC, retired Australian Navy officer, ranked vice admiral (BA/MA)
- Mark Kelly AO, DSC, retired Australian Army officer, ranked major general (BA/MA)
- Mike Kelly AO, current member for Eden-Monaro, retired Australian Army officer (PhD Law)
- David Kilcullen, Australian author, strategist and global counterinsurgency expert; retired Australian Army officer, ranked lieutenant colonel (BA, PhD)
- Andrew Nikolic, former politician and retired Australian Army officer (Management)
- Stuart Robert, current member for Fadden, former Australian Army officer (Arts)

== Popular culture ==
- Sam Chui, world's most popular aviation blogger, based in United Arab Emirates
- Amy Lyons, Internet personality in China
- Pranav Mohanlal, Malayalam film actor

== Religious leaders ==
- Peter Chiswell, Anglican bishop, formerly the bishop of Armidale
- Tom Frame, Anglican bishop, historian, academic, author and social commentator (Arts/PhD)
- Peter Hayward, Anglican bishop, currently serving as the bishop of Wollongong (Civil Engineering)
- Brian King, former Anglican assistant bishop in the Diocese of Sydney (Theology)
- Julian Leow Beng Kim, current archbishop of the Roman Catholic Archdiocese of Kuala Lumpur (Building)

== Sciences ==
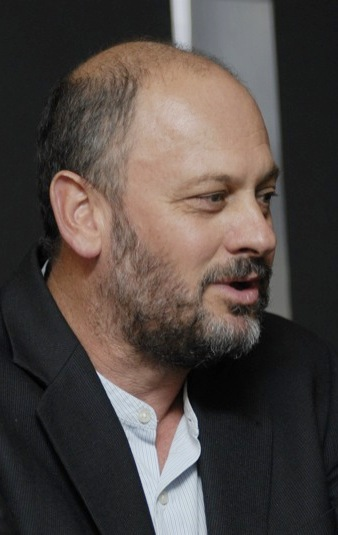
Tim Flannery, mammalogist, palaeontologist and activist

=== Biology ===
- Mark Burgman, ecologist (Science)
- Jessie Christiansen, exoplanetologist
- Bernard d'Abrera, entomological taxonomist and philosopher of science (Arts with majors in History/Science)
- Steve Donnellan, biologist and chief research scientist of the Evolutionary Biology Unit at the South Australian Museum (Science)
- Tim Flannery, mammalogist, palaeontologist, environmentalist and global warming activist; 2007 Australian of the Year (PhD Palaeontology)
- Camille Goldstone-Henry, Wildlife Scientist
- Levon Khachigian, vascular cell and molecular biologist and academic (B.Science (Honours), PhD, D.Science)
- Zinnia Kumar, evolutionary biologist, ecologist and fashion model (B. Advanced Science [Honours])
- Alan O. Trounson, biologist

=== Chemistry ===
- Rose Amal, chemical engineer
- Gordon Aylward, chemist and author
- Naiyyum Choudhury, Bangladeshi biochemist, founding chairman of Bangladesh Atomic Energy Regulatory Authority (BAERA) (Biotechnology)
- Kathryn Fagg AO (M.Com.), chemical engineer, chair of the CSIRO from 2021

=== Computer scientists ===
- Clive Finkelstein, computer scientist, known as the "father" of information technology engineering (Science)
- Carsten Haitzler, computer scientist, creator of Enlightenment
- Gernot Heiser, operating systems and ACM Fellow
- Adam Kennedy, computer scientist
- Sitthichai Pookaiyaudom, first Thai elected to IEEE Fellow; current president of Mahanakorn University of Technology; Thailand's Minister of Information and Communication Technologies
- Claude Sammut, computer scientist
- Raj Reddy, computer scientist, Turing Award

=== Engineering ===
- Julie Cairney, professor of Materials Science and director of the Australian Centre for Microscopy and Microanalysis
- Michael Collins, Canadian structural engineer (PhD)
- Saeid Eslamian, Iranian hydrologist (Engineering)
- Ron Fitch, railway executive and railway engineer (PhD)
- Graham Goodwin, Australian electrical engineer and academic (Science, 1964; PhD, 1970)
- Saul Griffith, Australian American inventor and material science mechanical engineer (Mechanical Engineering, 1997)
- Jim May, CEO of AMIRA, chemical engineer and metallurgist
- Sam Michael, sporting director of McLaren (Engineering)
- Stuart Wenham, director of ARC Photovoltaics Centre of Excellence, UNSW Australia (Engineering)

=== Mathematics and economics ===
- Michael Barber, mathematician, physicist and vice-chancellor of Flinders University 2008–2014 (Mathematics)
- Lynne Billard, statistician and US academic (Science)
- Lawrie Brown, cryptographer and computer security researcher (Mathematics)
- Stephen Duckett, health economist (Health Administration/PhD)

=== Medicine ===
- Samy Azer, international medical educator (Medicine)
- Julie Campbell, vascular biologist
- David A. Cooper, HIV/AIDS researcher and immunologist
- Sir Richard Feachem KBE, global public health administrator and anti-malaria activist (PhD in Environmental Health)
- Peter Fricker OAM, sports physician and administrator (MB BS)
- Michelle Haber AM, paediatric cancer researcher (Psychology, PhD [Pathology])
- Steven Krilis, immunologist
- Louise Maple-Brown FAHMS, endocrinologist and clinical researcher
- Charlie Teo, neurosurgeon

==== Other medical sciences ====
- John Ball, cognitive scientist
- Julie Campbell, vascular biologist and current director of the Centre for Research in Vascular Biology at the University of Queensland (Physiology)
- David Cooper AO, FAA, Australian HIV/AIDS researcher, immunologist, professor at the University of New South Wales, and the director of the Kirby Institute (Medicine)
- Gordon Parker, psychiatrist

=== Physics ===
- Joan Adler, computational physicist
- Murray Batchelor, mathematical physicist
- Karl Kruszelnicki, physicist, medical practitioner, and science communicator (Biomedical Engineering)
- John Pyke, physicist and retired law lecturer (LLB)

== Service sector ==
- Huen Su Yin, Malaysian blogger and cake designer (Construction Management)

== Sport ==
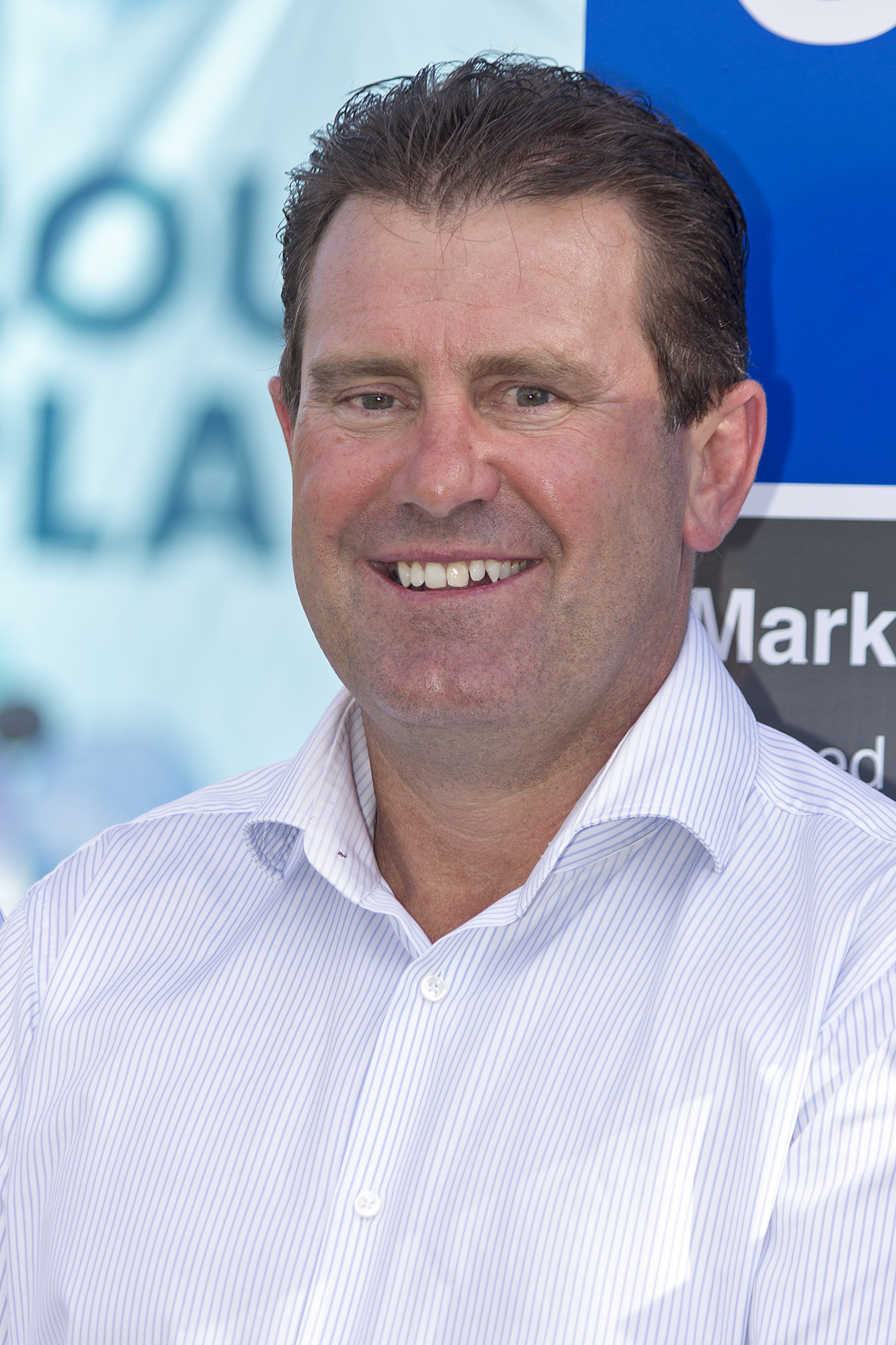
Mark Taylor, cricketer

- Sally Bennett, sabre fencer
- Matt Carroll AM, sports administrator and current chief executive of the Australian Olympic Committee (Construction)
- Todd Greenberg, sports administrator and current chief executive of the National Rugby League (Sports Science)
- Andrew Jones, sports administrator and current chief executive of Cricket NSW (BA/LLB)
- Phil Kearns AM, former rugby union international; former Wallabies captain (Arts)
- Tadhg Kennelly, former Australian rules football who played for the Sydney Swans
- Usman Khawaja, Pakistani-born Australian cricketer (Aviation)
- Geoff Lawson, cricketer
- Ewen McKenzie, current coach of the Queensland Reds
- Simon Poidevin, former Wallabies captain
- Marshall Rosen, cricketer
- Jane Saville, 2004 Summer Olympics medallist
- Michael Slater, cricketer
- Mark Taylor, cricketer (Australia's 39th test captain), Australian of the Year 1999
- Richard Walsh, professional mixed martial artist
- Michael Wenden, swimming champion, 1968 Summer Olympics gold medallist (two gold, one silver, one bronze)
