= Kogarah ANZAC Memorial =

War memorial in Australia

Coordinates: 33°57′55″S 151°08′00″E

The Kogarah ANZAC Memorial is a war memorial located in the town square, on Belgrave Street, of Kogarah, New South Wales, Australia. Located between St George Hospital and the Greek Orthodox Church, it was built to recognize the sacrifice of Australian nurses and the significance of Greek support towards the Australian troops during World War One. Unveiled on 4 March 2017, the memorial consists of a bronze injured soldier backed by the outline of a nurse in a metal frame. A bronze plaque details a history of Lemnos’s part in the landing of Gallipoli, a map of the hospitals, a list of each nation’s casualties, and a recognition of the 2 692 Australian nurses who volunteered to serve internationally. The statue was created by the Georges River Council's first Artist in Residence, Takis Kozokos, with the help of a grant from the Department of Veterans Affairs' ANZAC Centenary Local Grants Program.

== History ==
The statue commemorates the contribution of Australian nurses and Greek support during World War One, marking the 102nd year since Australian nurses arrived in Lemnos in 1915. Moudros was occupied by Allied Forces on 23 February 1915 in preparation for the attack on Gallipolli, also serving as a hospital base for the Allied Forces. Lemnos now houses three cemeteries - the Portianos Military Cemetery, the East Moudros Military Cemetery, and the West Moudros Cemetery. On October 30, 1918, the Armistice of Moudros was signed marking the end in hostilities between the Ottoman Empire and the Allies.
