= Bagheri =

Bagheri is an Iranian surname. Notable people with the surname include:

- Ali Bagheri (born 1966), Iranian diplomat
- Amir-Bahman Bagheri, Iranian military officer
- Amir Bagheri (born 1978), Iranian chess grandmaster
- Farshid Bagheri (born 1992), Iranian footballer
- Hasan Bagheri (1956–1983), Iranian revolutionary and journalist
- Jalil Bagheri Jeddi, Iranian paralympic athlete
- Kamran Bagheri Lankarani (born 1965), Iranian physician, politician and Minister of Health and Medical Education
- Karim Bagheri (born 1974), Iranian football player and coach
- Khosrow Bagheri (born 1957), Iranian philosopher, educational theorist and the president of Philosophy of Education Society of Iran (PESI)
- Kourosh Bagheri (born 1977), Iranian weightlifter
- Meisam Bagheri, Iranian taekwondo athlete
- Mehdi Bagheri (born 1980), Iranian kamancheh player and composer
- Mohammad Bagheri (general) (c. 1960/1961–2025), Iranian Islamic Revolutionary Guard Corps military commander
- Mohammad Bagheri (politician) (born 1971), Iranian Shiite cleric and politician
- Mohammad Bagheri Motamed (born 1986), Iranian taekwondo practitioner
- Rouhollah Bagheri (born 1991), Iranian footballer

== See also ==
- Bagheri Expressway, is an expressway in eastern Tehran in Tehranpars neighborhood
- Shahid Bagheri Metro Station, is a station in Tehran Metro Line 2 in Iran
