= Michelle King (disambiguation) =

Michelle King (born 1962) is an American television writer and producer.

Michelle King may also refer to:

- Michelle King (educator) (1961–2019), American educator
- Michelle King (government official), American public official
- Michelle King (journalist), New Zealand journalist
