= George A. C. Murrell =

Australian orthopaedic surgeon and researcher

George Murrell
- Born: George Anthony Calvert Murrell; Adelaide, South Australia, Australia
- Citizenship: Australian
- Education: University of Adelaide (MBBS); University of Oxford (DPhil)
- Known for: Research on tendinopathy, rotator cuff disease, and the role of nitric oxide in tendon healing
- Awards: Rhodes Scholarship (South Australia, 1984); Arris and Gale Medal; American Orthopaedic Society for Sports Medicine Basic Science Award
- Scientific career
- Fields: Orthopaedic surgery, sports medicine, musculoskeletal research
- Workplaces: University of New South Wales; St George Hospital, Sydney

George Anthony Calvert Murrell is an Australian orthopaedic surgeon and clinical researcher. He serves as the Director of the Orthopaedic Research Institute at St George Hospital, in Sydney, and a conjoint professor at the University of New South Wales. His research focuses on the biology, biomechanics, diagnosis, and treatment of shoulder conditions, particularly tendon injuries and tendinopathy.

== Early life and education ==
Murrell was born in Adelaide, South Australia. He attended St Peter's College, Adelaide.

He studied medicine at the University of Adelaide, graduating with an MBBS.

== Medical and academic career ==
Murrell served as a tutor in the Department of Anatomy at the University of Cambridge, working with Professor Harold Ellis and teaching at Gonville and Caius College, Emmanuel College, and New Hall, Cambridge (now Murray Edwards College, Cambridge). He co-authored the book Research in Medicine: Planning a Project and Writing a Thesis with Chris Huang and Harold Ellis, published by Cambridge University Press in 1990.

Murrell completed orthopaedic surgery training at Duke University in the United States and became a member of the Piedmont Orthopedic Society. He took a fellowship in sports medicine and shoulder surgery at the Hospital for Special Surgery at Weill Cornell Medicine in New York.

Since 1995, Murrell has served as Director of the Orthopaedic Research Institute at St George Hospital, Sydney. He also holds a conjoint professorship at the University of New South Wales.

== Research ==
=== Nitric oxide and tendon healing ===
Murrell has conducted research on the biological role of nitric oxide in tendon injury and repair. Early experimental studies from his laboratory demonstrated that nitric oxide synthase activity increases following tendon injury and that inhibition of nitric oxide production impairs healing, reducing tendon strength and structural recovery.

Experimental models indicated that suppression of nitric oxide signalling delays healing, whereas supplementation can enhance tendon repair.

=== Molecular biology of tendinopathy ===
Murrell’s laboratory has studied cellular and molecular responses of tendon tissue to mechanical load and injury. His group showed that overuse increases nitric oxide synthase expression in rotator cuff tendon, indicating a role for nitric oxide in mechanical stress response.

He has also examined molecular regulators of tendon degeneration and repair, including inflammatory pathways and heat shock proteins, contributing to understanding of cellular stress in chronic tendinopathy.

=== Rotator cuff and shoulder pathology ===
Murrell has conducted research on rotator cuff disease and shoulder biomechanics, including mechanisms of tendon degeneration, repair, and surgical outcomes. His work has examined structural and cellular aspects of rotator cuff injury and their implications for clinical treatment.

== Awards and honours ==
- South Australian Rhodes Scholarship (1984)
- Royal College of Surgeons Arris and Gale Medal
- American College of Sports Medicine New Investigator Award
- American Orthopaedic Association Zimmer Awards (resident and fellow categories)
- American Orthopaedic Society for Sports Medicine Basic Science Award
- American Orthopaedic Association North American Travelling Fellowship
- International Society for Free Radical Research Young Investigator Award
- Fédération Internationale de Médecine du Sport Intercontinental Travelling Fellowship
- F. E. Johnson Memorial Fellowship for Outstanding Achievement in Sports Medicine Research, NSW Sporting Injuries Committee Sports Safety Awards (2005)
- Petronas Chair, University of Malaya
- Pier Giorgio Marchetti Distinguished International Alumnus Award, Hospital for Special Surgery
- Distinguished Collegian, St Mark's College, Adelaide
