= Renée Adams =

German-American economist

Renée Birgit Adams is a German American economist specialising in corporate finance and corporate governance. She is Professor of Finance at Saïd Business School, University of Oxford.

== Education ==
Adams earned a PhD in economics from the University of Chicago in 2001. She previously completed a Master of Science in mathematics at Stanford University in 1993 and a Bachelor of Arts in mathematics at the University of California, San Diego in 1991.

== Career ==
Adams began her academic career after working as an economist at the Federal Reserve Bank of New York from 1999 to 2003. After that, she held faculty positions at the Stockholm School of Economics, first as assistant professor and then associate professor. She later served as professor of finance at the University of Queensland and at UNSW Business School in Australia.

In 2018, she joined the University of Oxford as professor of finance at Saïd Business School. She is also a senior research fellow at Jesus College, Oxford.

Adams has held numerous visiting and distinguished visiting positions at universities and research institutions in Europe, Asia, and Australia, including Goethe University Frankfurt, Aalto University, CEIBS in Shanghai, and Kyoto University.

== Research ==
Adams' research focuses on corporate governance, inequality, and gender, especially in the context of the governance of financial institutions. Her work examines board structures, diversity, incentives, and institutional decision processes in corporate and financial settings.

Her research has been cited in the Financial Times for showing that while companies with more women on boards often perform better, the relationship reflects correlation rather than clear causal effects, with firm-specific characteristics playing a central role.

Her research has been cited in The New York Times in the context of scrutiny of Federal Reserve governance, showing that banks whose executives sit on regional Fed boards experience positive stock market reactions and fewer supervisory enforcement actions during the director's tenure. Her research was also cited on many other news outets such as NPR, CNN, the Financial Times and in The Economist.

Her research has been cited over 30,000 times.
