= Elizabeth Elliott (paediatrician) =

Australian scientist and paediatrician

Elizabeth Elliott AO FAHMS FRSN

Academic background
- Education: Bachelor of Medicine and Surgery (MBBS), Master of Philosophy (MPhil), Doctorate of Medicine (MD) at University of Sydney. Fellow; 1993, Royal Australasian College of Physicians; 1996, Royal College of Physicians. Women's College within the University of Sydney. SCEGGS Darlinghurst.

Elizabeth Jane Elliott is an Australian clinician scientist and paediatrician. She is an Officer of the Order of Australia (AO), for services to paediatrics and child health, as well as an Elected Fellow of the Australian Academy of Health and Medical Science (AAHMS), Fellow of the Royal Society of NSW, and Fellow of the Academy of Child and Adolescent Health. She was the first female to win the James Cook Medal, awarded by the Royal Society of NSW for contributions to human welfare. She is a Distinguished Professor of paediatrics at the University of Sydney and a Consultant Paediatrician at the Sydney Children’s Hospitals Network, Westmead, and regarded as a "pioneer in fetal alcohol spectrum disorder, advocacy and patient care".

Elliott is the Founder and Director of the Australian Paediatric Surveillance Unit, which conducts research on rare childhood diseases. She has a national and international reputation in research, has held two prestigious Practitioner Fellowships from the NHMRC (National Health and Medical Research Council of Australia) and currently holds a Medical Research Futures Fund Next Generation Fellowship.

== Early life ==
Elliott was raised in a family of medical practitioners, with a mother who worked with disabled children and a father who was an obstetrician and gynaecologist. Her maternal grandfather was an ANZAC who landed at Gallipoli on 25 April 1915 and set up resources for mobile medical clinics. Her paternal grandfather delivered Australia's first surviving quadruplets in Bellingen NSW. She worked in her first paediatric job at Blacktown Hospital and then worked in the UK in the 1980s. Elliott went to SCEGGS Darlinghurst for her high school education and the Women's College within the University of Sydney, where she was the Senior Student. She obtained her MB BS, MPhil in Public Health and a research Doctorate in medicine from University of Sydney. She is a Fellow of the Royal College of Paediatrics and Child Health, UK (FRCPCH); the Royal College of Physicians, London (FRCP); and the Royal Australasian College of Physicians (FRACP).

== Career ==
She has worked in paediatric health, as well as fetal alcohol syndrome. In addition, Elliott visited Christmas Island with a team of medical professionals to determine the health of children, who were asylum seekers and refugees in detention. Invited by Professor Gillian Triggs, the team interviewed over 200 children, including unaccompanied minors, and reported on their physical and mental health, including the presence of respiratory viruses, and instances of self-harm among parents and children. This led to her publishing her findings for the Australian Human Rights Commission on the “health and well-being of children in immigration detention”.

She has worked on the health of indigenous populations in Western Australia, and Asia. She also is part of a team travelling to Vietnam to improve health outcomes, with a combination of research and clinical work. Elliott reported "the combination of research and clinical work keeps me grounded – nothing is more rewarding than seeing a severely ill child recover".

== Awards, honours and recognition ==
- 2026 – Officer of the Order of Australia for "distinguished service to paediatric medicine, to women's health, and to medical and social understanding of Fetal Alcohol Spectrum Disorder".
- 2018 – AMA Excellence in Healthcare award.
- 2018 – First women to win the James Cook Medal awarded by the Royal Society of New South Wales.
- 2016 – Fellow of the Australian Academy of Health and Medical Sciences (FAHMS).
- 2011 – John Sands College Medal from Royal Australasian College of Physicians.
- 2013 – 100 Women of Influence, Australian Financial Review and Westpac.
- 2008 – Howard Williams Medal and Oration.
- 2008 – Member of the Order of Australia for services to paediatrics and child health.
