= Australian Economics and Business Studies Competition =

The Australian Economics and Business Studies Competition is an annual event aimed to assess students on their knowledge and understanding of economic and business theories. The Competition involves the participation of over 15,000 secondary students from more than 900 schools. The coordination of the Competition is performed by a non-profit organisation, the Organising Committee from the Australian School of Business at the University of New South Wales. The Organisation and its activities are undertaken entirely by students on a voluntary basis with generous support from the University.

== History ==
The Australian Economics Competition was first launched in New South Wales in 1991, and has since grown significantly to become one of the most recognised competitions of its kind. In 1996, due to overwhelming popularity, the competition expanded nationally, with students participating from all states and territories in Australia.

Since its introduction in 1999, the Australian Business Studies Competition has also experienced significant popularity and growth. In 2013, close to 10,000 high students from all states and territories across Australia took part in both Competitions, and in 2014, the Competition had its 23rd anniversary.

With the support of the University of Auckland, in 1997, students from New Zealand were invited to participate in the Economics Competition for the first time, with their involvement growing considerably from those earlier years. In later years, the competition continued to attract high school students from Tonga, Malaysia, Indonesia and Singapore.

== Format ==
Both competitions consist of 40 multiple choice questions, each with 4 choices, and points are gained or deducted for correct and incorrect responses respectively. All questions are of equal value. Each student will start off with ten marks. One mark will be awarded for each correct response, whilst each incorrect response will attract a one quarter mark penalty to discourage random guessing. Unattempted questions score zero. This gives a total mark ranging from 0 to 50.

The Competitions have a total duration of 50 minutes, and take place within each school, under strict examination conditions and supervision. No calculators or rulers are allowed during the competitions.

== Syllabus ==
The competition questions are set in conjunction with academics from the University of New South Wales. The competitions aim to provide a set of interesting and challenging questions to encourage and stimulate discussions amongst students and teachers, and encourages awareness of the current economics, business and political environment. These questions are not explicitly aimed at meeting the Australian Economics and Business Studies high school examination syllabi, but will stretch students in their understanding of those topics.

== Awards system ==
Awards and prizes for both Competitions are in two divisions: Year 11 and below, and Year 12. In each division, awards are allocated on a statewide basis as follows:

- High Distinction – Top 5%
- Distinction – Next 15% (top 5-20%)
- Credit – Next 30% (top 20-50%)
- Participation- For all other students

All participating students receive a certificate signed by a representative from the University of New South Wales. In addition, top students from each division receive monetary prize(s). The prizes are $50, $75, $100 and $200 for each of the State Winners. The overall National Winner(s) receive $400. State and National Winners also receive engraved trophies.
