= Steven Krilis =

Greek-born Australian physician-scientist and clinical immunologist

Steven Antony Krilis AM
- Born: 26 November 1947 (age 78); Athens, Greece
- Education: University of New South Wales; University of Sydney
- Known for: Research on beta-2 glycoprotein I and antiphospholipid syndrome; Sydney classification criteria
- Awards: Member of the Order of Australia; Corresponding Member of the Academy of Athens; honorary doctorate, National and Kapodistrian University of Athens
- Scientific career
- Fields: Clinical immunology, autoimmunity, thrombosis, haemostasis, allergy, protein redox biology
- Workplaces: University of New South Wales; St George Hospital

Steven Antony Krilis AM (born 26 November 1947) is a Greek-born Australian physician-scientist, clinical immunologist and academic. He is a conjoint professor in the School of Clinical Medicine at the University of New South Wales (UNSW) and has served as head of the Department of Infectious Disease, Immunology and Sexual Health at St George Hospital, Sydney. His research has addressed antiphospholipid syndrome (APS), beta-2 glycoprotein I (β2GPI), thrombosis, allergy, inflammation, innate immunity and the redox regulation of extracellular plasma proteins.

Krilis and colleagues reported that autoimmune anticardiolipin-antibody binding required a plasma cofactor and subsequently purified and identified the cofactor as β2GPI. This work contributed to a shift in APS research towards antibodies directed against phospholipid-binding plasma proteins. Subsequent studies by Krilis and collaborators investigated the structure and physiological functions of β2GPI in coagulation, innate immunity, vascular injury and extracellular redox regulation.

Krilis organised and chaired the 11th International Congress on Antiphospholipid Antibodies in Sydney in 2004. The associated international workshop revised the preliminary Sapporo classification criteria. The resulting consensus statement, published in 2006 with Spyridon Miyakis as first author and Krilis as senior author, became widely known as the Sydney classification criteria and was extensively used in APS research before publication of the 2023 ACR/EULAR criteria.

== Early life and education ==
Krilis was born in Athens on 26 November 1947 and emigrated to Australia in 1955.

In 1972, Krilis, graduated with a Bachelor of Medicine and Bachelor of Surgery with honors (MBBS) from the University of New South Wales, Sydney Australia. In 1984, Krilis was awarded a PhD in Medicine from the University of Sydney, Australia. His PhD thesis identified the major allergen of the common house dust mite and generated monoclonal antibodies which he used to standardize house dust mite extracts.

In 1981, Krilis was awarded a National Health and Medical Research Council fellowship and a Fogarty International Postdoctoral Research Fellowship, to undertake post doctoral research at Harvard Medical School and Brigham and Women's Hospital. with K. Frank Austen and Elias J. Corey, investigating sulfidopeptide leukotrienes.

== Academic career ==
In November 1983, Krilis completed his Post Doctoral research and returned to Australia. In 1984, he became a post doctoral fellow at the Department of Medicine at St George Hospital, Kogarah, Australia. In 1990, he was appointed Professor of Medicine at the University of New South Wales. He held this position until 1993, when he became Director of the Department of Immunology, Allergy and Infectious Diseases and Sexual Health at St George Hospital ..

== Research ==
=== Leukotriene biology ===
During his Harvard postdoctoral work, Krilis contributed to studies of sulfidopeptide leukotrienes. In 1984, Krilis, Lewis, Corey and Austen reported a specific high-affinity receptor for leukotriene C4 in guinea-pig ileal smooth muscle and associated membrane fractions. The receptor's binding characteristics were consistent with mediation of the contractile response to leukotriene C4.

=== Mast-cell biology ===
After returning to Australia in 1983, Krilis established a programme in human mast-cell biology. His laboratory investigated the differentiation and maturation of mast cells from human bone-marrow progenitors and factors regulating mast cells and basophils. Later studies examined interleukin-16-responsive mast-cell and basophil progenitors and cytokine regulation of these cells.

=== β2-glycoprotein I and antiphospholipid syndrome ===
In 1989, Krilis and colleagues reported that autoimmune anticardiolipin-antibody binding depended on a plasma cofactor. In 1990, they purified the cofactor and identified it as β2GPI, also known as apolipoprotein H. Subsequent work from the laboratory investigated the structure, ligand binding and biological functions of β2GPI.

==== Structure and gene-targeted mice ====
Krilis and collaborators used mutagenesis and structural studies to identify regions of β2GPI involved in phospholipid binding, including basic residues in domain V.

In 2001, Krilis and colleagues reported the first published gene-targeted β2GPI-deficient mouse model. Plasma from the deficient mice showed impaired thrombin generation. An independently generated β2GPI-deficient mouse model was reported in 2025.

==== Haemostasis and vascular injury ====
Krilis and colleagues showed that β2GPI binds coagulation factor XI and inhibits its activation by thrombin and factor XIIa. The interaction was localised to domain V, which is cleaved by factor XIa.

They also reported a redox-regulated interaction between β2GPI and von Willebrand factor, controlled by thioredoxin-1. In murine thrombosis models, domain V mediated the antithrombotic effect of β2GPI. Domain V also reduced natural IgM-mediated myocardial injury in a mouse model of cardiac ischaemia-reperfusion.

==== Innate immunity ====
Experimental studies showed that β2GPI ameliorated Gram-negative bacterial inflammation and protected mice against Gram-negative septicaemia.

==== Extracellular protein redox biology ====
Krilis and colleagues investigated reversible thiol-disulphide exchange in circulating proteins. They demonstrated redox-dependent regulation of β2GPI and its interaction with von Willebrand factor, showed that factor XI is a substrate for oxidoreductases and that reduction enhances its activation, and investigated redox forms of complement factor H and angiotensinogen.

A case-control study using an enzyme-linked immunosorbent assay found lower free-thiol angiotensinogen in women with pre-eclampsia than in healthy pregnant controls. The assay was later described as a method for quantifying total and free-thiol angiotensinogen.

== International leadership and classification criteria ==
Krilis organised and chaired the 11th International Congress on Antiphospholipid Antibodies in Sydney in 2004. The congress included an international workshop convened to revise the preliminary Sapporo classification criteria. The consensus statement was published in 2006 with Spyridon Miyakis, then a fellow in Krilis's department, as first author and Krilis as senior author.

The Sydney criteria incorporated anti-β2GPI antibodies among the laboratory criteria, required persistent antibody positivity on tests at least 12 weeks apart, and refined aspects of the clinical classification of thrombotic and obstetric APS. They were extensively used in APS research before the 2023 ACR/EULAR revision.

== Reviews ==
Krilis and Bill Giannakopoulos co-authored How I Treat the Antiphospholipid Syndrome in Blood in 2009. In 2013 they published The Pathogenesis of the Antiphospholipid Syndrome in the New England Journal of Medicine. Their 2024 review in Clinical Immunology examined the context-dependent functions of β2GPI domain V in health and disease.

== Honours and recognition ==
Krilis was appointed a Member of the Order of Australia in the 2019 Queen's Birthday Honours "for significant service to medical research in the areas of inflammation, thrombosis and allergic disease".

In 2011, he received an honorary doctorate from the National and Kapodistrian University of Athens.

In 2023, Krilis was elected a Corresponding Member of the Academy of Athens in the science of medicine, becoming the second Australian elected to the institution.

== Selected publications ==
- McNeil, H. P.; Chesterman, C. N.; Krilis, S. A. (1989). "Anticardiolipin antibodies and lupus anticoagulants comprise separate antibody subgroups with different phospholipid binding characteristics". British Journal of Haematology. 73 (4): 506–513. doi:10.1111/j.1365-2141.1989.tb00289.x. PMID 2514785.
- McNeil, H. P.; Simpson, R. J.; Chesterman, C. N.; Krilis, S. A. (1990). "Anti-phospholipid antibodies are directed against a complex antigen that includes a lipid-binding inhibitor of coagulation: β2-glycoprotein I (apolipoprotein H)". Proceedings of the National Academy of Sciences of the United States of America. 87 (11): 4120–4124. Bibcode:1990PNAS...87.4120M. doi:10.1073/pnas.87.11.4120. PMC 54059. PMID 2349221.
- Miyakis, S.; Lockshin, M. D.; Atsumi, T.; et al. (2006). "International consensus statement on an update of the classification criteria for definite antiphospholipid syndrome (APS)". Journal of Thrombosis and Haemostasis. 4 (2): 295–306. doi:10.1111/j.1538-7836.2006.01753.x. hdl:11379/21509. PMID 16420554.
- Giannakopoulos, B.; Krilis, S. A. (2009). "How I treat the antiphospholipid syndrome". Blood. 114 (10): 2020–2030. doi:10.1182/blood-2009-05-220756. PMID 19587374.
- Giannakopoulos, B.; Krilis, S. A. (2013). "The pathogenesis of the antiphospholipid syndrome". New England Journal of Medicine. 368 (11): 1033–1044. doi:10.1056/NEJMra1112830. PMID 23484830.
