= Richard Bryant (psychologist) =

Australian psychologist

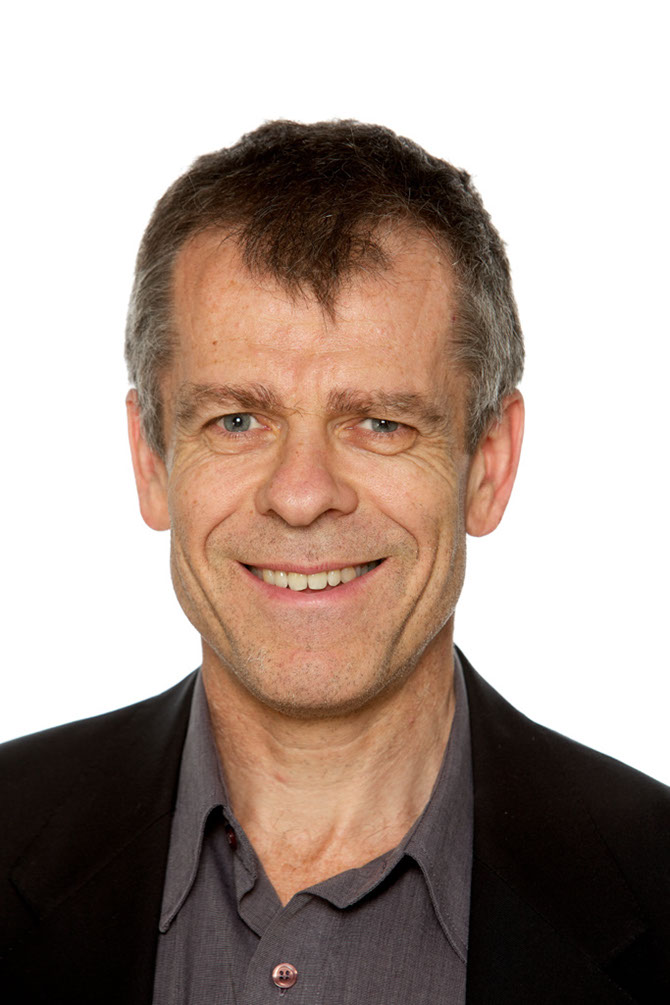
Professor Richard Bryant

Richard Allan Bryant AC FAA (born 17 August 1960) is an Australian medical scientist. He is Scientia Professor of Psychology at the University of New South Wales (UNSW) and director of the UNSW Traumatic Stress Clinic, based at UNSW and Westmead Institute for Medical Research. His main areas of research are posttraumatic stress disorder (PTSD) and prolonged grief disorder. On 13 June 2016 he was appointed a Companion of the Order of Australia (AC), for eminent service to medical research in the field of psychotraumatology, as a psychologist and author, to the study of Indigenous mental health, as an advisor to a range of government and international organisations, and to professional societies.

== Education ==
After attending North Sydney Boys High School, Bryant completed his B.A. (Hons) in Psychology at the University of Sydney in 1983; his Master of Clinical Psychology at Macquarie University in 1986; and his Doctor of Philosophy in Psychology at Macquarie University in 1989. He was awarded a Doctor of Science at the University of New South Wales in 2016. He is a Fellow of the Australian Psychological Society, Fellow of the Association for Psychological Science, Fellow of the Australian Academy of Science, Fellow of the Australian Academy of Health and Medical Sciences, Fellow of the Academy of the Social Sciences in Australia.

== Career ==
In 1989 Bryant commenced working at Westmead Hospital as a clinical psychologist, responsible for managing trauma and burns patients. In 1993 he established the Traumatic Stress Clinic at Westmead Hospital. In 1995 he joined the School of Psychology at the University of New South Wales as a Lecturer, and was promoted to Professor in 2002. Bryant was appointed a Scientia Professor in 2005. In 2009 he was awarded an inaugural Australian Research Council Laureate Fellowship, and in 2014 a National Health and Medical Research Council Senior Principal Research Fellowship.

Bryant has worked on many Australian and international projects aimed at reducing PTSD and other mental health disorders following trauma exposure. These include the 9/11 terrorist attacks in New York, the 2004 Asian tsunami, and Hurricane Katrina. For example, he worked with the Thai Ministry of Health to develop a mental health initiative to manage the effects of the tsunami on mental health. Following Hurricane Katrina he was invited to co-develop a mental health protocol for managing disasters in the USA. Bryant adapted his protocol in the aftermath of the major Black Saturday bushfires in Australia, which government authorities adopted as the mental health response to the disaster. In addition, he served on the American Psychiatric Association's DSM-5 Working Group on Traumatic Stress Disorders and the World Health Organisation's ICD-11 Traumatic Stress Advisory Group to develop the new diagnostic definitions of traumatic stress disorders.

=== Traumatic Stress Clinic ===
Bryant's Traumatic Stress Clinic, founded in 1993, is a major not-for-profit treatment centre. It has conducted many research activities pertaining to the development, maintenance, and treatment of traumatic stress. It conducts treatment programs for PTSD, Prolonged Grief Disorder, PTSD in emergency service workers (police, fire, and ambulance workers), and PTSD in journalists.

== Research interests ==
=== Acute stress disorder ===
Acute stress disorder was a new disorder introduced in 1994 to describe acute traumatic stress in the initial month after trauma that is predictive of chronic PTSD. Bryant is widely recognised as the world's leading expert on acute stress disorder. On the basis of numerous longitudinal research, he has developed the prevailing measurement tools of acute stress disorder, identified many of the biological, cognitive, and behavioural indices of acute stress, and pioneered the major treatment studies of acute stress disorder. His assessment instruments have been translated into over 15 languages, and his treatment protocols are the gold standard for early intervention after trauma.

When acute stress disorder was introduced it was argued that its emphasis on dissociative symptoms in the acute phase after trauma (such as emotional numbing, dissociative amnesia, and depersonalisation) are strongly predictive of chronic PTSD. Bryant's work challenged the fundamental premise of the initial conceptualisation that dissociative responses shortly after trauma are seminal in predicting PTSD, and this resulted in a major shift in the DSM-5 so that emphasis was not placed on dissociation and acute stress disorder was not intended to predict PTSD.

=== Posttraumatic stress disorder ===
Bryant has conducted numerous treatment trials on Post-traumatic stress disorder with a focus on cognitive behaviour therapy. In terms of treatment of PTSD, he has also conducted the first studies that showed genetic markers of treatment response, brain regions using functional MRI and structural MRI to predict treatment response, and how cognitive behaviour therapy alters brain function in PTSD patients. He has also conducted seminal studies on the development of PTSD by assessing people prior to trauma and subsequent to the trauma; these studies have mapped core psychophysiological and cognitive risk factors for developing PTSD.

=== Grief ===
Bryant has conducted some of the first studies into cognitive factors that underpin Prolonged Grief Disorder from normal bereavement, including memory styles, appraisals, and how people imagine their futures. Bryant has also conducted the first studies of different neural circuits between Prolonged Grief Disorder and other psychological conditions. In addition, he conducted a major controlled trial of treating Prolonged Grief Disorder that demonstrated that reliving memories of the loss is critical to optimising treatment response.

=== Global mental health ===
Bryant has collaborated with the World Health Organisation to develop a mental health intervention that can be trained to lay health providers in countries that lack mental health specialists. The intervention (termed Problem Management Plus) has been developed to ensure that Low and Middle Income Countries can scale up the intervention to reduce mental health problems following adversity.

== Awards ==
- Royal Society of New South Wales James Cook Medal, 2020
- International Society of Traumatic Stress Studies Lifetime Achievement Award, 2018
- Association for Psychological Science James McKeen Cattell Fellow Award, 2018
- Australian Society of Psychiatric Research Founders Medal, 2016
- Australian Laureate Fellowship, 2009
- Australian Association for Cognitive Behaviour Therapy Lifetime Scientific Achievement Award, 2006
- International Society of Traumatic Stress Studies Robert F. Laufer Award, 2001
- Australian Museum Eureka Prize for Scientific Research, 2000
- Academy of the Social Sciences in Australia Academy Medal, 1999
- Companion in the Order of Australia (AC), for his work in Indigenous and refugee mental health, and as an adviser to government and international organisations"

== Selected publications ==
=== Books ===
- Bryant, R.A., & Harvey, A.G. (2000). Acute Stress disorder: A handbook of theory, assessment, and treatment. Washington, DC: American Psychological Association.
- Boyce, P.M., Harris, A.W.F., Drobny, J.V., Lampe, L., Starcevic, V., & Bryant, R.A. (2015). The Sydney Handbook of Anxiety Disorders: A Guide to the Symptoms, Causes and Treatments of Anxiety Disorders. Sydney: The University of Sydney.
- Bryant, R.A. (2016). Acute Stress Disorder: What it is, and How to Treat it? New York: Guilford.

=== Journal articles ===
- Bryant, R.A. & Harvey, A.G. (1998). Relationship of acute stress disorder and posttraumatic stress disorder following mild traumatic brain injury. American Journal of Psychiatry, 155, 625–629.
- Bryant, R.A, et al. (1998). Treatment of acute stress disorder: A comparison of cognitive behavioral therapy and supportive counseling. Journal of Consulting and Clinical Psychology, 66, 862–866.
- Bryant, R.A., et al. (1998). Assessing acute stress disorder: Psychometric properties of a structured clinical interview. Psychological Assessment, 10, 215–220.
- Bryant, R.A., et al. (1999). Treating acute stress disorder: An evaluation of cognitive behavior therapy and counseling techniques. American Journal of Psychiatry, 156, 1780–1786.
- Bryant, R.A., et al. (2000). A prospective study of acute psychophysiological arousal, acute stress disorder, and posttraumatic stress disorder. Journal of Abnormal Psychology, 109, 341–344.
- Bryant, R.A., et al. (2008). Enhanced amygdala and medial prefrontal activation during nonconscious processing of fear in posttraumatic stress disorder: An fMRI study. Human Brain Mapping, 29, 517–523.
- Bryant, R.A., et al. (2008). Treatment of acute stress disorder: A randomized controlled trial. Archives of General Psychiatry, 65, 659–667.
- Bryant, R.A. (2008). Disentangling mild traumatic brain injury and stress reactions. New England Journal of Medicine, 358, 525–527.
- Bryant, R.A., et al. (2011). A randomized controlled effectiveness trial of cognitive behaviour therapy for post-traumatic stress disorder in terrorist-affected people in Thailand. World Psychiatry, 10, 205–209.
- Bryant, R.A., et al. (2013). A multi-site analysis of the fluctuating course of posttraumatic stress disorder. JAMA: Psychiatry, 70, 839–846.
- Bryant, R.A, et al. (2014). Treating prolonged grief disorder: A randomized controlled trial. JAMA: Psychiatry, 71, 1332–1339.
