= James Cook Medal =

The James Cook Medal is awarded on an occasional basis by the Royal Society of New South Wales for "outstanding contributions to science and human welfare in and for the Southern Hemisphere". It was established in 1947 from funds donated by Henry Ferdinand Halloran, a member of the Society.

== Recipients ==
Source: RSNSW

- 2025 Michelle Haber
- 2024 George Paxinos
- 2023 Helen Christensen
- 2022 John A Church
- 2021 Rose Amal
- 2020 Richard Bryant
- 2019 Matthew England
- 2018 Elizabeth Elliott
- 2017 Gordon Parker
- 2016 Professor David Cooper
- 2015 Professor Martin Green
- 2013 Professor Brien Holden
- 1999 Peter Colman
- 1994 Sir Gustav Nossal
- 1991 Graeme Milbourne Clark
- 1987 Phillip Garth Law
- 1985 Donald Metcalf
- 1984 Ronald Lawrie Huckstep
- 1979 Robert John Walsh
- 1978 Sir Lawrence J. Wackett
- 1977 I.A. Watson
- 1975 A. Walsh
- 1974 Sir Marcus L. Oliphant
- 1969 Lord Casey of Berwick
- 1966 Sir William Hudson
- 1965 Sir John Gunther
- 1964 M.R. Lemberg
- 1961 Sir John Eccles
- 1959 Albert Schweitzer
- 1956 Sir Ian Clunies Ross
- 1955 A.P. Elkin
- 1954 Sir Frank M. Burnet
- 1953 Sir David Rivett
- 1952 W.L. Waterhouse
- 1951 Sir Norman McAlister Gregg
- 1950 Sir Neil H. Fairley
- 1948 B.A. Houssay
- 1947 The Rt. Hon. J.C. Smuts

== See also ==
- List of general science and technology awards
- List of prizes named after people
