= Saeid Eslamian =

Iranian academic

Seyed Saeid Eslamian
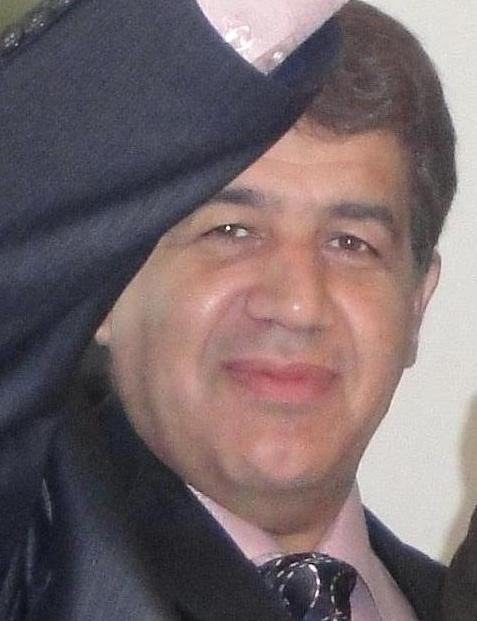
- Born: Isfahan, Iran
- Occupation: Full Professor
- Awards: ASCE (2009), EWRI (2010), IUT Distinguished Researcher (2013), Isfahan Province Distinguished Researcher (2015), NYAS-Wiley (2019), 2-Percent World Top Scientist (2019, 2021, 2022), Total Career World Top Scientist, (2023), CIS Extraordinary Professor (2024)
- Scientific career
- Fields: Hydrology; Water Resources; Climate Science; Water Reuse; Environmental Sustainability; Natural Hazard; Risk Management; Earth System Modeling Framework
- Workplaces: Isfahan University of Technology; University of New South Wales; Princeton University; ETH Zurich; McGill University
- Doctoral advisor: Prof. D. H. Pilgrim
- Website: ca.linkedin.com/in/profsaeideslamian

Saeid Eslamian is a full professor of Resilient Climate and Water Systems at Isfahan University of Technology in the Department of Water Science and Engineering. His research focuses mainly on statistical and environmental hydrology and climate change. In particular, he is working on forecasting natural hazards including flood, drought, storm, wind, pollution toward a sustainable environment. He is now the Director of Excellence in risk management and natural hazards. Formerly, he was a visiting professor at Princeton University, United States, university of ETH Zurich, Switzerland and McGill University, Montreal, Quebec, Canada. He has contributed to more than 600 publications in journals, books, or as technical reports. He is the founder and chief editor of International Journal of Hydrology Science and Technology. Currently, he has been the author of about 210 books and book chapters. Eslamian is the editorial board member and reviewer of about 100 Web of Science (ISI) Journals. Saeid is the editor of Journal of Hydrology (Elsevier)Journal of Hydrology, Ecohydrology and Hydrobiology (Elsevier), Journal of the Saudi Society of Agricultural Sciences (Elsevier), Journal of Water Reuse and Desalination (IWA).

He is a member of the following associations: American Society of Civil Engineers (ASCE), International Association of Hydrologic Science (IAHS), World Conservation Union (IUCN), GC Network for Drylands Research and Development (NDRD), International Association for Urban Climate (IAUC), International Society for Agricultural Meteorology, UK Chinese Association of Resources and Environment, Association of Water and Environment Modeling.

From 2010, Eslamian has started scientific collaboration internationally toward Sustainable Development and Ecological resilience. He is currently the head of International Collaboration for Environmental Sustainability (ICES) having about 1000 members including Professors, Directors, Sustainability Professionals, Policy Makers, Senior and Graduate Students.

== Biography ==
Saeid Eslamian was born in the city of Isfahan in 1961. His father was a miniaturist. He finished Hakimsanaei high school in Isfahan in 1979. After the Islamic Revolution, he was admitted to Isfahan University of Technology for B.S. Degree in water engineering. Eslamian graduated in 1986.

After his graduation, he was offered a scholarship for a master's degree at Tarbiat Modares University, Tehran. Eslamian finished his study in hydrology and water resources in 1989.

In 1991, he was awarded a grant for studying Ph.D. in civil engineering at the University of New South Wales, Australia. His supervisor was David H. Pilgrim, who encouraged Saeid for working on ‘Regional Flood Frequency Analysis Using a New Region of Influence Approach”.

After he obtained his PhD in 1995, he returned to Iran. Eslamian was employed by Isfahan University of Technology (IUT) upon arrival. In 2001, he was promoted to associate professor, and in 2014 to full professor. Eslamian was nominated for different positions in IUT including President Consultant, Faculty Deputy of Education, and head of department.

Eslamian had three sabbatical leaves in United States, Switzerland and Canada in 2006. 2008 and 2015 respectively. In the U.S., he was offered a position of visiting professor (visiting scholar) by Princeton University and worked jointly with Eric F. Wood from School of Engineering and Applied Sciences for one year. The outcome was a contribution in hydrological and agricultural drought interaction by developing multi-variate L-moments between soil moisture and low flows for northeastern U.S. streams.

Prof. Eslamian is an International Chief Editor for well known publisher companies such as Elsevier, Springer, Taylor and Francis, John Wiley & Sons and Nova Science Publishers. In late 2019, he was appointed as an Editor Adviser of Springer Nature Book Series.
