= Michelle King (journalist) =

South African born journalist, writer and women's rights activist

- Born: Michelle Penelope King
- Education: Cranfield School of Management (PhD) Massey University (MA); Auckland University of Technology (diploma); Australian Graduate School of Management (MBA)
- Occupations: Managing Director & Founder of The Culture Practice
- Employer: The Culture Practice
- Known for: women rights advocacy through UN Women’s Integrated Strategy for Gender Innovation & Global Innovation Coalition and publications about gender equality
- Website: Michelle Penelope King

Michelle Penelope King is a white South African born journalist, writer, women's rights activist and advocate for gender equality. Since December 2019, King has been director of inclusion at Netflix, a department responsible for inclusion and diversity among corporate employees.

== Biography ==
King attended Massey University in Palmerston North, New Zealand, and graduated with a M.A degree in psychology in 2005. In 2008, King completed a post-graduate diploma in journalism from Auckland University of Technology (AUT). King continued her study at Australian Graduate School of Management where she earned her master's degree in business administration in 2013, and then her PhD in the field of organization and gender at Cranfield School of Management in 2023.

King began her journalism career reading the news for George FM and freelance writing for the Independent Financial Review. She then pursued her work as a reporter for Breakfast Business and also worked as a television reporter for New Zealand's national news program and Radio New Zealand. She has written for TIME, Huffington Post, Forbes, Bloomberg L.P., and Harvard Business Review on topics related to gender and the advancement of women in organizations.

King also took several positions in human resources and gender equality and worked for the United Nations at UN Women in the area of communications, diversity and inclusion. In 2019 Women Tech Founders, a Chicago-based organization dedicated to advancing women in the tech industry, awarded King with the 2019 Inspiring Innovator Award, for her outstanding achievements in the sector.

During her PhD research, King conducted numerous interviews with the CEOs and corporate executives. They explained that the corporations expect their ideal employees to work long hours, be extrovert and not to have any social or family responsibilities. She learnt that most of the corporation work conditions match "masculine, aggressive" types of employees and are more suitable for white heterosexual men than for women or minorities. As a result, she launched "the Fix", a radio podcast illuminating gender inequality in corporate business culture and also explaining how to overcome different obstacles at work. Later, she wrote a book, The Fix Overcome the Invisible Barriers That Are Holding Women Back at Work, on the same subject. The book won Axiom Business Book Silver Award in the category "Women/Minorities in Business".

King is a member of the advisory board of Girl Up, a Washington D.C.–based foundation established by the United Nations.

== Book ==
- King, M. P. (2023). How Work Works: The Subtle Science of Getting Ahead Without Losing Yourself HarperBus
- King, M. P. (2020). The fix: Overcome the invisible barriers that are holding women back at work. S.l.: Simon & Schuster.

== Selected publications ==
- Thriving in a Male-Dominated Workplace, Harvard Business Review, December 27, 2022
- Women are better leaders. The pandemic proves it., CNN Business, May 5, 2020
- Julia Gillard, Australia’s First Female Prime Minister On Leadership, Education And The Misogyny Speech, Forbes, September 17, 2019
- Women Hit A Glass Ceiling Early In Their Careers, Here's How To Break It, Forbes, Dec 5, 2018
- Is Office Politics a White Man’s Game? by Michelle King, David Denyer and Emma Parry, Harvard Business Review, September 12, 2018
- We need to stop fixing women and start fixing workplaces by Michelle King, Evoke.org, October 10, 2019
- Building a Better Workplace: Business Books 2019–2020 by Daniel Lefferts, Publishers Weekly, November 22, 2019
- #MeToo’s Legacy by Nicole Torres, Harvard Business Review, January-February 2020
- HBR Podcast: Gender Equality Issues by Daniel Lefferts, Harvard Business Review: Dear HBR Podcast – Episode 51, December 26, 2019
- IHRSA: Club Business International by Craig R. Waters, February 2020
- Axiom Business Book Awards - 2020 Axiom Business Book Awards – 2020
- Like them or not, Elizabeth Warren and Amy Klobuchar represent the future of leadership by Michelle King, Salon.com, February 21, 2020
