= Kirby Institute =

Australian medical research centre

The Kirby Institute
- Formation: 1986
- Type: Medical research institute
- Location: Wallace Wurth Building, High St, Kensington NSW 2052
- Region served: Australia, Asia-Pacific
- Affiliations: University of New South Wales
- Budget: $39 million (2018)
- Staff: approx. 350
- Website: www.kirby.unsw.edu.au
- Formerly called: National Centre in HIV Epidemiology and Clinical Research

The Kirby Institute (formerly the National Centre in HIV Epidemiology and Clinical Research) is a medical research organisation affiliated with the University of New South Wales and based on UNSW's Kensington campus. Founded in 1986, its initial research focus on HIV/AIDS has expanded over time to include viral hepatitis, sexually transmitted infections and a range of other infectious diseases.

The institute's inaugural director was Professor David A. Cooper.

== History ==
=== National Centre in HIV Epidemiology and Clinical Research (1986–2011) ===
The National Centre in HIV Epidemiology and Clinical Research (NCHECR) was founded in 1986 in response to the emerging HIV/AIDS epidemic in Australia. Start-up funding was provided by the Australian federal government with the goal of reducing the national burden of the epidemic. The centre was later supported by ongoing funding from the federal government, the New South Wales state government and the University of New South Wales, in addition to one-off grants from, among others, the Bill & Melinda Gates Foundation and the Atlantic Philanthropies.

=== Kirby Institute (2011–present) ===
In April 2011, on the organisation's 25th anniversary, the NCHECR was renamed the Kirby Institute for infection and immunity in society, with a new focus on behavioural-related infectious diseases affecting "marginalised, disempowered and other communities". The new name was taken in honour of Michael Kirby, a former Justice of the High Court of Australia and an outspoken supporter of human rights, health promotion, and HIV/AIDS research. In 2013, Kirby accepted the role of Patron of the institute.

In 2018 the Kirby Institute employed and supported approximately 350 researchers and students and is operating research studies in Australia and worldwide. Outside of Australia, the institute is engaged in disease prevention in countries including Thailand, Indonesia, Myanmar, the Solomon Islands, Fiji and Papua New Guinea. The Kirby Institute is one of Australia's four national HIV research centres; the others are the Australian Centre for HIV and Hepatitis Virology Research, the Australian Research Centre in Sex, Health and Society (ARCSHS), and the National Centre in for Social Research in Health.

== See also ==
- Health in Australia
