= Stuart Fuller =

Australian lawyer (born 1966)

- Born: 7 October 1966 (age 59); Sydney, Australia
- Education: Newington College; UNSW
- Occupation: Solicitor

Stuart Raymond Fuller is an Australian lawyer. He is the National Leader, KPMG Law, at KPMG Australia. Previously, he was a partner in the banking & finance team at law firm King & Wood Mallesons.

== Biography ==
Fuller was born in Sydney and attended Newington College (1979–1984). He was awarded Bachelor of Commerce and Laws degrees by the University of New South Wales in 1990. From 1990 until 1997 he was a solicitor with Mallesons Stephen Jaques in Sydney, when he was appointed partner. In 2006 he was appointed managing partner and in 2012 he was named Global Managing Partner of the merged firm King & Wood Mallesons, a position he held until the end of 2016 before returning to practice.
