= Glenn Sorensen =

Glenn Sorensen (b. 1968) is an artist born in Australia who now lives and works in Sweden. He studied at the City Art Institute, Sydney, Australia between 1986 and 1988 and at the Academy of Fine Arts, Helsinki, Finland.
