= Sally Bennett =

Australian fencer

- Born: 10 June 1979 (age 47); Sydney, Australia
- Education: Randwick Public School and Randwick Girls Technology High School, University of New South Wales and a Masters in International Business at the University of Sydney
- Occupation: Australian sabre fencer
- Years active: 2013–present
- Height: 5 ft 4 in (163 cm)

Sally Bennett (born 10 June 1979) is an Australian sabre fencer. She won the gold medal at the 2013 Oceania Fencing Championships for women's sabre., after beating her New Zealand opponent 15-6 In 2014, she was inducted into the Randwick City Council Hall of Sporting Champions for her lifetime commitment to sport.

== Personal ==
Bennett was born in Sydney, Australia. She attended Randwick Public School and Randwick Girls Technology High School. She completed a Bachelor of Arts/Bachelor of Education at the University of New South Wales and a Masters in International Business at the University of Sydney. She trained as a language teacher in French and German, and worked in Paris as a Communication Manager and Canada as a ski instructor. She has authored five books, four of which belong to the Rabs & Ted travel series for children.

== Fencing career ==
Bennett began fencing at her current club, the University of Sydney Fencing Club, in 2011. She was Club Champion in 2012, 2013 and 2014. She has been a member of the New South Wales State Squad 2012-2015, the Australian Fencing Squad 2012-2013 and Australian Fencing team 2013–present. Bennett represented Australia at the 2014 Commonwealth Fencing Championships in Scotland, the 2014 World Fencing Championships in Kazan and the 2015 World Fencing Championships in Moscow.

She was injured for the majority of the 2015–2016 season due to torn patella tendons. Operations were undertaken concurrently on both knees on 8 October 2015. Since 2013, Bennett has been a Sports Ambassador for the New South Wales Premier’s Sporting Challenge, visiting schools to talk to students about the importance of exercise, healthy eating and what it takes to become a champion.

She currently lives in Sydney, Australia.
