= Barbara Cleveland =

Australian performance art collective

Barbara Cleveland is an Australian contemporary performance art collective who primarily work on Gadigal land in Sydney, Australia. Barbara Cleveland's works examine the histories of visual and performing arts and are informed by queer and feminist theories.

== History ==
The members of the group are Diana Baker Smith, Frances Barrett, Kate Blackmore, and Kelly Doley. The artists started their collaborative practice in 2005 while studying at the College of Fine Art at the University of New South Wales. Since 2011, the collective have produced an ongoing series of work which explores the life and legacy of Barbara Cleveland: a mythical Australian performance artist who was active in the 1970s and who disappeared in 1981. The group previously worked under the title ‘Brown Council’ then ‘Barbara Cleveland Institute’ before taking the name ‘Barbara Cleveland’ in 2016.

== Selected performances and presentations ==
In 2020, Barbara Cleveland's first solo exhibition in a public gallery, Thinking Business was presented at Goulburn Regional Art Gallery. The exhibition was curated by Gina Mobayed the then Director of Gallery and it went on to tour nationally with the support of Museums & Galleries of NSW.

- 20th Biennale of Sydney
- 2018 Adelaide Biennial
- Art Gallery of NSW (Sydney)
- Museum of Contemporary Art (Sydney)
- Artspace (Sydney)
- Australian Experimental Art Foundation (Adelaide)
- Performance Space (Sydney)
- Monash University Museum of Art (Melbourne)
- The Physics Room (Christchurch)
- National Museum of Modern and Contemporary Art (Seoul).

== Collections ==
Their works are held in the permanent collections of Artbank, Museum of Contemporary Art Australia, the Art Gallery of New South Wales, Campbelltown Arts Centre, Monash University Museum of Art and the Gallery of Modern Art, Brisbane.
