= UNSW Business School =

Business school of the University of New South Wales

- Former name: Australian School of Business
- Type: Business school
- Established: 2006
- Parent institution: University of New South Wales
- Affiliations: Australian Graduate School of Management
- Faculty: 350+
- Administrative staff: 218
- Students: 13,012
- Location: Sydney, Australia; 33.916867°S 151.229897°E
- Website: www.business.unsw.edu.au

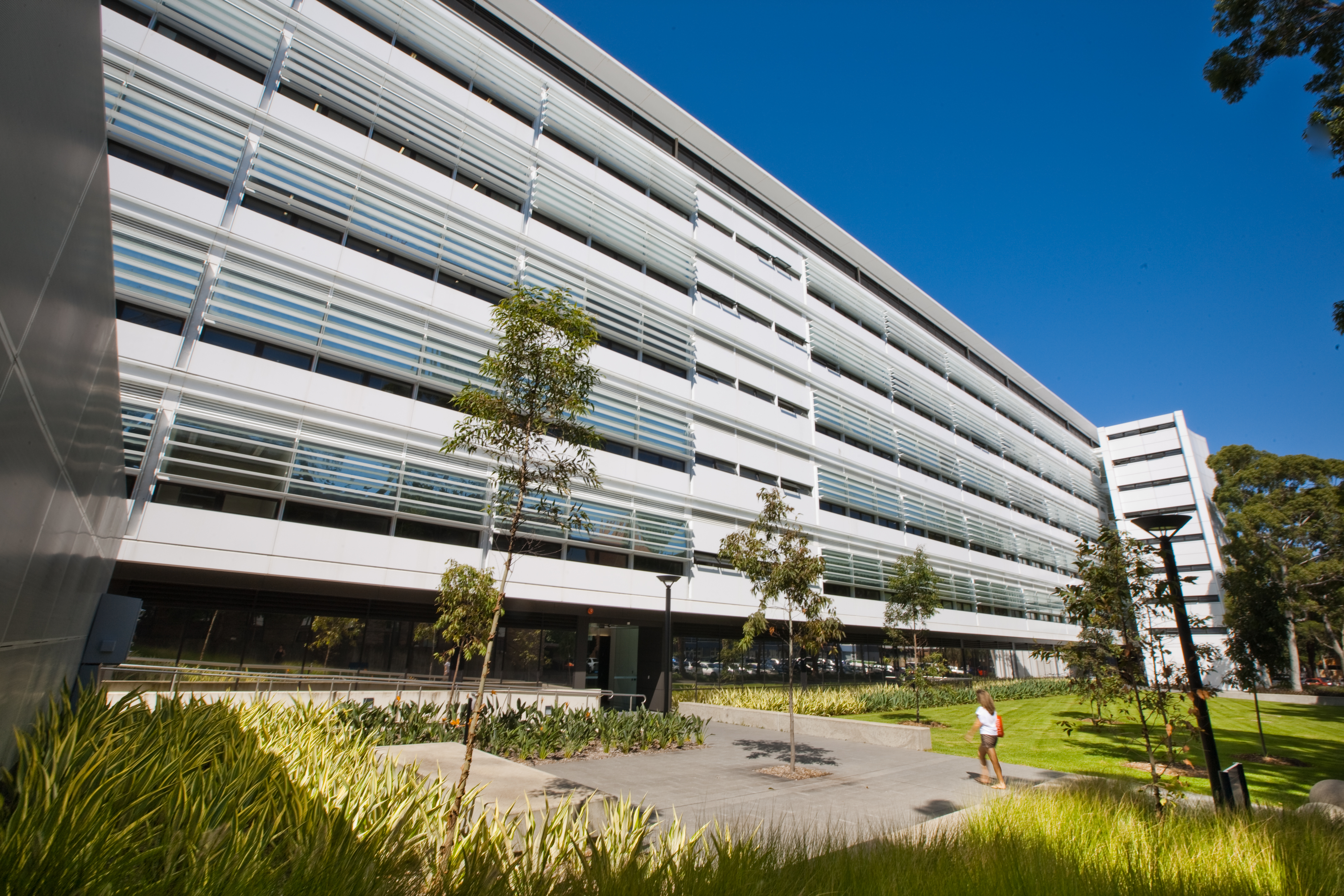
Faculty building

The UNSW Business School at the University of New South Wales is a business school located in Sydney, Australia. The school offers 42 programs, including 26 undergraduate and 26 specialist master's degrees, as well as six MBA and executive programs through the Australian Graduate School of Management.

It was named the Australian School of Business (ASB), between 2007 and 2014.

== History ==
Accountancy, the first school of the Faculty of Commerce, began operations in 1955. The first graduate of UNSW Business School in 1959 was Langer Avery. The Faculty of Commerce was then formed formally in 1957 — later renamed the Faculty of Commerce and Economics in 1988. In 1977, the Australian Graduate School of Management (AGSM) was established.

In 2006, the Faculty of Commerce and Economics and the AGSM merged to form what was initially known as the Faculty of Business, before being renamed the Australian School of Business (ASB) in 2007. In 2014, the ASB was renamed the UNSW Business School.

Professor Chris Styles became Dean of UNSW Business School at UNSW Australia on 1 July 2014.

The Business School is guided by its Business Advisory Council, comprising 51 industry leaders and chaired by Nicholas Moore, CEO and Managing Director of Macquarie Group Ltd.

In addition to the Australian Graduate School of Management, there are seven disciplinary schools within the UNSW Business School:

- School of Accounting, Auditing and Taxation
- School of Banking & Finance
- School of Economics
- School of Information Systems and Technology Management
- School of Management and Governance
- School of Marketing
- School of Risk & Actuarial.

== Enrolments ==
In 2014, the UNSW Business School had 14,519 students enrolled: 8,283 undergraduate and 5,854 postgraduate students. 2% of its students are in research.

41% of all UNSW Business School students are international students, with the largest proportion of international students coming from China, Hong Kong and Indonesia.

== Rankings ==
From 2007 to 2014 UNSW Business School was ranked by the Financial Times as having the best full-time MBA program in the country. The school's primary undergraduate degree, the Bachelor of Commerce, has the highest Australian high school entry score for a business undergraduate program in Australia. The 2022 QS World University Rankings ranked UNSW 20th in the World for Accounting and Finance (1st in Australia). In the 2022 ARWU Global Academic Subject Rankings UNSW is ranked 29th in the World for Finance (1st in Australia) and 51-75th in the World for Management. In the 2022 University Ranking by Academic Performance, UNSW is ranked 10th in the world for Commerce, Management, Tourism and Services and 18th globally for Business. In 2022 SCImago Institutions Rankings UNSW is ranked 11th in the World for Business, Management and Accounting and 33rd the World for Economics, Econometrics and Finance. According to latest 2021 KUBS worldwide business research rankings, UNSW is ranked 1st worldwide for Finance and 27th globally for Management. In the 2021 CFAR Rankings by Olin Business School at Washington University in St. Louis, UNSW is ranked 16th in the World for Finance and 9th in the World for Business by Total Outcome/Output indicator of research excellence The 2019 Apollo Communications Australian Top 50 CEO Report found that UNSW has educated more CEOs of Australia's top 50 companies than any other university in Australia and has produced more technology entrepreneurs in the past 20 years than any other Australian university, and has the largest number of millionaire alumni of any other university in Australia.

== Professional accreditation ==
The UNSW Business School was awarded EQUIS accreditation in June 2010. It has also been awarded accreditation from AACSB International.

Its programs are also accredited by professional bodies in most disciplines, including:

- CPA Australia
- Chartered Accountants Australia + New Zealand (CAANZ) (formerly known as Institute of Chartered Accountants in Australia, ICAA)
- Institute of Public Accountants (IPA)
- Institute of Actuaries of Australia
- Institute of Actuaries (London)
- Australian Human Resources Institute (AHRI)
- Australian Computer Society (ACS)
- Australian Market and Social Research Society (AMSRS)
- Australian Marketing Institute (AMI)

The School is also a signatory to the UN Principles of Responsible Management Education (PRME).

== Alumni and industry links ==
The UNSW Business School has over 83,000 alumni.

In 2014, the UNSW Business School provided 242 students with scholarships, adding up to a total value of $3,087,752. Additionally, 64 students received prizes valued at a total of $32,000.

== See also ==
- Australian Economics and Business Studies Competition
