= Rose Amal =

21st-century Indonesian-Australian chemical engineer

Prof. Rose Amal AC FAA FTSE FIChemE FIEAust
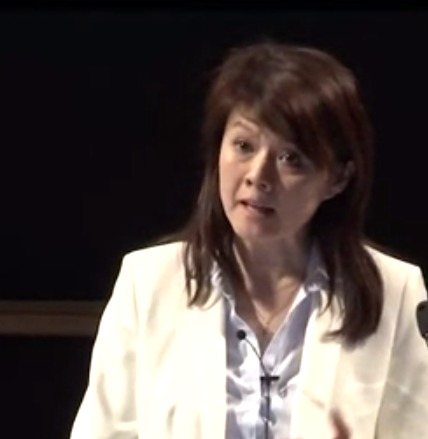
- June 2014
- Born: 1965 (age 60–61); Medan, Indonesia
- Title: Scientia Professor
- Awards: Australian Laureate Fellowship (2014); James Cook Medal (2021)

Academic background
- Education: UNSW
- Thesis: Fractal structure and kinetics of aggregating colloidal hematite (1991)

Academic work
- Discipline: Chemical Engineering
- Sub-discipline: Nanoparticles and catalysis research
- Website: http://www.pcrg.unsw.edu.au/staff/rose-amal

Rose Amal AC (born 1965) is an Australian chemical engineer, currently serving as Scientia Professor and ARC Laureate Fellow in the School of Chemical Engineering at the University of New South Wales, Australia, where she is the director of the Particles and Catalysis Research Group. Previously she was director of the ARC Centre of Excellence for Functional Nanomaterials (2010–2013). From 2012 to 2015 she was named in the Engineers Australia list of Australia's Top 100 Most Influential Engineers. In 2014 she became the first female engineer elected a Fellow of the Australian Academy of Science.

== Education ==
Amal was born in Medan, Indonesia and moved to Australia in October 1983 after finishing high school. She completed a Bachelor of Engineering majoring in Chemical Engineering at the University of New South Wales in 1988, and received her PhD in chemical engineering in 1991. From 1992, she was a lecturer in the School of Chemical Engineering before becoming director of the Centre for Particle and Catalyst Technologies (later Particles and Catalysis Research Group) in 1997. She became a full professor in 2004.

== Research ==
Photocatalysis – from material design to engineering reactor system. Presentation given by Professor Amal on the occasion of her being elected a Fellow of the Australian Academy of Science, 2014

External videos
- Rose Amal – Sustainable Fuels from the Sun. Published by UNSW, 12 April 2015

Throughout her career, Alma's work has been focused on "fine particle aggregation, photocatalysis, nanoparticle synthesis" and their applications in areas such as the control of water pollution and air quality, clean energy technologies and biotechnology. She is particularly interested in designing nanomaterials and engineering systems for solar and chemical energy conversion applications. Some of her most cited works include a review on the role of nanoparticles in photocatalysis and a study on a bismuth vanadate-reduced graphene oxide composite for enhanced photoelectrochemical water splitting.

The short citation made in the year of Amal's election to Fellowship of the Australian Academy of Science stated:

Professor Amal is a world leader in photocatalysis. Her photocatalysis research addresses the core issues of energy and water, two highly critical resources in Australian as well as worldwide. Her research provides an ultimately clean solution by efficiently harnessing solar energy to purify water or/and generate H2. In particular, her highly active, stable and recyclable photocatlysts [sic] have paved the way for the sustainable use of photocatalysis in large industrial scale water treatment plants. Held in the highest regard nationally and internationally, her passion for both science and engineering has let [sic] to creating critical scientific knowledge and delivering significant engineering outcomes.

== Recognition ==
Amal was appointed as a member of the ARC College of Experts on the Environmental Science and Engineering panel in 2007 and served as chair in 2009. From 2008 to 2010 she was the Inaugural Director of the Centre for Energy Research and Policy Analysis and in 2012 she was the chair of the ARC–ERA Research Evaluation Committee in the Engineering and Environmental Sciences Cluster. From 2010 to 2013 she was director of the ARC Centre of Excellence for Functional Nanomaterials. Amal is a Fellow of Australian Academy of Technological Sciences and Engineering (FTSE) and the Australian Academy of Science (FAA).

In addition to being named in the list of Australia's Top 100 Most Influential Engineers in 2012, 2013, 2014 and 2015, Amal has received several awards including:

- 2008 Freehills Innovation Award in Chemical Engineering
- 2011 NSW Science and Engineering Award – Emerging Research
- 2012 Judy Raper Women in Engineering Leadership Award
- 2012 ExxonMobil Award
- 2014 Australian Laureate Fellowship
- 2019 NSW Scientist of the Year
- 2021 James Cook Medal

In the 2018 Queen's Birthday Honours, Amal was named a Companion of the Order of Australia.
