= Rosalyn Diprose =

Philosopher

- Born: Australia

Education
- Education: University of Technology Sydney (B.App.Sc. 1976); The University of Sydney (BA (Hons I) 1986); UNSW Sydney (PhD 1992)

Philosophical work
- Era: Contemporary philosophy
- Region: Western philosophy
- School: Continental
- Main interests: Feminist philosophy Critical Phenomenology; Biopolitics
- Notable ideas: ontological concept of 'corporeal generosity' as the basis of ethics

Rosalyn Diprose is Emeritus Professor of philosophy at University of New South Wales. Engagement with her published research in Philosophy (sub categories (Comparative) Literature and Gender Studies) has placed her on Stanford University's "World Top 2% of Scientists" list for the years 2025, 2022, and 2021. Diprose is best known for the interdisciplinary application of her unique concept of "corporeal generosity" developed through engagement with existential phenomenology (particularly Merleau-Ponty and Levinas), the Continental philosophies of Nietzsche, Foucault, and Arendt, and numerous feminist philosophies of embodiment. She has been recognised for her contributions to scholarship on these philosophers. Her concept of "corporeal generosity" is now considered to be seminal in the emerging field of Critical Phenomenology.

Biography and Career

Diprose was raised on a family farm in mid-Western NSW (on "unceded" Wiradjuri country). After graduating with a degree in Biomedical Science from the University of Technology Sydney in 1976, she worked for 2 years in pharmacology research in Sydney and 3 years for Top Deck Travel in London and Sydney in administrative and managerial roles, before undertaking a liberal Arts degree in Philosophy and History at The University of Sydney (1982-1986). She completed a PhD in Philosophy at UNSW Sydney under the supervision of Prof.Genevieve Lloyd (1987-1991). Her dissertation is entitled: "Ethics and the Body of Woman: Hegel, Nietzsche, Heidegger".

Diprose was the first woman appointed as a full-time lecturer in Philosophy at Flinders University of South Australia (1991-1994), before taking up a tenured position in the School of Philosophy at UNSW Sydney in 1994. During her academic career she has also held fully funded visiting professorships at several institutions, including in the Department of Philosophy at Rhodes University, South Africa in 2002, in Human Geography, the Open University UK in 2006; and the Humanities Institute at SUNY Buffalo USA in 2014. She held the posts of Deputy Head of School and Research Coordinator for the School of History and Philosophy at UNSW (2009-2012). Diprose was awarded the "UNSW Vice Chancellor's Award for Excellence in Teaching for Postgraduate Supervision" in 2009 and went on to oversee 20 successful PhD completions as primary supervisor in 15 years 1998-2014.

Development of "Corporeal Generosity" as an Ontological Concept and a Basis for Ethics

In her first book, The Bodies of Women (1994), Diprose, as Alexandra Howson explains, broke new ground by developing a feminist ethics from a combination of two ideas in Continental philosophy: (1) Foucault's approach that takes up the Ancient Greek concept of "ethos" as one's embodied "manner of being" and ethics as a "practice of freedom" or "technique of self", and (2) Irigaray and Derrida's notions of relational and irreducible difference generated within sociality. In that book, Diprose also begins her entry into biopolitical critique by applying her feminist ethics to analyses of the erasure of plurality in biomedical discourses and practices in human reproduction and genetics. At the same time she prefigures the later idea of generosity by positing ontological pre-conscious gift-giving, as opposed to utilitarianism and social contract, as the basis of sociality. Through published scholarship on the philosophies of Merleau-Ponty, Levinas, and Arendt from the early 2000s, Diprose developed her mature concept of corporeal generosity. Diprose summarises her fully-developed concept of corporeal generosity in the "ontological sense as openness toward, or being-given to, others characteristic of human subjectivity [and] interrelationality", which is imbued with affectivity and is the basis of ethics. Veera Kinnunen explains the ethical and political dimensions of Diprose's concept in a chapter of her book devoted to the topic: "being open to difference is the basis of community" with the human and non-human. Other commentators, such as Marsha Meskimmon, elaborate the reasons why this openness to unknowable and irrepressible difference matters: rather than a moral principle, generosity, so understood, is the basis of corporeal self-hood, inter-subjectivity (affecting and being affected by others), communication, innovation, and agency. Conversely, foreclosing the other's difference (alterity) is the path to injustice and totalitarianism. Diprose makes this point in detail throughout her published research with respect to gender and race relations, most recently in the book Arendt, Natality and Biopolitics (2019). Meskimmon uses the idea of corporeal generosity in her approach to aesthetics to develop her own idea of "cosmopolitan imagination [as the] key to engendering a global sense of ethical and political responsibility" (ibid. p. 7). Other theorists use Diprose's concept of corporeal generosity to develop an ethics of generosity applicable to a range of fields including issues in human reproduction (eg. Hird 2007), environmental ethics (eg. Hawkins, 2006 and Lorimer, 2015), "geographies of generosity" (eg. Barnett & Land 2007, Yusoff 2013), and business and organisation ethics (eg. Kinnunen, 2022; Hancock, 2008; various by A. Pullen eg 2021).

== See also ==
- Biopolitics

== Selected Bibliography ==
In order of most cited and discussed:

- Diprose, Rosalyn, (BOOK) Corporeal Generosity: On Giving with Nietzsche, Merleau-Ponty, and Levinas, SUNY, 2002, ISBN 0791453219 Selected by a panel of experts for "book discussion session" at the 42nd annual meeting of the Society for Phenomenology and Existential Philosophy (SPEP) in Boston in 2003 (https://www.spep.org/website/wp-content/uploads/2010/09/Program2003)
- Diprose, Rosalyn, (BOOK)The Bodies of Women: Ethics, Embodiment and Sexual Difference, Routledge, London, 1994, ISBN 978-0-415-09783-3
- Rosalyn Diprose and Jack Reynolds (eds. BOOK), Merleau-Ponty: Key Concepts, Acumen, 2008, ISBN 9781844651160
- Diprose, Rosalyn, "Corporeal Interdependence: From Vulnerability to dwelling in ethical community", SubStance: A Review of Theory and Literary Criticism, #132, 42(3), 2013, pp. 185–204
- Diprose, Rosalyn, N Stephenson, K Race, C Mills, G Hawkins, "Governing the future: Political Technologies of Risk Management", Security Dialogue, 39(2), 2008, pp. 267–288
- Diprose, Rosalyn & E. Ziarek, (BOOK) Arendt, Natailty and Biopolitics, Edinburgh University Press, 2018, ISBN 978-1-4744-4434-7 Awarded the "Symposium Book Prize 2019" by the Canadian Society for Continental Philosophy
- Diprose, Rosalyn. "Nietzsche, Ethics & sexual Difference", Radical Philosophy, 52, 1989. pp27–33 (reprinted twice in edited collections of essays on Nietzsche's philosophy, most recently in Richard White (ed), Nietzsche, 2002 ISBN 978-1-138-74188-1
- Diprose, Rosalyn. "Biopolitical technologies of prevention", Health Sociology Review, 17(2), 2008, pp 141–150
