= Louise Maple-Brown =

Australian endocrinologist and clinical researcher

Louise Maple-Brown FAHMS

Personal details
- Occupation: Endocrinologist

Louise Maple-Brown is an Australian endocrinologist. She is a clinical researcher at the Royal Darwin Hospital (Northern Territory, Australia), serving as the hospital's Head of Endocrinology and as NHMRC Practitioner Fellow with the Menzies School of Health Research at Charles Darwin University. She leads a clinical research program within the Wellbeing and Preventable Chronic Diseases division of Menzies with a focus on diabetes in Indigenous Australians and provides clinical diabetes services to urban and remote Northern Territory communities.

== Education ==
Maple-Brown completed her Bachelor of Medicine, Bachelor of Surgery at the University of Sydney and PhD at the University of New South Wales. She completed her physician and endocrinology training at St Vincent's Hospital, Sydney then moved to Darwin in 2002.

== Research ==
Maple-Brown is the lead investigator on multiple projects that are funded by the National Health and Medical Research Council (NHMRC). She is Chief Investigator of the Northern Territory & FNQ Diabetes in Pregnancy Partnership to improve care and outcomes for women with diabetes in pregnancy and their babies. She has also served as Chief Investigator on two phases of a study on the kidney disease prevalence, determinants interventions in Indigenous Australians since 2012.

She was elected a Fellow of the Australian Academy of Health and Medical Sciences in 2021.
