= Gordon Hanley =

Australian visual artist

- Born: 9 September 1954 (age 72); Southport, England
- Education: University of New South Wales; University of Queensland
- Style: Photorealism

Gordon Hanley (born 9 September 1954) is an Australian visual artist based in Brisbane, Queensland, who paints in the realist and photorealist art style. A self-taught artist, his art mainly consists of paintings, drawings and masks. He creates watercolours of mainly urban scenes of small town Australia and highly detailed paintings of birds. More recently he has become involve din silverpoint drawing as well. Most of his recent work features drawings in 24ct gold and pure silver on paper with prepared grounds of his own design and development. His current work in this medium features in photorealist style.

== Education and early life ==
Hanley was born in Southport, England and migrated to Australia with his parents in May 1960 as part of the assisted passage scheme. His family lived in Melbourne, Brisbane, and Sydney, followed by Park Ridge. He attended Beaudesert State High School (rural SE Queensland) and Randwick State High School (Sydney).

Hanley attended the University of New South Wales and then University of Queensland and holds a BSc, B.A. and Dip Ed. He served five years in the Royal Australian Navy. He then worked as a high school teacher while developing artistic skill and a portfolio.

== Art ==
Hanley first exhibited his work 1988 at the Kenmore Gallery in Brisbane. In 1990 he held a solo exhibition of 40 watercolours there, and mounted a second one a year later. At the age of 37, Hanley then became a full-time artist. During the next decade he created about than 50 prints in open and limited edition format, after which he was Artist in residence at Queensland Museum. He joined the Royal Queensland Watercolour Society and the Queensland Wildlife Society.

Beginning in 2009, Hanley began to create drawings in metalpoint. After creating a number of works in the tradition of silverpoint drawing, he began to incorporate with gold as well. His work was featured in Australian Artist Magazine, and Artist's Palette. for which he later wrote several articles about his technique.

In 2014 Hanley's work was on display at Morpeth Gallery, NSW and the Aarwun Gallery in Canberra.

== Exhibitions ==
- Kenmore Gallery Brisbane - 1998, 1990, 1991
- La Trobe ArtSpace Brisbane - 1992
- Ronald Coles Gallery Sydney - 1993, 1995
- Morpeth Gallery Hunter Valley - 1998, 2000, 2007, 2009, 2010, 2012
- Aarwun Gallery Canberra - 2001, 2011
- Galloway Gallery Brisbane - 2002
- Arthouse Gallery Brisbane - 2004
- Astras Gallery Gold Coast - 2010

== Book ==
- Jewels Of Nature: The Parrots ISBN 0-646-41597-2 features over 120 paintings of parrots.
