= David Cooper (immunologist) =

Australian immunologist (1949–2018)

David Cooper AO FRACP FRCP FAA FAHMS

Personal details
- Born: David Albert Cooper; 19 April 1949
- Died: 18 March 2018 (aged 68) Sydney, Australia
- Occupation: Immunologist

David Albert Cooper AO (19 April 1949 – 18 March 2018) was an Australian HIV/AIDS researcher, immunologist, professor at the University of New South Wales, and the director of the Kirby Institute. He and Professor Ron Penny diagnosed the first case of HIV in Australia.

== Education ==
Born in 1949 to Eastern European Jewish immigrants, Cooper attended the Cranbrook School, graduating aged 15, then attended the University of Sydney, graduating with a Bachelor of Science in 1969 and an MBBS from Sydney Medical School in 1972. After completing his residency and fellowships in internal medicine (immunology) and pathology (immunology) at St Vincent's Hospital, he was awarded a postgraduate research scholarship by the University of New South Wales to study immunology.

== Career ==
In 1975, Cooper went to Tucson, Arizona, where he was a research fellow at the University of Arizona Medical Center. He then returned to St Vincent's Hospital in Sydney and was promoted to an immunology staff specialist position in 1979.

Cooper travelled to Boston, Massachusetts and worked as a research fellow in cancer immunology in 1981—the beginning of the outbreak of HIV/AIDS in the United States. Having seen the symptoms of HIV/AIDS in young gay men in the US, Cooper returned to Australia and resumed his role at St Vincent's Hospital, where he recognised the same illness in young Australian men who had recently travelled to the US. He is credited, together with Professor Ron Penny, with diagnosing the first case of HIV in Australia, in 1982 and published a seminal case series on HIV seroconversion illness in The Lancet in 1985. He also reported the first observation of HIV transmission during breastfeeding in the world in 1985. He was awarded a Doctor of Medicine by UNSW in 1983 and was appointed a senior lecturer at the university in 1986. In the same year he was named director of the newly founded National Centre in HIV Epidemiology and Clinical Research (now the Kirby Institute).

In 1991, he was named chair of the WHO Global Program on AIDS committee on clinical research and drug development, and in 1994 he was appointed full professor and awarded a Doctor of Science by UNSW. In 1996 he and two other HIV/AIDS researchers, Joep Lange from the Netherlands and Praphan Phanuphak from Thailand, founded a research centre in Bangkok named HIV-NAT (HIV Netherlands Australia Thailand Research Collaboration). Cooper, Lange and Phanuphak also established a program to increase access to antiretroviral drugs to treat HIV in Cambodia.

Cooper was director of the Kirby Institute from its establishment in 1986 until his death. He was also a past president of the International AIDS Society.

== Personal life ==
Cooper was married with two daughters.

He died at St Vincent's Hospital in Sydney on 18 March 2018 after suffering for a short period from a rare autoimmune inflammatory disease.

== Honours ==
Cooper was appointed an Officer of the Order of Australia (AO) in 2003 "for service to medicine as a clinician, researcher, and leading contributor to HIV/AIDS research, and to the development of new treatment approaches". He was elected a Fellow of the Australian Academy of Science (FAA) in 2007 and an inaugural Fellow of the Australian Academy of Health and Medical Sciences (FAHMS) in 2015. In 2016, he was awarded the James Cook Medal by the Royal Society of New South Wales.

In 2017, his accomplishments were acknowledged by a motion in the Australian Senate. In recognition of his life's work Cooper was posthumously appointed Companion of the Order of Australia (AC) in the 2018 Queens's Birthday Honours for "eminent service to medicine, particularly in the area of HIV/AIDS research, as a clinician, scientist and administrator, to the development of treatment therapies, and to health programs in South East Asia and the Pacific".
