= Julie Cairney =

Australian engineer and materials researcher

Julie M Cairney
- Born: Julie M Cairney
- Education: University of New South Wales (BEng, PhD)
- Scientific career
- Fields: Microstructural Characterisation; Materials science
- Workplaces: University of Sydney
- Thesis: (2002)
- Doctoral advisor: Paul Munroe
- Website: sydney.edu.au/engineering/people/julie.cairney.php

Julie M. Cairney is the pro vice chancellor - research enterprise and professor in the School of Aerospace, Mechanical and Mechatronic Engineering at the University of Sydney. She is an expert in microscopy, focusing on the understanding and characterization of materials used for structural applications, renewable energy, medical science and geosciences including the use and development of the atom probe microscope.

Julie serves on the board of Cicada Innovations and Uniseed.

== Early life and education ==
Cairney grew up in Broken Hill, an outback town in Australia. She studied for her Bachelor of Metallurgical Engineering (physical metallurgy) at the University of New South Wales sponsored by Pasminico Limited and graduated in 1998. Subsequently, she undertook PhD studies with Professor Paul Munroe also at the University of New South Wales and completed her PhD in 2007.

== Research ==
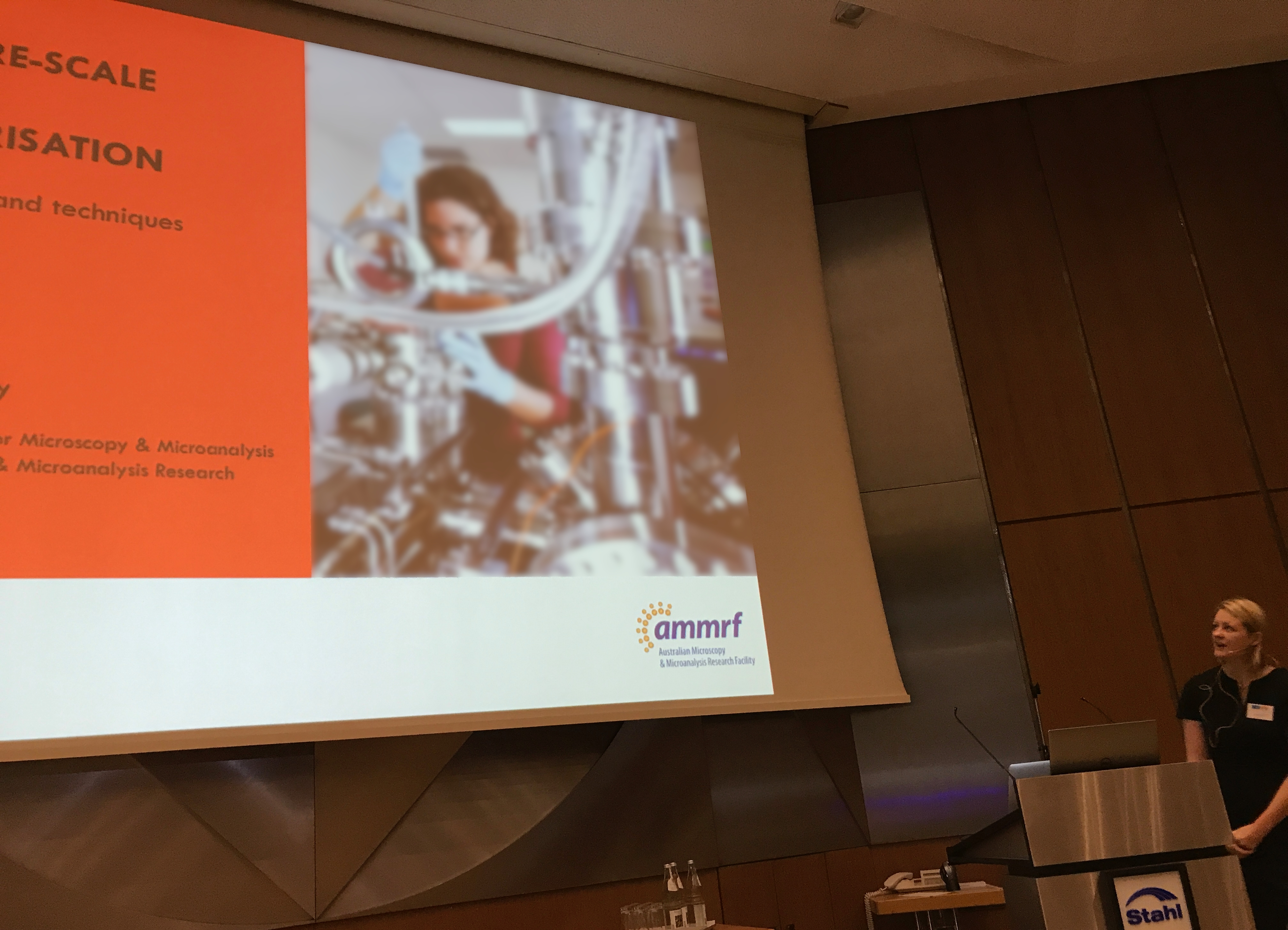
Julie Cairney, right, during the symposium for the 100 year anniversary of the Max-Planck-Institute für Eisenforschung, Düsseldorf

After her PhD, in 2001-2002 Cairney undertook a Royal Academy of Engineering funded research fellowship with Professor Ian Jones at the University of Birmingham. In 2002, she was a Vice Chancellor's Post-doctoral Fellow with Prof. Mark Hoffman at the University of New South Wales, with a stint as a visiting scientist in 2004 with Professor Manfred Rühle at the Max Planck Institute in Stuttgart. In 2006, Cairney moved to the University of Sydney as a Lecturer and established a materials characterisation group. Since moving Cairney has occupied the role of Associate Dean Talented Students Program Showcase in the Faculty of Science, the Director of the Sydney Microscopy and Microanalayis and Head of Research for the School of Aerospace, Mechanical and Mechatronic Engineering. In service to the microscopy community, since 2014 Cairney serves on the Advisory Board for the Journal "Ultramicroscopy" and since 2014 she serves on the International Steering Committee for the International Field Emission Society (IFES) and currently is Vice-President of IFES. Her research spans materials science, medicine, and geosciences, with recent applications which enable the understanding of the structure of tooth enamel as well as advanced materials for mining. Cairney is one of the youngest full professors at the University of Sydney and one of the few female professors of engineering in Australia. Cairney has also served on the Australian Research Council College of Experts and the New Zealand Marsden Fund.

=== Previous roles ===
- Director of the Australian Centre for Microscopy and Microanalysis
- CEO of Microscopy Australia, a national user facility funded by the National Collaborative Research Infrastructure Strategy (NCRIS).

=== Awards ===
Her awards include:

- 2005 JSPS Short-Term Fellowship
- 2022 Eureka Prize finalist for ANSTO Prize for Innovative Use of Technology
- 2022 Fellow of the Royal Society of New South Wales

=== Books ===
Atom Probe Microscopy by Baptiste Gault, Michael P. Moody, Julie M. Cairney and Simon P. Ringer
