= Khosrow Bagheri =

Iranian philosopher of education

Khosrow Bagheri Noaparast
- In Persian: خسرو باقری نوع پرست
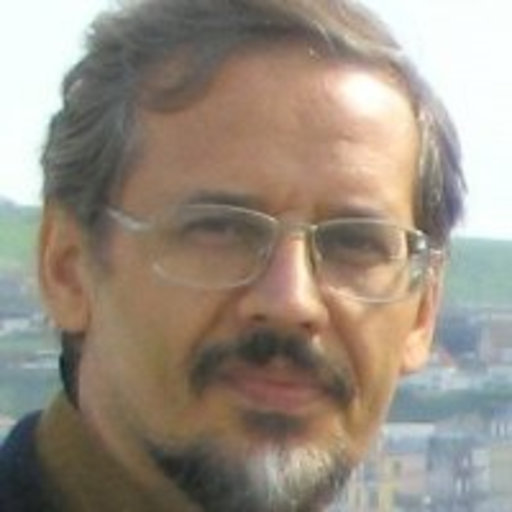
- Khosrow B N
- Born: 1957 (age 68–69); Tehran, Iran

Education
- Education: UNSW Sydney

Khosrow Bagheri Noaparast (in Persian: خسرو باقری نوع پرست) is an Iranian philosopher, educational theorist and the president of Philosophy of Education Society of Iran (PESI).

== Biography ==
Bagheri was born in 1957 in Tehran. He took his Ph.D. degree from the University of New South Wales, Australia, in 1994. He is Professor of Philosophy of Education at the University of Tehran. He has made contributions to a wide range of topics in philosophy of education, Religion and personal construct psychology; topics from different viewpoints, such as constructive realism, neo-Pragmatism, action theory, deconstruction, Hermeneutics, and Islamic philosophy of education. In 2011 he was awarded First order Medal of Research (The Distinguished Researcher) by the University of Tehran.

== Philosophical views ==
=== Religious education ===
In his book Islamic Education he places human agency as the main educational thesis of Islam. This is while before him scholars such as Mutahari believed in human nature as the center of Islamic education. He opposes nature as a central key to Islamic education claiming that human beings are not composed of non-living matter to be fabricated into a human being. Instead a human is a dynamic creature who should choose being religious. In this regard he has introduced abstinence by presence. While most scholars have insisted that religion is about preventing sinful situations Bagheri insists that real education leads to presence in a sinful situation and yet remain intact.

=== Personal construct theory ===
He argues that in George Kelly's personal construct psychology a combination of correspondence theory of truth and a coherence theory of truth is necessary. Offering criteria for a reconciliation of correspondence and coherence theories he argues that constructivism should be based on a reality and the effort is to search for an optimal point where reality and constructs reach each other.

=== Religious science ===
Most Classic Islamic Philosophers followed or concurred with Aristotle in understanding knowledge as grasping the form of a thing. This was possible in two ways, one by divine inspiration (which might be called intuition), or by sensory apprehension. They did not question, as many philosophers do today, whether sensory information was reliable. Either of these perspectives or a combination of them has led some to conclude that a science based on religion can lead to infallible knowledge. However, Bagheri argues that a religious science is only possible through interference of religious elements in the presupposition of a theory and hence will remain a science tout court, and its religious presuppositions will not guarantee infallible knowledge.

== Publications ==
A non-comprehensive list of Bagheri's published works include:

In English

- Bagheri Noaparast, Khosrow (1995). "Toward a more realistic constructivism". Advances in Personal Construct Psychology. 3. London: JAI Press Inc: 37–59.
- Bagheri Noaparast, Khosrow (2000). "Constructs and words". Constructivism in the Human Sciences. 5 (1). Denton, TX, USA: 65–70.
- Bagheri, Khosrow (2001). Islamic Education. UK: Alhoda. ISBN 978-964-472-328-5.
- Bagheri Noaparast, Khosrow (2005). "A hermeneutical model for research on the evaluation of academic achievement". Quarterly Journal of New Thoughts on Education. 1 (1 & 2). Iran: Al-Zahra University: 5–12.
- Bagheri Noaparast, Khosrow (2005). "Towards an Islamic psychology: An introduction to remove theoretical barriers". Psychological Studies. 1 (4). Iran: Al-Zahra University: 5–17.
- Bagheri Noaparast, Khosrow (2006). "Islamic concept of education reconsidered". American Journal of Islamic Social Science. 23 (4 (Fall)). Herndon, VA, USA: 88–103.
- Bagheri Noaparast, Khosrow; Khosravi, Zohre (2006). "Mind and mental health based on a realistic constructivism". Constructivism in the Human Sciences. 11 (1 & 2). Denton, TX, USA: 20–31.
- Bagheri Noaparast, Khosrow (2009). The Idea of a Religious Social Science. Tehran: Alhoda.
- Bagheri Noaparast, Khosrow; Khosravi, Zohre (2010). "A Dynamic Conception of Human Identity, Cultural Relation, and Cooperative Learning". Intercultural Education. 21 (3): 281–290. doi:10.1080/14675981003760465. S2CID 143505362.
- Bagheri Noaparast, Khosrow; Khosravi, Zohre (2011). "Deconstructive Religious education". Religious Education. 106 (1): 82–104. doi:10.1080/00344087.2011.539449. S2CID 144308349.
- Bagheri Noaparast, Khosrow (2012). "Al-Attas Revisited on the Islamic Understanding of Education". Journal of Shi'a Islamic Studies. 5 (2): 149–172. doi:10.1353/isl.2012.0010. S2CID 143700811.
- Bagheri Noaparast, Khosrow (2013). "Celebrating Moderate Dualism in the Philosophy of Education: A Reflection on the Hirst-Carr Debate". Journal of Philosophy of Education. 47 (4): 564–576. doi:10.1111/1467-9752.12039.
- Bagheri Noaparast, Khosrow (2013). "Physical and spiritual education within the framework of pure life". International Journal of Children's Spirituality. 18 (1): 46–61. doi:10.1080/1364436X.2012.741062. S2CID 214650011.

In Persian

- Bagheri, Khosrow (1990). Negahi dobare be tarbiate eslami نگاهی دوباره به تربیت اسلامی [Revisiting Islamic Education (Volume 1)] (in Persian). Tehran: Madrese Publications.
- Bagheri, Khosrow (1999). Mabani-e shivehayei tarbiate akhlaghi: Naghde tatbighie Elme Akhlagh va ravanshenasie moaser مبانی شیوه های تربیت اخلاقی:نقد تطبیقی علم اخلاق و روانشناسی معاصر [Foundations of Moral Education Methods] (in Persian). Tehran: Sazeman Tablighat Eslami Publications.
- Bagheri, Khosrow (2002). Chistie Tarbiate Dini: bahse o goftegoo ba Prof. Paul Hirst چیستی تربیت دینی: بحث و گفتگو با پروفسور پاول هرست [Discussions with Prof. Paul Hirst on religious education] (in Persian). Tehran: Tarbiate Eslami Publications.
- Bagheri, Khosrow (2004). Hoviate Elme Dini هویت علم دینی [The nature of religious science] (in Persian). Tehran: Vezarate Farhang Publications.
- Bagheri, Khosrow (2004). Mabanie falsafie Feminism مبانی فلسفی فمینیسم [Philosophical foundations of Feminism] (in Persian). Tehran: Vezarate Oloum Publications.
- Bagheri, Khosrow (2006). Negahi dobare be tarbiate eslami نگاهی دوباره به تربیت اسلامی، جلد دوم [Revisiting Islamic Education] (in Persian). Vol. 2. Tehran: Madrese Publications.
- Bagheri, Khosrow (2008). No-amalgarayei va falsafei talimo tarbiat نوعمل گرایی و فلسفه تعلیم و تربیت [Neo-Pragmatism and philosophy of Education] (in Persian). Tehran: Tehran University Publications.
- Bagheri, Khosrow; Khosravi, Zohreh (2009). Nazariyehayei ravanshenasie moaser: be soyei sazegarayei vaghegarayane نظریه های روانشناسی معاصر: به سوی سازه گرایی واقع گرایانه [Theories of contemporary psychology: Towards constructive realism] (in Persian). Tehran: Elm Publications.
- Bagheri, Khosrow (2009). Daramadi bar falsafei talim o tarbiate jomhoorie eslamie Iran, Vol.1 درآمدی بر فلسفه تعلیم و تربیت جمهوری اسلامی ایران، جلد اول [Islamic Republic of Iran’s philosophy of education, Vol. 1] (in Persian). Tehran: Elmi Farhangi Publications.
- Bagheri, Khosrow (2010). Daramadi bar falsafei talim o tarbiate jomhoorie eslamie Iran, Vol.2 درآمدی بر فلسفه تعلیم و تربیت جمهوری اسلامی ایران، جلد دوم [Islamic Republic of Iran’s philosophy of education, Vol. 2] (in Persian). Tehran: Elmi Farhangi Publications.
- Bagheri, Khosrow; Sajjadieh, Narges; Tayebe Tavasoli (2011). Rooykardha va Raveshhaye Pazhuhesh Dar Falsafei Ta'lim o Tarbiat رویکردها و روش های پژوهش در فلسفه تعلیم و تربیت [RApproaches and research methods in philosophy of education] (in Persian). Tehran: Pazhuheshkadei motaleate farhangi va ejtemaee.
- Bagheri, Khosrow (2011). Olgooye Matloobe Amoozesho Parvaresh Dar Jomhoorie Eslamie Iran الگوی مطلوب آموزش و پرورش در جمهوری اسلامی ایران [A Model for Education in The Islamic Republic of Iran] (in Persian). Tehran: Madrese Publications.
- Bagheri, Khosrow (2012). Goftegoohaie da babe ilme dini گفت و گوهایی در باب علم دینی [Debates on Religious Science] (in Persian). Tehran: Pajuheshgahe Ulume Insani Publications.
- Bagheri, Khosrow (2012). Nazarie: ilme tajrobie dini علم تجربی دینی [A Theory: Empirical Religious Science] (in Persian). Tehran: Korsihaye Nazariyepardazi.
- Bagheri, Khosrow (2012). Noavari: Talim va tarbiat Islami تعلیم و تربیت اسلامی [An Innovation: Islamic Education] (in Persian). Tehran: Korsihaye Nazariyepardazi.
- Bagheri, Khosrow (2013). GofteGoyei Moalem va Filsoof گفت و گوی معلم و فیلسوف [Dialogue between Teacher and Philosopher] (in Persian). Tehran: Elmi Farhangi Publications.

== Translations ==
Bagheri has translated the following books into Persian:

- Laing, R. D. (2010). The divided self: An existential study in sanity and madness. UK: Penguin.
- Scheffler, Israel (1985). Of Human Potential. An Essay in the Philosophy of Education. Routledge & Kegan Paul Inc. ISBN 9780710205711.
- Adams, P. L., Milner, J. R., & Schrepf, N. A. (1984). Fatherless children.
