= St George Hospital (Sydney) =

Hospital in Sydney, New South Wales, Australia

- South East Sydney Local Health District

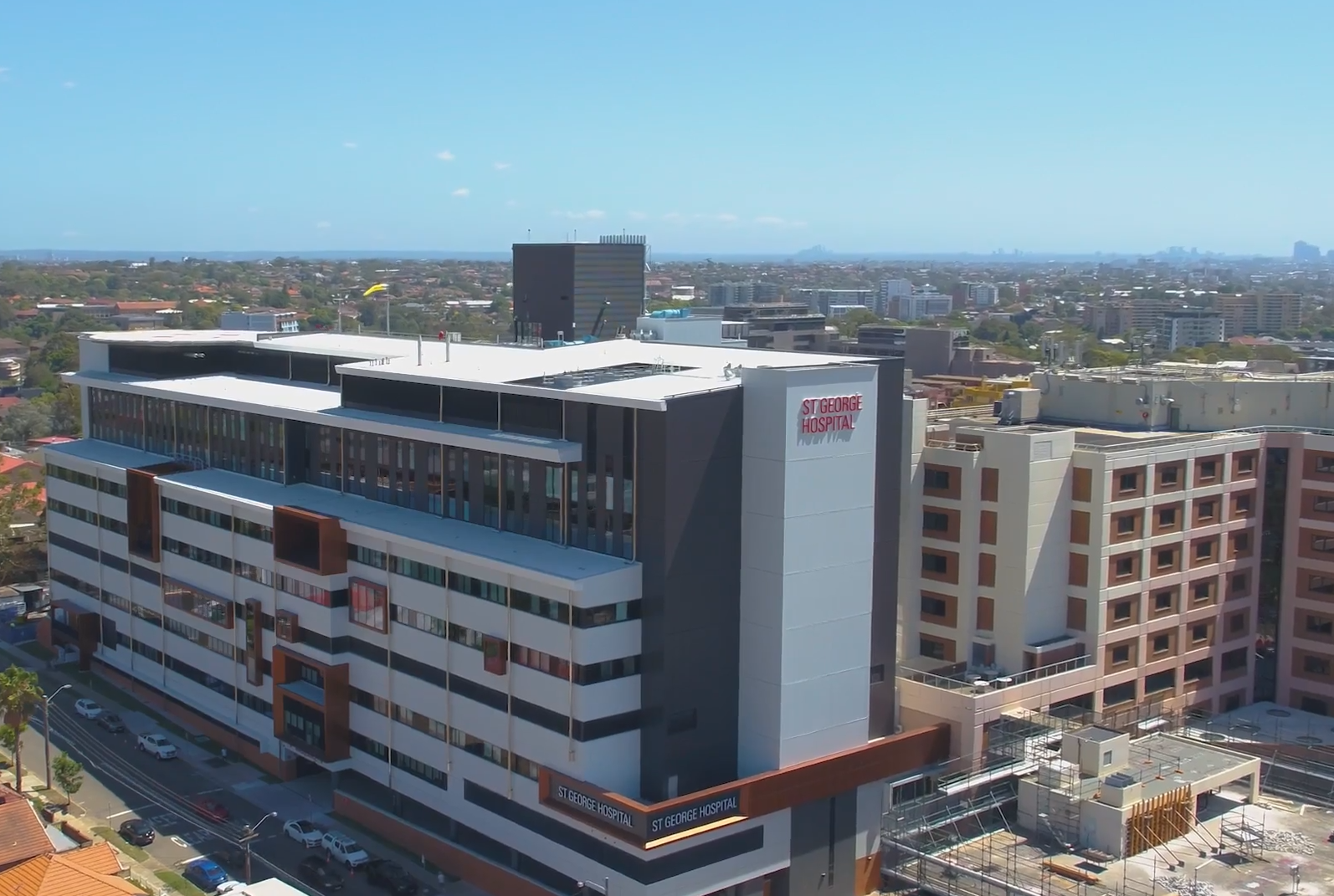

Geography
- Location: Kogarah, Sydney, New South Wales, Australia
- Coordinates: 33.9672°S 151.1339°E

Organisation
- Care system: Public Medicare (AU)
- Type: District General, Teaching
- Affiliated university: University of New South Wales

Services
- Emergency department: Yes
- Beds: approx 547

Helipads
- Helipad: (ICAO: YXSG)
Number	Length		Surface
Number	ft	m	Surface
1			concrete

History
- Founded: 1894

Links
- Website: St George Hospital
- Lists: Hospitals in Australia

The St George Hospital and Community Health Service is a tertiary referral hospital, originally a district general hospital, located in Kogarah, a southern suburb of Sydney, New South Wales, Australia. It is part of the South East Sydney Local Health District and is an accredited principal teaching hospital of the University of New South Wales.

== Overview ==
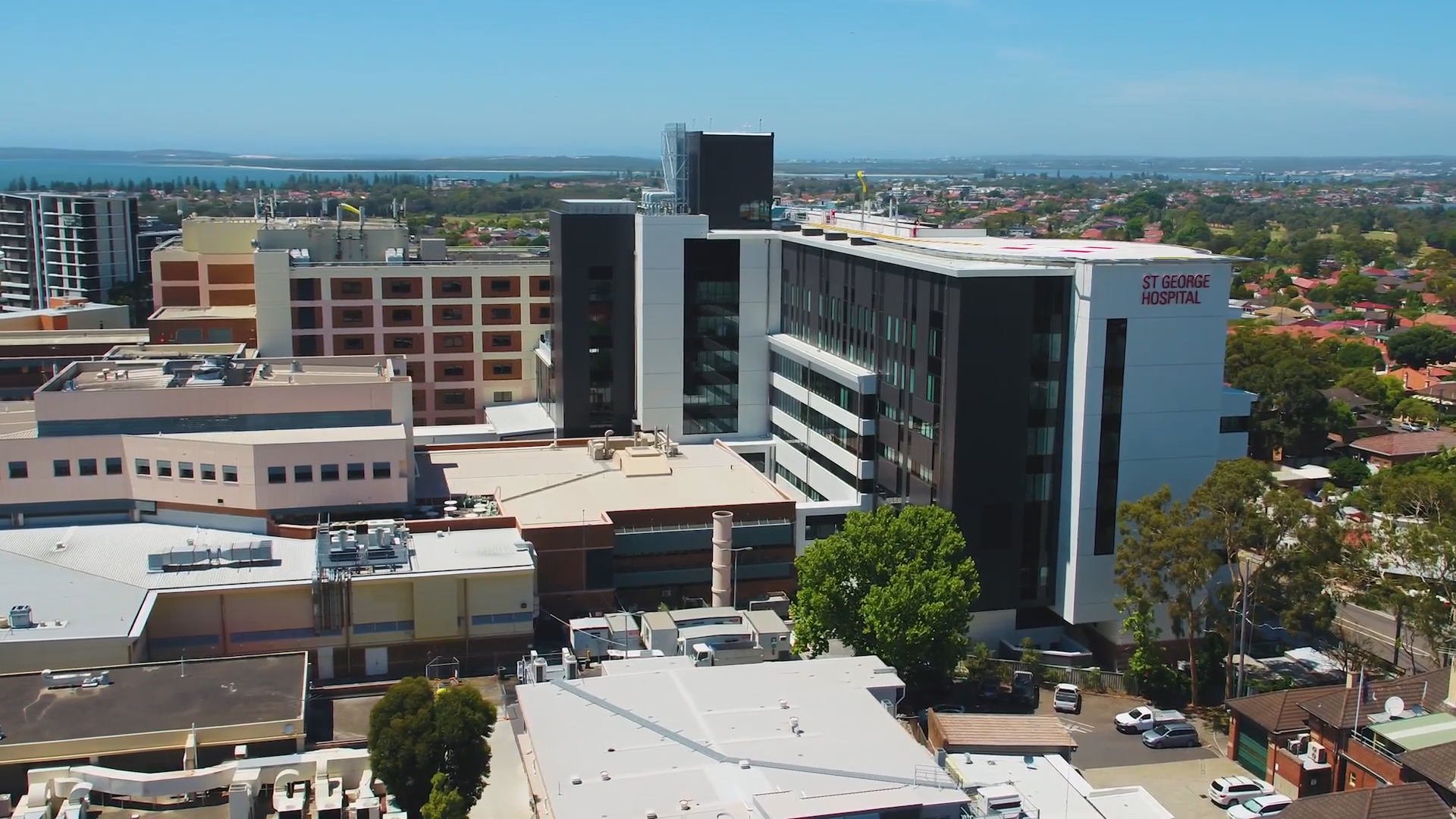
An aerial view of the hospital complex

As a major tertiary and teaching hospital, St George accepts patients from other parts of Sydney, NSW and beyond. It primarily serves about 250,000 residents of southern Sydney, in the St George area bounded by Botany Bay, Cooks River in the north, Georges River in the south and Salt Pan Creek in the west. Approximately 35% of the St George area's residents are from a non-English speaking background. The hospital is also the nearest provider of specialist medical services for around 200,000 residents of the Sutherland Shire.

The hospital has a designated medical trauma service and is the Medical Retrieval Service Coordination Centre for NSW. The hospital's departments include anaesthesia, critical care, surgery, cancer care, medicine, women's and children's health, mental health, community health and medical imaging.

In the 2002 – 2003 financial year, there were more than 45,000 admissions (including day-only), and more than 723,000 outpatient treatments were administered. The hospital has approximately 600 beds and more than 2,500 staff (full-time equivalents) and is one of the largest in Sydney.

== History ==
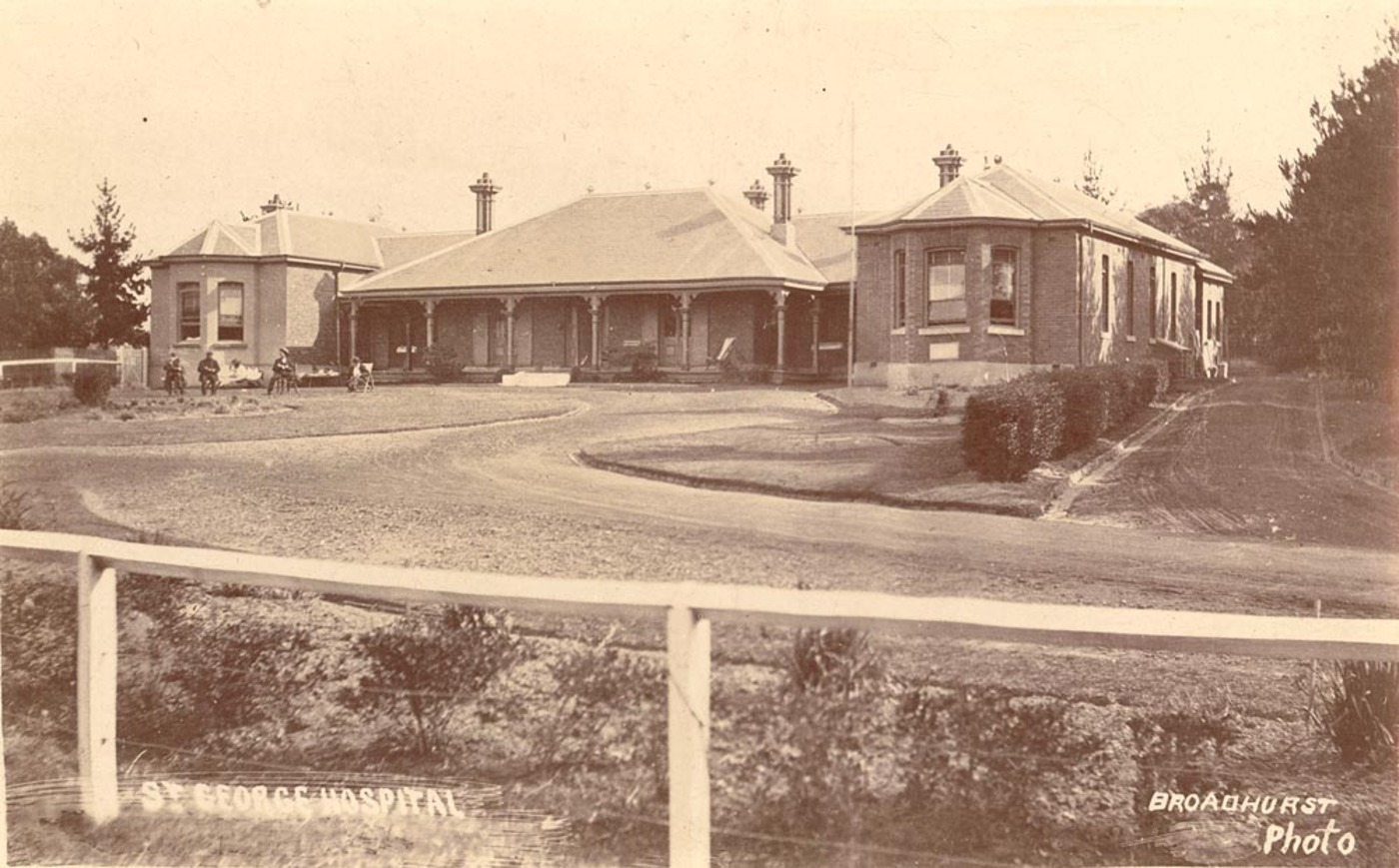
The original cottage

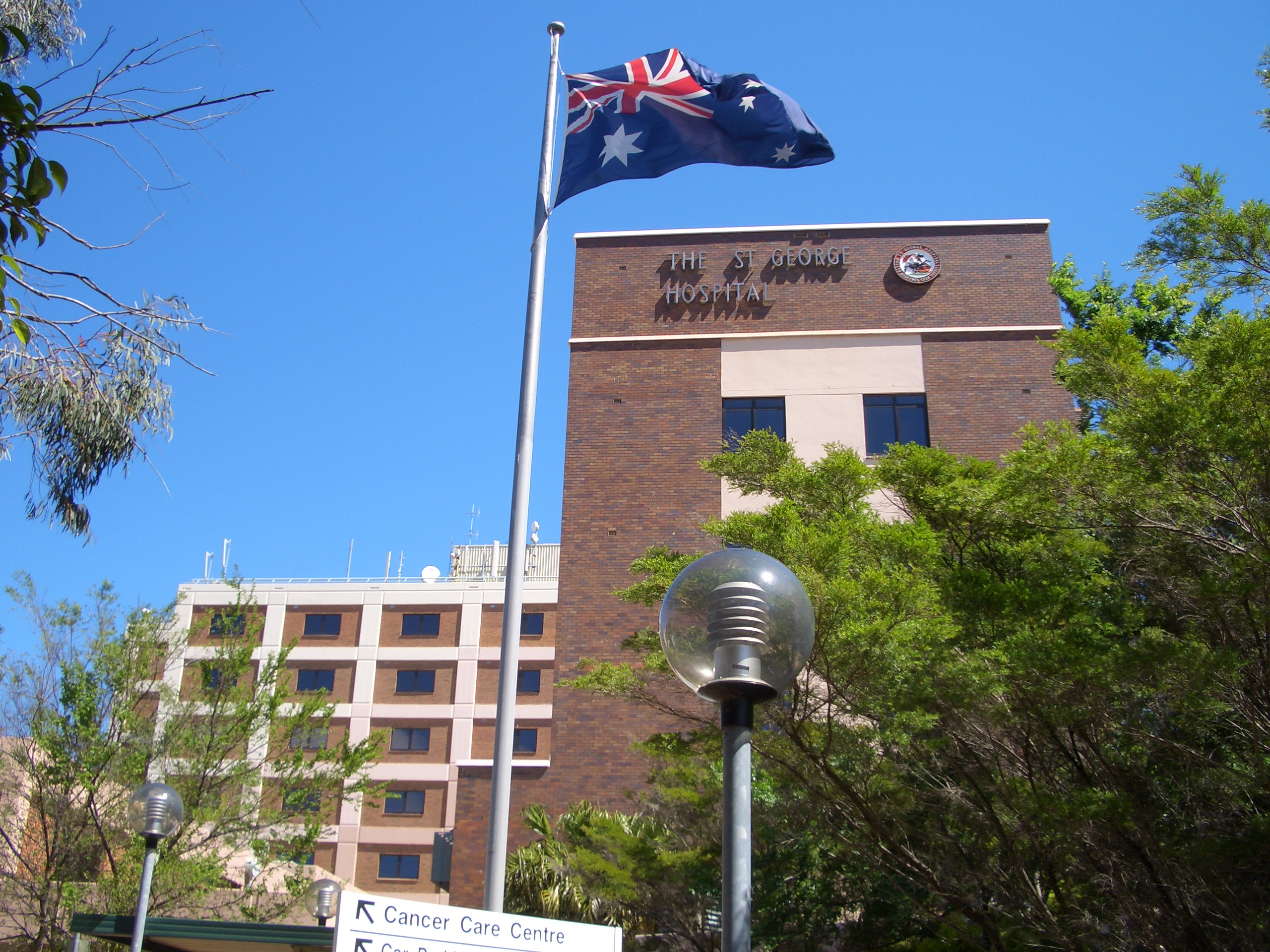
The ward block built in the early 1970s

On 25 July 1891, a public meeting was convened in Rockdale by Alderman D. B. Carruthers, the mayor of Rockdale, to deliberate the establishment of a cottage hospital in St George, Sydney. Hon J. H. Carruthers, Minister for Lands, outlined the necessity for the hospital and discussed fundraising efforts, including a day of racing at Moorefield Racecourse. A committee was formed, comprising members from Rockdale, Kogarah, and Hurstville, with a women's committee also established. The meeting addressed various aspects of the hospital's planning, including site selection. Another meeting took place on 8 August 1891 in Hurstville, focusing on concerns related to necessity and taxation. In response, Hon. J. H. Carruthers presented a funding plan based on charitable efforts, highlighting the statistics of patients from the area admitted to other hospitals and emphasising the potential benefits of a local facility. The meeting concluded that a cottage hospital should be established in St George. Subsequently, committees initiated their project efforts, and the site selection process was entrusted to representatives from the municipalities and medical professionals, with Dr Manning acting as an arbitrator. Each committee contributed £50 towards the funding of the project.

St George Hospital began operation in November 1894, as a cottage hospital. It became a district hospital in 1924 and began performing surgery.

By 1934, St George Hospital was equivalent to any other district hospital in metropolitan Sydney.

In 1964, St George Hospital became a teaching hospital with specialised departments and became known as The St George Hospital. In the late 1980s, it underwent a A$200 million redevelopment into a tertiary teaching hospital, providing the people of southern Sydney with specialist healthcare services closer to home. In 1998, there was an unsuccessful attempt by the NSW Government to transfer St Vincent's Hospital, Sydney from its site in Darlinghurst to the St George Hospital site. The plan was abandoned due to community opposition to the loss of the St George name, and uncertainties about the future of the obstetrics and gynaecology service under the St Vincent's Catholic Church-run administration. In 2014, the hospital celebrated its 120th birthday.

In 2017, St George Hospital underwent a A$277 million redevelopment, with Multiplex constructing the 9-level Acute Services Building, the first of its scale in New South Wales to be constructed directly above an operational 24-hour Emergency Department. The building includes a 52-bed intensive care and high-dependency unit (with 38 funded beds), a cardiac catheterisation unit, 128 inpatient beds, a sterilising services department (SSD), an atrium linking to the ED, the original ward block (called Tower Ward Block) and the Clinical Service Building, and 8 additional digital and interventional operating theatres.

== St George Hospital School ==
The Department of Education and Training operates a school within the hospital, known as St George Hospital School. The school is operated as part of the Botany Bay Network of schools within the Sydney Region.

In terms of facilities, the school uses a single classroom to deliver teaching, but less formal teaching does occur elsewhere according to the needs of the students.

St George Hospital School provides for the educational needs of school-age children and teenagers while they are short term or long term patients at the hospital. In 2009, there were 703 students enrolled in the school at various times during the year, with the majority of those students staying for less than 3 days. All grades are provided for, from Kindergarten to Year 12, according to the syllabi produced by the Board of Studies. Students undertake exams, just as they would at their home schools, including the NAPLAN testing, School Certificate and Higher School Certificate. The school works closely with the Child and Adolescent Mental Health Service at the hospital in supporting the transition of students to the school and to the hospital.

== See also ==
- List of hospitals
- List of hospitals in Australia
