= Clauss =

Clauss is a surname. Notable people with the surname include:

- Al Clauss, Major League Baseball player in 1915
- Alfred Clauss (1906–1998), German-born architect
- Carin Clauss (born January 24, 1939), American lawyer and legal scholar
- Jane West Clauss (1907–2003), American architect and educator
- Jared Clauss, American Football player
- Pamela Clauss, Australian nurse
- Paul Clauss (1868–1945), Scotland and British Isles rugby union player
- Roy Clauss, surgeon

== See also ==
- Clauss Cutlery Company, scissors and shears manufacturer
- Achaia Clauss, Greek winery
- Claus
