= Dalgarno =

Dalgarno is a surname. Notable people with the surname include:

- Alexander Dalgarno (1928–2015), British physicist and astronomer
- Anne Dalgarno (1909–1980), Australian politician
- Brad Dalgarno (born 1967), Canadian ice hockey player
- George Dalgarno (1616–1687), Scottish linguist
- Joel Dalgarno (born 1987), Canadian lacrosse player
- Lynn Dalgarno (born 1935), Australian geneticist
- Roy Dalgarno (1910–2001), Australian artist

== See also ==
- 6941 Dalgarno, main-belt asteroid
- Shine-Dalgarno sequence, named for co-discoverer Lynn Dalgarno
- Dalgarno v Hannah, court case
- Dalgarno (ward), electoral ward in London, England
