= Claus =

Claus (sometimes Clas) is both a given name and a German, Danish, and Dutch surname. Notable people with the name include:

== Given name ==
- Claus von Amsberg, Prince Claus of the Netherlands, Jonkheer van Amsberg (1926–2002)
- Claus-Casimir of Orange-Nassau, Count of Orange-Nassau, Jonkheer van Amsberg (born 2004)
- Claus von Bülow (1926–2019), British socialite accused of attempting to murder his wife, Sunny von Bülow
- Claus Clausen (disambiguation), several people of that name
- Claus Jacob (born 1969), German scientist
- Claus Jørgensen (racewalker) (born 1974), Danish racewalker
- Claus Bech Jørgensen (born 1976), Danish-born Faroese footballer
- Claus Larsen (disambiguation), several people of that name
- Claus Lundekvam (born 1973), Norwegian former footballer
- Claus Moser, Baron Moser (1922–2015), British statistician
- Claus Nielsen (born 1964), Danish football striker
- Claus Norreen (born 1970), Danish musician with the band Aqua, and record producer
- Claus Offe (1940–2025), German political sociologist
- Claus Ogerman (1930–2016), German arranger, orchestrator, conductor and composer
- Claus Peymann (1937–2025), German theatre director and manager
- Claus Roxin (1931–2025), German jurist
- Claus Schilling (1871–1946), German experimenter in Nazi human concentration camp experiments executed for war crimes
- Claus Sievert (1949–2009), German-born American printmaker and illustrator
- Claus Sluter (1340s–1405 or 1406), Dutch sculptor
- Claus Spreckels (1828–1908), major industrialist in Hawai'i and California
- Claus Schenk Graf von Stauffenberg (1907–1944), a German officer who, along with others, attempted to assassinate Hitler in 1944
- Claus Thomsen (born 1970), Danish footballer
- Claus Toksvig (1929–1988), Danish journalist, broadcaster and politician

== Surname ==
- Carl Friedrich Claus (1827–1900), German chemist
- Carl Friedrich Wilhelm Claus (1835–1899), German zoologist
- Daniel Claus (1727–1787), British commissioner of Indian affairs and a Loyalist during the American Revolution
- Emile Claus (1849–1924), Belgian painter, inventor of the Luminism style of Impressionistic painting
- Hildrun Claus (born 1939), German former athlete
- Hugo Claus (1929–2008), Flemish novelist, poet, playwright, painter and film director
- Ines Claus (born 1977), German politician (CDU)
- Joshua Claus, American war criminal
- Jürgen Claus (1935–2023), German artist and author
- Karl Ernst Claus or Carl Ernst Claus (1796–1864), Livonian chemist and naturalist, discoverer of the element ruthenium
- Roland Claus (born 1954), German politician
- Santa Claus (politician) (born 1947), American politician from Alaska

== Fictional characters ==
- Santa Claus
- Mrs. Claus, Santa's wife
- Claus, a character and the protagonist's twin brother in the 2006 Nintendo game Mother 3
- Claus, in the advertising campaign for Palm Centro
- Alicia Claus, the protagonist of the 2006 video game Bullet Witch

== Organisations ==
- FC Santa Claus, a Finnish association football club

== See also ==
- Claus process, the major process for removing elemental S from H_{2}S gas
- Klaus (disambiguation)
- Clauss
