= C8orf58 =

Protein-coding gene in the species Homo sapiens

Identifiers
- Aliases: C8orf58, chromosome 8 open reading frame 58
- External IDs: MGI: 2145726; HomoloGene: 19540; GeneCards: C8orf58; OMA:C8orf58 - orthologs

Gene location (Human)
Chr.	Chromosome 8 (human)
Band	8p21.3	Start	22,599,599 bp
Band	8p21.3	End	22,604,150 bp

Gene location (Mouse)
Chr.	Chromosome 14 (mouse)
Band	14|14 D2	Start	70,391,854 bp
Band	14|14 D2	End	70,396,951 bp
RNA expression pattern
Bgee	Human / Mouse (ortholog); Top expressed in: testicle; spleen; gonad; right hemisphere of cerebellum; apex of heart; sural nerve; right coronary artery; tibialis anterior muscle; skin of limb; skin of leg / Top expressed in: left lung lobe; esophagus; endocardial cushion; renal corpuscle; skin of external ear; facial motor nucleus; medullary collecting duct; lip; granulocyte; right lung lobe; More reference expression data
BioGPS	n/a
Orthologs
Species	Human	Mouse
Entrez	541565	268759
Ensembl	ENSG00000241852	ENSMUSG00000044551
UniProt	Q8NAV2	Q66JV7
RefSeq (mRNA)	NM_173686; NM_001013842; NM_001198827	NM_001004155; NM_001112735
RefSeq (protein)	NP_001013864; NP_001185756; NP_775957	NP_001004155; NP_001106206
Location (UCSC)	Chr 8: 22.6 – 22.6 Mb	Chr 14: 70.39 – 70.4 Mb
PubMed search
- Wikidata
View/Edit Human	View/Edit Mouse

Chromosome 8 open reading frame 58 is an uncharacterised protein that in humans is encoded by the C8orf58 gene. The protein is predicted to be localized in the nucleus.

== Gene ==
The C8orf58 gene is located on chromosome 8 at position 8p21.3. It spans a total of 4,550 base pairs and has seven exons. C8orf58 is flanked by the genes PDLIM2 and CCAR2. There are no aliases. It is defined as a protein coding gene.

== mRNA ==
C8orf58 produces three transcript splice variants. The transcript of variant 1 represents the longest transcript and encodes the largest protein. It is 2,062 base pairs and contains seven exons. There are two other splice variants, produced by alternative splice sites.

Isoform	Exons	Length (base pairs)	Features
Transcript Variant 1	1, 2, 3, 4, 5, 6, 7	2062	One upstream in-frame stop codon.
Transcript Variant 2	1, 2, 3, 4, 5, 6, 7	2038	Alternate in-frame splice site in the 3' coding region.
Transcript Variant 3	1, 2, 3, 4, 5, 6	1955	Lacks an alternate exon, results in a frameshift in the 3' coding region.

C8orf58 has a relatively short 5’ region and a moderate 3’ region. Both the 5’ and 3’ regions contain stem loops. There is one predicted miRNA binding site that found in the 3’UTR of C8orf58.

== Protein ==
C8orf58 protein Isoform 1 is 365 amino acids long. Isoform 2 and Isoform 3 are 357 and 300 amino acids respectively. There is a kozak consensus sequence present, which confirms it is a protein coding sequence.

C8orf58 Isoform 1 has a molecular weight of 39.7 kDa and an isoelectric point of 8.29. It is proline and arginine rich and isoleucine, asparagine, phenylalanine, and tyrosine poor.

The predicted secondary structure of the C8orf58 protein include multiple alpha helices and one beta strands.

Isoform	From mRNA Variant	Length (amino acids)	Molecular Weight (kDa)	Isoelectric Point
1	1	365	39.7	8.30
2	2	357	38.6	8.30
3	3	300	32.0	5.82

== Evolutionary history ==
It is part of the DUF4657 family, a family of proteins found in eukaryotes. Proteins in this family are typically between 305 and 370 amino acids in length. The Domain of Unknown Function (DUF) of C8orf58 is located between amino acids 73 to 364.

== Expression ==
According to the NCBI GEO profiles, C8orf58 is a narrowly expressed protein found in spleen, lung, thymus, prostate, and spinal cord tissue. It is constitutively expressed in these tissues.

== Post-translational modification ==
The bioinformatic tools on Expasy were used to determine potential post translational modification sites for the C8orf58 protein. There are two predicted phosphorylation sites and one predicted sumoylation site.

== Subcellular localization ==
According to PSORT II, C8orf58 is located in the nucleus. This is supported by the presence of a sumoylation site, which is involved in nucleic cytoplasmic transport.

== Interacting proteins ==
Two proteins have been found to interact with protein C8orf58, CENPH and metG1, which were found using two hybrid assay and the two hybrid pooling approach respectively. CENPH (Centromere Protein H) plays a critical role in centromere structure, kinetochore formation, and sister chromatid separation. MetG1 (Methionine—tRNA ligase) is required for elongation of protein synthesis and the initiation of all mRNA translation through initiator tRNA(fMet) aminoacylation.

== Homology ==
An important paralog of this gene is ENSG00000248235. Orthologs of the human gene C8orf58 are limited to vertebrates of the animal kingdom.

Scientific name	Common name	NCBI Accession Number	Length (Amino Acids)	Date of Divergence (MYA)	Identity (%)	Similarity (%)
Homo sapiens	Human	NP_001013864.1	365	-	-	-
Gorilla gorilla	Gorilla	XP_004046807.1	439	9.06	96	79.50
Marmota marmota	Alpine Marmot	XP_015354979.1	369	90	68	75.7
Oryctolagus cuniculus	European Rabbit	XP_008248092.1	371	90	66	72
Nannospalax galili	Spalax	XP_008848689.1	362	90	65	74.7
Ceratotherium simum simum	White Rhinoceros	XP_014652157.1	381	96	66	72.7
Odobenus rosmarus divergens	Pacific walrus	XP_012418498.1	388	96	65	74.7
Sus scrofa	Wild Boar	XP_005670472.1	382	96	65	73.3
Hipposideros armiger	Great Roundleaf Bat	XP_019487131.1	387	96	62	71
Eptesicus fuscus	Big Brown Bat	XP_008149784.1	377	96	62	70.1
Loxodonta africana	African Bush Elephant	XP_003412428.1	372	105	71	77.2
Orycteropus afer afer	Aardvark	XP_007949039.1	370	105	65	71.7
Parus major	Great Tit	XP_015504136.1	320	312	32	35.6
Anolis carolinensis	Carolina Anole	XP_008118367.1	453	312	28	38.9
