= Leslie Lazarus =

Australian endocrinologist

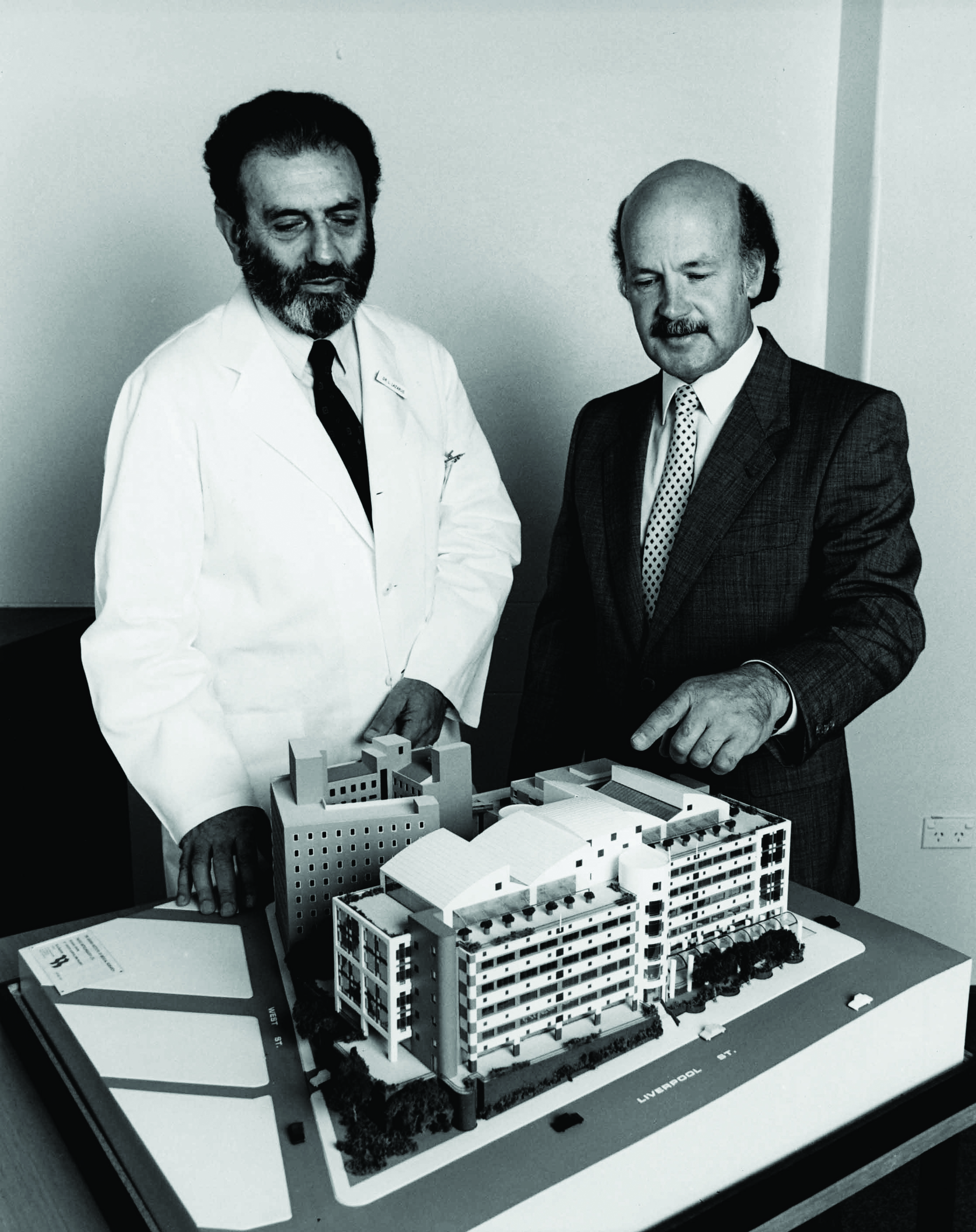
Leslie Lazarus (left) and professor John Shine looking at a model of the Garvan Institute building (back right) and then-proposed adjoining facilities.

Leslie "Les" Lazarus AO (11 December 1929 - 17 December 2022) was an Australian endocrinologist who was one of the first two Directors of the Garvan Institute of Medical Research, Sydney from 1966 to 1969 and sole Director from 1969 to 1990. At the Garvan Institute he led a joint laboratory and clinical research team studying diabetes and pituitary hormone secretions, in particular the secretion and clinical uses of human growth hormone.

From 1974 until 1988 Lazarus was an associate professor of medicine at the University of New South Wales and from 1988 until 1995 he was a professor of medicine at the University of New South Wales. In 1995 he was appointed an emeritus consultant to St Vincent's Hospital, Sydney.

== Early years and education ==
Leslie Lazarus was born in Sydney and educated at Sydney Boys High School and the University of Sydney, which he entered on a scholarship (Public Exhibitioner) in 1947. He graduated in Medicine in 1953 and after clinical training at St Vincent's Hospital, Sydney was admitted to the Royal Australasian College of Physicians (MRACP) in 1958 and as a Fellow in 1968. In 1969, he was admitted as a Fellow of the Australasian Association of Clinical Biochemists (FAACB) and in 1977, he was admitted as a Fellow of the Royal College of Pathologists of Australasia (FRCPA).

In 1959–61, Lazarus was a research fellow at the Institute for Clinical Research at the Middlesex Hospital Medical School, London where he was mentored by the Endocrinologist, Sir John Nabarro. In 1962, Lazarus was appointed Staff Clinical Endocrinologist to St Vincent's Hospital, Sydney and established its first endocrine laboratory. In 1963, the endocrine laboratory was transferred to the newly opened Garvan Institute of Medical Research. In 1967, he was appointed consultant endocrinologist to the Royal Alexandra Hospital for Children, Sydney.

== Career ==
In 1958, Lazarus was one of the founders of the Endocrine Society of Australia and in 1982, he was made a Life Member of the Endocrine Society of Australia. In 1988, he was appointed an Officer in the Order of Australia (AO) "For service to medicine, particularly in the field of medical research". In 1993, he was the Roman Travelling Lecturer of the Australasian Association of Clinical Biochemists. In this role he visited all of the Australian and New Zealand capital cities to give the Roman Lecture for 1993, on "The Clinical Biochemist as Information Scientist".

In 1990, Lazarus retired from the position of executive director of the Garvan Institute to become director of the Department of Biochemistry at St Vincent's Hospital and then in 1991, the executive director of the Institute of Laboratory Medicine. In 1998, he was one of the founders, together with Paul Justin Compton, of Pacific Knowledge Systems an information technology company utilising Paul Compton's concept of Ripple Down Rules to provide automated interpretative reports for pathology laboratories worldwide.

== Development of the Garvan Institute ==
Under the direction of Leslie Lazarus the research activity of the Garvan Institute grew from a small endocrine laboratory of St Vincent’s Hospital in 1963 to a major institute of national importance that was incorporated by an Act of the New South Wales Government in 1984[1] . In 1982, the National Health and Medical Research Council (NHMRC) awarded the Garvan Institute its first Program Grant for research into diabetes. In 1986, the Garvan Institute became one of only five ‘centres of research excellence’ in Australia to receive NHMRC ‘block funding’.

== Achievements ==
During the first decades of the Garvan the key achievements were: the use of a cryogenic probe for the treatment of pituitary tumours, the use of insulin infusions for the treatment of severe diabetes, demonstration of the role of growth hormone in foetal brain growth, a study of the growth and fitness of Australian children, the development of an artificial pancreas for the treatment of diabetes, the role of growth hormone in breast cancer, the production and use of biosynthetic human growth hormone and the development of a computer expert system for the interpretation of laboratory results.
