= FAM222A =

Protein-coding gene in humans

Identifiers
- Aliases: FAM222A, C12orf34, family with sequence similarity 222 member A
- External IDs: MGI: 3605543; GeneCards: FAM222A

Gene location (Human)
| Chr. | Chromosome 12 (human) |
| Band | 12q24.11 | Start | 109,713,825 bp |
| Band | 12q24.11 | End | 109,770,495 bp |

Gene location (Mouse)
| Chr. | Chromosome 5 (mouse) |
| Band | 5|5 F | Start | 114,706,077 bp |
| Band | 5|5 F | End | 114,751,281 bp |
RNA expression pattern
| Bgee | Human / Mouse (ortholog); Top expressed in: C1 segment; inferior ganglion of vagus nerve; substantia nigra; left testis; right testis; putamen; gonad; pituitary gland; anterior pituitary; internal globus pallidus / Top expressed in: adrenal gland; secondary oocyte; zygote; primary oocyte; striatum of neuraxis; neural layer of retina; tail of embryo; lens; cerebellum; cerebellar cortex; More reference expression data |
| BioGPS | n/a |
Orthologs
| Databases | NCBI: entry; OMA: entry |
| Species | Human | Mouse |
| Entrez | 84915 | 433940 |
| Ensembl | ENSG00000139438 | ENSMUSG00000041930 |
| UniProt | Q5U5X8 | Q6PGH4 |
| RefSeq (mRNA) | NM_032829 | NM_001004180 |
| RefSeq (protein) | NP_116218 | NP_001004180 |
| Location (UCSC) | Chr 12: 109.71 – 109.77 Mb | Chr 5: 114.71 – 114.75 Mb |
| PubMed search |
- Wikidata
| View/Edit Human | View/Edit Mouse |

Family with sequence similarity 222 member A is a protein of unknown function. In humans it is encoded by the gene FAM222A. Aggregatin's cellular function is not well understood, however it has been implicated in Alzheimer's disease.

== Gene ==
FAM222A is also called C12orf34. It is located on chromosome 12 at q24.11. It encompasses 56,672 bp. The mRNA is 3,685 bp while the coding region is 1,359 bp.

FAM222A is highly expressed in the brain and spinal cord. It is expressed to a lesser extent in the cerebellum, pituitary gland, adrenal gland and testis.

== mRNA ==
It has 3 different splice variants of mRNA. The most common mRNA is 3,685 bp while the coding region is 1,359 bp. The mRNA consists of three exons and has two different isoforms in humans. The Kozak Sequence is not very well conserved in FAM222A and it has a non-canonical polyadenylation site.

== Protein ==
FAM222A is a protein made of 452 amino acids. It contains a domain of unknown function called pfam15258 which is 200 amino acids long.

It has been found to be part of protein plaques formed in the brains of patients with Alzheimer's disease.

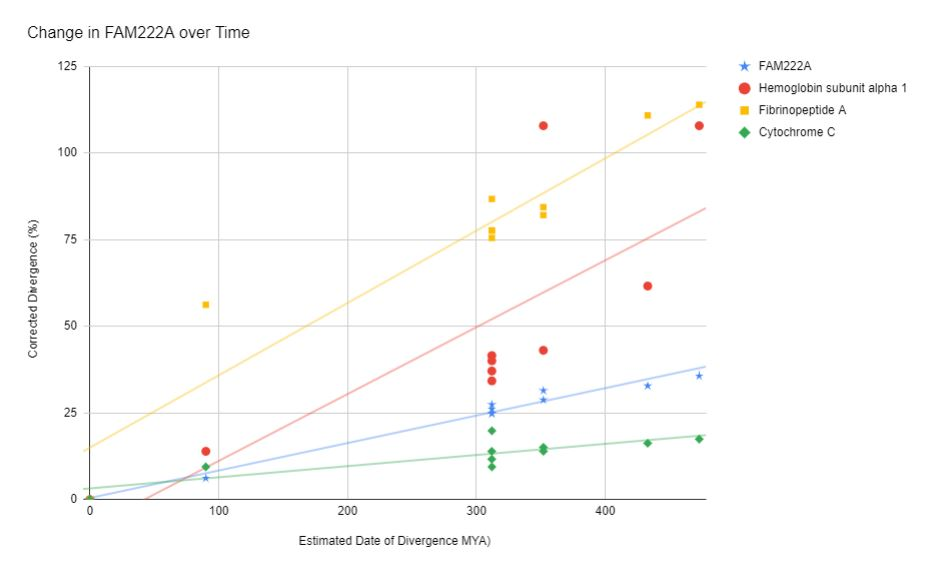
This graph shows the changes in amino acid sequence that FAM222A has as a function of how related the organism is to humans. It is compared to other common genes.

FAM222A has an unusually high amount of prolines with a 6 segment run from amino acids 392 to 397.

Structurally, FAM222A has 5 domains which are connected by linker regions.

Analysis of the amino acid sequence suggests that FAM222A is localized in the nucleus.

== Expression and regulation ==
FAM222A is highly expressed in the brain and to a lesser extent in the adrenal glands.

Alzheimer’s disease seems to cause an increase in FAM222A in the brain, but other degenerative diseases such as Parkinson’s do not.

== Interacting proteins ==
FAM222A has been found to interact with mainly transcription factors. These include mainly pre-B-cell leukemia transcription factors and Homeobox Meis proteins.

== Homologs ==
FAM222A has only one paralog in humans, FAM222B which is also not well characterized. These two proteins only share about 20% identity.

It has many orthologs in other organisms but is restricted to jawed vertebrates, as far back as bony and cartilaginous fish. Overall the protein is well conserved with a lowest identity of around 50% but certain regions are very strictly conserved such as the beginning of pfam15258 as well as the last 60-70 amino acids on the C terminus.

The protein appears to be changing very slowly even in distantly related animals. It is changing at a rate just slightly higher than Cytochrome C, a highly conserved protein.
