= Sue Clark =

Sue Clark may refer to:

- Sue Cassidy Clark, American music journalist and photographer
- Sue Brannon Clark, environmental radiochemist

== See also ==
- Susan Clark (disambiguation)
