= Susan J. Clark =

Australian biomedical researcher

Professor Susan J. Clark FAA FAHMS
- Education: Honours: Australian National University, 1978 PhD: University of Adelaide, 1982
- Occupation: Scientist
- Title: Professor
- Website: https://www.garvan.org.au/people/researchers/susan-clark

Susan J. Clark is an Australian biomedical researcher in epigenetics of development and cancer. She was elected a Fellow of the Australian Academy of Science in 2015, and is a National Health and Medical Research Council (NHMRC) Senior Principal Research Fellow and Research Director and Head of Genomics and Epigenetics Division at the Garvan Institute of Medical Research. Clark developed the first method for bisulphite sequencing for DNA methylation analysis and used it to establish that the methylation machinery of mammalian cells is capable of both maintenance and de novo methylation at CpNpG sites and showed is inheritable. Clark's research has advanced understanding of the role of DNA methylation, non-coding RNA and microRNA in embryogenesis, reprogramming, stem cell development and cancer, and has led to the identification of epigenomic biomarkers in cancer. Clark is a founding member of the International Human Epigenome Consortium (IHEC) and President of the Australian Epigenetics Alliance (AEpiA).

== Education and research ==
Clark completed her Bachelor of Science (Honours Class 1) degree at the Australian National University in 1978, under the supervision of Dr Ken Reed and Dr Lynn Dalgarno (who along with Dr John Shine uncovered the Shine-Dalgarno sequence). She earned a PhD (1982) in Biochemistry at the University of Adelaide, by mapping and sequencing human histone genes, under the supervision of Dr Julian Wells. During her postdoctoral years (1983-1988) at Biotechnology Australia, Clark led studies on the first recombinant vaccine development in Australia and eukaryotic gene expression of human inhibin, IL-3 and GM-CSF.

As Group Leader of the Gene Regulation Unit at the Kanematsu Laboratories, Royal Prince Alfred Hospital from 1992 - 2000, Clark developed highly sensitive techniques that enabled DNA methylation sequencing of single genes from small volumes (<100 cells) using sodium bisulphite, which converts cytosine residues to uracil residues in single-stranded DNA, under conditions that preserve 5-Methylcytosine.

In 2000, Clark established the Epigenetics Group at the Sydney Cancer Centre, Royal Prince Alfred Hospital and led the unit until 2004. She went on to establish the Epigenetics Research Program in the Cancer Research Division and the moved Garvan Institute of Medical Research and was appointed the inaugural Head of the Genomics and Epigenetics Division in 2015. Clark has published over 650 manuscripts which contributed to the emergence of an entirely new discipline of cancer epigenomics.

== Recognition and awards ==
- 2020 – Fellow of the Australian Academy of Health and Medical Sciences
- 2019 – NSW Premier's Prize for "Excellence in Medical Biological Sciences (Cell and molecular, medical, veterinary and genetics)"
- 2017 – Clive and Vera Ramaciotti Foundation: 2017 Medal of Excellence ($50K)
- 2015 – The Rob Sutherland Make a Difference ($20K), Cancer Institute NSW
- 2015 – Nadine Watson Lecture Award for a Leading Female Scientist
- 2012 – Rotary Award for Vocational Excellence
- 2011 – Victor Chang Medal (Barbara Ell Seminar Series Lecturer)
- 2010 – Service to Science and Industry, North Shore Times, 50 year medal
- 2009 – Australia's "Top Ten" (NHMRC) Scientist Award for 2009
- 2008 – Director's Inaugural Women in Science Lecture Award (WEHI)
- 2006 – World Technology Award, finalist for 2006 for Biotechnology: the most innovative people in the science and technology world in 2006
- 2006 – Elected a Fellow of the World Technology Network for Biotechnology for contribution to Epigenetics technology
- 2004 – The Ruby Payne-Scott Award for women in Australian science
- 2004 – German Science Prize "Biochemisch Analytik Preis" (50,000 Euros) for outstanding contribution for Methylation analysis. Since 1970, this award has recognized the work of 27 scientists, four of whom have subsequently gone on to win a Nobel Prize
- 2003 – Julian Wells Medal for "outstanding contribution to gene action and genome structure", Lorne Genome conference

== Selected publications ==
1. Chen, W., Zeng, Y. C., Achinger-Kawecka, J., Campbell, E., Jones, A. K., Stewart, A. G., ... & Clark, S. J. (2024). Machine learning enables pan-cancer identification of mutational hotspots at persistent CTCF binding sites. Nucleic Acids Research, gkae530. https://doi.org/10.1093/nar/gkae530
2. Chitty, J. L., Yam, M., Perryman, L., Parker, A. L., Skhinas, J. N., Setargew, Y. F., ... & Cox, T. R. (2023). A first-in-class pan-lysyl oxidase inhibitor impairs stromal remodeling and enhances gemcitabine response and survival in pancreatic cancer. Nature Cancer, 4(9), 1326-1344. https://doi.org/10.1038/s43018-023-00614-y
3. Pidsley, R., Zotenko, E., Peters, T. J., Lawrence, M. G., Risbridger, G. P., Molloy, P., ... & Clark, S. J. (2016). Critical evaluation of the Illumina MethylationEPIC BeadChip microarray for whole-genome DNA methylation profiling. Genome biology, 17, 1-17. https://doi.org/10.1186/s13059-016-1066-1
4. Peters, T. J., Buckley, M. J., Statham, A. L., Pidsley, R., Samaras, K., V Lord, R., ... & Molloy, P. L. (2015). De novo identification of differentially methylated regions in the human genome. Epigenetics & chromatin, 8, 1-16. https://doi.org/10.1186/1756-8935-8-6
5. Van Dijk, S. J., Molloy, P. L., Varinli, H., Morrison, J. L., & Muhlhausler, B. S. (2015). Epigenetics and human obesity. International journal of obesity, 39(1), 85-97. https://doi.org/10.1038/ijo.2014.34
6. Wiklund, E. D., Bramsen, J. B., Hulf, T., Dyrskjøt, L., Ramanathan, R., Hansen, T. B., ... & Clark, S. J. (2011). Coordinated epigenetic repression of the miR‐200 family and miR‐205 in invasive bladder cancer. International journal of cancer, 128(6), 1327-1334. https://doi.org/10.1002/ijc.25461
7. Susan, J. C., Harrison, J., Paul, C. L., & Frommer, M. (1994). High sensitivity mapping of methylated cytosines. Nucleic Acids Research, 22(15), 2990-2997. https://doi.org/10.1093/nar/22.15.2990
