= OsmY RNA motif =

osmY
- Consensus secondary structure and sequence conservation of osmY RNA

Identifiers
- Symbol: osmY
- Rfam: RF03036

Other data
- RNA type: Gene; sRNA
- SO: SO:0001263
- PDB structures: PDBe

The osmY RNA motif is a conserved RNA structure that was discovered by bioinformatics. osmY motif RNAs are found in Enterobacteriaceae organisms, although it is not predicted to reside in Escherichia coli.

All known osmY RNAs occur upstream of osmY genes, which encode proteins that are either secreted out of the cell, or are present in the periplasm in some organisms. The osmY RNA motif exhibits little conserved sequence in comparison to many known RNAs, although its secondary structure is well conserved. It is generally located nearby to the Shine-Dalgarno sequence of the downstream gene. Presumably, the RNAs function as cis-regulatory elements, however the poor sequence conservation makes it difficult to determine if there are more diverged homologous sequences that might occur in different genetic locations.
