= Leaky scanning =

Mechanism in eukaryotic translation

Leaky scanning is a mechanism used during the initiation phase of eukaryotic translation that enables regulation of gene expression. During initiation, the small 40S ribosomal subunit (as a 43S PIC) "scans" or moves in a 5' → 3' direction along the 5'UTR to locate a start codon to commence elongation. Sometimes, the scanning ribosome bypasses the initial AUG start codon and begins translation at further downstream AUG start codons. Translation in eukaryotic cells according to most scanning mechanisms occurs at the AUG start codon proximal to the 5' end of mRNA; however, the scanning ribosome may encounter an “unfavorable nucleotide context” around the start codon and continue scanning.

There are certain instances where initiation has been found to occur upstream at a non-AUG codon. Eukaryotic genes containing consistent G-C rich leader sequences are frequently observed performing this mechanism. It is hypothesized that scanning is slowed due to a secondary structure which allows for the binding of Met-tRNA with the mismatch codon.

Several viruses use a leaky scanning mechanism to produce viral proteins which implies that leaky scanning is not a consequence of inadequacy, but instead allows viruses to overcome the high selective pressures of competing with their hosts. Molecular biologists are narrowing the search of the ideal nucleotide environment for initiation of translation, and the mechanisms by which viruses replicate.

== Discovery ==
Through several studies Marilyn Kozak was the first to recognize the main role of scanning during initiation of translation in mammalian cells. The AUG codon in mammals is optimally recognized by the context GCCRCCAUGG, also known as a “Kozak Consensus Sequence.” Purine (R) and each of the nucleotides within this sequence are highly conserved and provide an important function in recognition and initiation of translation for many 40S ribosomal subunits. With an optimal context at an AUG start codon, ribosomes will begin initiation at that point. A weak context occurs when the sequences adjacent to the AUG start codon has deviated from the consensus sequence. A few ribosomes will still initiate translation in the weak location, but the majority will perform leaky scanning and initiate downstream. As a consequence, different proteins are likely to be produced.

== See also ==
- Eukaryotic translation
- 5'UTR
- uORF
