= Glaus =

Glaus is a surname. Notable people with the surname include:

- Gilbert Glaus (born 1955), Swiss road bicycle racer
- Troy Glaus (born 1976), American baseball player

== See also ==
- Claus
- Summer Glau (born 1981), American actress
