= Lesley Campbell =

Australian endocrinologist and researcher

Lesley Veronica Campbell AM is an Australian endocrinologist and Professor of Medicine with a special interest in clinical diabetes, appetite and metabolism. She is a principal research fellow at the Garvan Institute of Medical Research in Sydney, Australia.

== Education and career ==
Campbell graduated from Sydney University in 1968. She became a member of the Royal College of Physicians in Great Britain and the Royal Australasian College of Physicians in 1973. She joined the Garvan Institute 1979 as a principal researcher and has remained there since and is the group leader of their Diabetes and Obesity Clinical Studies program. She is also director of diabetes services at St Vincent's Hospital in Sydney. She was appointed Professor of Medicine at the University of New South Wales. Campbell published more than 240 scientific papers. She is an advocate of an attitude that does not stigmatise those that are overweight or the parents of obese children and points out that 30% of those considered as obese are actually in good health.

== Awards and recognition ==
Campbell was awarded Fellowship of both the Royal Australasian College of Physicians (1977) and the British Royal College of Physicians (1989).

Year	Award
2014	Sir Kempson Maddox Award from Diabetes Australia – NSW
2013	Honorary Life Membership of Australian Diabetes Society
2008	Member of the Order of Australia (AM)
2001	Medal Swedish Society of Medicine
2000	Visiting Fellowship Harvard School of Population Health
1989	Fellowship Royal British College of Physicians
1977	Fellowship Royal Australasian College of Physicians

== Publications ==
- Campbell, L. V.; Chisholm, D. J. (1999), 'The United Kingdom prospective diabetes study (UKPDS)', in Diabetes in the New Millenium, edn. Original, Endocrinology & Diabetes Research Foundation, Sydney, NSW, pp. 219 - 226
- Campbell, L.; Rubin, A. L. (2011), 'Diabetes for Dummies', John Wiley & Sons Inc, US. ISBN 9780730375005.
- Campbell, L. (2012), 'Type 2 Diabetes for Dummies', John Wiley & Sons Inc, US. ISBN 9781118303627.
