= Susan Clark (disambiguation) =

Susan Clark is a Canadian actress.

Susan Clark may also refer to:

- Susan Clark (sailor) (died 2012), American sailor
- Susan E. Clark, American astrophysicist and professor
- Susan J. Clark, Australian biomedical researcher

== See also ==
- Sue Clark, multiple people
- Suzanne P. Clark, American business executive
