= Paul Justin Compton =

Emeritus professor

Paul Compton
- Born: 27 December 1944 (age 81)
- Died: 28 May 2025; Randwick
- Occupation: Emeritus Professor
- Employer: University of New South Wales
- Known for: Ripple-down rules research and former Head of the UNSW School of Computer Science and Engineering
- Title: Professor
- Predecessor: (Head of School) Arun Sharma
- Successor: (Head of School) Maurice Pagnucco
- Website: http://www.cse.unsw.edu.au/~compton

Paul Compton (born 1944) was an emeritus professor at the University of New South Wales (UNSW). He was also the former head of the UNSW School of Computer Science and Engineering. He is known for proposing "ripple-down rules". Notices

== Career ==
Compton worked at the Garvan Institute before his appointment at UNSW. He was the head of school from 1996 to 1998, and again from 2003 to 2010. He was very popular as head of school, and upon his retirement a large gathering fare-welled him, as well as creating a YouTube slide-show tribute.

== Research ==
Compton along with R. Jansen proposed "ripple-down rules" in 1988.

=== PhD graduates ===
- Tri Minh Cao
- Angela Finlayson
- Mihye Kim
- Maria Lee
- Ashesh Mahidadia
- Tim Menzies
- Akara Prayote
- Debbie Richards
- Pramod Singh
- Hendra Suryanto

== Journals (2001–2005) ==
1 Compton, P., Peters, L., Edwards, G., and Lavers, T.G., Experience with Ripple-Down Rules. Knowledge-Based System Journal: p. in press, 2006 (accepted July 30, 2005)

2 Kim, M. and Compton, P., The perceived utility of standard ontologies in document management for specialized domains. International Journal of Human-Computer Studies: p. in press, 2005.

3 Kim, M. and Compton, P., Evolutionary Document Management and Retrieval for Specialized Domains on the Web. International Journal of Human Computer Studies. 60(2): p. 201-241, 2004.

4 Ruiz-S‡nchez, J.M., Valencia-Garc’a, R., Fern‡ndez-Breis, J.T., Mart’nez-BŽjar, R., and Compton, P., An approach for incremental knowledge acquisition from text. Expert Systems with Applications. 25(2): p. 77-86, 2003.

5 Mart’nez-BŽjar, R., Iba–ez-Cruz, F., Compton, P., and Cao, T.M., An easy-maintenance, reusable approach for building knowledge-based systems: application to landscape assessment. Expert Systems with Applications. 20: p. 153-162, 2001.

== Patent (2003) ==
6 Compton, P., Edwards, G., Lazarus, L., Peters, L., and Harries, M., Knowledge Based System, U.P. Office, 2003.

== International conference and workshops Ð refereed papers (2001–2005) ==
7 Park, S.S., Kim, Y.S., Park, G.C., Kang, B.H., and Compton, P. Automated Information Mediator for HTML and XML based Web Information Delivery Service. in 18th Australian Joint Conference on Artificial Intelligence (AI 2005). Sydney: Springer, p. 401-405. 2005.

8 Cao, T.M. and Compton, P. A Simulation Framework for Knowledge Acquisition Evaluation. in Twenty-Eighth Australasian Computer Science Conference (ACSC2005). Newcastle, p. 353-360, 2005.

9 Suryanto, H. and Compton, P. Invented Predicates to Reduce Knowledge Acquisition. in Engineering Knowledge in the Age of the Semantic Web (EKAW 2004). Whittleburg Hall, UK: Springer, p. 293-306, 2004.

10 Singh, P. and Compton, P. Evolution Oriented Semi-Supervised Approach for Segmentation of Medical Images. in Proceedings of ICISIP 2004. India: IEEE, p. 77-81, 2004.

11 Mahidadia, A. and Compton, P. Knowledge Management in Data and Knowledge Intensive Environments. in Practical Aspects of Knowledge Management: 5th International Conference, PAKM 2004: Springer-Verlag, p. 106 Ð 116, 2004.

12 Compton, P., Cao, T., and Kerr, J. Generalising Incremental Knowledge Acquisition. in Proceedings of the Pacific Knowledge Acquisition Workshop 2004. Auckland: University of Tasmania Eprints repository, p. 44 Ð 53, 2004.

13 Cao, T., Martin, E., and Compton, P. On the Convergence of Incremental Knowledge Case Construction. in Discovery Science (Lecture Notes in Artificial Intelligence 3245): Springer, p. 207-218, 2004.

14 Finlayson, A. and Compton, P. Incremental Knowledge Acquisition using RDR for Soccer Simulation. in Proceedings of the Pacific Knowledge Acquisition Workshop 2004. Auckland: University of Tasmania Eprints repository, p. 102-116, 2004.

15 Misra, A., Sowmya, A., and Compton, P. Incremental Learning of Control Knowledge for Lung Boundary Extraction. in Proceedings of the Pacific Knowledge Acquisition Workshop 2004. Auckland: University of Tasmania Eprints repository, p. 211-225, 2004.

16 Suryanto, H. and Compton, P. Invented Predicates to Reduce Knowledge Acquisition Effort. in Proceedings of the IJCAI-2003 Workshop on Mixed-Initiative Intelligent Systems. Acapulco, p. 107-114, 2003.

17 Kerr, J. and Compton, P. Toward Generic Model-based Object Recognition by Knowledge Acquisition and Machine Learning. in Proceedings of the IJCAI-2003 Workshop on Mixed-Initiative Intelligent Systems. Acapulco, p. 80-86, 2003.

18 Ho, V., Wobcke, W., and Compton, P. EMMA: An E-mail Management Assistant. in IEEE/WIC International Conference on Intelligent Agent Technology. Los Alamitos, CA: IEEE, p. 67-74, 2003.

19 Suryanto, H. and Compton, P. Intermediate Concept Discovery in Ripple Down Rule Knowledge Bases. in the 2002 Pacific Rim Knowledge Acquisition Workshop (PKAW 2002). Tokyo, p. 233-245, 2002.

20 Kim, M. and Compton, P. Web-Based Document Management for Specialised Domains. in 13th International Conference on Knowledge Engineering and Knowledge Management: Ontologies and the Semantic Web (EKAW 2002). SigŸenza, Spain: Springer, p. 43-48, 2002.

21 Kerr, J. and Compton, P. Interactive Learning when Human and Machine Utilise Different Feature Spaces. in The 2002 Pacific Rim Knowledge Acquisition Workshop. Tokyo, Japan, p. 15-29, 2002.

22 Suryanto, H. and Compton, P. Discovery of Ontologies from Knowledge Bases. in Proceedings of the First International Conference on Knowledge Capture. Victoria, Canada: The Association for Computing Machinery, New York, p. 171-178, 2001.

23 Mart’nez-BŽjar, R., Ib‡–ez-Cruz, F., Compton, P., Fern‡ndez-Breis, J.T., and De las Heras-Gonz‡lez, M. Integrating Ripple Down Rules with Ontologies in an Oncology Domain. in Artificial Intelligence Medicine, 8th Conference on AI in Medicine in Europe, AIME 2001 (Lecture Notes in Computer Science 2101). Cascais, Portugal: Springer, p. 324-327, 2001.

24 Mahidadia, A. and Compton, P. Assisting model-discovery in neuroendocrinology. in Discovery Science: 4th Internalional Conference, DS2001. Washington: Springer, p. 214-227, 2001.

25 Kim, M. and Compton, P. Formal concept analysis for domain-specific document retrieval systems. in AI 2001: Advances in Artificial Intelligence: 14th Australian Joint Conference on Artificial Intelligence (AI'01). Adelaide: Springer-Verlag, p. 47-60, 2001.

26 Kim, M. and Compton, P. Incremental development of domain-specific document retrieval systems. in Workshop on knowledge markup and semantic annotation. Victoria BC Canada, p. 69-77, 2001.

27 Kim, M. and Compton, P. A Web-based Browsing Mechanism Based on Conceptual Structures. in Conceptual Structures: Extracting and Representing Semantics. Proceedings of the 9th International Conference on Conceptual Structures (ICCS 2001). Stanford University, California: CEUR-WS: p. 47-60, 2001.

28 Hoffmann, A.G., Kwok, R., and Compton, P. Using subclasses to improve classification learning. in European Conference on Machine Learning, (Lecture Notes in Artificial Intelligence 2167). Freiburg: Springer-Verlag, p. 203-213, 2001.
