= Chris Goodnow =

Australian immunologists (born 1959)

Chris Goodnow FAA, FRS
- Born: Hong Kong
- Education: University of Sydney; Stanford University
- Scientific career
- Workplaces: Stanford University School of Medicine; Howard Hughes Medical Institute; John Curtin School of Medical Research; Australian National University; Garvan Institute of Medical Research

Christopher Carl Goodnow (born 19 September 1959) is an immunology researcher and the current executive director of the Garvan Institute of Medical Research. He holds the Bill and Patricia Ritchie Foundation Chair and is a Conjoint Professor in the faculty of medicine at UNSW Sydney. He holds dual Australian and US citizenship.

== Career ==
Born in Hong Kong in 1959 to Robert Goodnow and Jacqueline J. Goodnow AC, Goodnow grew up in Rome and Washington DC before moving to Sydney, Australia as a teenager. He trained in veterinary medicine and surgery, immunochemistry and immunology at the University of Sydney and in DNA technology at Stanford University. After doctoral studies at Melbourne's Walter and Eliza Hall Institute of Medical Research and the University of Sydney, he joined the faculty of the Stanford University Medical School and the Howard Hughes Medical Institute in 1990. There he established the concept of multiple immune tolerance checkpoints, a framework now widely used in cancer treatment with "checkpoint inhibitors", and revealed the function of key genes in these checkpoints.

In 1997 Goodnow joined the faculty at the Australian National University as professor and founding director of the Medical Genome Centre, leading its development into a major national research facility, the Australian Phenomics Facility. In 2015 he joined the Garvan Institute of Medical Research as deputy director to translate genomic DNA sequence analysis of the human immune system into understanding the cause of immune disorders and developing more effective, personalised treatments. During this period Goodnow oversaw the development of the Garvan-Weizmann Centre for Cellular Genomics in partnership with the Weizmann Institute of Science in Israel, the only multidisciplinary centre of its kind in the southern hemisphere as well as playing a key role in the development of the Clinical Immunogenomics Research Consortium Australia (CIRCA). In May 2018, Goodnow was named Executive Director of the Garvan Institute.

== Honours ==
- 1979: John Gurner and Frederick Ebsworth Prize for Biology, University of Sydney
- 1984: Honours Class I with B.V.Sc. degree; Honours Class I and University Medal with B.Sc.(Vet) degree
- 1986: National Health and Medical Research Council Biomedical Research Scholarship
- 1989: Medical Foundation Postdoctoral Fellowship
- 1992–95: Searle Scholar
- 1998: American Association of Immunologists/Pharmingen Investigator Award
- 2001: Centenary Medal for services to Australian society and science in systems and control theory
- 2001: Australian Academy of Science Gottschalk Medal
- 2002: Elected a Fellow of the Australian Academy of Science
- 2005: Australian Health Ministers Award for Excellence in Health and Medical Research
- 2006: Australian Research Council Federation Fellow
- 2006: American Association of Immunologists Distinguished Lecturer
- 2007: Ramaciotti Biomedical Research Award
- 2009: Elected a Fellow of The Royal Society, the UK and British Commonwealth academy of science (confirmed 2009-05-15)
- 2010: Australasian Society for Immunology Burnet Orator
- 2010: National Health and Medical Research Council of Australia Fellow
- 2010: Ramaciotti Medal for Excellence in Biomedical Research
- 2012: Glaxo-Smith-Kline Award for Research Excellence
- 2013: Elected Member of the US National Academy of Sciences
- 2015–2016: President of the Australasian Society for Immunology
- 2025: Crafoord Prize in Polyarthritis.
- 2027: Paul Ehrlich and Ludwig Darmstaedter Prize

== Other interests ==
Goodnow is well known for leading a 1980 expedition to Indonesia's remote Mentawai Islands off the coast of Sumatra, discovering the now-famous surf breaks and a wave that is today considered one of the world's best, Macaronis.

== External ==
- Biography – Australian National University
- Australian Phenomics Facility
