= Garvan Institute of Medical Research =

Australian biomedical institute in Sydney

- Founder: Sisters of Charity
- Established: 1963; 63 years ago
- Mission: Medical research
- Director: Professor Benjamin Kile
- Faculty: University of New South Wales
- Adjunct faculty: St Vincent's Hospital, Sydney
- Staff: approx. 750
- Location: Victoria Street, Darlinghurst, Sydney, New South Wales, Australia
- Website: www.garvan.org.au

The Garvan Institute of Medical Research is an Australian biomedical research institute located in Darlinghurst, Sydney, New South Wales. Founded in 1963 by the Sisters of Charity as a research department of St Vincent's Hospital, it is now one of Australia's largest medical research institutions, with approximately 750 scientists, students and support staff.

== History ==
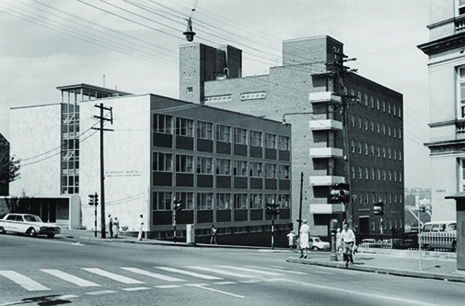
Original Garvan Institute building, opened in 1963.

Funds for its establishment were provided by a centenary hospital appeal by the Sisters of Charity for St Vincent's Hospital. Helen Mills, the largest donor, asked for the centre to be named after her father James Patrick Garvan, a distinguished New South Wales parliamentarian and business leader.

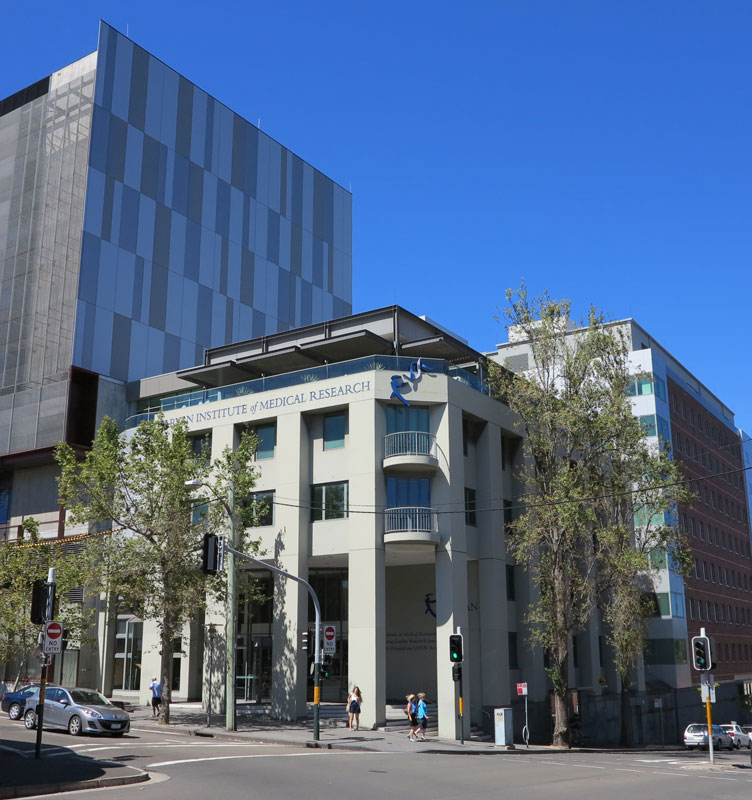
The current Garvan Institute building, completed in 1997, with the Kinghorn Cancer Centre to the left

The Kinghorn Cancer Centre, a A$100 million joint venture between Garvan and St Vincent's Hospital, was opened on 28 August 2012 by Prime Minister Julia Gillard. The centre is named after the Kinghorn Foundation, one of the centre's main benefactors.

In 2014, the institute became one of only three organisations in the world able to sequence the human genome at a base cost below US$1,000 each (the $1,000 genome) when it purchased the next generation of genome-sequencing equipment, which is capable of sequencing 350 genomes a week (18,000 a year).

Professor Chris Goodnow, internationally renowned immunologist, became Executive Director in 2018. He oversaw the development of rapid and affordable genome sequencing and the growing application of personalised medicine.

In 2023, Prof Benjamin Kile, an internationally recognised and highly regarded blood cell molecular biologist, was appointed Executive Director. Kile has refined the Institute’s strategic focus to genomics, immunology and cancer.

== Research ==
Garvan's medical research is focused on genomics, cancer and immunology

Researchers works across the three above themes, with teams divided into eight divisionsresearch programs.

- Genomics and Inherited Disease: Harnessing genomics to accelerate the diagnosis and treatment of inherited disease.
- Translational Genomics: Unpacking disease through the cell and the genome.
- Centre for Population Genomics: Building the largest and most inclusive genomic databases to ensure all Australian communities benefit from genomic health advances. The Centre is a collaboration with the Murdoch Children’s Research Institute.
- Cancer Ecosystems: Using the latest molecular techniques to understand the biological systems driving cancer growth.
- Cancer Plasticity and Dormancy: Developing new treatment paradigms to overcome treatment resistance in cancer.
- Translational Oncology: Transforming cancer therapy and improving patient outcomes.
- Precision Immunology: Transform the diagnosis and treatment of diseases affecting the immune system.
- Immune Biotherapies: Using mammalian and bacterial immune targeting systems to develop new therapies and better understand the immune system.

== Directors ==
Garvan is affiliated with UNSW Sydney. PhD and Masters by Research candidates are enrolled through UNSW Sydney and conduct their research at the Institute under the supervision of a panel approved by both UNSW and Garvan.

The Institute hosts a series of free public seminar s and tours every year to share its research findings and behind the scenes access to the Institute with the public.

== Directors ==
Order	Incumbent	Start date	End date	Time in office	Notes
1	John Hickie, Gerry Milton, Leslie Lazarus	1966	1969	2–3 years	
2	Leslie Lazarus	1969	1990	20–21 years	
3	John Shine	1990	2012	21–22 years	
4	John Mattick	2012	31 May 2018	5–6 years	
5	Chris Goodnow	1 June 2018	22 July 2022	8 years, 143 days	
6	Benjamin Kile	27 April 2023	incumbent	3 years, 178 days	

== Other notable staff ==
- Professor Chris Goodnow BVSc, PhD, FAA FRS - Deputy Director and Laboratory Head
- Professor Susan Clark – Head of the Cancer Epigenetics Laboratory
- Associate Professor Jodie Ingles – Director of the Genomics of Inherited Disease Program and Head of the Clinical Genomics Laboratory
- Professor Jonathan Sprent FRS – Heads of the Cellular Immunity Laboratory
- Professor Lesley Campbell - formerly Principal Research Fellow
- Professor Vanessa Hayes - Laboratory Head, Human Comparative and Prostate Cancer Genomics
- Dr Russell Howard - Commercial Strategy Advisor, Kinghorn Centre for Clinical Genomics
- Professor David James FAA – formerly head of the Diabetes and Obesity division
- Associate Professor Amanda Salis – formerly leader of the Eating Disorders research group

== See also ==
- Health in Australia
- Connie Johnson (fundraiser)
