= Multiple-classification ripple-down rules =

Knowledge acquisition technique

Multiple-classification ripple-down rules (MCRDR) is an incremental knowledge acquisition technique which preserves the benefits and essential strategy of ripple-down rules (RDR) in handling the multiple classifications. MCRDR, the extension of RDR, is based on the assumption that the knowledge an expert provides is essentially a justification for a conclusion in a particular context.

== Implementations ==
Below is a list of implementations of MCRDR

- The alpha version of RDR(MCRDR) Framework was developed by UNSW and UTAS Research Team and funded by ARC (System available at BESTRDR)
- RDR(MCRDR) document classifier was developed by Dr.Yang Sok Kim and AProf.Byeong Ho Kang (System available at BESTRDR)
- RDR(MCRDR) smart expert system was developed by UTAS Research Team and funded by Hyundai Steel.
- Pacific Knowledge Systems (PKS) uses a commercial product called RippleDown Expert that is based on Multiple Classification Ripple Down Rules
- Medscope Medication Review Mentor uses Multiple Classification Ripple Down Rules to identify adverse drug interactions with a patient's medicines regimen

== BEST RDR Warehouse ==
BEST-RDR (Best Expert System Technique – Ripple Down Rule) website is freely accessible RDR publication and system warehouse that helps you to find programs and publications about RDR. A great amount of publications and programs based on RDR (MCRDR) are available to public.

What functions are available in the BEST RDR?

1. BEST-RDR website provides detailed explanation of what the RDR and MCRDR are
2. BEST-RDR provides every RDR(MCRDR) publication details from 1987 to 2013.
3. BEST-RDR provides sources of various RDR(MCRDR) based system for download

== See also ==
- Ripple-down rules
- Case-based reasoning
- Decision trees
