= Amanda Sainsbury-Salis =

Australian scientist

- Born: Amanda Sainsbury; 1969 (age 56–57); Sydney, New South Wales
- Education: University of Western Australia; University of Geneva
- Scientific career
- Fields: Hypothalamic weight regulation; eating disorders
- Workplaces: Garvan Institute of Medical Research

Amanda Sainsbury-Salis (born 1969) is an Australian medical researcher, educator and author. Her research interests are hypothalamic control of body weight, famine reaction, metabolism, body composition, anorexia, obesity, eating disorders.

== Background and early career ==
Born Amanda Sainsbury in Sydney, New South Wales in 1969, Sainsbury-Salis grew up in Perth, Western Australia. She graduated from the University of Western Australia in 1990. She was the Australian recipient of the Boursière de la Confédération (Swiss Government Scholarship) in 1991 and she received her PhD from the University of Geneva, Switzerland in 1996.

== Scientific career ==
Sainsbury-Salis returned to Australia in 1998 to work at the Garvan Institute of Medical Research where she currently leads a research team. She is also a senior lecturer in the University of New South Wales Faculty of Medicine.

== Published works ==
- Sainsbury-Salis, Amanda (2007). The Don't Go Hungry Diet. Bantam Australia. ISBN 978-1-86325-523-3.
