= Claus Larsen =

Claus Larsen may refer to:

- Claus Bo Larsen (born 1965), Danish football referee
- Claus Bjørn Larsen (born 1963), Danish press photographer
- Claus Larsen (born 1967), founder of Danish industrial acts Leæther Strip and Klutæ
- Claus Larsen (footballer)
- Claus Larsen (archer)
