= Pamela Clauss =

Australian nurse and philanthropist

Pamela Clauss (17 August 1925 – 5 August 2001) was an Australian pioneering nurse, philanthropist and supporter of historical preservation and the arts.

Born as Pamela Heavey in Longueville, New South Wales, a suburb of Sydney, to Alison Maud (née Bennett) and John Aloysius Heavey, a New Zealand Navy veteran who had been decorated during World War I for bravery in the ANZAC landing at Gallipoli in 1915.

She graduated from Sacred Heart College in Kensington, Sydney and went on to attend nursing training at St. Vincent's Hospital, also in Sydney, in 1942. In 1956 following activities in Europe and England she returned to Australia and became a nursing sister in charge of St. Vincent's newly established cardio-thoracic surgical unit. Three years later she went to the Mayo Clinic as part of an exchange-training program, and in 1965 she joined the open-heart surgery team of Dr. Roy H. Clauss (who would become her husband in 1970) and Dr. George Reed in New York City. She went on to pioneer cardiac bypass surgery techniques at the Mayo Clinic, at New York University and at the New York Medical College.

== Philanthropy ==
She was dedicated to the following:

- Inner City Scholarship Fund for the Roman Catholic Archdiocese of New York
- Yorkville Common Pantry (Manhattan)
- Community Board #8 (Manhattan)
- The 74th Street Association (Manhattan)
- Metropolitan Opera and Philharmonic (NYC)

== Personal life ==
She married Dr. Clauss, a widower, in 1970, and remained in Manhattan for the rest of her career and married life until her death. They had no children, but she became stepmother to his three children. She was a devout Roman Catholic, although her husband was a Presbyterian deacon and elder. She died from cancer in 2001, 12 days before her 76th birthday.

Her funeral Mass was held at the Church of St. Ignatius Loyola. She was survived by a large extended family in the USA including her husband Dr. Roy H. Claus (died 2007), stepchildren Roy, Elliot and Jane, and step-grandchildren, including a namesake. She also had an extensive family in Australia including two sisters: Jill and Phillipa, numerous nephews, nieces, and many grand-nephews and nieces. Philippa, was the late wife of Leslie Lazarus, of Sydney, an Officer of the Order of Australia.

== Sources ==
- "Paid Notice: Deaths CLAUSS, PAMELA HEAVEY". The New York Times. 7 August 2001.
