= Michael Birt (biochemist) =

Australian biochemist and academic administrator

Lindsay Michael Birt, AO, CBE (18 January 1932 – 28 October 2001) was the inaugural vice-chancellor of the University of Wollongong between 1975 and 1980, and the fourth vice-chancellor of the University of New South Wales between 1981 and 1992.

== Biography ==
Michael Birt was born on 18 January 1932 in Melbourne, Australia. He was educated at Melbourne Boys High School and the University of Melbourne, where he completed a Bachelor of Agricultural Science, a Bachelor of Science and a PhD in biochemistry.

In 1960, Birt returned to the University of Melbourne taking up the position of lecturer and then senior lecturer in the Department of Biochemistry, where he was remembered for inspiring a passion for biochemistry in his students. In 1967 he was invited to become the inaugural chair and head of the Australian National University Department of Biochemistry, where he remained until his appointment in 1973 as vice-chancellor designate at the Wollongong University College. Foundation vice-chancellor at the University of Wollongong from 1975, Michael Birt then moved on to the vice-chancellorship of the University of New South Wales in 1981.

During his time as vice-chancellor at the University of Wollongong, Birt had been responsible for getting the University of Wollongong up and running, and also preparing it for amalgamation with the Wollongong Teachers College in 1982. He left Wollongong to take on the position of vice-chancellor at the University of New South Wales. In honour of Birt's contribution to the University of Wollongong, its main library is named the Michael Birt Library.

As the vice-chancellor of the University of New South Wales, Birt managed the university through the reintroduction of student fees and oversaw the development of the College of Fine Arts and the Australian Defence Force Academy. In 1993 the Michael Birt Gardens at UNSW were named in honour of Birt's contribution to the UNSW.

Birt was appointed a Commander of the British Empire in 1980 and an Officer of the Order of Australia in 1986. He had two sons with his spouse Jenny.

Birt died on 28 October 2001. Following a burial mass at St Mary's Church, North Sydney he was cremated.

Academic offices
| New title | Vice-Chancellor of the University of Wollongong; 1975 – 1980 | Succeeded by Ken McKinnon |
| Preceded by Sir Rupert Myers | Vice-Chancellor of the University of New South Wales; 1981 – 1992 | Succeeded by John Niland |
