= Lynn Dalgarno =

Australian geneticist (born 1935)

- Born: 12 November 1935 (age 90); Caulfield, Victoria
- Education: Australian National University
- Known for: Shine–Dalgarno sequence
- Scientific career
- Workplaces: University of Melbourne; Australian National University
- Thesis: Respiratory metabolism and processes of uptake in a plant tissue (1962)
- Doctoral advisor: L. M. Birt

Lynn Dalgarno (born 12 November 1935) is an Australian geneticist known for the discovery of the Shine–Dalgarno sequence with his graduate student, John Shine.

== Early life and education ==
The son of Frederick Leslie Roy Dalgarno and Nadine Ilma (née Rankin) Dalgarno, Lynn Dalgarno was born at Berklea Private Hospital, Caulfield, Victoria on 13 November 1935.

Dalgarno was awarded a B.Sc.(Agr.) in 1958, conducting research with F. J. R. Hird at the Departments of Biochemistry and Agriculture, University of Melbourne, and a Ph.D. in 1962, from the Australian National University (ANU), with a dissertation titled, Respiratory metabolism and processes of uptake in a plant tissue, with research advisor, L. M. Birt at The Russell Grimwade School of Biochemistry, University of Melbourne.

== Career ==
In his early career (between 1963 and 1967) Dalgarno conducted research, first at the Medical Research Council's National Institute for Medical Research supported by a University of Melbourne Traveling Scholarship to London (with Edward M. Martin, collaborating with E. Horton, S. L. Liu, T. S. Work, and R. A. Cox); second, with François Gros at the Institut de Biologie Physico-Chimique on an MRC-CNRS Exchange Scholarship; and third, a postdoctoral fellowship assisted by a U.S. Public Health Research Grant at California Institute of Technology, with Robert L. Sinsheimer.

In 1968 Dalgarno accepted a post at ANU as a Senior Lecturer, and then as a Reader from 1983 until 1996, when he subsequently became a Research Fellow. His graduate student John Shine said Dalgarno was "a fantastic, enthusiastic lecturer, who was turned on by this molecular biology."

Dalgarno and Shine found the Shine–Dalgarno sequence, described by ANU as "the beginnings of biotechnology":

In 1973, Lynn Dalgarno, from the ANU Department of Biochemistry, and his PhD student John Shine, proposed an initiating signal for protein synthesis in prokaryotic cells. This ribosomal binding site in bacterial messenger RNA became known as the Shine–Dalgarno (SD) sequence. It enables initiation of protein synthesis by aligning the ribosome with the start codon. Simply put, genes are read in groups of three letters, but you need to let the ribosome know where to start. For example, if you read "Our dog can see the cat", it makes sense, but if you shift the starting point by one letter, it becomes "urd ogc ans eet hec ato". The SD sequence tells the bacteria where to start protein synthesis so that the genes are read correctly.

One of Dalgarno's colleague wrote,

Especially noteworthy was the work of Lynn Dalgarno and his PhD student John Shine. Their pioneering work on the nature of initiating signals for protein synthesis in prokaryotic cells was published in Nature and received much international acclaim. More specifically they proposed that the pyrimidine-rich 3'- terminal ten nucleotides of the small ribosomal RNA of prokaryotes is involved in a direct, base-pairing interaction with a purine-rich section (known as the Shine–Dalgarno sequence) of the ribosome binding site of messenger RNA.

— Fyfe Bygrave

== Selected publications ==
- Shine, John; Dalgarno, Lynn (1975). "Determinant of cistron specificity in bacterial ribosomes". Nature. 254 (5495): 34–38. Bibcode:1975Natur.254...34S. doi:10.1038/254034a0. PMID 803646. S2CID 4162567.
- Shine, John; Dalgarno, Lynne (September 1975). "Terminal-Sequence Analysis of Bacterial Ribosomal RNA". European Journal of Biochemistry. 57 (1): 221–230. doi:10.1111/j.1432-1033.1975.tb02294.x. PMID 809282.
- Dalgarno, L.; Shine, J. (31 October 1973). "Conserved Terminal Sequence in 18S rRNA May Represent Terminator Anticodons". Nature New Biology. 245 (148): 261–262. doi:10.1038/newbio245261a0. ISSN 0090-0028. PMID 4202225.
- Dalgarno, L.; Sinsheimer, R. L. (August 1968). "Process of infection with bacteriophage phiX174. XXIV. New type of temperature-sensitive mutant". Journal of Virology. 2 (8): 822–829. doi:10.1128/JVI.2.8.822-829.1968. ISSN 0022-538X. PMC 375696. PMID 4883013.
- Dalgarno, L.; Gros, F. (18 March 1968). "RNA synthesis in "relaxed" and "stringent" Escherichia coli. Breakdown of performed ribonucleoprotein particles and subsequent RNA synthesis". Biochimica et Biophysica Acta. 157 (1): 64–75. ISSN 0006-3002. PMID 4868547.
- Dalgarno, L.; Gros, F. (March 1968). "Completion of ribosomal particles in E. coli during inhibition of protein synthesis". Biochimica et Biophysica Acta (BBA) - Nucleic Acids and Protein Synthesis. 157 (1): 52–63. doi:10.1016/0005-2787(68)90263-3. PMID 4868250.
- Dalgarno, L.; Cox, R.A.; Martin, E.M. (18 April 1967). "Polyribosomes in normal Krebs 2 ascites tumor cells and in cells infected with encephalomyocarditis virus". Biochimica et Biophysica Acta (BBA) - Nucleic Acids and Protein Synthesis. 138 (2): 316–328. doi:10.1016/0005-2787(67)90492-3. PMID 4292778.
- Dalgarno, L.; Martin, E.M.; Liu, S.-L.; Work, T.S. (January 1966). "Characterization of the products formed by the RNA polymerases of cells infected with encephalomyocarditis virus". Journal of Molecular Biology. 15 (1): 77–91. doi:10.1016/S0022-2836(66)80210-3. PMID 4287898.
- Dalgarno, L; Martin, E.M (July 1965). "Studies on EMC viral RNA synthesis and its localization in infected krebs ascites cells". Virology. 26 (3): 450–465. doi:10.1016/0042-6822(65)90008-5. PMID 14319717.
- Horton, E.; Liu, S.-L.; Dalgarno, L.; Martin, E. M.; Work, T. S. (17 October 1964). "Development of Ribonucleic Acid Polymerase in Cells Infected with Encephalomyocarditis Virus and the Synthesis of Single- and Double-Stranded RNA by the Isolated Polymerase". Nature. 204 (4955): 247–250. Bibcode:1964Natur.204..247H. doi:10.1038/204247a0. ISSN 0028-0836. PMID 14212417. S2CID 4221643.
- Dalgarno, L; Birt, Lm (1 June 1963). "Free fatty acids in carrot-tissue preparations and their effect on isolated carrot mitochondria". Biochemical Journal. 87 (3): 586–596. doi:10.1042/bj0870586. ISSN 0006-2936. PMC 1202005. PMID 14024731.
- Dalgarno, L; Birt, Lm (1 January 1963). "The activities of some particulate and non-particulate oxidative enzymes in carrot tissue". Biochemical Journal. 86 (1): 46–56. doi:10.1042/bj0860046. ISSN 0006-2936. PMC 1201709. PMID 14024732.
- Dalgarno, L.; Birt, L. M. (April 1962). "Preparation and properties of a mitochondrial fraction from carrot tissue". The Biochemical Journal. 83 (1): 195–202. doi:10.1042/bj0830195. ISSN 0264-6021. PMC 1243527. PMID 16748945.
- Dalgarno, L; Birt, Lm (1 April 1962). "Aspects of malate metabolism by slices and mitochondria from carrot tissue". Biochemical Journal. 83 (1): 202–211. doi:10.1042/bj0830202. ISSN 0006-2936. PMC 1243528. PMID 16748947.
