= Klaus (disambiguation) =

Klaus is both a German given name and a surname.

Klaus may also refer to:

- Klaus, Vorarlberg, a town in Austria
- Klaus Advanced Computing Building, at the Georgia Institute of Technology
- Klaus (storm), a 2009 European cyclone
- Hurricane Klaus, used in 1984 and 1990 to name two category 1 hurricanes, retired after 1990 season and replaced with Kyle
- Klaus (comics), a 2015 comic book mini-series
- Klaus (film), a 2019 animated Christmas film
- Klaus, German spelling of Kloyz, a prayer house in Judaism
- Klaus (The Vampire Diaries), an episode of the TV series The Vampire Diaries
