= Roy Clauss =

Roy H. Clauss (February 8, 1923, in Melrose Park, Illinois – July 7, 2007 in New York City) was an American pioneering cardiovascular and thoracic surgeon.

During his career, Clauss helped develop and perfect a variety of techniques involved in the performance of open heart surgery and cardiac bypass surgery, and helped pioneer bilateral carotid artery surgery. He authored over 150 medical articles.

In 1971 he co-authored Remedial Arterial Disease with the late Dr. Walter Redisch. Clauss and his second wife, Pamela Heavey Clauss, a surgical and heart pump nurse, along with Greek surgeon, Dr. George Sanoudos, established the first open heart surgery facility in Athens, Greece in the mid-1970s.

== Personal life ==
Clauss graduated from Northwestern University in 1943 and from its medical school in 1947. Clauss married Jane Hamden of Oak Park, Illinois in 1945, by whom he had three children. A widower, Clauss married his second wife, Pamela Heavey in 1970; they remained married until her death in 2001.

He was a patron of the Metropolitan Opera and the New York Philharmonic. Clauss was a deacon and elder of the Fifth Avenue Presbyterian Church. In 1993, he was one of the founding members of The City Church in Manhattan. He died at the age of 84 in 2007.
