= PDLIM2 =

Protein-coding gene in the species Homo sapiens

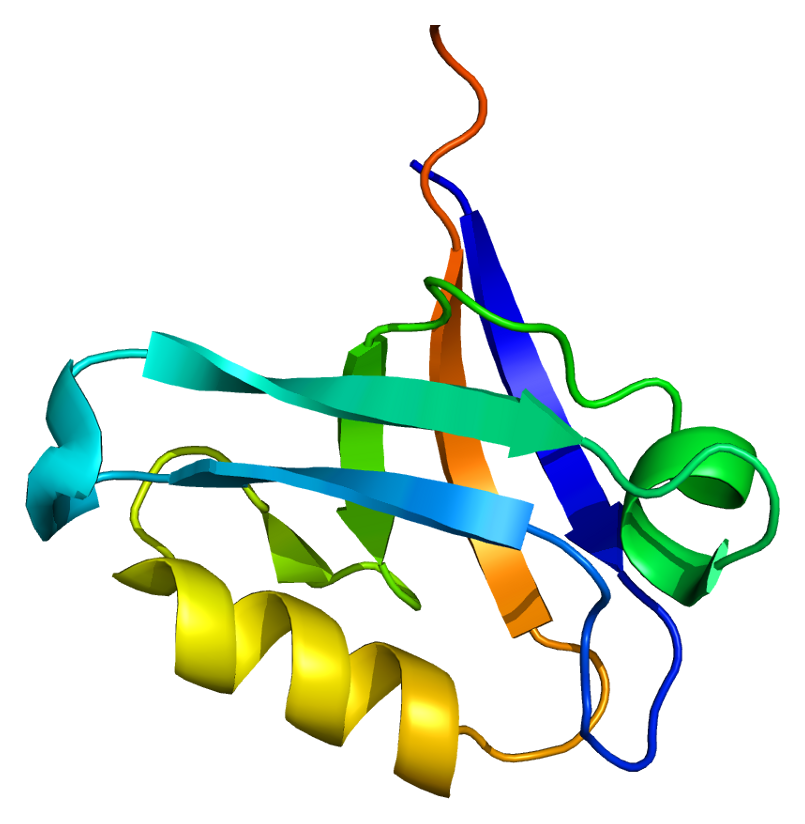

Identifiers
- Aliases: PDLIM2, MYSTIQUE, SLIM, PDZ and LIM domain 2
- External IDs: OMIM: 609722; MGI: 2384850; GeneCards: PDLIM2
Available structures
| PDB | Ortholog search: PDBe RCSB |
| PDB | List of PDB id codes 2PA1, 3PDV |

Gene location (Human)
| Chr. | Chromosome 8 (human) |
| Band | 8p21.3 | Start | 22,578,279 bp |
| Band | 8p21.3 | End | 22,598,025 bp |

Gene location (Mouse)
| Chr. | Chromosome 14 (mouse) |
| Band | 14|14 D2 | Start | 70,401,667 bp |
| Band | 14|14 D2 | End | 70,415,130 bp |
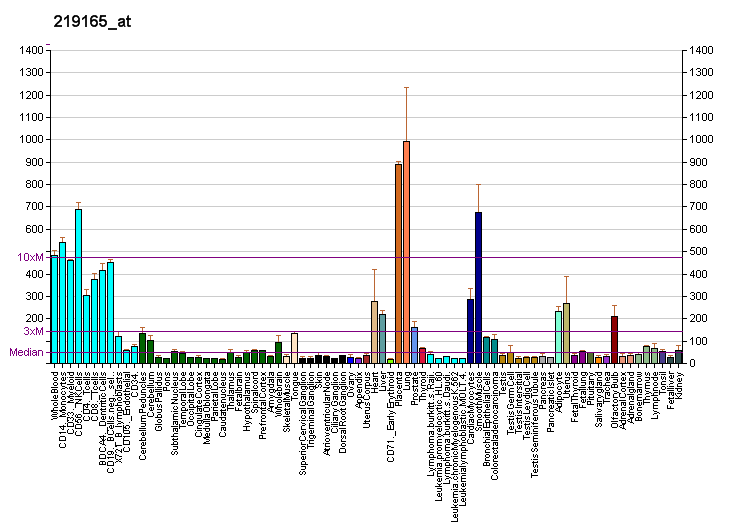
RNA expression pattern
| Bgee | Human / Mouse (ortholog); Top expressed in: spleen; mucosa of pharynx; skin of leg; ascending aorta; skin of abdomen; Descending thoracic aorta; right coronary artery; stromal cell of endometrium; nipple; tibial nerve / Top expressed in: esophagus; lip; granulocyte; right lung; intestinal villus; right lung lobe; calvaria; primary oocyte; left lung; left lung lobe; More reference expression data |
| BioGPS | More reference expression data |
Gene ontology
| Molecular function | protein binding; metal ion binding; actin binding; muscle alpha-actinin binding |
| Cellular component | cytoplasm; cytoskeleton; nucleus; stress fiber; Z discdkac; filamentous actin |
| Biological process | development of the heart; actin cytoskeleton organization; muscle structure development |
Sources:Amigo / QuickGO
Orthologs
| Databases | NCBI: entry; OMA: entry |
| Species | Human | Mouse |
| Entrez | 64236 | 213019 |
| Ensembl | ENSG00000120913 | ENSMUSG00000022090 |
| UniProt | Q96JY6 | Q8R1G6 |
| RefSeq (mRNA) | NM_198042; NM_021630; NM_176871; NM_001368120 | NM_001253736; NM_145978 |
| RefSeq (protein) | NP_067643; NP_789847; NP_932159; NP_001355049 | NP_001240665; NP_666090 |
| Location (UCSC) | Chr 8: 22.58 – 22.6 Mb | Chr 14: 70.4 – 70.42 Mb |
| PubMed search |
- Wikidata
| View/Edit Human | View/Edit Mouse |

PDZ and LIM domain protein 2 is a protein that in humans is encoded by the PDLIM2 gene.
