= Claus Larsen (footballer) =

Danish footballer (1954–2020)

Personal information
- Full name: Claus Bjørn Larsen
- Date of birth: 20 May 1954
- Place of birth: Høje-Taastrup, Denmark
- Date of death: 12 May 2020 (aged 65)
- Position: Forward

Senior career*
Years	Team	Apps	(Gls)
1974–1975	Køge Boldklub		
1975–1976	Sparta Rotterdam	24	(5)
1976–1981	Køge Boldklub		
1981–1984	Kjøbenhavns Boldklub		

International career
1975	Denmark U21	1	(0)
1975	Denmark	3	(0)
- * Club domestic league appearances and goals

Claus Bjørn Larsen (20 May 1954 – 12 May 2020) was a Danish footballer who played as a forward. He played in three matches for the Denmark national team in 1975.
