= Alfred Clauss =

German-American architect

Alfred Clauss (August 23, 1906 – June 8, 1998) was a German-born architect whose practice was centered in Philadelphia, Pennsylvania, for most of his career. He worked on many buildings in the state, as well as collaborating with his wife, architect Jane West Clauss, on one of the earliest International Style housing developments in the United States.

== Education and personal life ==
Alfred Clauss was born in Munich, Germany, in 1906. He studied architecture at the Munich Technical Architectural School, receiving his B.A. in 1926.

In 1934, he married fellow architect Jane West, with whom he had three children.

== Career ==
Clauss began his career working on housing projects in Hamburg with Karl Schneider, but left in 1928 to join the studio of Ludwig Mies van der Rohe, with whom he worked on the German Pavilion for the 1929 Barcelona Exposition.

In 1929, Clauss emigrated to the United States, and by the following year he had taken a job with the Philadelphia firm of Howe & Lescaze, with whom he worked on the landmark PSFS Building. In 1931, he organized a Salon des Refusés for architects who had been excluded from the annual exhibition mounted by the Architectural League of New York. During this period, he also briefly formed a partnership with the architect George Daub, with whom he designed a series of service stations for Standard Oil of Ohio. He also built some models and designed an apartment renovation for Philip Johnson.

Between 1934 and 1945, Clauss and his wife lived in Tennessee, where they collaborated on the design of the prewar "Little Switzerland" suburb of split-level houses outside Knoxville. Sponsored by the Tennessee Valley Authority as part of President Franklin Roosevelt's New Deal, it is regarded as one of the earliest examples of the International Style in the United States.

In 1945, Clauss and his wife settled in Philadelphia, where Clauss re-formed his partnership with George Daub, an arrangement that lasted for two years. Clauss then joined the firm of Gilboy & O'Malley, which later morphed into Gilboy, Bellante & Clauss, then into Bellante & Clauss, and then into Bellante, Clauss, Miller & Nolan, a firm with an international clientele. In 1956, Clauss opened an office under his own name in Trenton, New Jersey, which later became Clauss & Nolan. His wife was a participating architect in this latter venture.

Clauss joined the American Institute of Architects in 1946. In the early 1950s, he was briefly an associate professor of architecture at the Yale School of Architecture.

In 1960, a design he collaborated on with Oskar Stonorov won the first competition for a memorial to Franklin Roosevelt; intended for Washington, D.C., it was never built.

Clauss died in Swarthmore, Pennsylvania, of a heart attack in 1998.

== Partial list of buildings ==
- Little Switzerland development (Tennessee, 1941; with Jane West Clauss)
- St. Joseph's University — master plan and numerous buildings (Philadelphia)
- University of Scranton — master plan and numerous buildings (Pennsylvania)
- University of Pennsylvania — graduate student housing
- Riverview Home for the Indigent and Aged — addition (Philadelphia, 1953; with Jane West Clauss)
- Children's Reception Center (Philadelphia)
- Philadelphia House of Detention
- Federal Courthouse complex — in collaboration with two other firms and Jane West Clauss (Philadelphia)
- National Park Service — several visitor centers
- Gas stations for Standard Oil in Cleveland
- New Jersey Department of Health and Agriculture (Trenton, 1963 Jane West Claus)
