= Dalgarno v Hannah =

First case decided by the High Court of Australia

- Court: High Court of Australia
- Argued: 6 & 10 November 1903
- Decided: 11 November 1903
- Citations: [1903] HCA 1, (1903) 1 CLR 1

Case history
- Prior actions: Hannah v Dalgarno [1903] NSWStRp 80; (1903) 3 SR (NSW) 494

Court membership
- Judges sitting: Griffith CJ, Barton & O'Connor JJ

Case opinions
- (3:0) The case was not of sufficient significance to grant special leave to appeal. per curiam

Dalgarno v Hannah was the first case to be decided by the High Court of Australia. It involved the significant questions of precisely when the High Court came into existence, for determining its jurisdiction, and the rules applicable to a grant of special leave to appeal. The Court chose not to address the question of when it came into existence and its jurisdiction; instead, withdrawing the grant of leave to appeal on the grounds that leave should be granted only in cases involving a matter of public importance or a significant amount of money (defined in 1901 as GBP 300).

== Background ==
On 9 August 1901, Robert Hannah was injured while driving a hansom cab along Elizabeth Street, Sydney, Australia. A telephone wire that was being repaired overhead fell onto electric tram wires and then contacted the cab, resulting in Hannah's injury. The cab was also damaged, and the horse was electrocuted.

Hannah brought an action for negligence in the Supreme Court of New South Wales against the Commonwealth, who were represented by a nominal defendant, the Deputy Postmaster-General of New South Wales James Dalgarno. Hannah succeeded at trial and was awarded GBP 200 in damages. Dalgarno appealed to a Full Court of the Supreme Court, but the appeal was rejected on 20 August 1903, five days before the Judiciary Act 1903 (which established the High Court) was given royal assent.

On 15 October 1903 Dalgarno was granted special leave to appeal to the High Court. The case was heard in early November.

== Arguments ==
The main issue in the case was whether the High Court had the jurisdiction to hear the appeal. Hannah argued that since the original judgement was given before the Judiciary Act 1903 came into force, the court could not hear the appeal. Dalgarno argued that the right of appeal was not created by the Judiciary Act, but by the Constitution of Australia, which provided that "the judicial power of the Commonwealth shall be vested in a Federal Supreme Court, to be called the High Court of Australia" (section 71). Thus, Dalgarno argued that the High Court actually came into existence on 1 January 1901, when the Constitution came into effect.

Hannah also argued that even if the High Court had the appropriate jurisdiction, the nature of the case did not merit the granting of special leave to appeal.

Section 73 of the Constitution provides that the High Court can hear appeals from any federal court or State supreme court subject to certain exceptions and regulations made by the Parliament. The court pointed out that acts of Parliament could therefore only modify the exercise of rights to appeal (in terms of procedures and costs, for example), and not create new rights of appeal. In this way, the right to appeal had existed since the Constitution came into effect but could not be exercised until the Judiciary Act came into effect.

However, the court also raised the possibility that sections 71 and 73 of the Constitution were "words of futurity", and described illusory rights, because the Court did not physically exist in 1901. They also noted a privy council case decided earlier in 1903, Walker v Walker, in which the court said that a successful litigant is entitled to know when the litigation has come to an end.

== Decision ==
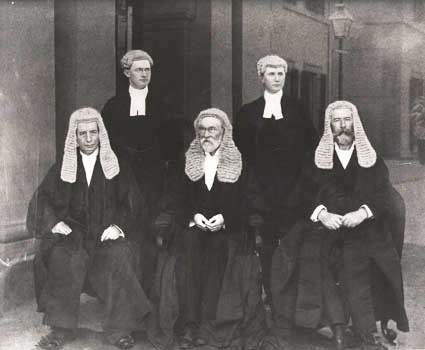
The High Court who heard the case. Photo taken at the first sitting of the court on 6 October 1903 shows Barton, Griffith & O'Connor seated, with court officials in the background.

The Court decided that although it had certainly been brought into literal existence by the Judiciary Act, it potentially derived its authority from the Constitution. However, it chose not to resolve the question. Instead, the Court overturned the grant of leave to appeal on the grounds that leave should be granted only in cases involving a matter of public importance or a significant amount of money (defined in 1901 as GBP 300).

== Consequences ==
The important question of precisely when the High Court came into existence, and from where it derives its authority, has still not been resolved. When introducing the Judiciary Act into Parliament, Alfred Deakin spoke of the strong need for a court capable both of judicial review of government and of interpreting the Constitution. In modern times also, it is widely accepted that the High Court draws its authority from the Constitution (in the vein of the Supreme Court of the United States in Marbury v. Madison).

However, the High Court celebrated its centenary in 2003, one hundred years after the Judiciary Act established the first bench. The formal question of when the High Court came into existence remains unresolved although, in any case, it is largely an academic question. It is unlikely that the issue will ever again be considered by the High Court.
