= Claus Clausen =

Claus Clausen may refer to:

- Claus Kristian Randolph Clausen (1869–1958), U.S. Navy officer in Spanish–American War
- Claus Lauritz Clausen (1820–1892), pioneer Lutheran minister, military chaplain and politician
- Claus Clausen (actor) (1899–1989), German actor
