= Jane West Clauss =

American architect (1907-2003)

Jane West Clauss (September 23, 1907 – January 12, 2003) was an American architect and educator who collaborated on one of the earliest International Style housing developments in the United States.

== Biography ==
Jane Beech West was born in Minneapolis, Minnesota, in 1907. Both her father, historian Willis Mason West, and her mother, Elizabeth Sophia (Beech) West, were professors at the University of Minnesota. She attended the University of Minnesota, receiving her B.A. in interior architecture in 1929. She went on to work for about two years in the Paris atelier of Le Corbusier, the first American woman to do so. During her time with Le Corbusier, she worked on the design of his Swiss Dormitory for the City University of Paris.

She married the German architect Alfred Clauss in 1934, and between 1934 and 1945, they lived in Tennessee, where they collaborated on the design of the prewar "Little Switzerland" suburb of split-level houses outside Knoxville, Tennessee. Sponsored by the Tennessee Valley Authority as part of President Franklin Roosevelt's New Deal, it is regarded as one of the earliest examples of the International Style in the United States. Laid out along a ridge of Brown's Mountain six miles southeast of downtown Knoxville, Little Switzerland consists of twenty 120 x 240–foot lots, on which 10 houses were designed by Jane and Alfred.

In 1945, Clauss and her husband settled in Philadelphia, where she took up a position teaching interior architecture at Beaver College (1946-1967). During this period, she was a participating associate in Clauss & Nolan, a firm founded by her husband. Among the Philadelphia buildings she collaborated on with Alfred are the Federal Courthouse Complex next to Independence Hall and the Riverview Home for the Aged.

Clauss became a member of the American Institute of Architects in 1964.

On the death of her husband in 1998, Clauss moved to Madison, Wisconsin, where she died in early 2003.

== Partial list of buildings ==
- Little Switzerland development (Tennessee, 1941; with Alfred Clauss)
- Riverview Home for the Indigent and Aged — addition (Philadelphia, 1953; with Alfred Clauss)
- Federal Courthouse complex — in collaboration with two other firms and Alfred Clauss (Philadelphia)
