= Claus Jacob =

German scientist and politician (born 1969)

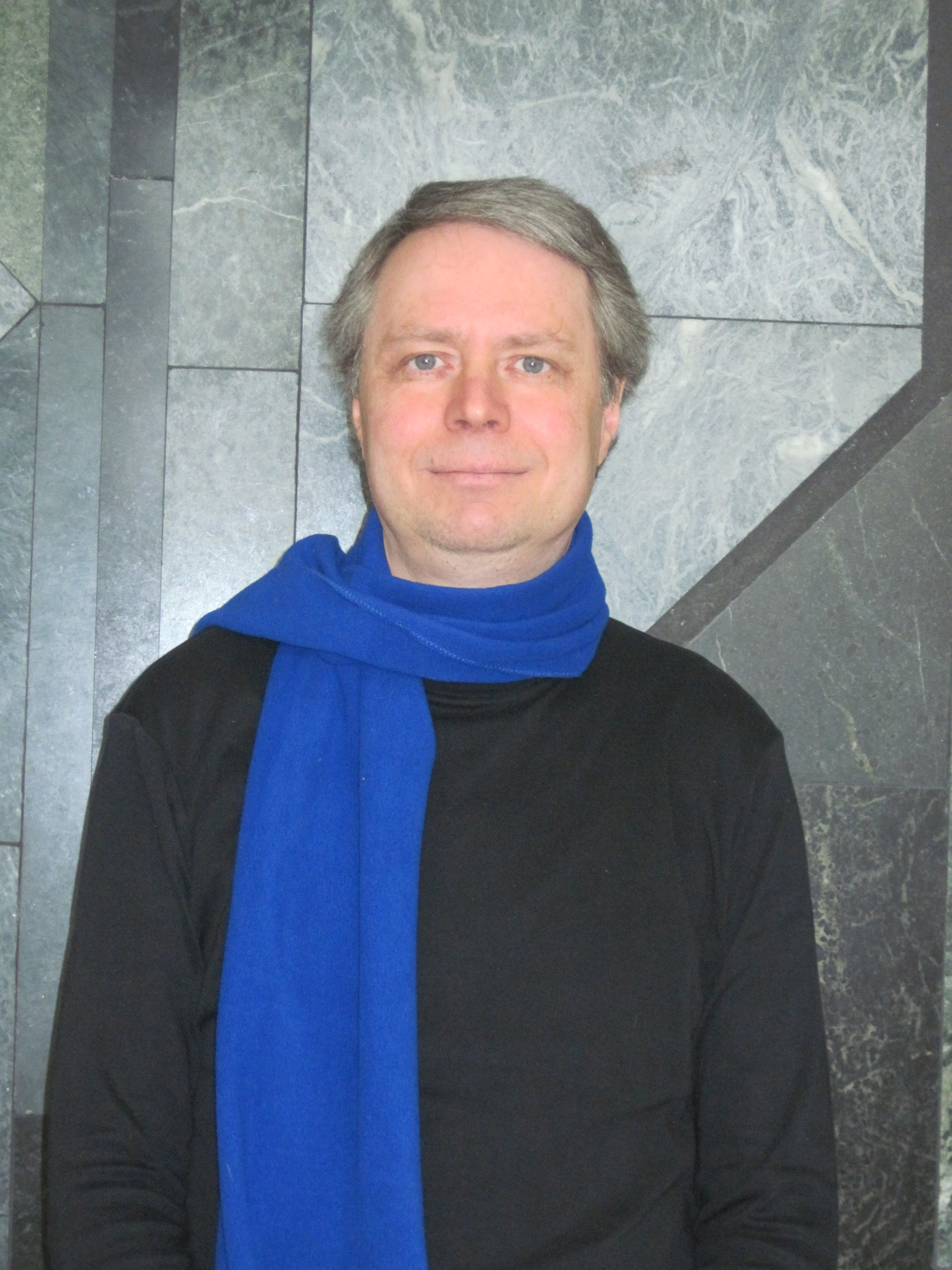
- Born: 19 November 1969 (age 55); Homburg, Saarland, Germany
- Occupation(s): Head of Bioorganic Chemistry, School of Pharmacy, Saarland University
- Children: One boy and one girl

Dr. Claus Jacob B.Sc. M.A. D.Phil. (Oxon) FRSC CChem (born 19 November 1969) is a German scientist and politician functioning as the Head of Bioorganic Chemistry, School of Pharmacy, Saarland University and a member of the Ecological Democratic Party (ÖDP) and represents the Family Party of Germany in the Orstrat Hassel / Saar. He is currently a candidate to the Bundestag on behalf of ÖDP, Homburg constituency. Jacob is known to many of his students as Professor Claus rather than Professor Jacob. This is due to cultural reasons stemming from the rich international environment of his research team and Global collaborations. He received his B.Sc.(Hons) 1st class in Chemistry in 1993 from the University of Leicester, England and his D.Phil. (Oxon) from the University of Oxford in 1997. Jacob had interests in education, psychology, history and philosophy and was awarded a Magister Artium from the University of Hagen in 1998. He is an expert in a variety of topics ranging from organic synthesis, bioorganic chemistry, catalytic sensor/effector agents, intracellular diagnostics, nanotechnology, natural products, reactive sulfur and selenium species, and redox regulation via the cellular thiolstat. He has contributed more than 200 publications to the previously mentioned fields.

== Academic appointments ==
- Fellowship (FRSC) The Royal Society of Chemistry (UK) 2018-
- Full Professor Saarland University (Germany) 2011-
- Junior Professor Saarland University (Germany) 2005-2011
- Visiting Professor Université de Metz (France) 2004, 2005
- Senior Lecturer University of Exeter (UK) 2004-2005
- Lecturer University of Exeter (UK) 1999-2004
- Visiting Scientist Heinrich Heine University Düsseldorf (Germany) 1999
- BASF Research Fellow German Merit Foundation, at Harvard Medical School 1998-1999
- Feodor Lynen Fellow Humboldt Foundation fellowship at Harvard University 1997-1998
- Research Fellow Harvard Medical School (USA) 1996-1999

== Scientific, Philosophical and/or political views ==
Prof. Dr. Jacob main scientific contributions are Reactive Sulfur Species (2002), the Sensor / Effector catalysts in drug design (around 2006), the Cellular Thiolstat (2011) and the Intracellular Diagnostics (around 2012). Jacob is also interested in philosophy of science. He has many contribution in ethics, sociology and history of science. He is a member of the International Society of Philosophy of Chemistry. Prof. Jacob represents the Family Party of Germany in the Orstrat Hassel / Saar (Landesverband Saarland). He is an advocate of up-cycling, green chemistry and against animal testing in basic science. In 2019, he became the State Treasurer (Landesschatzmeister), in St. Ingbert representing the Ecological Democratic Party (ÖDP).

== See also ==
- Bert L. Vallee
