= Jodie Ingles =

Australian cardiac researcher and professor

Jodie Ingles is an Australian cardiac researcher and genetic counsellor. She is director of the Genomics of Inherited Disease Program and Head of the Clinical Genomics Lab at the Garvan Institute of Medical Research in Sydney, Australia. Ingles is also a Conjoint Senior Lecturer at the University of Sydney Faculty of Medicine and Health. She works as a genetic counsellor at the Department of Cardiology, Royal Prince Alfred Hospital.

== Career ==
Ingles is trained as a cardiac genetic counsellor working with families with inherited heart disease. In 2016, Ingles led a survey study which outlined the need for better psychological support for families affected by sudden cardiac death due to a genetic heart disease. This study identified a significant risk for post-traumatic stress and prolonged grief for family members after the sudden cardiac death of a young relative.

Ingles's work in 2018 highlighted an increase in ICD insertion in a study that looked into whether this was caused by increased awareness of risk factors for sudden death, and highlighted an unexpectedly high rate of ICD removals.

Ingles is also an advocate and role model for women in science who speaks about her career and also other roles in society, mother and wife, at events and workshops.

== Education ==
Ingles completed her PhD at the University of Sydney in 2011, titled Specialised genetic heart disease clinics : clinical, genetic, psychosocial and health economic aspects of family management.

She completed the Franklin Women Inclusive Leadership Mentoring Program in 2018 where she developed skills in mentoring and inclusive leadership.

== Awards and grants ==
- 2017 Cardiovascular Research Network (CVRN) Rising Star Ministerial Award
- Clinical Trials and Cohort Studies Grant in excess of $2m from the National Health and Medical Research Council (NHMRC)
- 2019 Award for top-ranked Career Development Fellowship (clinical) application from the National Health and Medical Research Council (NHMRC)
- 2022 Future Leader Fellowship from the Heart Foundation to study to genomics of inherited cardiovascular diseases
- Shirley E Freeman Innovation Award - National Heart Foundation (top-ranked female Fellowship)
- 2024 Medical Research Future Fund Grant in excess of $5m to study sudden cardiac arrest in young people
