= John Shine =

Australian biochemist and molecular biologist

John Shine AC FRS FAA
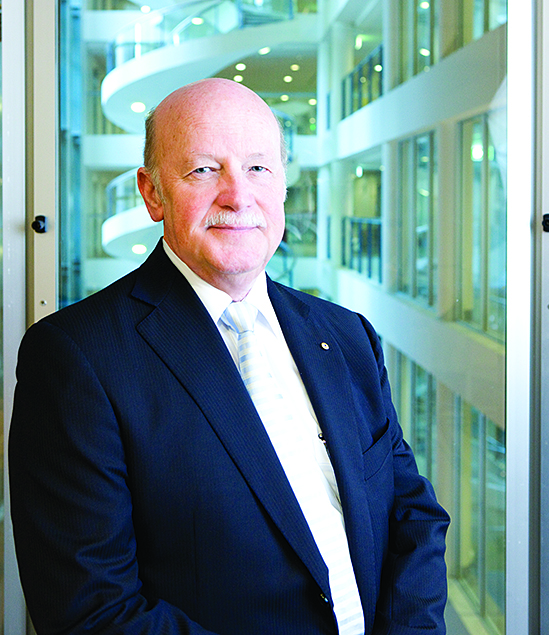
- Shine, pictured at the Garvan Institute of Medical Research in 2010.
- Born: 3 July 1946 (age 80); Brisbane, Queensland
- Education: Australian National University; University of California, San Francisco
- Known for: Shine–Dalgarno sequence
- Scientific career
- Fields: Biochemistry; Molecular biology
- Workplaces: Garvan Institute of Medical Research; UNSW Australia

John Shine AC FRS FAA (born 3 July 1946) is an Australian biochemist and molecular biologist. Shine and Lynn Dalgarno discovered a nucleotide sequence, called the Shine–Dalgarno sequence, necessary for the initiation of protein synthesis. He directed the Garvan Institute of Medical Research in Sydney from 1990 to 2011. From 2018 to 2022, Shine was President of the Australian Academy of Science.

== Background and early career ==
The brother of scientist Richard Shine, John Shine was born in Brisbane in 1946 and completed his university studies at the Australian National University (ANU) in Canberra, graduating with a bachelor of science with honours in 1972 and completing his PhD in 1975. During the course of his studies he and his supervisor, Lynn Dalgarno, discovered the RNA sequence necessary for ribosome binding and the initiation of protein synthesis in the bacterium Escherichia coli. The sequence was named the Shine–Dalgarno sequence. This was a key discovery allowing further development of molecular biology, especially genetic engineering, and was an important discovery towards understanding gene expression and regulation.

Shine undertook post doctoral research at the Department of Biochemistry and Biophysics at the University of California, San Francisco (UCSF). During this period he became the first person to clone a human hormone gene and was central to the cloning of the insulin and growth hormone genes. He also determined the first sequence responsible for replication of a cancer-causing virus.

Returning to Australia and ANU in 1978, he cloned the human renin and endorphin genes, going on to show that human hormones expressed in bacteria can maintain their biological activity. He also founded the Centre for Recombinant DNA Research at ANU. In 1982 he was awarded that Gottschalk Medal by the Australian Academy of Science.

Shine returned to USCSF in 1984, and worked as a vice-president at California Biotechnology Inc. from 1984 to 1986; he was a board member from 1987 to 1989. He was instrumental in the development and growth of the company, which was subsequently sold to Johnson and Johnson.

Shine returned to Australia once more in 1987 to take up a professorship in molecular biology at the University of New South Wales. He also became the deputy director of the Garvan Institute, and subsequently executive director from 1990 to 2011. He was chairman of the National Health and Medical Research Council from 2003 to 2006. As of September 2016, he was a professor of medicine and molecular biology at the Garvan Institute. He was chairman of CSL Limited from 2011 to 2018 and of the Museum of Applied Arts and Science from 2011 to 2016.

== Awards ==
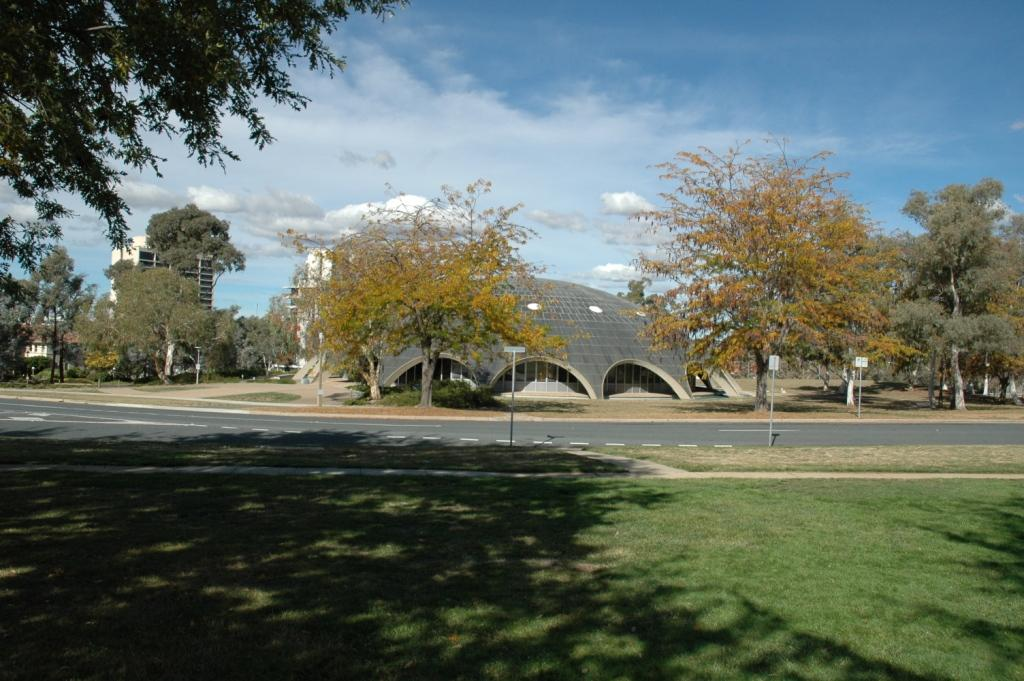
The Shine Dome of the Australian Academy of Science in Canberra.

In 1994 Shine was elected a Fellow of the Australian Academy of Science. He donated A$1 million to the academy in 2000 to help fund the restoration of the building, which was subsequently renamed the Shine Dome in his honour.

Shine was appointed an Officer of the Order of Australia in 1996 for service to medical research, particularly in the field of molecular biology. In 2001 he was awarded a Centenary Medal "For service to Australian society and science in molecular genetics". In 2010, Shine was awarded the Prime Minister's Prize for Science, the nation's highest scientific award. In 2017 he was appointed a Companion of the Order of Australia.

In 2020 he was elected a Fellow of the Royal Society.
