= Marilyn Kozak =

Professor of Biochemistry

Marilyn S. Kozak
- Born: July 8, 1943 (age 83); Akron, Ohio, US
- Education: Johns Hopkins University
- Known for: Kozak consensus sequence
- Scientific career
- Fields: Microbiology
- Workplaces: Robert Wood Johnson Medical School
- Doctoral advisor: Daniel Nathans
- Other academic advisors: Aaron Shatkin

Marilyn S. Kozak is an American professor of biochemistry at the Robert Wood Johnson Medical School. She was previously at the University of Medicine and Dentistry of New Jersey before the school was merged. She was awarded a PhD in microbiology by Johns Hopkins University studying the synthesis of the Bacteriophage MS2, advised by Daniel Nathans.

Kozak sought to study the mechanism of eukaryotic translation initiation, a problem long thought to have already been solved by Joan Steitz. While in the Department of Biological Sciences at University of Pittsburgh, she published a series of studies that established the scanning model of translation initiation and the Kozak consensus sequence. Her last publication was in 2008.

== Recognition ==
Kozak was listed as one of the top 10 Women Scientists of the 1980s in an article published by The Scientist magazine, based on the number of citations for their published work between 1981 and 1988. During this time, Kozak had 3,107 citations. Her most cited work was from 1984, entitled "Compilation and analysis of sequences upstream from the translational start site in eukaryotic mRNAs". This paper highlighted the research that brought the known cellular mRNAs from 32 to 166.

== Controversy ==
In March 2001, Kozak published a mini-review in the Journal of Molecular and Cellular Biology entitled "New Ways of Initiating Translation in Eukaryotes?" that resulted in push-back from the scientific community. In her publication, Kozak discussed her hesitation towards the role of cellular internal ribosome entry sites (IRES). This was most heavily refuted by Robert Schneider, who published a response article of the same name in the same journal in December 2001. In this response, Schneider claimed that in publishing her mini-review, Kozak hoped to increase the validity of her own findings. He further stated that Kozak's publication was not up to scholarly standards and should not have been accepted into the Journal of Molecular and Cellular Biology. The existence of cellular IRESes remains controversial.

== Contributions ==
Along with her published work, Kozak has contributed to the scientific community with her role on the editorial board for the Journal of Molecular and Cellular Biology. She has been listed intermittently as an editor between the years 1983 and 1991.

== Selected works ==
This is a selection of Kozak's work but not a complete list.

- Kozak, M (October 1987). "An analysis of 5'-noncoding sequences from 699 vertebrate messenger RNAs". Nucleic Acids Res. 15 (20): 8125–48. doi:10.1093/nar/15.20.8125. PMC 306349. PMID 3313277.
- Kozak, M (November 1991). "An analysis of vertebrate mRNA sequences: intimations of translational control". J. Cell Biol. 115 (4): 887–903. doi:10.1083/jcb.115.4.887. PMC 2289952. PMID 1955461.
- Kozak, M (1986). "Influences of mRNA secondary structure on initiation by eukaryotic ribosomes". Proc Natl Acad Sci U S A. 83 (9): 2850–4. Bibcode:1986PNAS...83.2850K. doi:10.1073/pnas.83.9.2850. PMC 323404. PMID 3458245.
- Kozak, M. (1989). "The scanning model for translation: an update". The Journal of Cell Biology. 108 (2): 229–241. doi:10.1083/jcb.108.2.229. PMC 2115416. PMID 2645293..
- Kozak, M (1987). "At least six nucleotides preceding the AUG initiator codon enhance translation in mammalian cells". J Mol Biol. 196 (4): 947–50. doi:10.1016/0022-2836(87)90418-9. PMID 3681984.
- Kozak, M (January 1986). "Point mutations define a sequence flanking the AUG initiator codon that modulates translation by eukaryotic ribosomes". Cell. 44 (2): 283–92. doi:10.1016/0092-8674(86)90762-2. PMID 3943125. S2CID 15613863.
- Kozak, M (1981). "Possible role of flanking nucleotides in recognition of the AUG initiator codon by eukaryotic ribosomes". Nucleic Acids Res. 9 (20): 5233–52. doi:10.1093/nar/9.20.5233. PMC 327517. PMID 7301588.
- Kozak, M (2008). "Faulty old ideas about translational regulation paved the way for current confusion about how microRNAs function". Gene. 423 (2): 108–15. doi:10.1016/j.gene.2008.07.013. PMID 18692553.
