= Shine–Dalgarno sequence =

Ribosomal binding site in prokaryotic messenger RNA

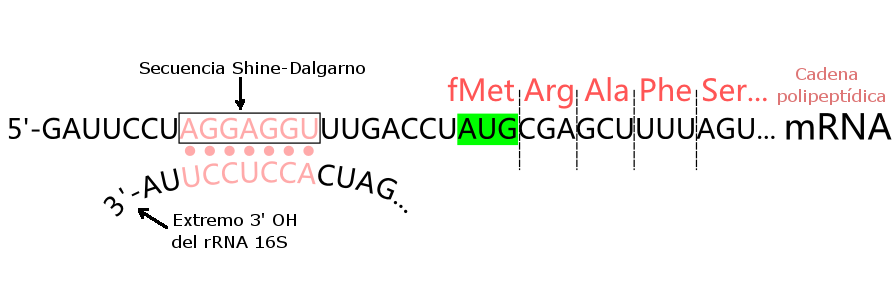
Shine-Dalgarno sequence (labels in Spanish)

The Shine–Dalgarno (SD) sequence is, sometimes partially, part of a ribosomal binding site in bacterial and archaeal messenger RNA. It is generally located around 8 bases upstream of the start codon AUG. The RNA sequence helps recruit the ribosome to the messenger RNA (mRNA) to initiate protein synthesis by aligning the ribosome with the start codon. Once recruited, tRNA may add amino acids in sequence as dictated by the codons, moving downstream from the translational start site.

The Shine–Dalgarno sequence is common in bacteria, but rarer in archaea. It is also present in some chloroplast and mitochondrial transcripts. The six-base consensus sequence is AGGAGG; in Escherichia coli, for example, the sequence is AGGAGGU, while the shorter GAGG dominates in E. coli virus T4 early genes.

The Shine–Dalgarno sequence was proposed by Australian scientists John Shine and Lynn Dalgarno in 1973.

== Recognition ==
=== Translation start sites ===
Using a method developed by Hunt, Shine and Dalgarno showed that the nucleotide tract at the 3' end of E. coli 16S ribosomal RNA (rRNA) (that is, the end where translation begins) is pyrimidine-rich and has the specific sequence 5'-YACCUCCUUA-3'. They proposed that these ribosomal nucleotides recognize the complementary purine-rich sequence 5'-AGGAGGU-3', which is found upstream of the start codon AUG in a number of mRNAs found in viruses that affect E. coli. Many studies have confirmed that base pairing between the Shine–Dalgarno sequence in mRNA and the 3' end of 16S rRNA is of prime importance for initiation of translation by bacterial ribosomes.

Given the complementary relationship between rRNA and the Shine–Dalgarno sequence in mRNA, it was proposed that the sequence at the 3'-end of the rRNA determines the capacity of the prokaryotic ribosome to translate a particular gene in an mRNA. Base pairing between the 3'-end of the rRNA and the Shine–Dalgarno sequence in mRNA is a mechanism by which the cell can distinguish between initiator AUGs and internal and/or out-of-frame AUG sequences. The degree of base pairing also plays a role in determining the rate of initiation at different AUG initiator codons.

=== Translation termination ===
In 1973 Dalgarno and Shine proposed that in eukaryotes, the 3'-end of the small 18S rRNA may play a role in the termination of protein synthesis by complementary base pairing with termination codons. This came from their observation that the 3' terminal sequences of 18S rRNA from Drosophila melanogaster, Saccharomyces cerevisiae, and rabbit cells are identical: GAUCAUUA -3'OH. The conservation of this sequence between such distantly related eukaryotes implied that this nucleotide tract played an important role in the cell. Since this conserved sequence contained the complement of each of the three eukaryotic termination codons (UAA, UAG and UGA) it was proposed to have a role in the termination of protein synthesis in eukaryotes. A similar role for the 3' end of 16S rRNA in recognising termination triplets in E.coli was proposed in 1974 by Shine and Dalgarno on the basis of complementarity relationships between the 3'-terminal UUA-OH in 16S rRNA and E.coli termination codons. In F1 phage, a class of viruses that infect bacteria, the sequence coding for the first few amino acids often contains termination triplets in the two unused reading frames. In a commentary on this paper, it was noted that complementary base pairing with the 3'-terminus of 16S rRNA might serve to abort peptide bond formation after out-of-phase initiation.

== Sequence and protein expression ==
Mutations in the Shine–Dalgarno sequence can reduce or increase translation in prokaryotes. This change is due to a reduced or increased mRNA-ribosome pairing efficiency, as evidenced by the fact that compensatory mutations in the 3'-terminal 16S rRNA sequence can restore translation.

== See also ==
- Kozak consensus sequence, the sequence that targets the ribosome to the initiation codon in Eukaryotes.
- Bacterial translation
- Archaeal translation
