= 2012 Queen's Birthday Honours (Australia) =

Australian awards list

The Queen's Birthday Honours 2012 for Australia were announced on 11 June 2012.

† indicates an award given posthumously.

== Order of Australia ==
=== Companion (AC) ===
==== General Division ====
Recipient	Citation
The Honourable Peter Douglas Beattie	For eminent service to the Parliament and community of Queensland, through initiatives in the area of education and training, economic development, particularly in biotechnology, information technology and aviation industries, and to the promotion of international trade.
Professor the Honourable Gareth John Evans AO QC	For eminent service to international relations, particularly in the Asia Pacific Region as an adviser to governments on a range of global policy matters, to conflict prevention and resolution, and to arms control and disarmament.
Professor Ian Hector Frazer	For eminent service to medical research, particularly through leadership roles in the discovery of the Human Papilloma Virus vaccine and its role in preventing cervical cancer, to higher education and as a supporter of charitable organisations.
The Honourable Robert Murray Hill	For eminent service to the Parliament of Australia, particularly through the development of policy reform in the portfolios of the environment and defence, and to Australia's international relations through senior diplomatic representation to the United Nations.
Professor Stephen Donald Hopper	For eminent service as a global science leader in the field of plant conservation biology, particularly in the delivery of world class research programs contributing to the conservation of endangered species and ecosystems.
The Honourable Joan Elizabeth Kirner AM	For eminent service to the Parliament of Victoria and to the community through conservation initiatives, contributions to gender equality, the development of education and training programs and the pursuit of civil rights and social inclusion.
The Honourable Chief Justice Wayne Stewart Martin	For eminent service to the judiciary and to the law, particularly as Chief Justice of the Supreme Court of Western Australia, to legal reform and education, and to the community.
Professor Peter Singer	For eminent service to philosophy and bioethics as a leader of public debate and communicator of ideas in the areas of global poverty, animal welfare and the human condition.

=== Officer (AO) ===
==== General Division ====
Recipient	Citation
Emeritus Professor Mary Darvall Barton	For distinguished service to veterinary science and public health as a researcher and diagnostic microbiologist, and to education through academic and administrative roles at the University of South Australia.
Professor David St Clair Black	For distinguished service to science in the area of organic and heterocyclic chemistry, through leadership roles within professional organisations, and as an educator and mentor.
Barbara Patterson Blackman	For distinguished service to the arts and to the community, as a supporter of artistic performance, through philanthropic contributions, and as an advocate for people who are blind and partially sighted.
Jennifer May Bott	For distinguished service to the arts through executive and leadership roles in national cultural organisations, and to the development of policy reform initiatives promoting funding and best practice.
Ian Brusasco AM	For distinguished service to the community of Queensland through leadership roles with a range of public administration, sporting and charitable organisations, particularly Foodbank Queensland.
Dr William Henry Butler CBE	For distinguished service to the community through the promotion of public understanding of natural history and wildlife conservation, to the development of collaborative environmental partnerships with industry, and to the community.
Dr Thomas Edwin Calma	For distinguished service to the Indigenous community as an advocate for human rights and social justice, through contributions to government policy and reform, and to cross cultural understanding.
Robert Graham Cameron	For distinguished service to the mining industry in New South Wales, through leadership roles with professional organisations, to higher education, and to the community of the Hunter Valley.
Peter Philip Carey	For distinguished service to literature as a novelist, through international promotion of the Australian identity, as a teacher, and as a mentor to emerging writers.
Robin Hamilton Chambers	For distinguished service to Australia-China relations, particularly through the promotion of trade and investment relationships in the minerals and metals sector, and as an adviser on international corporation law.
Paul Clarkson	For distinguished service to the creative arts through leadership and administration roles of cultural organisations and events, to arts policy development, to education, and to the community of the City of Port Phillip.
Mary Lynn Crooks	For distinguished service to the community through contributions to public policy, particularly in the areas of social cohesion and water sustainability, and as an advocate for the advancement of women.
Dr Owen Thomas Denmead	For distinguished service to environmental research in the fields of crop and soil sciences, physical ecology and micrometeorology, and through the development of improved agricultural practices.
Professor Geoffrey Alan Donnan	For distinguished service to neurology as a clinician and academic leader, and through international contributions to research, particularly in the prevention and treatment of stroke.
Jeremy Kitson Ellis	For distinguished service to business and commerce, particularly as a contributor to the development of the mining industry, to the environment through leadership and advisory roles, to higher education, and to philanthropy.
Richard Falkinger	For distinguished service to heritage architecture, particularly the restoration and conservation of ecclesiastical structures, to philanthropy, and through support for young architects.
Dr Anne Therese Gallagher	For distinguished service to the law, and to human rights, as a practitioner, teacher and scholar, particularly in the areas of human trafficking responses and criminal justice.
Dr Judith Teng Wah Goh	For distinguished service to gynaecological medicine, particularly in the field of fistula surgery, and to the promotion of the rights of women and children in developing countries.
Dr Michael Halmagyi	For distinguished service to neurology as a clinician and educator, and through contributions to research into the diagnosis and treatment of disorders of the nervous system.
Professor Elizabeth Jane Harman	For distinguished service to tertiary education administration, to the development of vocationally oriented and professional development courses, through governance reforms, and to the community.
Rolf Harris AM OBE	For distinguished service to the performing and visual arts, to charitable organisations, and to international relations through the promotion of Australian culture.
Stuart Beaumont Hart ISO	For distinguished service to the community of South Australia through leadership roles in public administration, particularly urban and regional planning, to policy reform, and to the development of conservation initiatives.
Associate Professor Ross Roger Haslam	For distinguished service to medicine, particularly as a leader in the specialities of perinatology and neonatology, to professional development, and to medical research and education.
The Honourable David Peter Hawker	For distinguished service to the Parliament of Australia, to public administration and monetary policy reform, and to the community through local government, health and sporting organisations.
The Honourable Dr John Joseph Herron	For distinguished service to the Parliament of Australia, to international relations through diplomatic and humanitarian roles, to professional medical associations, and to the community.
Professor Graeme John Hugo	For distinguished service to population research, particularly the study of international migration, population geography and mobility, and through leadership roles with national and international organisations.
Professor Douglas Samuel Jones AM RFD	For distinguished service to the law as a leader in the areas of arbitration and alternative dispute resolution, to policy reform, and to national and international professional organisations.
Elizabeth May Jones	For distinguished service to the performing arts as an artistic director, administrator and performer, to the promotion of Indigenous playwrights and actors, and to the community.
Piers Lane	For distinguished service to the performing arts as an internationally renowned classical pianist, to professional and cultural organisations, and to the development of emerging musicians.
Dr Robert Bruce Lee	For distinguished service to the aviation industry, to the development of air safety and accident investigation standards, and to national and international professional associations.
Russell John Lee	For distinguished service to the international community through the development of humanitarian aid programs, particularly as Founder of Operation Open Heart, and to professional nursing organisations.
Dr Deborah Lehmann	For distinguished service to medical research in the field of epidemiology, particularly the prevention of pneumococcal infection, to Indigenous health, and to professional organisations.
Susan Carolyn Lloyd-Williams	For distinguished service to the thoroughbred horseracing industry through the development of marketing strategies and initiatives, to the promotion of women, and to the community.
Simon Vincent McKeon	For distinguished service to business and commerce through leadership and advisory roles, and to the community as a supporter of national and international charitable, educational and sporting organisations.
Professor Anthony Kinnaird Milne	For distinguished service to science and engineering as a contributor to international research programs, particularly in the fields of radar remote sensing, vegetation assessment and wetlands mapping, and to education.
Adjunct Professor Simon Richard Molesworth AM QC	For distinguished service to conservation and the environment, to heritage preservation at national and international levels, to the professions and natural resource sectors, and to community health organisations.
Graeme Lloyd Murphy AM	For distinguished service to the performing arts, both nationally and internationally, particularly ballet and contemporary dance, as a choreographer and director, and to the enhancement of Australia's cultural environment.
Daphne Mary Pirie MBE	For distinguished service to sports administration and to hockey, particularly through roles with the Queensland Academy of Sport, as an advocate for the participation of women and girls in sport, and to the community of the Gold Coast region.
Professor John Edward Rasko	For distinguished service to biomedical research in the field of gene and cell therapy, as a clinician, author and administrator, through executive roles with professional organisations, and to philanthropy.
Shelley Reys	For distinguished service to the Indigenous community, to reconciliation and social inclusion, and as an advocate for improved educational, health and employment opportunities for Aboriginal and Torres Strait Islander people.
Professor Nicholas Andrew Saunders	For distinguished service to medicine and to higher education through administration and clinical leadership roles, and as a significant contributor to national academic and professional organisations.
Stephen Thomas Sedgwick	For distinguished service to the community through leadership roles in the administration and implementation of innovative economic and social policy reform, and to public sector ethics and accountability.
Brett Joseph Sheehy	For distinguished service to the performing and visual arts as a director of national festivals, to international artistic exchange, and through mentoring roles.
Anthony Francis Shepherd	For distinguished service to business, particularly the infrastructure development sector through innovative joint venture partnerships, and to the arts and sporting organisations.
Dr Richard Miln Smith	For distinguished service to scientific research in the fields of human nutrition, cardiovascular disease and agriculture, to Indigenous communities in rural and remote areas, and to professional organisations.
Professor Tamarapu Sridhar	For distinguished service to tertiary education, particularly the discipline of chemical engineering, as an academic and administrator, and to the forging of international strategic educational relationships.
The Honourable Professor Christopher David Steytler QC	For distinguished service to the judiciary and to the law, to the advancement and protection of human rights, to legal education, and to professional ethics and standards.
Frank Walden Thompson	For distinguished service to the publishing industry, to the promotion of modern Australian cultural expression, particularly in the area of literary fiction, and through support for emerging authors.
Phillip Toyne	For distinguished service to environmental law through executive and advisory roles, particularly the introduction of a National Landcare Program, to the protection and restoration of Australian landscapes, and to the Indigenous community.
Professor Mathew Alexander Vadas	For distinguished service to medical and biotechnological research, particularly in the area of human immunology, to higher education, and through contributions to professional organisations.
The Honourable Mark Anthony Vaile	For distinguished service to the Parliament of Australia, through support for rural and regional communities, to the pursuit of global trade and investment opportunities, and to the citizens of the Taree region.
Professor Ian Robert Young	For distinguished service to tertiary education through leadership, strategic management, research and academic roles, as an author, and to international education collaboration.
Lesley Frances Young	For distinguished service to women and their families in rural and remote areas through the development of policies relating to social and economic wellbeing, to local government, and to the community of the Latrobe region.

==== Military Division ====
Branch	Recipient	Citation
Navy	Vice Admiral Raymond James Griggs AM CSC	For distinguished service to the Australian Defence Force as Deputy Head Strategic Reform and Governance, Deputy Chief of Joint Operations, and Chief of the Royal Australian Navy.
Navy	Vice Admiral Peter David Jones DSC AM	For distinguished service as Head Information and Communications Technology Operations and Head Capability Systems in the Capability Development Group.

=== Member (AM) ===
==== General Division ====
Recipient	Citation
Anthony Norman Abbott	For service to the law, and to the legal profession, through policy development and reform roles with professional organisations, and to the disability sector through the Multiple Sclerosis Society of South Australia.
Bruce Murdoch Ackerman	For service to the community of the Marysville region through the provision of assistance and support to residents during, and in the aftermath of, the 2009 Victorian bushfires.
Enzo Errol Allara	For service to the community through executive roles with Foodbank Australia, and to the food manufacturing and processing industry.
Thomas Michael Almond	For service to the road transport and logistics industry through development of heavy vehicle safety strategies, and to the community of the Hunter Valley.
Dr Ratomir Antic	For service to thoracic medicine as a clinician, administrator and mentor, and to people affected by asthma.
Robert Johnston Ashby	For service to the merino sheep breeding and wool growing industry, particularly through executive roles with professional organisations.
Ivan Backman	For service to the transport and logistics industry through roles with the Australian Logistics Council, as an advocate and mentor, and to the community.
Dr Stephen Baddeley	For service to orthopaedic medicine in the Northern Territory, to international humanitarian aid, and to St John Ambulance.
Annette Elizabeth Baldwin	For service to nursing as an administrator, through contributions to health care outreach programs in the South Pacific, and to nurse education.
Mina W. Singh Batra	For service to the community as an advocate of gender equality, Indigenous issues, human rights and interfaith relations.
Professor John Robinson Bell	For service to medicine in the field of pathology, to medical education and professional organisations, and to the community.
Margaret Elizabeth Berlemon	For service to youth through executive roles in the Guiding movement at state and national levels, and to the community through young women's organisations.
Associate Professor Wilma Margaret Beswick	For service to medical education and research through training and administrative roles, to curriculum development and clinical assessment reform, and to professional associations.
Brett Biddington	For service to the space sector, particularly through national policy and industry development, science and education support, and through governance of astronomy programs.
Dr Denis George Binnion	For service to adult and community education as a leader in curriculum development, particularly in the areas of integration and access as well as executive roles in professional organisations.
Stuart Alexander Black	For service to the profession of accounting, to ethical practices and standards, as a contributor to professional organisations, and to the community.
Dr David Caryl Blaikie	For service to community health in South Australia through public administration roles, to professional dental organisations, and to local government.
Dr John Rowan Blogg	For service to veterinary science, particularly in the speciality of ophthalmology, and as an author and mentor.
Grahame John Bond	For service to the performing arts as an actor, writer and composer, and as a supporter of aspiring artists.
Terry Ann Bracks	For service to youth, particularly as the Founder of Western Chances, and as a contributor to health, social development and arts organisations in Victoria.
The Honourable Ernest Francis Bridge OAM	For service to the Indigenous community, particularly through support for health management programs, and to the Parliament of Western Australia.
Dr James Broadbent	For service to the preservation of Australia's built heritage through roles with the New South Wales Branch of the National Trust of Australia, and as an academic and researcher.
Dr Patricia May Brodie	For service to midwifery as a clinician, researcher and educator, and to professional associations.
Christine Mary Bundensen	For service to international tertiary education through leadership roles in the field of English Language Teaching, to the development of quality assurance standards, and to professional organisations.
Heather Rose Butler	For service to the community of the east coast of Tasmania, particularly through the tourism and hospitality sectors, to youth, and to the Parliament of Tasmania.
Dr Robert Frank Care	For service to engineering through a range of executive roles, to the business sector, to international humanitarian programs, and to the sport of athletics.
John Albert Carlson	For service to public administration, particularly in the areas of nuclear non-proliferation and disarmament, and to the development of international safeguards policy.
Robert Terrence Carson	For service to the international community through humanitarian roles, particularly in Pakistan, to Rotary, and to the building and construction industry.
Colin Bruce Carter OAM	For service to the Indigenous community through the development of employment and economic opportunities, as a supporter of charitable organisations, and to the sport of Australian Rules football.
Brian David Cassidy PSM	For service to public administration, particularly in the areas of competition policy, trade practices and consumer protection regulation.
Professor Christopher Christophi	For service to medicine as a clinician, to medical education as an academic and researcher, through contributions to professional organisations, and to the Greek community of Victoria.
Dr David Cohen	For service to progressive alternative education, curriculum development and science education, as a researcher and editor, and to the community.
Emeritus Professor Desley William Connell	For service to environmental chemistry and public health, to education as an academic, researcher and author, and as a mentor.
Brett Robin Cottle	For service to the performing arts, particularly to songwriters, composers and publishers, through executive roles with copyright protection organisations, and to the community.
Caroline Anne Crosse	For service to the community through the creation and provision of innovative employment opportunities for people with a mental illness, and to the promotion of social inclusion.
Anthony Michael D'Aloisio	For service to business and commerce, particularly through leadership roles in the securities and investments regulatory sector, to Australia-Asia relations, and to charitable organisations.
Jessica Dames	For service to arts administration in South Australia through the Independent Arts Association, as a supporter of emerging artists and writers, and to the promotion of cultural events.
Frederick Redmond Davidson	For service to business and commerce in the human resources and outplacements industry, and to the community through executive roles with service, health and educational organisations.
Dr James Hector Davidson	For service to literature as an editor and cultural commentator, and to education as an historical researcher and biographer.
William Louis Delaat	For service to the pharmaceutical industry through roles with professional organisations, to the development of medicines policy and reform, and to the community.
Dr Carey John Denholm	For service to higher education as an academic, to psychology, particularly relating to families and adolescents, and to the community.
Philip Raymond Diment	For service to the community as the convenor of the Australian Aids Memorial Quilt Project, and through contributions to the advancement of human rights.
Dr Jeanette Maree Dixon	For service to education through roles in promoting space science, through contributions to the learning of science in schools, and as a teacher.
The Reverend Monsignor Anthony Linsay Doherty	For service to the Catholic Church in Australia, through adult faith education and pastoral care, and to the Parish of Rose Bay.
Margaret Josephine Dowling	For service to children through executive roles with Barnardos Australia.
The Honourable Justice John Alfred Dowsett	For service to the law and to the judiciary, to professional associations, and to legal education in the area of litigation and dispute resolution.
Professor Graham Paul Durant	For service to science education as the Director of Questacon: The National Science and Technology Centre, to the museums sector, and through scientific advisory roles.
Edward David Edwards	For service to science in the field of entomology, particularly moths and butterflies, as an author and researcher, and as a mentor.
The Honourable Graham John Edwards	For service to the Parliaments of Australia and Western Australia, to veterans through advocacy and support roles, and to people with a disability.
Professor Garry James Egger	For service to medical education as an administrator and teacher, particularly in the area of health promotion and research, as an author, and to professional organisations.
Elizabeth Priscilla English	For service to nursing, particularly in the field of stomal therapy clinical practice and education, and through executive roles with national and international associations.
Robert Joseph Favell	For service to music education in Far North Queensland as a conductor, director and teacher, as a mentor of young musicians, and to the Brass Band movement.
Professor Michael Patrick Feneley	For service to medicine in the field of cardiology as a clinician, researcher and educator, through contributions to professional organisations, and to the community.
Emeritus Professor Ian Stewart Ferguson	For service to tertiary education through administrative and teaching roles, to forestry and land management, as a researcher and author, and to the community.
Professor Michael John Field	For service to medical education as an academic and teacher, particularly in the field of nephrology, as a clinician, and through contributions to a range of professional organisations.
Denise Mae Fisher	For service to nursing, particularly in the areas of breastfeeding and lactation management, and to the health and well-being of mothers and children.
Scientia Professor Joseph Paul Forgas	For service to education and research in the discipline of psychology, as an academic and author, and through contributions to international professional associations.
Jane Gladys Fraser	For service to people with a disability as a defender of human rights through a range of government and advocacy organisations.
Lindsay James Fraser	For service to industrial relations in the building and construction industries, to vocational education and training, and to youth.
Dr Michael Graeme Garner	For service to veterinary science, particularly in the field of epidemiology, and through the development and promotion of Australia's animal health.
Dr Alexander Segger George	For service to conservation and the environment as a botanist, historian and author, particularly in the area of Australian flora, and through roles with national and international professional organisations.
Dianne Christine Giblin	For service to public education, particularly through the Federation of Parents' and Citizens' Association of New South Wales, and to the community.
Margaret Ann Gray	For service to education, particularly the provision of English language courses for overseas students and adult migrants, and through advisory and accreditation policy roles.
David Green PSM	For service to the community through leadership roles with social justice organisations, to welfare policy reform, and to the community.
Dr Neville James Green	For service to the community as an historian specialising in native title and Indigenous projects, as an author, and to professional associations.
Trevor John Green	For service to arts administration, particularly through the Melbourne Symphony Orchestra, to Australia's symphonic sector, and as a supporter of young artists and composers.
Dr Graeme Cecil Gunn	For service to architecture, to the promotion of innovative urban design, to professional education, and as a supporter of emerging architects.
Peter Gunn	For service to the transport industry, to the development of innovative freight logistics strategies, and as a supporter of children's health organisations.
Professor Neville Frederick Hacker	For service to medicine in the field of gynaecological oncology as a clinician, researcher and educator, and through contributions to professional organisations on a national and international level.
Frank Allen Hall-Bentick	For service to people with a disability through executive and advocacy roles with a range of organisations, particularly Disability Australia.
Professor John Davis Hamilton	For service to medicine and tertiary education as an academic and administrator, through support for Indigenous students, and to professional associations.
Wayne David Harrison	For service to the arts as a director, writer, producer and performer, to Australian cultural life, and as a supporter of emerging talent.
Professor Barry Thomas Hart	For service to conservation and the environment, particularly in the areas of water quality, aquatic ecology and catchment management, and to education as an academic and researcher.
Dr Keith George Hartman	For service to medicine in the field of obstetrics and gynaecology as a clinician, and through executive and fundraising roles with the Friends of the Mater Foundation.
Professor Alan John Hayes	For service to the social sciences through the Australian Institute of Family Studies, as a contributor to policy research, and as an academic and author.
Professor Colleen Patricia Hayward	For service to tertiary education through administrative and research roles, to the advancement of the rights of Indigenous people, particularly in the areas of social welfare, law and justice and children's health.
Jane Elizabeth Hayward	For service to the community of the Strathewen area, particularly to schoolchildren and their families, in the aftermath of the 2009 Victorian bushfires.
Bettine Garth Heathcote	For service to aged persons through executive and advisory roles with a range of organisations, particularly the Council on the Ageing at state and national levels, and to the community.
Dr Thomas Rex Henderson	For service to rural and remote medicine in Western Australia as a paediatrician and neonatologist, to Indigenous health and welfare, and as a mentor.
Professor Heather Jeannie Herbert	For service to tertiary education, particularly through improvements to educational outcomes for Indigenous people, and to the delivery of learning opportunities across regional and remote northern Australia.
Athol Hodgson	For service to forestry science, particularly the development of land management and bushfire risk reduction strategies, to emergency service organisations, and to the community of rural Victoria.
Brand Hoff	For service to the information communication technology sector, to innovative product development and research, and to the community of the Australian Capital Territory.
Leon Codrington Holmes	For service to the community through leadership roles with the Australian Meals on Wheels Association at state and national levels, to corporate governance and structural reform, and to the community of South Australia.
Dr Nicholas Charles Hope	For service to the international business and finance sector, particularly the economic development of emerging nations, through senior leadership roles with banking and academic institutions.
Anne Dorothy Howe	For service to public administration in South Australia through executive and advisory roles with economic, water, construction and horticultural organisations.
Klaus Hueneke	For service to conservation and the environment as an historian, author and photographer, and to the preservation of Australia's built heritage, particularly in the Snowy Mountains region.
Tony Hyams	For service to the superannuation industry through leadership and executive roles, to the financial services sector, to the Parliament of Victoria, and to the community.
Rodney Myles Hyman	For service to the plant and machinery valuation industry through the Australian Property Institute, to professional organisations, and to the community.
Zigismunds Inge	For service to building and construction, particularly the retirement village industry, as a financial supporter of health, sporting and children's organisations, and to professional associations.
Graham Jack Inns	For service to business and commerce, particularly through the Australian Institute of Management, to local government, and to the community.
Audrey Jackson	For service to education through the activities of the independent schools sector on a state and national level, to vocational learning and training, and as Headmistress of St Mary's Anglican Girls' School.
Professor Robert Siebrand Jansen	For service to medical research and education in Australia and internationally as an academic, particularly in the field of human reproductive genetics and in-vitro fertilisation, and as a clinician and author.
Kenneth Stephen Jasper	For service to the Parliament of Victoria, and to the community of the Murray Valley, through advocacy and support roles for the performing arts, multicultural, transport, health and emergency service organisations.
Christopher Richard Johnson	For service to architecture in the field of urban design and the development of major public projects, to policy implementation and reform, and to professional organisations.
Leigh Frederic Jowett	For service to the community of the Marysville area through the provision of assistance and support to residents during, and in the aftermath of, the 2009 Victorian bushfires.
Jean Maxwell Kelso	For service to the performing arts as a senior soloist, through mentoring roles, as the Founder and Director of the Hope and Harmony Choir, and to the community.
Professor Anne Margaret Keogh	For service to medicine in the field of cardiac transplantation, advanced heart failure and pulmonary hypertension as a clinician and researcher, to professional associations, and to the community in the area of animal welfare.
Dr Glen Ashley Kile	For service to forest science, biosecurity and sustainable forestry through research, leadership and management.
Peter Stannett Kingston	For service to the visual arts as a painter, printmaker and cartoonist, and to the preservation and conservation of the natural environment and historical locations.
Spiros Jeff Konstantinou	For service to business and commerce, particularly in the property construction and management sector, as a supporter of a range of charitable organisations, and to the Greek community of the Australian Capital Territory.
John Adrian Lawler APM	For service to public administration in the area of crime investigation and prevention through executive roles, and to national and international law enforcement.
Gregory Arthur Lewin	For service to the profession of chemical engineering through senior roles in the petroleum industry, to business and commerce, and to professional organisations.
Lancelot Graham Lightfoot	For service to the container shipping industry, to the development and promotion of Australia's international trade networks, as a supporter of the welfare of merchant mariners, and to the community.
The Honourable David Edward Llewellyn	For service to the Parliament of Tasmania, particularly through contributions in the portfolio areas of planning, resources, primary industry, Police and emergency management and health, to the community, and to the Anglican Church in Tasmania.
Neil William Lowrie	For service to the community through executive roles with residential aged care service providers, to the law, and to the Uniting Church in South Australia.
Philip Eric McCarroll	For service to the community through financial support and fundraising activities for a range of charitable, youth, health and educational organisations.
Emeritus Professor Jennifer Anne McComb	For service to plant science, and to education, as an academic, researcher and author, to professional scientific organisations, and to the community.
Dr Garth Alexander McGilvray	For service to veterinary science, particularly through the development of national registration accreditation policy, and as a practitioner.
Professor Joan Merrilyn McMeeken	For service to tertiary education in the discipline of physiotherapy as an academic, researcher and educator, to professional organisations, and to the community.
Professor Gabrielle Lucy McMullen	For service to tertiary education, particularly through the Australian Catholic University, as an administrator and academic leader, to the discipline of science, and to the community.
Emeritus Professor Graham Jon Macdonald	For service to biomedical research in the areas of hypertension and renal disease, to medical education, to the promotion and awareness raising of organ donation, and as a mentor.
Lynnita Mary Maddock PSM	For service to public administration, particularly in the area of Australia's Antarctic operations, to the development of natural resources and environmental protection strategies, and to scientific research.
Barry Charles Marsden AFSM	For service to public administration in Victoria in the fire and emergency services sector, and to the development of innovative firefighting equipment and technologies.
Dr Alfred James Martin	For service to paediatric respiratory medicine as a clinician and researcher, to medical education and administration, as an advocate for Indigenous health care, and to professional associations.
Stuart Lionel Maunder	For service to the performing arts, particularly with Opera Australia, as an artistic director, and as a mentor to emerging artists.
Italo Mazzola	For service to the community through executive roles with residential aged care service providers, to multicultural organisations, and as a supporter of the Catholic Diocese of Wollongong.
Ronald Usher Metcalfe OAM	For service to the community of the Australian Capital Territory region as a community radio presenter, through the promotion of military history, and as a volunteer with national cultural institutions.
James Morrison Millar	For service to business and commerce through executive roles with a range of organisations, and to the community through leadership and fundraising support for social welfare, cancer research and educational associations.
Frances Lillian Milne	For service to the multicultural communities of New South Wales, as a contributor to human rights and social justice for refugees and asylum seekers, and to the Uniting Church in Australia.
Alan Duncan Mortimer	For service to food science and technology, to professional development and networking at the national and international level, to food safety standards, and as a mentor.
Graeme John Morton	For service to the arts, particularly choral music and culture, as a conductor, director, composer and academic, through the performance of new Australian musical works, and to youth.
Dr Pieter Willem Mourik	For service to medicine as an obstetrician and gynaecologist, to the promotion of medical services in rural and remote areas, and to education.
Dr James Sunter Muecke	For service to ophthalmic medicine, to the provision of eye health services and rehabilitation programs for Indigenous and South East Asian communities, and to professional organisations.
Associate Professor Jane Crawford Munro	For service to education at secondary and tertiary levels, particularly for international students, and to the community through a range of leadership and advisory roles.
Dr Ludomyr John Mykyta	For service to geriatric medicine through care of the aged, education of students, and leadership roles with professional and advisory organisations.
Professor Alanna Maree Nobbs	For service to education in the fields of ancient history and the classics as an educator, and through leadership roles in professional organisations, particularly the Society for the Study of Early Christianity.
Dr Janette Rosalind Noble	For service to the community, particularly through contributions to the Hunter Region Botanic Gardens.
Richard Gerald Nott	For service to the banking and insurance industries, and to the community through the Australia-Britain Society.
Emeritus Professor Robert Rupert Officer	For service to business and education in the field of financial economic theory, as a leader of public and private sector institutions, an adviser to government and an academic administrator.
Clinical Professor Trevor Stewart Parry	For service to paediatric medicine and to child health through the introduction of innovative development programs, the promotion of prevention and early intervention, and contributions to protection services.
Lindsay Richard Partridge	For service to the building and construction industry, particularly in the areas of industry training and career development, and to the community.
Dr Russel John Perry	For service to the community of Western Australia as a leader in urban design, through contributions to the sport of Rugby Union football, and to the education and training sector.
Elke Brita Pfau	For service to the German community of South Australia through leadership of a range of welfare, aged care, sporting and cultural programs.
John Brian Pickett MVO	For service to higher education in the field of economics and business, to the development of mid-career business and community leaders through the Commonwealth, Pacific Region and Latin American Study Conferences, and to human resource management.
Peter Lloyd Pickles	For service to the community through the establishment of student leadership training programs, the provision of pastoral care for Members of Parliament, contributions to international aid programs, and philanthropic support for medical research.
Anthony Pietropiccolo	For service to the community of Western Australia as the Director of Centrecare through the generation of programs supporting individuals and families, including affordable housing and the welfare of Indigenous Australians and refugees.
Associate Professor Eileen Pittaway	For service to the refugee community, particularly women and girls, as a researcher, educator, publisher and lobbyist.
Professor David Henry Plowman	For service to the community through support for child migrants, as the founding Chair of Child Migrants of Malta, and to higher education.
Janet Frances Powell	For service to the Parliament of Australia, and to the community, particularly through leadership of YWCA Victoria.
Clinical Associate Professor Jonathan Rampono	For service to medicine as a psychiatrist, through support for women and newborn children, and to professional and social welfare organisations.
Professor Ronald Michael Rapee	For service to clinical psychology as a leader in the research and development of treatment programs for anxiety disorders, particularly in children.
Dr Raymond Francis Raper	For service to medicine in the field of intensive care as a clinician, researcher and educator, and through contributions to professional associations.
William Robert Reed	For service to business and commerce through the pearling industry, the marketing and promotion of jewellery, to tourism, and to the community of Broome.
Dr Ian Norman Reinecke	For service to information technology, particularly through leadership in the development and implementation of uniform national health systems and as an adviser and coordinator of the technology capability of the Sydney 2000 Olympic Games.
Mavis Anne Richardson PSM	For service to the community of the Manning Valley and its regions through contributions to local government and a range of arts, aged care, youth and Aboriginal community development programs.
Professor Bruce Gregory Robinson	For service to medicine in the field of endocrinology as a clinician, researcher and university administrator, and through the establishment and leadership of the Hoc Mai Australian Vietnam Medical Foundation.
Professor Dominic Brock Rowe	For service to medicine in the field of neurology through contributions to people with Motor Neurone Disease and Parkinson's Disease as a clinician, researcher, educator and administrator.
Associate Professor Tilman Alfred Ruff	For service to the promotion of peace as an advocate for the abolition of nuclear weapons, and to public health through the promotion of immunisation programs in the South East Asia-Pacific region.
Kenneth John Ryan	For service to the community through roles with charitable organisations supporting children and youth, to tourism, and to sport.
Robyne Schwarz	For service to the community of Victoria through leadership roles with a range of social, health and welfare organisations.
Sandra Sdraulig	For service to the arts through the promotion of the Australian film industry, particularly through leadership roles with the Adelaide Film Festival, Film Victoria and the Melbourne International Film Festival.
Dr Robert Dale Sharrad	For service to the environment through leadership of community conservation organisations, particularly the Nature Foundation of South Australia, and through science education and ecological field studies.
Ruth Ann Simms	For service to education as an Aboriginal Education Officer supporting children and their families and as a contributor to state curriculum planning, and to the community as an Indigenous representative at local and international forums.
Clive Henry Skarott	For service to the community of Queensland through the development of infrastructure to facilitate expanding export and tourism access, the establishment of credit union services, and through a range of tourism, sporting and educational organisations.
Dr Alfred William Smith †	For service to public administration in Victoria through oversight of major projects, including the relocation of the Melbourne Market, and contributions to public policy in transport and logistics development resulting in the effective delivery of road and rail transport solutions.
Dr Graham Jeffrey Sparrow	For service to mineral chemistry and to the mining industry as a research scientist and project manager in the development of metallurgical processes for upgrading Australia's mineral resources.
Alice Eve-Marie Spigelman	For service to the community as an advocate for human rights and social justice, particularly for women and refugees, and through contributions to cultural organisations.
The Reverend Emeritus Professor Peter Daniel Steele	For service to literature and higher education as a poet, author, scholar and teacher, and to the Catholic Church.
The Honourable Haddon Storey QC	For service to the Parliament of Victoria, particularly through law reform and contributions to cultural reinvigoration, to the arts through executive roles with cultural organisations, and to education.
Associate Professor Jonathan Raymond Stretch	For service to medicine and to the community as a plastic surgeon and oncologist and through Melanoma Institute Australia.
Dr Phillip Victor Tahmindjis	For service to the international community, and to the law, as a contributor and advocate for the promotion and protection of human rights.
His Honour Judge Kenneth Victor Taylor AM RFD	For service to the judiciary, to the law, and to the community through contributions in the areas of privacy, freedom of information, and in health and patient care matters.
Naomi Ruth Tippett	For service to children and their families nationally and internationally through the development of health and welfare programs, as a contributor to multicultural education, and to the promotion of social harmony.
Margaret Kenyon Tomkins PSM	For service to the community through the development of supported group housing, the provision of a range of mental health programs and advocacy and support for technology to assist the blind and partially sighted.
The Honourable Judith Mary Troeth	For service to the Parliament of Australia and to the community through contributions to public policy development and support for asylum seekers and women's rights.
Phillip John Vanny	For service to the surf lifesaving movement through executive roles at national, state and local level.
Susan Gae Walter	For service to the community through fundraising programs for childhood cancer research, particularly as Founder of the Steven Walter Children's Cancer Foundation.
Dr Bruce Ian Watson RFD	For service to dentistry, particularly in the field of orthodontics as a clinician and educator, and through leadership roles with professional organisations.
Professor Malcolm John West	For service to cardiovascular medicine as a clinician, researcher, academic and mentor, and to the community through contributions to medical foundations and charities.
Bernard Wheelahan	For service to business through a range of executive and advisory roles, to Australian Latin-American relations, to professional associations, and to the community.
Professor Geoffrey Hamilton White †	For service to vascular surgery as an academic, clinician and researcher, particularly through the development of the endovascular treatment of abdominal aortic aneurysms.
Heather Rose Wieland	For service to women and their families living in rural and regional areas through leadership roles within the Country Women's Association of Australia.
Martijn B. D. Wilder	For service to environmental law, particularly in the area of climate change through contributions to the development of law, global regulation, public policy and the promotion of public debate, and to the community.
Kimberley William Wilkie	For service to the community of Marysville in the aftermath of the 2009 Victorian bushfires.
Gerardus Maria Willems	For service to the arts as a concert pianist, music educator and mentor to young musicians.
Scott Malcolm Williams	For service to the community of New England through a range of contributions to higher education, business, local government, community radio and philanthropy.
The Honourable Donald George Wing	For service to the Parliament of Tasmania, to the transport, tourism and conservation sectors, and to the community through a range of educational, sporting, multicultural and humanitarian endeavours.
Mr Robert Winnel	For service to the building and construction industry in the area of property development for home builders, through contributions to professional organisations, and to philanthropy.
Richard Woldendorp	For service to the arts as an Australian landscape photographer.
The Honourable David Charles Wotton	For service to the Parliament and community of South Australia through contributions to environmental management, family and community services, and the ageing.
Brian Fredrick Wright	For service to architecture through leadership roles in professional organisations and contributions to the establishment of standards for the education of architects and the practice of architecture.
Dr Malcolm Wright	For service to intensive care medicine, as a clinician, teacher and administrator, and through advanced medical training programs in developing countries.

==== Military Division ====
Branch	Recipient	Citation
Navy	Commodore Michael Joseph Noonan	For exceptional performance of duty and leadership as Director General Operations, Headquarters Joint Operations Command and as Director Military Strategic Commitments.
Army	Brigadier Shane Francis Caughey CSC	For exceptional performance of duty as Assistant Commander – Afghanistan, Joint Task Force 633 on Operation Slipper.
Army	Colonel Steven James Lee	For exceptional service as Director of Information and Communications Technology Capability Management from 2007 to 2008, and Commandant Defence Command Support Training Centre from 2009 to 2011.
Army	Brigadier Michael Leo Phelps	For exceptional service in the fields of acquisition and sustainment of land capability for the Australian Defence Force.
Army	Colonel John William Shanahan MBE	For exceptional service as the Staff Officer Grade One Collective Training Land Headquarters, Acting Assistant Chief of Staff Headquarters Forces Command and Force Engineer at Headquarters 6th Brigade.
Army	Colonel David John Smith	For exceptional service as Staff Officer Grade One Force Structure Plans, Army Headquarters and Commanding Officer, 2nd Battalion, the Royal Australian Regiment.
Air Force	Air Commodore Tracy Lee Smart	For exceptional performance of duty as a medical officer in the Royal Australian Air Force.
Air Force	Chaplain Ian Stuart Whitley	For exceptional service to the Royal Australian Air Force and the Australian community as an Air Force Chaplain.

=== Medal (OAM) ===
==== General Division ====
Recipient	Citation
The Reverend Canon Dr Peter James Adam	For service to theological education, and to the Anglican Church of Australia.
James Henderson Allen	For service to the sport of recreational fishing through a range of business, promotional and voluntary roles.
Dr Stephen Edward Andersen	For service to medical education, to the specialty of pathology, and to the community of the Illawarra region.
Graeme James Anderson	For service to the dairy and water management industries in Victoria, and to the sport of cricket.
Norman Edwin Anderton MBE	For service to veterans, particularly through the National Ex-Prisoners of War Association.
Brian David Arnold	For service to the communities of Pakenham and Phillip Island.
Reginald Athelstane Arnold	For service to the sport of cycling.
Christine Marie Ash	For service to education, particularly through the Victorian Association of Catholic Primary School Principals.
Brett Thomas Austine	For service to the sport of gymnastics as a competitor, coach and judge.
John Benjamin Aynsley	For service to the Uniting Church in Australia, and to the community of Moss Vale.
Terry Dale Baker	For service to the community of Casterton through a range of emergency service organisations.
William Henry Barnett	For service to the boat-building industry as a designer and craftsman, and to the sport of sailing.
Terence Arthur Barritt	For service to the community through Rotary International.
Richard John Barton	For service to surf lifesaving in Queensland at local and state level.
Pastor Leslie James Batchelor	For service to the community through a range of church and social welfare organisations.
Russell William Bate	For service to the community through executive roles with a range of sporting and arts organisations, and to local government.
Brian Battersby	For service to local government, and to the communities of the Pine Rivers Shire and the Moreton Bay Region.
Norman Jock Beattie	For service to the sport of Australian Rules football in rural areas of Western Australia.
Walter Roland Beckhouse	For service to veterans and their families through the National Service and Combined Forces Association of Australia.
Noelene Gweneth Beer	For service to the Anglican Church of Australia.
Eric Keith Bennett	For service to the community of Hackam West.
Raymond Robert Black	For service to the advertising industry, particularly through the development of talent in the fields of writing and art direction.
Donald John Blair RFD ED	For service to veterans through the Returned and Services League of Australia, and to the community.
Donald Ian Blesing	For service to the primary industry sector in South Australia, and to the community.
Keith Alfred Bottomley	For service to music as a choirmaster and organist, and to the community of Castlemaine.
Dr Don Maxwell Bowley	For service to medicine through the Royal Flying Doctor Service.
Gregory James Brown	For service to the community through support and fundraising roles for a range of charitable organisations.
Rosalie Heather Brown	For service to the community, particularly through the Anglican Mothers' Union and the National Parks of South Australia.
Gloria Jean Bruzzone †	For service to the community through a range of emergency service organisations.
Robert Errol Buchan	For service to local government, and to the community of the St George region.
Maureen Frances Bugden	For service to veterans and their families through a range of volunteer roles.
Frances Mary Burns	For service to the community of the Sale region through volunteer roles with emergency service organisations.
George James Burns	For service to the community of the Sale region through volunteer roles with emergency service organisations.
Kevin Butler	For service to the community as the Co-Founder of Blaze Aid.
Rhonda Antoinette Butler	For service to the community as the Co-Founder of Blaze Aid.
Peter Edmund Byrne	For service to the community of the Mildura region, to the law, and to aviation.
Cameron Scott Caine	For service to the community of Kinglake, particularly in the aftermath of the 2009 Victorian bushfires.
Professor Trevor Henry Cairney	For service to education as an academic and administrator, and to business through leadership roles within professional organisations.
William Bernard Callaghan	For service to community health through the Rett Syndrome Association of Australia.
Kevin Joseph Callinan	For service to the community of Ku-ring-gai.
Barbara Anne Cameron	For service to dentistry.
Bruce Kirkpatrick Campbell	For service to local government, and to the community of the Bass Coast Shire.
Alfred Clive Carpenter ED	For service to veterans and their families, particularly through the Hamilton Sub-Branch of the Returned and Services League of Australia.
Frances Anne Carter	For service to the community of Port Hedland, particularly through the Country Women's Association.
Thomas Ronald Carter	For service to community health through support roles for people living with HIV/AIDS.
Eric James Cavanagh	For service to veterans through the Royal Australian Air Force Association and the Returned and Services League of Australia.
Michael Derek Chapman	For service to the community of Arthurs Creek, particularly during the 2009 Victorian bushfires.
Dale Franklin Cleves	For service to the tourism and hospitality industry, and to music.
John Joseph Clifford	For service to public administration in the Australian Capital Territory.
Professor Philip Rodney Clongan	For service to medicine, particularly in the field of oncology, to medical education, and to professional organisations.
Russell Gordon Close	For service to the community through roles with Rotary.
Graham David Coldwell	For service to the sport of rowing in South Australia.
Brian Kenneth Colyer	For service to the community, particularly through pastoral care roles.
The Reverend Peter Bertram Cook	For service to the Uniting Church in Australia, and to the community.
Ivan Peter Copley	For service to the Indigenous community of South Australia through a range of executive and advisory roles.
Clifford Reeve Cowdroy	For service to remote education through the Bush Children's Education Foundation of New South Wales.
Lily Joy Cowen	For service to the community through a range of charitable, arts and music organisations.
Dr Kay Lorraine Cox	For service to the sport of swimming at local, state and national levels through coaching and technical roles, and to the community.
Helen Stewart Croll-Wilson	For service to medical history through curatorial roles with the Royal Prince Alfred Hospital Heritage Centre.
Brian Cumberland	For service to conservation and the environment in the Australian Capital Territory and south east New South Wales region.
Ronald John Cuskelly	For service to aviation through roles with the Queensland Air Museum and the Aviation Historical Society of Australia.
Vyvyan Charles Dance	For service to the communities of Browns Plains and Logan.
Captain Jenkin Owen Davies	For service to youth, particularly through the Leeuwin Ocean Adventure Foundation.
Dr Joseph Latimer Davis	For service to medicine in the field of ophthalmology.
Giovanni Battista De Bellis	For service to the Italian community of New South Wales.
Dr Harry Alfred Derham	For service to psychiatry, particularly in the field of eating disorders.
Romano Natalino Di Donato	For service to the Italian community of New South Wales.
Stephen Dickman	For service to veterans through the Mittagong Sub-Branch of the Returned and Services League of Australia.
Hugh Johnstone Dixon	For service to people with a disability through the Teralba Association.
Phyllis Marjorie Dixon	For service to people with a disability through the Teralba Association.
Edith May Dobbin	For service to the community of Maclean.
Ulrich Günter Dobratz	For service to the community of Walhalla through a range of historical organisations.
Anne Margaret Doring	For service to the sport of netball through administrative roles.
Kerry Douran	For service to veterans through the Norfolk Island Sub-Branch of the Returned and Services League of Australia.
Paul Dracakis	For service to the community of Manly-Warringah, and to business.
Robert James Drake	For service to the oyster farming industry in New South Wales.
Lynne Muriel Duckham	For service to the community, particularly through Rotary International.
Barry John Dudman	For service to youth through the Scouting movement, and to the community of Burnie.
Deirdre Isobel Duncan	For service to the community of Gilgandra through a range of organisations.
Roy Alexander Duncan	For service to the community of Gilgandra through a range of organisations.
Faten El Dana	For service to the Lebanese community of New South Wales.
Mark Anthony Elsley	For service to the community of Muswellbrook.
Edward Harold Emerson	For service to the sport of golf.
John Philip Engisch	For service to the print media industry, and to the community of Bankstown.
Michael Elliott Evans	For service to the community through executive roles with Oxfam Australia, and to engineering.
Ian Leslie Ewart	For service to the community of the Traralgon region.
Mervyn John Ferguson	For service to the community, particularly through Apex and Lions Australia.
Rosalind Louise Fischl	For service to the community through lay leadership of The Great Synagogue, Sydney, and a range of orthodox Jewish organisations.
Dr Anthony Graham Fisher	For service to medicine in rural Western Australia, to medical research, and to the community.
Kevin James Fjeldsoe	For service to mental health care in Queensland, particularly in the area of service provision and reform.
Wayne Fletcher	For service to the sport of athletics.
Dr Griff Foley	For service to conservation and the environment, and to education.
Mary Christina Fraser	For service to local government, and to the community of the Towong Shire.
Dr Roger Freeman RFD	For service to the documentation and preservation of Australian military history.
Elizabeth Isabel Frost	For service to the pharmaceutical industry through a range of roles with professional organisations.
Walter William Fry	For service to surf lifesaving.
Colette Mary Garnsey	For service to business, particularly in the retail apparel sector, and to professional organisations.
James Patrick Geiger	For service to the sport of cricket in rural Queensland.
Lieutenant Colonel Ian Douglas George RFD ED	For service to veterans through the Defence Reserves Association, and to the community.
Dr Moheb Ghaly	For service to medicine, and to the community of Taree.
Marco Raymond Gibbons	For service to veterans and their families.
Louise Anne Gilfedder	For service to conservation and the environment, particularly in Tasmania.
Noel Clifford Gillard	For service to the community through leadership and administrative roles with a range of emergency management and ambulance service organisations.
Christine Mary Gilligan	For service to education as a primary school teacher.
Rodney Anthony Gray	For service to the community through policing and Indigenous liaison roles.
Judith Magnus Grieve	For service to the community of Armidale.
Elaine May Guterres	For service to the sport of rowing, particularly through the South Australian Women's Rowing Association.
Sandy Halley †	For service to public administration, to the community of the Illawarra region, and to local government.
Mostyn William Hancock	For service to the community of Willunga.
Michel Lindores Harbourd	For service to veterans and their families, and to the community of the Clarence Valley.
John Laurence Hardy	For service to aviation in the Northern Territory, and to the community.
Dulcie Ruth Harrison	For service to the communities of Kingswood and Mt Druitt, particularly through the Mount Druitt Hospital Auxiliary.
Neiven Maxwell Harrison	For service to the community of Kingswood, particularly through the Kingswood Neighbourhood Centre.
Brenda Harvey	For service to the community of Mission Beach through social welfare and conservation organisations.
Barbara Rosemary Haynes	For service to the community through support for a range of medical research, arts and social welfare organisations.
Daphne May Hazell	For service to the community of Clovelly Park.
Donald George Heath	For service to the community of Oxley.
Janet Frances Heath	For service to the community of Oxley.
John Edward Hegvold	For service to the sport of basketball, and to the community of Rockhampton.
Margaret Judy Hogg	For service to the law, and through roles with cancer research organisations.
John Gordon Holder	For service to the building and construction industry, to professional organisations, and to the community of Noarlunga.
Arthur Ernest Holmes	For service to the performing arts, and to the community of Murwillumbah.
Colin Holt	For service to veterans and their families through roles with the Box Hill Sub-Branch of the Returned and Services League of Australia.
Robyn Mary Horsley	For service to occupational and environmental medicine, and to medical education.
Dr Catherine Adele Howell CSM	For service to medicine, particularly in the field of mental health, and to professional organisations.
Ann Denise Hoy	For service to music through the Tamworth Regional Conservatorium.
Glen Hubbard	For service to aged care, and to the sport of lawn bowls.
Peter Ross Hudson	For service to conservation and the environment through the Red Head Villages Association.
Beverley Anne Hughes	For service to community health, particularly in the area of orthopaedics.
Derrick James Humphrey	For service to music, and to the community of Ocean Grove.
David James Hutton	For service to education in Queensland, and through roles with professional organisations.
Alexandra Lindsay Hynes	For service to the deaf and hearing impaired through advocacy roles, and to improving access to the visual media.
Richard Oliver Jackson-Hope	For service to the community of Springwood.
Ronald George Jacobs AFSM	For service to the community through roles with historical, local government and emergency service organisations.
Dr Christopher St John James	For service to medicine in the field of obstetrics and gynaecology, and to medical education.
Dr Nicholas Andrew Jans	For service to the community of Marysville, particularly in the aftermath of the 2009 Victorian bushfires.
Michel Elias Jarjoura	For service to the Lebanese community of New South Wales.
Donald James Jarrett	For service to music, and to the community.
Nigel Leslie Jeny	For service to the community through a range of roles at local and national level with Lions Australia.
Neil William Johnston	For service to the community of Meander.
Christopher James Johnstone	For service to veterans and their families through the Flinders Sub-Branch of the Returned and Services League of Australia.
Henry Jolson QC	For service to the law, particularly in the area of alternative dispute resolution, to professional organisations, and to the community.
Dianne Mary Jones	For service to nursing, particularly in the field of gastroenterology.
John Barry Jones	For service to the preservation and conservation of maritime history.
Mair Margretta Jones	For service to the community, particularly through the preservation of medical artefacts.
Roger Trelease Jones	For service to the community through executive roles with a range of emergency service organisations.
Dr Vijay Joshi	For service to the Australian steel mill industry, and to the Indian community of New South Wales.
Associate Professor Elizabeth Carment Kalucy	For service to community health, and to the development of professional standards.
Ann Kelly	For service to health administration, to nursing, and to professional organisations.
David Kenley	For service to communities affected by the 2009 Victorian bushfires, particularly through coordination and action of relief efforts provided by the Australian Children's Trust.
Michael George Kirk	For service to health service administration in Victoria, and to the community, particularly through Rotary and Operation Cleft.
The Honourable Elisabeth Wilma Kirkby	For service to the Parliament of New South Wales, to the community of Temora, and to the performing arts.
Victor Kovalenko	For service to sport, particularly as the national head coach of the Australian Olympic Sailing team.
Dr Johanna Maria Kovats	For service to medicine in rural and regional New South Wales, particularly in the area of women's health.
Dr Harold Davies Lane	For service to medicine as a rural general practitioner, and to the community of Balaklava and District.
Kimberly Anne Larkin	For service to sport, and to people with a disability, through roles with the Australian Pearls Basketball team.
Maxwell Leslie Laughton	For service to the community of Penrith, and to the sport of harness racing.
Wendy Gaye Lawson	For service to the community of the Hunter Valley region through a range of roles with environmental and tourism organisations, and to viticulture.
Clarice Ellen Lees	For service to the community, particularly through the Country Women's Association of Victoria.
Wayne Charles Leo	For service to the community through the Spinal Injuries Association.
Margaret Peck Leong	For service to youth as the Co-Founder of the Nova Youth Orchestra.
Michael David Letch	For service to people with a disability through the Disabled Divers Association Victoria.
Carolyn Lieutenant	For service to equestrian sport, particularly through coaching roles with the Australian Paralympic team.
David James Lister	For service to the community of Nyngan through the Livestock Health and Pest Authority.
Archonto Livas	For service to the community of the Australian Capital Territory through a range of volunteer roles.
Vivienne Annetta Llewellyn	For service to the community through contributions in the areas of welfare, children's services and aged care.
Dr John Viner Lloyd	For service to medicine in the field of haematology, to medical education, and to professional organisations.
Alison June Lockett	For service to the community through the Morialta Uniting Church.
John Carlisle Low	For service to the community of the Blue Mountains as a historian, author and librarian.
Craig Andrew Lowndes	For service to motor racing and to the community, particularly through road safety education programs and charitable organisations.
Jenniwaty Luhur	For service to the community through the Royal Brisbane and Women's Hospital Foundation.
Kenneth Jacob Lyons	For service to veterans and their families, and to the community through a range of volunteer roles.
Sister Heather Louise McClymont	For service to the community through the Institute of Sisters of Mercy.
Dr David Henry McConnel	For service to medicine, particularly as an anaesthetist, through a range of executive and professional roles.
Christine Anne McDonald	For service to the community of Cloncurry, and to the arts.
Frederick Alexander McDonald	For service to veterans and their families, and to the community through a range of charitable organisations.
Dugald Grant McDougall RD	For service to the community through executive roles with a range of youth, sailing, church and service organisations.
Ronald Thomas McElwaine RFD ED	For service to veterans and their families through the Returned and Services League of Australia.
David Victor McGahy	For service to the communities of Arthurs Creek and Strathewen, particularly in the aftermath of the 2009 Victorian bushfires.
Neil James McGarvie	For service to Indigenous education, and to the community of Buderim as an historian and author.
Dr Mary Ellen MacGinley	For service to theological education.
Anthony William McGloughlin	For service to secondary education in the Australian Capital Territory.
Graham John McGuinness	For service to medical administration, and to the community of the Central Coast.
Dr Alice MacLennan	For service to medicine, particularly in the area of women's reproductive health, and through roles with professional organisations.
Elsie Janet McLeod	For service to nursing, particularly in the specialty of Parkinson's disease.
Margaret Mary McMurray	For service to the community through the Country Women's Association, and to youth through the Guiding movement.
The Reverend Archibald MacNicol †	For service to the Presbyterian Church of Queensland, and to the community.
Neil Pennell Macindoe	For service to the community through the preservation of local heritage in the Glebe region, and to local government.
Margaret May Mackenzie	For service to the sport of rowing as a competitor, coach and administrator.
Lewis John Mackereth	For service to the performing arts as a country music singer and entertainer.
Mervyn Arthur Mancer	For service to aged persons, and to the community.
Francis Leonard Manthey	For service to wildlife preservation, particularly as Co-Founder of the Save the Bilby Fund.
Beryl Ruth Marshall	For service to the community of Ulverstone, and to local government.
Dr James Herbert Martin	For service to medicine, particularly in the field of ophthalmology, and to the community.
Bryan Leslie Mason	For service to youth through Rotary Oceania Medical Aid for Children, and to the community.
Terrence John Mather	For service to the community, particularly through fundraising roles for the ABC Giving Tree.
John James Meehan	For service to the community through a range of roles with Rotary International.
Lorraine Jean Meehan	For service to the community through volunteer roles.
Michael Victor Meszaros	For service to the visual arts as a sculptor.
Valerie Clarice Millar	For service to the community as the Founder of 24/7 Volunteer Health Care Service at the Wagga Wagga Base Hospital.
Judith Alice Miller	For service to the community of Far North Queensland through mediation and dispute resolution organisations.
Dr William David Miller	For service to rural medicine as an obstetrician and surgeon, and to the community of Cootamundra.
John Raymond Millington	For service to aviculture and to the community of Nhill.
Ann Mitchell	For service to nursing through a range of volunteer roles.
Margaret Alice Molina	For service to the sport of netball in Victoria as an administrator, coach and player at state and national level.
Brett Moore	For service to recreational boating and maritime services in New South Wales through public administration roles.
Suzanne Mordaunt	For service to the law through pro-bono support for a range of community organisations.
Lieutenant Colonel Barry Morgan	For service to veterans and their families, particularly through the 5th Battalion, The Royal Australian Regiment Association.
Charles Henry Morris	For service to the Australian wine industry, and to the community of Howlong.
Helen Margaret Morris	For service to the community of South Australia through the Healthy Food in Schools Project.
Betty Joan Mounser	For service to the community, particularly through the Queensland Branch of Solace Australia.
Barbara Joyce Murphy	For service to industrial relations, and to the education sector, through a range of representative roles.
Denyse Lydia Needham	For service to the community through a range of charitable and environment organisations, and to local government.
Eleanor Eva Nimmo	For service to the community through a range of charitable and service organisations.
Christopher Guy Noel	For service to the sport of rowing in New South Wales.
Dr Akram Omeri	For service to nursing through the Transcultural Nursing Society.
Eric Maxwell Palmer	For service to people with disabilities, particularly through the Scouting movement.
Squadron Leader John Norris Parker AFC DFM	For service to veterans and their families through a range of organisations.
Ronald John Parker	For service to the community through a range of volunteer roles.
Avril Lee Parry	For service to people with a disability, particularly as Co-Director of 'Wheelchairs Rule OK ON' Disability Camps.
The Reverend Leslie Achille Pearson	For service to the community through a range of social welfare, church and aged care organisations.
Merrilyn Faye Pedergnana	For service to veterans and their families, and to the community of Broken Hill.
Lynette Joan Peebles	For service to the community through fundraising support for medical research organisations.
Gerard Francis Petrie	For service to the communities of Kew and Anglesea through roles with church, local government and sporting organisations.
Christopher Macklin Pfeiffer	For service to the Australian wine industry as the Founder of Pfeiffer Wines, and to the community of Rutherglen.
Raymond Frederick Phillipson	For service to the community through a range of service and youth organisations.
Anthony John Pilkington	For service to the broadcast media industry as an announcer, and to the community.
Gaye Carolyn Porter	For service to the visual arts as a sculptor, author and educator.
Ross Anthony Presgrave †	For service to the community of Forster, particularly through roles with charitable and service organisations.
Alick John Purcell	For service to primary industry, and to the community.
Robert Henry Rankin AFSM	For service to the community through the Country Fire Authority.
David George Redfearn	For service to conservation and the environment, to local government, and to the community.
Leslie Arnold Reedman	For service to architecture, to professional and historical preservation organisations, and to the community.
Carl Robert Reid	For service to the Jewish community, particularly through contributions to the management of schools and through the United Israel Appeal of New South Wales.
Janet Reid	For service to the law through a range of organisations, and to the community.
Robert James Reid	For service to the community of the Blue Mountains through a range of tourism, health and service organisations.
Professor Ruth Rentschler	For service to education, to the arts, and to the community.
Ruth Mary Richards	For service to the community of the City of Shoalhaven through a range of service organisations.
Desmond Maurice Ritchie	For service to the performing arts, and to conservation and the environment in Queensland.
Michael Martin Robins	For service to people with a physical disability through The House with No Steps.
James Alan Roennfeldt	For service to the community of Marysville, particularly in the aftermath of the 2009 Victorian bushfires.
Dr Ronald Rosen	For service to science, particularly in the field of radiation protection, and to professional organisations.
Paul Robert Rosser	For service to the community of Willunga through a range of environmental organisations.
Dr Neville John Rothfield RFD	For service to paediatric medicine in the Newcastle region and to community health through the Broadmeadow Medical Centre.
Richard William Ruhfus	For service to the community of the Southern Highlands region through roles with visual arts and charitable organisations.
Owen William Rushton	For service to the community of Nambucca, particularly through Marine Rescue New South Wales.
Mary Philomena Schneider	For service to the performing arts as a country music singer, songwriter and entertainer.
Gilbert Charles Sheppard	For service to veterans and their families, to local government, and to the community.
Samantha Sheppard	For service to women, to the building and construction industry, and to the community.
Helen Shervington	For service to the community of the Busselton shire, and to local government.
Pastor Barry Leonard Silverback	For service to the community through Christian Revival Crusade Churches International.
Ralph Alexander Sinclair	For service to science education.
John James Skelton	For service to community health through advocacy, respite and support services.
The Honourable Keith Alan Slack †	For service to the judiciary and to the law in Queensland, and to professional legal associations.
Janice Edna Smith	For service to the sport of swimming, particularly as an official and instructor, and to the community.
Judith Helen Smith	For service to the sport of swimming, particularly as an official and instructor, and to the community.
Anthony Stephen Springett	For service to the community of Bowral through a range of business, charitable and sporting organisations.
Harry Spirintz	For service to architecture, particularly in the field of disability access.
Kristin Mary Stegley	For service to the community through heritage advocacy and contributions to the Victorian Branch of the National Trust of Australia, to the arts, and to local government.
Paul Francis Stephenson	For service to local government, and to the community.
Peter John Stephenson	For service to veterans and their families through the Toronto Sub-Branch of the Returned and Services League of Australia.
Mary Jean Stevenson	For service to the community of Boggabri through a range of sporting, church and service organisations.
Scott Mark Stidston	For service to the community through the Spinal Injuries Association.
Alexander Robson Stoneman	For service to education, and to the community of the Central Goldfields region.
Stuart Thomas Strickland	For service to the automotive industry through executive and professional roles.
Dr David Thornton Taylor	For service to dentistry, particularly through executive roles with professional organisations, and to the community.
Amanda Louise Thane	For service to the performing arts as an opera singer, performer and teacher, and to the community.
Barbara Olive Timmins	For service to the community, particularly as a teacher of highland dancing.
Peter Harry Vogel	For service to conservation and the environment, and to the community.
Heather Esme Waldron	For service to community health in the field of optometry, and to the community.
Mildred Lucy Walkley	For service to the arts of embroidery and needlecraft, particularly as an educator and textile conservationist, and to the Guiding movement.
Douglas Elliott Walter	For service to the community of Marysville, particularly in the aftermath of the 2009 Victorian bushfires.
Peter John Waltisbuhl	For service to the community through executive roles with church and service organisations.
Michael Anthony Weatherald	For service to the sports of cricket and Australian Rules football as a coach and administrator.
Charlotte Webb	For service to the community, particularly through the Southern Highlands Botanic Gardens.
Peter John Weeks	For service to the community of the Upper Goulburn region, particularly during the 2009 Victorian bushfires.
Dr Drew James Wenck	For service to intensive care medicine through advisory roles, and to the community.
Barbara Maureen Wheaton	For service to the community, particularly through the Friends of the Botanic Gardens of Adelaide.
Dr Keith Milroy Whish	For service to medicine as a general practitioner, and to the community of Inverell.
Dr Philippa Nancy Whish	For service to medicine as a general practitioner, and to the community of Inverell.
Dr Raymond Frederick White	For service to medicine in the field of rheumatology, and to youth.
Sarah White	For service to the community through a range of charitable organisations.
Dr James Harrington Whittem	For service to veterinary science through a range of professional roles, and to the community.
Donald Whitworth	For service to the community, particularly through the Campervan and Motorhome Club of Australia.
Richard George Williams	For service to the community through executive and fundraising roles with the Royal Children's Hospital.
Robert Lewis Williams	For service to overseas humanitarian aid projects, particularly through the Seeds of Life Program in Timor Leste.
Jean Margaret Wise	For service to local government, to the community of the Yarriambiack region, and to women.
Ruth Rebecca Wisniak	For service to community health, particularly in the field of psychology, to youth, and to the community.
Dr Frank Michael Wolf	For service to the community through a range of Jewish organisations.
Allen Woodham	For service to music, particularly through band organisations, and to the community of Mount Gambier.
Rex Robert Worrell	For service to conservation and the environment through the South Coast Shore Bird Recovery Program.
John Inglis Young	For service to the performing arts as a singer and songwriter, and through support for a range of charitable organisations.
Colonel Leslie James Young	For service to veterans and their families.
Joe Zekulich	For service to the wine grape industry in Western Australia through advances in vine health, and as a vigneron.
Eva Evaggelia Zouppas	For service to the Greek Orthodox community of Brisbane.
The Reverend Wayne Theodore Zweck	For service to the community through the Lutheran Church of Australia.
Michael Zylberman	For service to the community through a range of Jewish organisations.

==== Military Division ====
Branch	Recipient	Citation
Navy	Warrant Officer Debbie Ann Butterworth CSM	For meritorious service to the Royal Australian Navy in the field of logistics management.
Navy	Captain Andrew Fysh	For meritorious service in the fields of Marine Engineering and Engineering Management.
Navy	Commander Charles Harrod	For meritorious performance of duty as Acting Director of Studies and as Directing Staff at the Australian Command and Staff College.
Navy	Senior Chaplain Russell Stewart Joyce	For meritorious service in the field of Chaplaincy in the Royal Australian Navy.
Navy	Warrant Officer Anthony William Wills	For meritorious service in the fields of Aviation Engineering, Aviation Safety and Aviation Cultural Leadership.
Army	Warrant Officer Class One Paul Thomas Bodsworth	For meritorious service as the regimental Sergeant Major of the Force Level Logistic Asset Five, 9th Support Battalion and Force Support Unit Four.
Army	Warrant Officer Class One Daniel Leslie Braban	For meritorious service as Intelligence Operations Warrant Officer and Regimental Sergeant Major, 1st Intelligence Battalion from 2008 to 2011.
Army	Warrant Officer Class One Brett Anthony Brown	For meritorious service as Regimental Sergeant Major, 11th/28th Battalion, the Royal Western Australian Regiment and 6th Battalion, the Royal Australian Regiment.
Army	Warrant Officer Class One Martin Francis Burgess	For meritorious service as Regimental Sergeant Major of the Army School of Electrical and Mechanical Engineering and Regimental Sergeant Major, 1st Combat Service Support Battalion.
Army	Warrant Officer Class One G—	For meritorious service in leadership roles.
Army	Warrant Officer Class One Mark Anthony Hall	For meritorious service in the field of logistics management.
Army	Warrant Officer Class One John Francis Heffernan CSM	For meritorious service as the Regimental Quartermaster Sergeant of the 6th Engineer Support Regiment and 2nd Combat Engineer Regiment.
Army	Warrant Officer Class One L—	For meritorious performance of duty in various positions.
Army	Captain M—	For meritorious service in leadership and liaison roles.
Air Force	Squadron Leader Michael John Duyvene De Wit	For meritorious performance of duty as an instructor at Joint Terminal Attack Control Troop and as Tactical Operations Officer at Number 44 Wing.
Air Force	Squadron Leader Damien Patrick Farrell	For meritorious service in the field of space-based surveillance for the Australian Defence Force.
Air Force	Squadron Leader Andrew Michael Jackson	For meritorious service as Number 81 Wing Standardisation Officer and ‘B’ Flight Commander, Number 2 Operational Conversion Unit.
Air Force	Warrant Officer Kerry John Mann	For meritorious service in the field of airlift operations and support.

== Public Service Medal (PSM) ==
Branch	Recipient	Citation
Aust.	Gillian Elizabeth Bird	For outstanding public service in the field of international relations, particularly for major contributions to the provision of consular services and to Australia's engagement with the South East Asian region.
Aust.	Lee Cale	For outstanding public service in working in partnership with industries to assist them to import and export animals safely.
Aust.	Anthony John Corcoran	For outstanding public service in managing the Freedom of Information function for Defence.
Aust.	Simon Brook Cotterell	For outstanding public service in developing and implementing tobacco reforms and in leading programs which resulted in Australia's reduction in smoking rates.
Aust.	Ian Rodney Mannix	For outstanding public service in establishing and managing the delivery of ABC's emergency broadcasting services.
Aust.	Mark William Pitt	For outstanding public service in leadership of, and contribution to, the development of Australia's countermeasures development and validation capability.
Aust.	Cathryn Gay Pope	For outstanding public service in delivering the Government's commitments in relation to expanding community detention arrangements for asylum seekers.
Aust.	Linda Patricia Richardson	For outstanding public service in undertaking significant commercial law work and as leader of AGS Commercial.
Aust.	Rocío María Trapaga-Saul	For outstanding public service in the operational delivery of compliance and case resolution services for all relevant Department of Immigration and Citizenship clients in the east and north of the country
Aust.	Paul Gerard White	For outstanding public service through contributing to social policy reform, particularly on education and school funding policy development.
NSW	Dr Paul Felix Arthur	For outstanding public service in the field of animal breeding and genetics.
NSW	Jane Elizabeth Cavanagh	For outstanding public service to education in western New South Wales.
NSW	Kathleen Mary Compton	For outstanding public service to education in New South Wales.
NSW	Karen Janne Crawshaw	For outstanding public service as the Deputy Director General, Governance Workforce and Corporate within NSW Health.
NSW	Graeme Leslie Fleming	For outstanding public service as the General Manager of the Cabonne Council in New South Wales.
NSW	Frank Richard Howarth	For outstanding public service to the Australian Museum in Sydney.
NSW	Dr Philip Walker Lambert	For outstanding public service to education in New South Wales.
NSW	Brad William Mullard	For outstanding public service to policy development, assessment and allocation of the energy and mineral resources in New South Wales.
NSW	John Sidney Roach	For outstanding public service to public sector financial management and accountability in New South Wales.
NSW	Barry Raymond Simpson	For outstanding public service to the National Parks and Wildlife Services in New South Wales.
NSW	Leilani Rosanne Watson	For outstanding public service to the development of employment opportunities for Indigenous people in New South Wales.
Vic.	Paul Laurence Buckley	For outstanding public service and sustained leadership to the local community.
Vic.	Valerie Joy Callister	For outstanding public service to the Gippsland region, especially in the areas of relief and recovery following natural disasters.
Vic.	Bruce Andrew Gardner	For outstanding public service to criminal law reform.
Vic.	Peter John Greenham	For outstanding public service to the transport portfolio and broader community in delivering property and services.
Vic.	Ronald Wright Harris	For outstanding public service in transforming the lamb industry into a vibrant and export oriented industry, and in leading the development and delivery of innovative services for farmers and rural communities.
Vic.	Jane Margaret Herington	For outstanding public service to the Victorian aged care system, improving the lives of many older Victorians, people with disabilities and vulnerable client groups.
Vic.	Ronald Francis Irwin	For outstanding public service to the detection, investigation and resolution of crime on the public transport system.
Vic.	Craig William Lapsley	For outstanding public service to the community through the improvement of the emergency management sector.
Vic.	Kerryn Vincent Shade	For outstanding public service to local government in the Wimmera region.
Vic.	Randall Lyn Straw	For outstanding public service to the community as a leading advocate, strategist and practitioner of technology-based innovation, and for making a significant contribution to the development of Victoria's public sector, ICT industry and research base.
Vic.	Pamela Dawn White	For outstanding public service to disadvantaged and vulnerable people; and policy roles in disability, community care, child protection, youth justice and housing, and for her expertise in emergency management responses.
SA	Dr Paul Sinclair Heithersay	For outstanding public service to the growth and development of the mineral resources in South Australia.
SA	Michele Patterson	For outstanding public service in the area of occupational health and safely.
SA	Michele Ann Sutherland	For outstanding public service in the area of falls prevention.

== Australian Police Medal (APM) ==
Branch	Recipient
Australian Federal Police	Federal Agent Christopher Noel Douglas
Australian Federal Police	Detective Superintendent Noel Donald Scobell
Australian Federal Police	Assistant Commissioner Julian James Slater OAM
New South Wales Police	Superintendent Terence Joseph Jacobsen
New South Wales Police	Inspector John Terence Lipman
New South Wales Police	Sergeant Roger Hedley Mayer
New South Wales Police	Superintendent Desmond John Organ
New South Wales Police	Detective Inspector Greig Anthony Stier
New South Wales Police	Superintendent Elizabeth Anne Stirton
New South Wales Police	Superintendent Mark Francis Sweeney
New South Wales Police	Senior Sergeant David John Wheatley
Victoria Police	Commander Trevor Estyn Carter
Victoria Police	Leading Senior Constable Jeffrey Stephen O'Brien
Victoria Police	Superintendent Richard Julian Watkins
Victoria Police	Superintendent Rodney Graham Wilson
Queensland Police	Senior Sergeant Gary Colin Campbell
Queensland Police	Detective Chief Superintendent Brian John Codd
Queensland Police	Sergeant Colin Robert Giles
Queensland Police	Superintendent Michael Bennett Keller
Queensland Police	Inspector Michael McKay
Queensland Police	Sergeant Rachel Anne Whitford
Western Australia Police	Inspector Paul John Dallimore
Western Australia Police	Commander Michell Louis Fye
Western Australia Police	Inspector Barry John Shelton
Western Australia Police	Assistant Commissioner Craig Maxwell Ward
South Australia Police	Chief Superintendent Michael John Cornish
South Australia Police	Superintendent Linda Jane Fellows
South Australia Police	Senior Sergeant Martin Hawkins
Northern Territory Police	Superintendent Megan Hood Rowe

== Australian Fire Service Medal (AFSM) ==
Branch	Recipient
New South Wales Fire Services	Robert Gregory Alexander
New South Wales Fire Services	Alan Geoffrey Anderson
New South Wales Fire Services	Michael William Brooks
New South Wales Fire Services	Wayne George Buxton
New South Wales Fire Services	Bruce John Cameron
New South Wales Fire Services	Robert Raymond Crawford
New South Wales Fire Services	Donald Norman Langdon
New South Wales Fire Services	William James Lea
New South Wales Fire Services	John Charles MacKenzie OAM
New South Wales Fire Services	Geoffrey William Olsen OAM
New South Wales Fire Services	David George Phillips
New South Wales Fire Services	Kevin Reginald Ryan
Victoria Fire Services	Alan George Dale
Victoria Fire Services	Peter Leslie Egan
Victoria Fire Services	Alan Goodwin
Victoria Fire Services	Donald Joseph Kelly
Victoria Fire Services	Peter Gordon Marke
Victoria Fire Services	Trevor Michael Roche
Victoria Fire Services	Joan Steel
Victoria Fire Services	William Murray Watson
Queensland Fire Services	Graham David Luck ED
Queensland Fire Services	Ian McDonald Mitchell
Queensland Fire Services	David Prain
Queensland Fire Services	John Vayro
Queensland Fire Services	Kevin Patrick Walsh
Western Australia Fire Services	Michael Gregory Cantelo
Western Australia Fire Services	Wayyne John Jones
Western Australia Fire Services	Colin Walter Malcolm
Western Australia Fire Services	Maxwell Frederick Osborn
Western Australia Fire Services	Christopher Raymond Sousa
South Australia Fire Services	Peter Grant Edgcumbe
South Australia Fire Services	Owen Douglas Glover
Australian Capital Territory Fire Services	Arthur Colin Sayer
Northern Territory Fire Services	Brett Douglas Holmes

== Ambulance Service Medal (ASM) ==
Branch	Recipient
Queensland Ambulance Service	Phillip William Axsentieff
Queensland Ambulance Service	Michael John Davis AM
South Australia Ambulance Service	Lorraine Amos
Norfolk Island Ambulance Service	Margaret Elizabeth Jackson

== Emergency Services Medal (ESM) ==
Branch	Recipient
New South Wales Emergency Services	Patrick John Clague
New South Wales Emergency Services	Bernard Gabriel
New South Wales Emergency Services	Robert William Herbert
New South Wales Emergency Services	David Henry Lyall PSM
Victoria Emergency Services	Bradley Shane Dalgleish
Queensland Emergency Services	Harry Phillip Hubner
Queensland Emergency Services	Iain Roy MacCulloch
Western Australia Emergency Services	Errol Ernest Hoare
South Australia Emergency Services	Peter John Willmott
ACT Emergency Services	Clive Andrew Gibbs

== Medal for Gallantry (MG) ==
Branch	Recipient	Citation
Army	Corporal Ryan James Avery	For acts of gallantry in action in hazardous circumstances on 4 December 2010 while a sniper team member in Mentoring Task Force – Two on Operation Slipper in Afghanistan.
Army	Bombardier David Steven Robertson	For acts of gallantry in action in hazardous circumstances on 20 March 2011 while a joint fires observer in Mentoring Task Force -Two on Operation Slipper in Afghanistan.
Army	Private T—	For acts of gallantry in action in hazardous circumstances while deployed on Operation Slipper.

== Commendation for Gallantry ==
Branch	Recipient	Citation
Army	Corporal C—	For acts of gallantry in action while a patrol medic on Operation Slipper in Afghanistan.
Army	Sergeant D—	For acts of gallantry in action while deployed as a troop sergeant on Operation Slipper in Afghanistan.
Army	Trooper O—	For acts of gallantry in action while deployed as a patrol medic on Operation Slipper in Afghanistan.
Army	Sergeant R—	For acts of gallantry in action while a platoon sergeant on Operation Slipper in Afghanistan.
Army	Lance Corporal S—	For acts of gallantry in action while a team second-in-command on Operation Slipper in Afghanistan.
Army	Private S—	For acts of gallantry in action while deployed on Operation Slipper in Afghanistan.

== Distinguished Service Cross (DSC) ==
Branch	Recipient	Citation
Army	Major General Angus John Campbell AM	For distinguished command and leadership in action as Commander Joint Task Force 633 on Operation Slipper from January 2011 to December 2011.
Army	Lieutenant Colonel G—	For distinguished command and leadership in action on Operation Slipper in Afghanistan.
Army	Colonel Darren David Huxley	For distinguished command and leadership in action as Commanding Officer, Mentoring Task Force – Two on Operation Slipper in Afghanistan.

== Distinguished Service Medal (DSM) ==
Branch	Recipient	Citation
Army	Captain J—	For distinguished leadership in action on Operation Slipper in Afghanistan.
Army	Corporal M—	For distinguished leadership in action while a lead mentor on Operation Slipper in Afghanistan.
Army	Colonel Dennis Francis Malone	For distinguished leadership in action as Deputy Commander, Combined Team Uruzgan on Operation Slipper in Afghanistan.
Army	Captain Nicholas James Perriman	For distinguished leadership in action as the Commander, Mentoring Team Two, Combat Team Delta, Mentoring Task Force – Two, on Operation Slipper in Afghanistan.
Army	Major S—	For distinguished leadership in action as the Officer Commanding on Operation Slipper in Afghanistan.
Army	Captain S—	For distinguished leadership in action as a troop commander on Operation Slipper in Afghanistan.
Army	Captain Scott Anthony Stort	For distinguished leadership in action as the Commander, Mentoring Team Four, Combat Team Charlie, Mentoring Task Force – Two on Operation Slipper in Afghanistan.

== Commendation for Distinguished Service ==
Branch	Recipient	Citation
Army	Major Nicholas John Bosio	For distinguished performance of duty in warlike operations as Officer Commanding, Engineer Task Unit and Staff Officer Plans, Mentoring Task Force – Two on Operation Slipper in Afghanistan.
Army	Major D—	For distinguished performance of duty in warlike operations and in action as the Regimental Medical Officer on Operation Slipper in Afghanistan.
Army	Captain D—	For distinguished performance of duty in warlike operations on Operation Slipper in Afghanistan.
Army	Corporal Marc Gregory Danieletto	For distinguished performance of duty in warlike operations and in action as a sniper team leader with Mentoring Task Force Two on Operation Slipper in Afghanistan.
Army	Lieutenant Colonel Matthew David Jones	For distinguished performance of duty in warlike operations as Director Counter Improvised Explosive Devices, Headquarters Joint Task Force 633, on Operation Slipper from November 2010 to November 2011.
Army	Colonel Andrew Ross Maclean	For distinguished performance of duty in warlike operations as Chief of Staff, Headquarters Joint Task Force 633 on Operation Slipper from October 2010 to August 2011.
Army	Colonel Rowan Athol Martin	For distinguished performance of duty in warlike operations as Chief of Future Operations, Headquarters Regional Command (South) while deployed on Operation Slipper in Afghanistan.
Army	Sergeant P—	For distinguished performance of duty in warlike operations and in action as a patrol commander on Operation Slipper in Afghanistan.
Army	Major Brenton John Pearce	For distinguished performance of duty in warlike operations and in action as the Officer Commanding Combat Team Bravo, Mentoring Task Force – Two on Operation Slipper in Afghanistan.
Army	Major Q—	For distinguished performance of duty in warlike operations and in action on Operation Slipper in Afghanistan.
Army	Major Paul Royston Rogers	For distinguished performance of duty in warlike operations as the Officer Commanding Force Support Team Tarin Kot, Force Support Unit Four, on Operation Slipper in Afghanistan in 2010 and 2011.
Army	Corporal S—	For distinguished performance of duty in warlike operations and in action while deployed as a sniper section commander on Operation Slipper in Afghanistan.
Army	Brigadier Bruce Andrew Scott CSC	For distinguished performance of duty in warlike operations as Deputy Commanding General – Force Development, Headquarters Regional Command (South) on Operation Slipper in Afghanistan from October 2010 to October 2011.
Army	Captain T—	For distinguished performance of duty in warlike operations and in action on Operation Slipper in Afghanistan.
Army	Warrant Officer Class One Philip James Thompson	For distinguished performance of duty in warlike operations as the Command Sergeant Major, Counterinsurgency Training Centre – Afghanistan from December 2010 to June 2011.
Air Force	Group Captain Andrew Craig Heap	For distinguished performance of duty in warlike operations as Air Component Commander, Joint Task Force 633 on Operation Slipper from November 2010 to May 2011.
Air Force	Wing Commander Jonathan Christian McMullan	For distinguished performance of duty in warlike operations as Commanding Officer, Heron Remotely Piloted Vehicle Detachment on Operation Slipper in Afghanistan from April to September 2011.
Air Force	Squadron Leader Jarrod Lee Pendlebury	For distinguished performance of duty in warlike operations as Commanding Officer, Heron Remotely Piloted Vehicle Detachment on Operation Slipper in Afghanistan from April to September 2011.
NZ Army	Major William Paul Keelan	For distinguished performance of duty in warlike operations as the Combined Joint Operations Officer, Headquarters Combined Team Uruzgan on Operation Slipper in Afghanistan from September 2010 to May 2011.

== Conspicuous Service Cross (CSC) ==
Branch	Recipient	Citation
Navy	Commodore John William Chandler CSM	
Navy	Commander Shane Leonard Glassock	For outstanding achievement as the Executive Officer, HMAS Cerberus.
Navy	Captain Darron John Kavanagh	For outstanding achievement as Project Director, Joint Project 2070 Light Weight Anti-Submarine Torpedo Replacement.
Navy	Lieutenant Commander Clifford Glenn Kyle	For outstanding achievement as the Aviation Engineering Officer of 816 Squadron.
Navy	Captain Bruce Lawrence Legge	For outstanding achievement as Commanding Officer of HMAS Warramunga.
Navy	Commander Michael Leslie Maley DSM	For outstanding achievement as Chief Staff Officer, Mine Warfare and Clearance Diving Group.
Navy	Commander Letitia Deborah Van Stralen	For outstanding achievement as the Fleet Legal Officer.
Army	Lieutenant Colonel John Noel Carey	For outstanding achievement as Commanding Officer, 2nd Combat Engineer Regiment.
Army	Colonel James Robert Evans	For outstanding achievement as the Commander Force Support Group and Chief of Staff Headquarters 17th Combat Service Support Brigade.
Army	Brigadier Dianne Maree Gallasch AM	For outstanding achievement as the Director General Support at Headquarters Joint Operations Command.
Army	Lieutenant Colonel Shaun Edward Harding	For outstanding achievement as Project Director Land 19 Phase 7A, the Counter Rocket Artillery Mortar capability.
Army	Lieutenant Colonel Stephen John Jobson	For outstanding achievement as the Commanding Officer, 6th Aviation Regiment.
Army	Lieutenant Colonel David John Kelly	For outstanding achievement as Commanding Officer, 1st Field Regiment, the Royal Australian Artillery.
Army	Lieutenant Colonel Paul Timothy Landford	For outstanding achievement as the Commander, Combined Task Force 635 on Operation ANODE in the Solomon Islands from August 2010 to August 2011.
Army	Lieutenant Colonel Eamon Patrick Lenaghan	For outstanding achievement as the Staff Officer Grade One, The Army Plan in Army Headquarters.
Army	Lieutenant Colonel M—	For outstanding achievement in senior staff positions at Headquarters Joint Operations Command.
Army	Lieutenant Colonel Luke Cameron Martin CSM	For outstanding achievement as the Deputy Director Strategic Logistics Development, Strategic Logistics Branch, Joint Logistics Command.
Army	Lieutenant Colonel Glenn James Ryan	For outstanding achievement as the Brigade Major, 1st Brigade.
Army	Colonel Simon John Tuckerman	For outstanding achievement as the Acting Director General Strategic Logistics and Director Logistics Information Systems, Strategic Logistics Branch, Joint Logistics Command.
Air Force	Squadron Leader Andrew Bryan Hoffmann	For outstanding achievement as the Targeting Flight Commander at Number 87 Squadron.
Air Force	Sergeant Gary Patrick Kilday	For outstanding achievement as a Combat Controller at Number 4 Squadron.
Air Force	Wing Commander Dean Michael Ransom	For outstanding achievement as a Capability Management Staff Officer for Surveillance and Response Group.

== Bar to the Conspicuous Service Medal ==
Branch	Recipient	Citation
Army	Warrant Officer Class One Bruce Paterson CSM	For meritorious devotion to duty as the Development Warrant Officer in the Land 121 Capability Implementation Team.

== Conspicuous Service Medal (CSM) ==
Branch	Recipient	Citation
Navy	Chief Petty Officer Stephen Brett Doughty	For meritorious achievement as the Senior Technical Officer at Defence Communications Station Sydney.
Navy	Warrant Officer Paul Andrew Fawbert	For meritorious devotion to duty as the Ship's Warrant Officer, HMAS Melbourne.
Navy	Lieutenant Commander Steven Barry Ford	For meritorious achievement as the Weapons Electrical Engineer in HMAS Perth during the Anti-Ship Missile Defence upgrade.
Navy	Petty Officer Bryce Jackson	For meritorious devotion to duty in the Australian Submarine Force.
Navy	Chief Petty Officer Glenn Alan Lee	For meritorious devotion to duty as the Boarding Officer in ARDENT TWO.
Navy	Commander Peter John Mingay	For meritorious devotion to duty as the Adelaide Class Frigate Capability Support Manager.
Navy	Leading Seaman Deanna Maree Pringle	For meritorious achievement aboard HMAS Pirie in the application of exceptional skills in providing assistance to survivors of a vessel that foundered on the rocks at Christmas Island on 15 December 2010.
Army	Warrant Officer Class Two Stuart James Baker	For meritorious achievement as the Senior Instructor and Acting Second-in-Command, Army Adventurous Training Wing.
Army	Warrant Officer Class Two Timothy John Bell	For meritorious achievement in Specialist Intelligence Training at the Defence Intelligence Training Centre.
Army	Warrant Officer Class Two D	For meritorious service in leadership and training roles.
Army	Warrant Officer Class One Paul Christopher Gibbs	For meritorious achievement as the Regimental Artificer Sergeant Major of the 2nd Cavalry Regiment.
Army	Warrant Officer Class One K—	For meritorious devotion to duty.
Army	Major Michael John Kearns	For meritorious achievement as an Instructor, Officer Commanding, Adjutant and Acting Second-in-Command at the Royal Military College, Duntroon.
Army	Captain Brett Douglas Pates OAM	For meritorious devotion to duty as the Regimental Sergeant Major Ceremonial – Army.
Army	Major Roger Harry Pointon	For meritorious devotion to duty in executive positions at Headquarters 1st Division.
Army	Major Derek Scott Snipe	For meritorious achievement as Officer Commanding Supply Wing, Army School of Ordnance, at the Army Logistic Training Centre.
Air Force	Flight Sergeant Tony Benfer	For meritorious devotion to duty in leading the Physical Training Section at Royal Australian Air Force Base Wagga, and for service to disabled sport.
Air Force	Warrant Officer David Kenneth Coles	For meritorious achievement as the Maintenance Training Flight Commander at Number 292 Squadron.
Air Force	Flight Sergeant Jason Andrew Morrison	For meritorious achievement as the Maintenance Training Flight Commander at Number 292 Squadron.
Air Force	Corporal Brendan Scott Smith	For meritorious achievement as the Unit Maintenance Training Non-Commissioned Officer at Number 92 Wing Development Flight.
Air Force	Warrant Officer Craig Francis Thomas	For meritorious achievement as Warrant Officer Engineering at Number 2 Operational Conversion Unit.
