= 1989 New Year Honours (Australia) =

The New Year Honours 1989 were appointments by Queen Elizabeth II to various orders and honours to reward and highlight good works by citizens of those countries, and honorary ones to citizens of other countries. They were announced on 31 December 1988 to celebrate the year passed and mark the beginning of 1989 in Australia.

The recipients of honours are displayed here as they were styled before their new honour, and arranged by honour, with classes (Knight, Knight Grand Cross, etc.) and then divisions (Military, Civil, etc.) as appropriate.

== Knight Bachelor ==
State of Queensland

- Robert Henry Norman, O.B.E. For services to the community.

== Order of the Bath ==
=== Companion of the Order of the Bath (CB) ===
Civil Division

State of Queensland

- Wallis James Baker. For public service.

== Order of Saint Michael and Saint George ==
=== Companion of the Order of St Michael and St George (CMG) ===
State of Queensland

- Patrick Desmond Rowley. For services to the dairying industry.

== Order of the British Empire ==
=== Commander of the Order of the British Empire (CBE) ===
Civil Division

State of Queensland

- Hugh David Sawrey. For services to Art.

State of Tasmania

- Lloyd John Harris. For services to the community.

=== Officer of the Order of the British Empire (OBE) ===
Civil Division

State of Queensland

- Raymond George Hope. For services to the community.
- Jack Owen Manton. For services to the arts.
- Dr. Thomas Julian Murphy. For services to the community.
- Keith Henry McDonald. For services to the press and to the community.

State of Tasmania

- Kenneth Francis Lowrie. For services to the community.

=== Member of the Order of the British Empire (MBE) ===
Civil Division

State of Queensland

- Dr. William Derek Domville Cooke. For services to medicine.
- Gladys Marie Elliott. For services to the community.
- Barry Leslie Ferber. For services to the community.
- Desmond Terence Foster. For services to golf.
- Dr. Pamela Mary Jackson. For services to the community.
- Arthur Neil Lewis. For services to audiology.
- Daphne Mary Pirie. For services to sport.
- Robert Ian Templeton. For services to sport.

State of Tasmania

- Peter Doyle. For services to the community.
- Thomas Arthur Gardner. For services to the community.

== Companion of the Imperial Service Order (ISO) ==
State of Tasmania

- June Marjorie Smith. For public service.

== British Empire Medal (BEM) ==
Civil Division

State of Queensland

- Myra Rose Blanch. For services to the community.
- William Brace. For services to the community.
- Hazel Culverhouse. For services to the community.
- Stanley Brian Dorey. For services to the community.
- Wendy Elizabeth Giddens. For services to World Expo 88.
- Eric Merton Johnston. For services to the dairying industry.
- Myra Ruby Jones. For services to the community.
- Merle Kate Kelly. For services to the community.
- Neville Kirk. For services to the cattle breeding industry.
- Kathleen Maria McCart. For services to the community.
- Edward John Graham Owens. For services to the blind.
- Leslie Anderton Tait. For services to the community.
- Brian Alfred Wendt. For services to World Expo 88.

State of Tasmania

- Shena Campbell Bewglass. For services to nursing.
- Jeffery Molesworth Boyes. For services to yachting.
- Harold Wilson. For services to lifesaving.

== Queen's Fire Services Medal (QFSM) ==
State of Queensland

- Victor Matthew Horne, Chief Officer, Maroochy Fire Brigade Board.
