= Katherine Samaras =

Endocrinologist and obesity researcher

- Education: University of New South Wales (PhD)
- Scientific career
- Fields: endocrinology, obesity
- Workplaces: Garvan Institute of Medical Research; St Vincent's Clinic; University of New South Wales
- Thesis: The genetic versus environmental determinants of total and central abdominal adiposity (2000)

Katherine Samaras is a consultant physician and endocrinologist at St. Vincent's Clinic in Sydney, Australia and Theme Leader for Healthy Ageing Research at the Garvan Institute of Medical Research. She is also a Professor at the School of Clinical Medicine, University of New South Wales and Professor of Medicine, University of Notre Dame.

== Career ==
Samaras works in clinical care in endocrinology and metabolism, including diabetes, metabolism and obesity, thyroid conditions, polyendocrine metabolic ovarian syndrome (PMOS), osteoporosis, as well as adrenal and pituitary conditions. She is the clinical face for the campaign NSW Health’s "Make Healthy Normal". She is an editor of the open access obesity journal Frontiers in Endocrinology.

Samaras gave a TEDx talk on preventable conditions and health, "our most valuable public resource, which we should do everything to protect" titled "Starve to Survive", with 70 000 views on intermittent fasting. She describes obesity, diabetes, as based on the lifestyle, of reduced exercise, increased food consumption, and on genetic differences.

Samaras had over 140 publications, and an H index of 40, as at July 2019. She is also co-author of three books. With Ian N. Scobie she wrote Fast Facts: Diabetes Mellitus, now in its 5th edition. She also co-wrote two books with Garry Egger — Professor Trim's Quick Start weight-loss program for diabetes and blood sugar control and Professor Trim's Quick Start : the weight-loss program for new mothers and mothers-to-be — both published by Allen & Unwin.

== Obesity research ==
Samaras described the weight and seasonal changes. Global studies show people putting on weight when seasons change, and Samaras urged people in NSW not to fall for the same trap in a NSW Health publication in 2018. Obesity is a serious public health issue with one in two adults in NSW being overweight or obese.

Samaras stated, “The hibernation pattern of animals such as bears is well known but people don't always think about how their habits change too when temperatures drop”.

“The winter months cause changes to our internal biological clocks – our circadian rhythms – which affects how we sleep and when we wake, our metabolism, our desire to be outdoors and even perhaps our desire for richer foods.” She points out, “In the US, studies indicate people commonly put on 2–3 kg in autumn and winter. We don't have specific data on seasonal inactivity in Australia, but our experience is likely to be similar and for some people those small gains each year will accumulate.”

A 2019 article reported that genomic map revealed that "not all fat is created equal". Her study showed the first comprehensive genomic map that revealed unique features, which appear to ‘hard-wire’ different types of fat early in cell development.

== Archibald Prize ==
A portrait of Samaras was a finalist in the 2019 Archibald Prize, painted by Sinead Davies, who has been managed by endocrinologist Samaras for some years for a serious health issue. Davies described Samaras’s composure “‘Her composure, professionalism and humanity instantly impressed me,’ says Davies. ‘The sitting was done in her office, where she mostly consults, and where she has surrounded herself with objects that she loves, including an Asian folding screen featuring white flowers and a small bird. In feng shui, birds signify the arrival of good news and opportunities, and flowers indicate a love of nature.’”

== Awards and recognition ==
- 2019 — Samaras was awarded almost $2 million for a Boosting Dementia Research grant.
- 2013 — The HeAL Declaration (Healthy Active Lives) tabled in the House of Lords (UK) as part of the Royal College of Psychiatrists “Parity of Esteem” Presentation.
- 2013 — The HeAL Declaration (Healthy Active Lives) adopted by NSW Government.
- 2013 — EuroHeAL Declaration launched, Kortenburg (Belgium).
- 2013 — Invitee, Ministerial Summit, Parliament House 24 May 2013. National Summit on Physical in Mental Health: Addressing the premature death of people with mental illness.
- 2011 — NSW Health Awards Finalist, Award for Excellence in Mental Health.
- 2010 — Don Chisholm–GSK Clinical Fellowship.
- 2005 — NHMRC–Diabetes Australia RD Wright Fellowship /Career Development Award.
- 2001 — Diabetes Australia Fellowship, Royal Australasian College of Physicians.
