= Trevor Cairney =

Australian academic

Trevor H. Cairney is an Australian academic who is an adjunct professor of education at the University of New South Wales and president of the NSW Business Chamber. As an author, he has written widely on early learning, training, language acquisition and development. His work includes nine books and over 200 reports, articles, and book chapters collected by libraries. Cairney was awarded an Order of Australia Medal in 2012.

== Early life ==
Cairney was born in Newcastle, New South Wales. He is the son of a Scottish coalminer, who was also one of nine sons of a Scottish coalminer, from Caldercruix near Glasgow. He commenced a mechanical engineering trainee-ship at the BHP in Newcastle in 1971 but left in his first year to begin training as a teacher.

== Career ==
=== Education career ===
Cairney worked as a primary school teacher in New South Wales, Australia in 1972. He taught for 10 years in three schools across all primary grades. This included 3 years as the teacher-in-charge of a one-room rural school.

Cairney worked for three years as a curriculum consultant for the NSW Department of Education. Throughout the 1970s and early 1980s he was enrolled in higher education, undertaking varied degrees, full-time, part-time or by external studies at the University of New England and the University of Newcastle. He completed an arts degree, a master's degree and then a PhD in Cognitive Psychology). Following his completion of his PhD in 1984 he was a postdoctoral fellow at Indiana University.

=== Postgraduate career ===
In 1981 he was employed at Charles Sturt University (Bathurst) teaching English Language and special education. He has worked at several other universities conducting research, teaching and filling other posts. These have included positions in universities as professor, head of various research centers, dean of an education faculty and pro vice-chancellor (research) at the University of Western Sydney (1989–2002).

In 2002 he was appointed as the master and CEO of New College, an independent Anglican residential college at the University of New South Wales in Sydney. In the same year Prof Cairney established The Centre for Christian Apologetics, Scholarship and Education (CASE) out of New College. In 2006 he initiated the development of New College Village (NCV), a postgraduate building, which opened in January 2009. He held this role until November 2016. He has held an adjunct professorship in the School of Education at UNSW since 2002, where he conducts research and scholarship and where he supervises postgraduate students. He is also an Honorary Professor in Education at the University of Sydney where he supervises PhD students.

=== Business career ===
Cairney was appointed as director of the Sydney Business Chamber in 1997 and then president (2001–2009). He initiated a merger between Sydney Business Chamber and Australian Business Limited (ABL). He was appointed as a director of NSW Business Chamber in 2006 and president in 2015. He was appointed as a director to the Australian Chamber of Commerce and Industry in 2016 where he also chaired the Employment, Education & Training Committee.

Cairney is currently a Fellow on the World Research, Advisory and Education Team of MindChamps with a focus on education.

== Academic research and publications ==
Cairney's first research area was early language development with a particular interest in how children become literate, how families support this development, and how language and literacy is shaped within social settings and as an extension of relationships.

His second research area is regional development and began with undergraduate and postgraduate studies in urban, regional and economic geography. In the 1990s, while in management positions at the University of Western Sydney, he advocated for the university's involvement in the regional development of Greater Western Sydney (GWS). During this time he continued his language research situated primarily within families focussing on and their educational needs on the urban fringe of Sydney.
