= Liz Jones (theatre director) =

Australian theatre director

Liz Jones AO
- Born: Elizabeth May Jones; 1946 (age 79–80)
- Education: Australian National University
- Occupations: Theatre director; performer; artistic director; administrator
- Employer: La Mama Theatre

Elizabeth May Jones AO (born 1946), best known as Liz Jones, is an Australian theatre director and artistic director of La Mama Theatre in Melbourne.

== Career ==
Jones graduated from the Australian National University (ANU) in 1965 with a Bachelor of Arts degree. In 1996 ANU conferred on her an honorary doctorate of laws.

Jones joined La Mama Theatre in 1973 as a performer and administrator and acted in a number of productions. She took over from Betty Burstall as artistic director in late 1976 and remained in that role until 2023. In 1985 in an effort to redress gender balance, she found six women directors to workshop plays, half of them by women.

She won a Churchill Fellowship in 1999, enabling her to observe the cultural significance of theatre in the United Kingdom, Ireland, Germany, France, Spain and the USA.

Since the fire that destroyed the La Mama Theatre in Carlton in May 2018, Jones has been involved in fundraising. The theatre was rebuilt and re-opened in late 2021.

== Awards and recognition ==
Jones won the Facilitator's Prize at the 2000 Sidney Myer Performing Arts Awards and was inducted onto the Victorian Honour Roll of Women in 2002.

Jones was made an Officer of the Order of Australia in the 2012 Queen's Birthday Honours for "distinguished service to the performing arts as an artistic director, administrator and performer, to the promotion of Indigenous playwrights and actors, and to the community".

Jones won the Australia Council Award for Theatre in 2018. She was presented with the Sue Nattrass Award for lifelong achievement at the 2019 Helpmann Awards.

== Selected works ==
- Jones, Liz; Burstall, Betty; Garner, Helen (1988), La Mama: The story of a theatre, McPhee Gribble, ISBN 978-0-14-011548-2
- Jones, Liz, ed. (1997), The La Mama collection: Six plays for the 1990s, Currency Press, ISBN 978-0-86819-532-2
