= Rotary Oceania Medical Aid for Children =

Charity providing medical aid for children

- Founder: Barrie Cooper
- Purpose: Children’s medical care
- Location: Australia, New Zealand
- Region served: Oceania
- Product: Life-saving or dignity-restoring surgery for children from Oceania
- Owner: Rotary Districts of Australia and New Zealand
- Website: www.romac.org.au
- Formerly called: Rotary Overseas Medical Aid for Children (2002-2004), Reaching Overseas with Medical Aid for Children (2004-2007)

Rotary Oceania Medical Aid for Children (ROMAC) is a charity which provides treatment in Australia and New Zealand for children from countries in the Oceania region in the form of life-saving or dignity-restoring surgery not accessible to them in their home countries. It is an organisation established in collaboration with Australian and New Zealand Rotary Clubs. Rotarians raise funds and provide voluntary work for ROMAC.

== History ==
In 1988, Barrie Cooper, a Rotarian from Bendigo, Australia, went on a humanitarian visit to Fiji and found the local surgical facilities inadequate for treating children. He had the idea of getting his Rotary club to sponsor children from Oceania to be brought to Australia to be treated by Australian surgeons. Other Rotary clubs subsequently joined in, followed by clubs in New Zealand. ROMAC became an Australian public company registered as a charity with deductible-gift-recipient status in 2002. Former test cricketer Max Walker was the patron of ROMAC up to this death in 2016 and did much to promote the organization.

== Services provided by ROMAC ==
A doctor in one of the Oceania countries can refer a child to ROMAC. However, referrals can come from Australian or New Zealand medical personnel who have gone to an Oceania location to do some voluntary medical work and come across a patient who could not be treated locally. The surgical intervention must not be available locally, has to be life-saving or dignity-restoring, the cost is affordable, and no long-term care of the patient is needed. ROMAC organises and pays for visas, passports, accommodation, hospital costs and clothing, while offering pastoral care in the form of emotional and practical support. Rotarians volunteer to accommodate the child (when it is not in hospital) and the accompanying family member. ROMAC also provides interpreters when needed.

ROMAC has a memorandum of understanding with some major hospitals to provide free care for a number of children. Due to the COVID-19 pandemic, the program of bringing children to Australia and New Zealand was halted in 2020.

As of 2025, ROMAC had assisted over 570 patients under the age of 15.

== Key people ==
Chairman of the Board: Glenys Parton

Patrons: Max Walker (until 2016, now deceased), Past Rotary International President Bill Boyd (until January 2025, now deceased)
