= Geoffrey Donnan =

Australian neurologist

Geoffrey Alan Donnan AO is an Australian neurologist. He was named an Officer of the Order of Australia in 2012 "for distinguished service to neurology as a clinician and academic leader, and through international contributions to research, particularly in the prevention and treatment of stroke." He also received the William M. Feinberg Award for Excellence in Clinical Stroke and Johann Jacob Wepfer Award for their work in the field of stroke research at the European Stroke Conference.
