= Sandra Sdraulig =

- Born: November 13, 1963 (age 63); Melbourne
- Education: BA, LL.B.
- Alma mater: Toorak College; Monash University
- Occupation: Executive coach
- Writing career
- Language: English
- Years active: 1988-
- Notable awards: Order of Australia (AM)
- Website: sandrasdraulig.com

Sandra Sdraulig, AM (born 13 November 1963) is an executive coach and owner of Through the Roof offering executive coaching specifically tailored for women. She is also the chairman of the Adelaide Film Festival, chair of the Adelaide Festival of Ideas, a board member of both the Adelaide Festival of the Arts and the South Australian Art Gallery, a former creative and executive director of the Melbourne International Film Festival, and a former chief executive of Film Victoria. In 2012, she was awarded an Order of Australia (AM) for leadership in film and TV.

== Early life ==
Sandra Sdraulig is the daughter of Giulio Sdraulig and Irene Trusgnach. She was born in Melbourne on 13 November 1963. After studies at Toorak College and Monash University she earned a Bachelor of Arts, with a major in Film Studies, and a Bachelor of Law. She has been admitted to practice in the Supreme Court of Victoria.

== Career ==
Sdraulig was the distribution manager for the Australian Film Institute from 1988 to 1992.

She was the film distribution & marketing manager for Palace Entertainment from 1992 to 1996.

Sdraulig was the creative and executive director of the Melbourne International Film Festival from 1996 to 2000. During Sdraulig's term as the Director of Melbourne International Film Festival the Festival experienced a "staggering phase of expansion. Admissions soared from 55,000 in 1997 to 140,000 in 2000, box office earnings jumped 167%, and total cash in kind sponsorship syrocketed 333%" as reported on How the Golden Fest was Won by Lawrie Zion in The Weekend Australian, 17–18 July 2004.

She directed the 1997, 1998, 1999, and 2000 Festivals.

She became CEO of Film Victoria in 2002 and held that position until 2011.

Sdraulig was a board member with the Art Gallery of South Australia from 2008 to 2014.

From 2011 to 2013, Sdraulig was the host and interviewer of radio show, Friday On My Mind, a program of Australian Film, Television and Radio School. The weekly program was held at the Australian Centre for the Moving Image, Federation Square, where practitioners across film, television, new media, and the performing arts discussed their work and ideas.

She has been chair of the Adelaide Festival of Ideas since 2012.

She is an executive coach with Through the Roof.

Sdraulig was appointed chairman of the Adelaide Film Festival in 2015, replacing Cheryl Bart.

== Controversy ==
During Sdraulig's time at Film Victoria, Victoria secured unprecedented levels of production. Sydney based companies and projects controversially moved to Melbourne with producers claiming that they were spurred by Victorian government funding and infrastructure which got behind its producers.

The feature film The Tender Hook described as an iconic Sydney period drama, based on some of Sydney's more colourful identities, was shot entirely in Melbourne.

Key Sydney based producers and businesses started relocating to Melbourne.

Crews and facilities were stretched to a limit with some productions relying on interstate crews to meet demand. The boom was the result of Film Victoria's aggressive marketing of Melbourne as a film destination as well as extensive development work of local projects.

Despite the fact that, during her leadership of Film Victoria, annual film production in that state increased from $90 million to over $260 million, the eight-year tenure ended in controversy when it was revealed that her send-off party, organised by the Board cost $45,000. Almost $30,000 went on food and wine, and over $10,000 on a surprise "Tribute DVD" by the industry for Ms Sdraulig. Sdraulig was not involved in the organisation of her farewell nor has that ever been claimed.

Producer Robert Galinsky wrote that after having brought "millions of dollars and tens of thousands of jobs into the state during her tenure that to complain about a farewell party after a decade of tireless effort was a shameless act".
