= Aunty Ruth Simms =

Aunty Ruth Simms AM was an Indigenous Australian elder (Yuin) and educator. She was the longest-serving Aboriginal education officer in the NSW Department of Education, and in 2012 was appointed a Member the Order of Australia for her contributions to Aboriginal education.

== Biography ==
Simms was born at La Perouse in Sydney in 1941.

She wrote Muttonfish Magic with co-author Lucy Robertson. The picture book was illustrated by Jasmine Seymour and published by Magabala Books in February 2026.

She died in October 2026.
