= Graeme Hugo =

Australian demographer, academic, and geographer

Graeme John Hugo AO (5 December 1946 – 20 January 2015) was an Australian demographer, academic, and geographer. Hugo, a professor of geography at University of Adelaide, was considered one of Australia's leading demographers. He served as the director of the Australian Migration and Population Research Centre at the University of Adelaide. Some of his most recent studies focused on discrimination against job-seekers from non-English speaking families and backgrounds. He was elected a fellow of the Academy of the Social Sciences in Australia in 1987. In 2012, Hugo was honoured as an Officer of the Order of Australia for his work in population research.

Graeme Hugo died from a short illness on 20 January 2015, at the age of 68.
