= Daphne Pirie =

Australian athlete, hockey player, golfer, and sports administrator (1931–2022)

Daphne Pirie, MBE AO née Welch; (21 December 1931 – 1 April 2022) was an Australian athlete, hockey player, and golfer, and a sports administrator and world-ranked Masters Athlete.

In 1989, Pirie was awarded a Member of the Most Excellent Order of the British Empire for services to hockey. She was the first female vice-president of the Queensland Olympic Council and, in 2011, she received the International Olympic Committee Women and Sport trophy for Oceania.

In 2012, Pirie was named a Queensland Great on Queensland Day and was appointed an Officer of the Order of Australia for her services to sports administration, hockey and as an advocate for women and girls in sport.

Pirie was the founding president for Womensport Queensland and is an inductee in both the Queensland Sport Hall of Fame and Hockey Queensland Hall of Fame. She held life memberships with Hockey Australia, Women's Hockey Australia and Hockey Queensland and was a board member of the Queensland Academy of Sport and President of the Gold Coast Sporting Hall of Fame.
