= Garry Egger =

Australian author and academic on health

Garry Egger AM
- Born: 4 January 1947 (age 79); Cessnock, New South Wales, Australia
- Education: University of Sydney; University of Western Australia; University of Newcastle
- Occupations: Writer, educator
- Known for: Founder of Gutbusters

Garry Egger AM (born 4 January 1947) is an Australian academic and author, particularly recognized for his work in health promotion, preventive health and lifestyle medicine. He has authored more than 35 books — several that are used as textbooks at various universities — and over 130 peer-reviewed articles collectively garnering over 3600 citations, with significant contributions to areas such as weight management and chronic disease prevention. He is notably the founder of Gutbusters, a men's weight loss program.

== Early life and education ==
Egger was born in Cessnock and raised in a house on the sand dunes of Wamberal Beach on the NSW Central Coast. He graduated from Gosford High School in 1964 and moved to Newcastle in 1966 to study psychology. In 1979, the Egger family home dramatically collapsed into the sea amid a media frenzy. The collapse was attributed to coastal erosion, exacerbated by the council-approved construction of a nearby sea wall and apartment complex – a scenario that was later confirmed in court. However, the council was found not liable due to a lack of knowledge on coastal erosion at the time. Egger holds a PhD in behavioural biology and epidemiology from University of Western Australia (1972), a Master of Public Health from the University of Sydney (1979), and an honours degree in psychology from University of Newcastle (1969).

== Career ==
=== Tobacco control and anti-tobacco advertising ===
In the early stages of his career, Egger was instrumental in driving health promotion initiatives in tobacco control while working for the NSW Department of Health. Notably, he was a key contributor to the initial 'Quit. For Life' campaign in the late 1970s as part of the North Coast Healthy Lifestyle Program in New South Wales, which paved the way for widespread public education initiatives across Australia in the early 1980s. He also collaborated with advertising director John Bevins to produce impactful anti-tobacco advertising campaigns, one of the most notable being the 1985 “sponge-as-a-lung ad”.

=== The Fitness Leader Program ===
In 1981, Egger partnered with Nigel Champion to establish the Australian Council for Health, Physical Education and Recreation (ACHPER) Fitness Leader Program of courses. The courses were a significant part of the initial steps towards formalising the training and accreditation processes for fitness professionals in Australia. The program helped to ensure that those entering the fitness industry were qualified and equipped with the necessary knowledge and skills to provide safe and effective fitness services.

=== Gutbusters and weight management ===
In 1992, Egger founded Gutbusters, a men's weight loss program. The concept of the program was born and tested by Egger in partnership with the NSW Health Department two years earlier within BHP, Australia's largest steel company. Charged with understanding male health behaviour, Egger tailored a program addressing abdominal obesity, a conspicuous health risk. The program's success — at least in terms of profile rather than profitability — led to its acquisition by Weight Watchers Australia. However, over the course of the next eight years, the revenue from the program only accounted for 2-3% of what was being generated from Weight Watchers’ programs for women, leading to its discontinuation. In 1999, Egger along with co-authors Boyd Swinburn and Razza Fezeela published "Dissecting Obesogenic Environments: The Development and Application of a Framework for Identifying and Prioritizing Environmental Interventions for Obesity". In this seminal paper, Egger and his co-authors introduced a framework for evaluating and prioritizing environmental interventions in addressing obesity. The framework advocated for a systemic approach, recognizing the complex interplay of environmental factors contributing to the obesity epidemic. As of October 2023, the paper had garnered more than 1,500 citations placing it just outside to the top 100 most cited peer-reviewed publications in obesity research.

=== Lifestyle medicine and shared medical appointments ===
Egger has been instrumental in advancing the field of Lifestyle Medicine, both in Australia and globally, and has published several books on the topic. He was the lead among the founding members of the Australian Lifestyle Medicine Association (ALMA) in 2008 and has written and delivered many training programs in Lifestyle Medicine for physicians and allied health professionals across Australia and the Pacific. This included co-authoring the world’s first Master of Lifestyle Medicine degree at Southern Cross University in 2008. Also in 2008, Egger was appointed Professor of Lifestyle Medicine and Applied Health Promotion at Southern Cross University, where he currently holds an adjunct Professorship.

Since 2014, Egger has been a prominent advocate for shared medical appointments (SMAs), promoting them as an innovative approach to healthcare management where individuals with similar concerns receive medical care and education simultaneously through group consultations. Recognizing the limited success of conventional 1:1 models of medical consultation and group education, Egger and academic colleague John Stevens have undertaken pioneering research in the integration of SMAs in primary health care practice in Australia as an effective alternative for addressing chronic diseases and improving health outcomes.

Through his work in primary care centres, Egger expanded the concept of SMAs into a more structured form known as programmed SMAs (pSMAs). These pSMAs involve a sequence of SMAs with a semi-structured format, providing targeted educational input on specific health topics. With a strong emphasis on lifestyle medicine, Egger has championed the use of pSMAs as a platform for a range of interventions in the management of chronic diseases and conditions. One notable application of pSMAs that Egger has spearheaded is in the use of pSMAs for weight management, type 2 diabetes prevention, chronic pain self-management and first nations people’s health in primary healthcare (PHC) centres with collaboration from general practitioners (GPs).

== Awards and recognition ==
In 2012, Egger was awarded the distinction of Member in the Order of Australia (AM) for his "service to medical education as an administrator and teacher, particularly in the area of health promotion and research, as an author, and for his contributions to professional organisations." Egger was awarded the Australasian Society of Lifestyle Medicine’s inaugural Pioneers of Lifestyle Medicine Award in 2020, the society’s highest honor.
