= 2019 Australia Day Honours =

The 2019 Australia Day Honours are appointments to various orders and honours to recognise and reward good works by Australian citizens. The list was announced on 26 January 2019 by the Governor General of Australia, Sir Peter Cosgrove.

The Australia Day Honours are the first of the two major annual honours lists, the first announced to coincide with Australia Day (26 January), with the other being the Queen's Birthday Honours, which are announced on the second Monday in June.

== Order of Australia ==
Order of Australia civil ribbon

Order of Australia military ribbon

=== Companion of the Order of Australia (AC) ===
==== General Division ====
- Peter Robert Botten, CBE – For eminent service to Australia-Papua New Guinea relations, particularly in the oil and gas industry, and to social and economic initiatives.
- Jillian Broadbent, AO – For eminent service to corporate, financial, clean energy and cultural organisations, to higher education, and to women in business.
- Dr Elizabeth Salisbury Dennis – For eminent service to science as a researcher and academic in the area of genomics and plant development, and to professional organisations.
- Roy Emerson – For eminent service to tennis as a player at the national and international level, to the promotion of the sport, and as an inspiration to young sportspersons.
- Professor Rhonda Galbally, AO – For eminent service to the advancement of social equity, particularly to the health and welfare of people with a disability, and to the community.
- Pauline Gandel – For eminent service to the community through humanitarian, philanthropic and fundraising endeavours, to social inclusion, and to Australia-Japan relations.
- Carrillo Gantner, AO – For eminent service to the community through professional involvement in, and philanthropic support for, the performing and visual arts, and to Australia-Asia cultural exchange.
- The Hon. Justice Michelle Gordon – For eminent service to the judiciary, and to the law, to legal education and judicial administration, as a role model, and to the community.
- David Martin Hoare – For eminent service to the finance and business sectors, to the telecommunications industry, to education, and to health and cultural organisations.
- Professor Peter Høj – For eminent service to higher education and to science, particularly to the commercialisation of research, and to policy development and reform.
- Emeritus Professor Richard Larkins, AO – For eminent service to medicine and medical research, to education through academic leadership, to public health care, and to the community.
- The Hon. Justice Geoffrey Nettle – For eminent service to the judiciary, and to the law, to criminal and civil appeals reform, to legal education, and to professional standards.
- Olivia Newton-John, AO, OBE – For eminent service to community health, particularly for people living with cancer, through support for medical research, and as a songwriter and performer.
- Professor Kathryn Nance North, AM – For eminent service to genomic medicine nationally and internationally, to medical research in the fields of genetics, neurology and child health, and as a mentor and role model.
- The late Stan Perron, AM – For eminent service to the community through philanthropic contributions to a range of charitable organisations, and to the commercial property sector.
- Jennifer Rowe – For eminent service to literature as an author, particularly in the children's fiction and adult mystery genres.
- The late Emeritus Professor Patrick Troy, AO – For eminent service to urban and regional planning, to environmental sustainability and social justice policy, and as a mentor and role model.
- The Hon. Warren Truss – For eminent service to the Parliament of Australia, particularly in the areas of trade, transport, agriculture, and rural and regional development.
- Helen Rodda Williams, AO – For eminent service to public administration through senior advisory roles, and to policy reform and innovative program delivery.

=== Officer of the Order of Australia (AO) ===
==== General Division ====
- John King Atkins — For distinguished service to the business and financial sectors, to the legal profession, and to the community.
- Professor David Lee Ball — For distinguished service to medicine in the field of radiation oncology, to medical education, and to professional bodies.
- Muriel Pauline Bamblett, AM — For distinguished service to the Indigenous community of Victoria as an advocate for the self-determination and cultural rights of children.
- Malcolm William Broomhead — For distinguished service to business and mining, and through financial support for education and medical research.
- Anna Elizabeth Burke — For distinguished service to the Parliament of Australia, particularly as Speaker of the House of Representatives, and to the community.
- Kathryn Jane Campbell, CSC — For distinguished service to public administration through senior roles with government departments, and to the Australian Army Reserve.
- Professor Donald Roderick Chalmers — For distinguished service to education, particularly to health law and medical research ethics, and to legal reform.
- Professor Helen Christensen — For distinguished service to medical research through the development of on-line mental health treatment programs.
- Philip Marcus Clark, AM — For distinguished service to education, to research and infrastructure investment, and to the not-for-profit sector.
- The Hon. Justice Jennifer Ann Coate — For distinguished service to the law, and to the judiciary, to legal administration, and to child and youth justice.
- Margaret Anne Cook — For distinguished service to the international community through the promotion of democratic electoral systems, and to human rights.
- Simon John Costa — For distinguished service to the international community through the delivery of humanitarian food programs, and to business.
- Barry Francis Coulter — For distinguished service to the government and the community of the Northern Territory, and to business.
- Professor Mark Jonathan Dodgson — For distinguished service to education in the field of business innovation strategy, as a researcher, advisor and author.
- Professor Olaf Heino Drummer — For distinguished service to medicine in the field of forensic toxicology, to medical education, and to professional groups.
- Dr Ronald David Ekers — For distinguished service to science as a radio astronomer, to scientific education, and to international astronomical organisations.
- Professor Jane Rosamond Fisher — For distinguished service to medicine, particularly in the field of perinatal mental health, to women, and to the community.
- Stephen Charles Fitzgerald — For distinguished service to the investment management sector, to Australia-Europe business relations, and to cultural and environmental philanthropy.
- Michael Clifford Fitzpatrick — For distinguished service to Australian rules football through executive roles, to business, and to medical research.
- Mark Thomas Fraser, CVO, OAM — For distinguished service to the Crown as Official Secretary to the Governor-General, and to international relations.
- Professor Bevil Milton Glover — For distinguished service to tertiary education, to professional associations, and to cultural organisations.
- Richard Michael Haddock, AM — For distinguished service to the community, to charitable groups, to the Catholic Church in Australia, and to the finance sector.
- Professor Sandra Lee Harding — For distinguished service to education at the national and international level, and to the community of Queensland.
- Graeme Charles Head — For distinguished service to public administration, to diversity employment initiatives, and to environmental protection.
- The Hon. Paul Raymond Henderson — For distinguished service to the community of the Northern Territory, particularly as Chief Minister.
- Gary John Humphries — For distinguished service to the Parliament of Australia, and to the Legislative Assembly of the Australian Capital Territory.
- Ronni Kahn — For distinguished service to social welfare, particularly through the development and delivery of innovative programs.
- Elena Kats-Chernin — For distinguished service to the performing arts, particularly to music, as an orchestral, operatic and chamber music composer.
- Professor Bruce Ernest Kemp — For distinguished service to biomedical research, particularly to the study of protein phosphorylation.
- Emeritus Professor Brian Leslie Kennett — For distinguished service to the earth sciences as a leading academic and researcher, particularly in the field of seismology.
- Dr Bronwyn King — For distinguished service to community health, particularly through advocacy for institutional investment strategies.
- Brian James Lacy — For distinguished service to the public administration of Australia's Indian Ocean territories, to industrial relations, and to the law.
- Professor Ross Raymond Large — For distinguished service to education, and to scientific research, in the field of economic geology, and to professional societies.
- Professor Daryl John Le Grew — For distinguished service to education, to research infrastructure development, and to architecture.
- Professor Sharon Ruth Lewin — For distinguished service to medical research, and to education, in the field of infectious diseases, particularly HIV/AIDS.
- Janet Osborn Limb — For distinguished service to the community through philanthropic support for charitable, social welfare, and medical research groups.
- Emeritus Professor Harold Luntz — For distinguished service to legal education, as an academic and editor, to professional development, and to the community.
- Professor Catriona Ann McLean — For distinguished service to medicine in the field of academic and clinical neuropathology, and as a role model and mentor.
- Professor John James McNeil, AM — For distinguished service to medicine in the fields of clinical epidemiology and cardiovascular research, and to public health.
- Ann Gabrielle Madden — For distinguished service to community health, as an advocate for the disadvantaged, to policy development, and to human rights.
- Romilly Jane Madew — For distinguished service to the construction sector as a change agent and advocate for sustainable building practices.
- Banduk Mamburra Marika — For distinguished service to the visual arts, particularly to Indigenous printmaking and bark painting, and through cultural advisory roles.
- Susan Mary Maslin — For distinguished service to the Australian film industry as a producer, and through roles with professional bodies.
- Kylie Ann Minogue, OBE — For distinguished service to the performing arts as a national and international recording artist and entertainer.
- Christopher John Mitchell – For distinguished service to the print media through senior editorial roles, as a journalist, and to Indigenous education programs.
- Professor Kate Hilda Moore – For distinguished service to medicine, and to medical research, in the field of urogynaecology, and to professional groups.
- Emeritus Professor Trefor Owen Morgan – For distinguished service to medicine, and to medical research in the physiological sciences, particularly in relation to hypertension.
- Karl Douglas Morris – For distinguished service to the financial and stockbroking sectors, and to the community through a range of organisations.
- Thomas Charles Mould – For distinguished service to youth, particularly through charitable awards programs, and to public administration and education.
- Emeritus Professor John Edward Murtagh, AM – For distinguished service to medicine, and to medical education, in the field of general practice, and to professional groups.
- Anthony Basil Nutt – For distinguished service to parliament and politics at the state and national level, and as Federal Director of the Liberal Party of Australia.
- Debora Margaret Picone AM – For distinguished service to the community through the coordination of improvements to the safety and quality of health care.
- Professor Andrew John Pitman – For distinguished service to science as a leading researcher, particularly of climate systems and the environment.
- Andrew Robert Pridham – For distinguished service to the investment banking and asset management sector, to sporting groups, and to philanthropy.
- Associate Professor Beverley Jane Rowbotham – For distinguished service to medicine through roles with professional associations, to pathology, and to medical education.
- Professor Elaine Margaret Sadler – For distinguished service to science as an astrophysicist, in the field of galaxy evolution, and to gender equality.
- Professor Peter Robert Schofield – For distinguished service to medical and scientific research in the field of neuroscience, and to professional institutes.
- Jillian Shirley Segal, AM – For distinguished service to the banking and financial regulation sectors, to not-for-profit organisations, and to women.
- Kevin John Sheedy, AM – For distinguished service to Australian rules football as a senior coach, and to education and employment programs for young people.
- The Honourable Warwick Leslie Smith, AM – For distinguished service to Australia-China business and financial relations, to education, and to the community.
- The Honourable Margaret Ackary Stone – For distinguished service to public administration, particularly to national security, to the judiciary, and to legal education.
- Lyn Mary Swinburne, AM – For distinguished service to women's health through advocacy roles, to public health governance, and to the community of Melbourne.
- Magdalene Mary Szubanski – For distinguished service to the performing arts as an actor, comedian and writer, and as a campaigner for marriage equality.
- Robert Bain Thomas, AM – For distinguished service to the State Library of New South Wales, to business, and to the financial services sector.
- Dawn Leonie Thorp – For distinguished service to nursing, and to medicine, in the field of haematology, as an expert clinician and mentor.
- Peter John Treseder, AM – For distinguished service to the community through governance and fundraising roles in the medical research and health care sectors.
- Michael James Ullmer – For distinguished service to the performing and visual arts through a range of roles, and to the finance and banking industry.
- Peter John Verwer – For distinguished service to the property sector, to sustainable development and construction, and to professional bodies.
- Professor Melanie Ann Wakefield – For distinguished service to medical research in the fields of population health and cancer prevention, and as a mentor.
- Rex Stephen Wild, QC – For distinguished service to the law, particularly to criminal litigation and inquiry, and to the community of the Northern Territory.
- Charles Garrard Woodard – For distinguished service to international relations, particularly to Australia-Asia foreign policy, as a researcher, author and diplomat.

==== Military Division ====
Army

- Major General Stephen Hugh Porter, AM – For distinguished service to the Australian Army and transformation of the Army Reserve through his significant contributions as the Commander 2nd Division

=== Member of the Order of Australia (AM) ===
==== General Division ====
- Joseph Aarons, OAM – For significant service to lawn bowls, particularly at the national and international level.
- Dr Sanchia Kaye Aranda – For significant service to community health, particularly to cancer control and nursing.
- Dr Wilfred Louis Armarego – For significant service to biochemistry and molecular biology.
- Professor Carol Lyn Armour – For significant service to medical education, and to asthma management.
- Dr Livingston Armytage – For significant service to civil justice, nationally and internationally.
- Christopher Arnold – For significant service to community health through medical research organisations.
- Emeritus Professor Valerie Judith Atkinson – For significant service to the Indigenous community, to education, and to mental health.
- Professor Robert Cornelis Augusteyn – For significant service to vision science and eye health research.
- Dr Bronte Francis Ayres – For significant service to children's charities, and to medicine as a cardiologist.
- Jennifer Mary Ball – For significant service to physiotherapy, and through volunteer clinical and teaching roles.
- Emeritus Professor Joanna Mary Barker – For significant service to medicine, and to medical education, particularly to occupational therapy.
- Dr Richard Arthur Barnett – For significant service to medicine through plastic and reconstructive surgery.
- John Windsor Barrington – For significant service to the community of Western Australia.
- Deborah Anne Beale – For significant service to the business and public sectors, and to the community of Victoria.
- Jan Maree Becker – For service to community health through neonatal organisations, and to aviation.
- Emeritus Professor Sharon Joy Bell – For significant service to tertiary education, and as an advocate for gender equity.
- Professor John Francis Beltrame – For significant service to cardiovascular medicine, and to medical research and education.
- Dr Cindy Louise Bennett – For significant service to the performing arts, particularly to music, and to the Indigenous community.
- Elleni Bereded-Samuel – For significant service to social welfare, and to the African community of Melbourne.
- Dr Julie-Ann Bernhardt – For significant service to medical research, and as an advocate for women in science.
- Peter Ernest Bicknell – For significant service to social welfare, and to the community of South Australia.
- Dr Werner Hans Bischof – For significant service to dentistry, and to professional dental organisations.
- Alan Robert Bishop – For significant service to the insurance industry, and to the community.
- Professor Francis Robert Bongiorno – For significant service to tertiary education in the field of history.
- Professor Tara Brabazon – For significant service to education, particularly to graduate and cultural studies.
- Felicity Jane Bradshaw – For significant service to the biological sciences, and to education.
- Dr Penelope Anne Briscoe – For significant service to medicine and medical education, particularly to chronic pain management.
- Dr Alison Elizabeth Broinowski – For significant service to international relations as an academic, author, and diplomat.
- Dr Andrew James Brooks – For significant service to medicine, and to medical education, in the fields of urology and oncology.
- Desmond Keith Brooks – For significant service to architecture, particularly in the Gold Coast region.
- Sally Elizabeth Browne – For significant service to the community through charitable organisations, and to the fashion industry.
- Dr Andrew James Browning – For significant service to the international community through the provision of obstetric care to women in Africa.
- Geoffrey Norman Brunsdon – For significant service to the finance, banking and insurance sectors, and to charitable organisations.
- Lesley Ann Brydon – For significant service to community health through the implementation of the National Pain Strategy.
- Dr Lester William Burgess – For significant service to international agricultural research in the areas of plant pathology and biosecurity.
- Dr David Collis Burke – For significant service to medicine, particularly to brain injury rehabilitation, and to professional medical bodies.
- Elizabeth Kay Butson – For significant service to youth through Guiding, and to the community of Western Australia.
- Mary Josephine Capps – For significant service to performing arts administration, particularly to music, and to business.
- Dr Jeanell Carrigan – For significant service to music education, particularly piano, and to the performing arts.
- Professor Anne Bernadette Chang – For significant service to paediatric respiratory medicine as a clinician and researcher.
- Jeffrey Robert Chapman – For significant service to the community through philanthropic initiatives.
- Susan Mary Chase – For significant service to business, development, and the community of South Australia.
- Dr Stephen Chen – For significant service to dentistry, to dental education, and to professional groups.
- Dr Nathan Isaac Cherny – For significant service to medicine, and to education, in the fields of palliative care and medical oncology.
- Lynette Chester – For significant service to community health, particularly to people living with dementia and their families.
- Ian Andrew Chesterman – For significant service to sports administration, particularly with the Australian Olympic Committee.
- Kitty Chiller – For significant service to sport, particularly as a modern pentathlon competitor and administrator.
- The Reverend Canon Dennis Peter Claughton – For significant service to the Anglican Church of Australia, and to the welfare of seafarers.
- Robyn Clubb – For significant service to primary industry, to agricultural societies, and to the community.
- Graham Brian Coates – For significant service to youth through Scouts at the state, national and international level.
- Dr Milton Laurence Cohen – For significant service to medical education in the field of pain management.
- Peter Louis Cohen, OAM – For significant service to hockey, and to the Jewish community of St Kilda.
- The Honourable John Allen Coldrey, QC – For significant service to the law, and to the judiciary, to legal reform, and to the community.
- Timothy John Coldwell – For significant service to the circus arts as a performer, designer, director and administrator.
- Michael John Cole – For significant service to the community of New South Wales through public funds management initiatives.
- Dr Allen James Coles – For significant service to sports and exercise science, and to the community.
- Dennis John Cometti – For significant service to the broadcast media as a sports presenter, and to the community.
- Timothy Peter Conolan – For significant service to community health, particularly to ill children and their families.
- David Mark Conry – For significant service to the community, to young people with high care needs, and to museums.
- Paul Steve Constantinou – For significant service to the accommodation and tourism sectors, and to the community.
- Dr Rodney Dean Cooter – For significant service to medicine, to plastic and reconstructive surgery, and to professional medical bodies.
- Janene Mary Cootes – For significant service to the community, particularly to the protection of the rights of people with a disability.
- Professor David Andrew Crawford – For significant service to science, education and research in the field of public health nutrition.
- The Honourable Justice Clyde Elliott Croft – For significant service to the law, and to the judiciary, particularly through commercial arbitration.
- Gary William Crooke, QC – For significant service to the law, to anti-crime and corruption authorities, and to legal standards.
- Terence Stanfield Cubley – For significant service to sports aviation, particularly to gliding as a competitor and administrator.
- Judith Anne Dalton – For significant service to tennis as a player, to equality for women in sport, and to sporting foundations.
- Emil Dan – For significant service to community health, to people with asthma and respiratory disease, and to pharmacy.
- Paul Davey – For significant service to parliament and politics as Federal Director of the National Party of Australia.
- Louise Davidson – For significant service to the superannuation and funds management sectors, and to breast cancer research.
- Dr Michael Joseph Davies – For significant service to medicine in the field of anaesthesia, and to professional medical bodies.
- Jeffrey Neil Davies – For significant service to the visual arts as an ornithological artist and illustrator.
- Lyndall De Marco – For significant service to youth development, to the tourism industry, and to the community.
- John Willem De Wijn, QC – For significant service to youth through Scouts, at the state and national level, and to taxation law.
- Sarkis Der Bedrossian – For significant service to the Armenian community in Australia through a range of roles.
- John Bernard Derum – For significant service to the performing arts as an actor, director and administrator, and to the community.
- Dr Ian Carnegie Dickinson – For significant service to orthopaedic medicine, and to professional medical organisations.
- Dr Ian Edwin Dickson – For significant service to higher education in the fields of chemistry and the information sciences.
- Dr Craig Edgar Donaldson – For significant service to medicine in the field of ophthalmology, and to professional eye health bodies.
- Barbara Lynette Dorsch – For significant service to physiotherapy as a clinician and educator, and to the community.
- Dr Katharine Jann Drummond – For significant service to medicine in the field of neuro-oncology, and to community health.
- Simon John Duffy – For significant service to wildlife conservation, and to the rehabilitation of primates in Africa.
- Dr Judith Margaret Dwyer – For significant service to education in the field of health care management, and to medical administration.
- Her Honour Judge Sylvia Ruth Emmett – For significant service to the law, to the judiciary, and to professional legal associations.
- Dr Angela Margaret Evans – For significant service to community health in the field of paediatric podiatry, and to professional standards.
- Emeritus Professor Gareth Evans – For significant service to science, and to education, in the field of animal reproductive biology.
- Jonathan Eric Faine – For significant service to the broadcast media as a radio presenter, to the law, and to the community.
- Pamela Fayle – For significant service to international relations through senior diplomatic roles, and to the community.
- Adele Ferguson – For significant service to the print and broadcast media as a journalist and business commentator.
- Robert Francis Finch – For significant service to squash through a range of administrative roles, and as a player.
- Dulcie Gladys Flower, OAM – For significant service to the Indigenous community, and to the 1967 Referendum Campaign.
- Katrina Mary Fong Lim – For significant service to local government, and to the community of the Northern Territory.
- Dr David Alan Forbes – For significant service to medicine in the field of paediatric gastroenterology.
- Susan Margaret Forrester – For significant service to business through governance and strategic roles, and as an advocate for women.
- The Honourable Patricia Forsythe – For significant service to business, and to the people and Parliament of New South Wales.
- Dr Graham Robert Forward – For significant service to the international community through medical initiatives in Africa.
- Chrissie Foster – For significant service to children, particularly as an advocate for those who have suffered sexual abuse.
- Deborah Anne Fracaro – For significant service to business, to Indigenous training initiatives, and to the community of the Northern Territory.
- Professor Mary Pauline Galea – For significant service to medical education in the field of clinical physiotherapy, and to professional associations.
- Dr Ian Douglas Galloway – For significant service to the museums sector, to historical preservation, and to the environment.
- Dr Paul John Garrahy – For significant service to medicine in the field of cardiology as a clinician, mentor, advocate and researcher.
- Professor Mary Jean Garson – For significant service to education, particularly to organic chemistry, and as an advocate for women in science.
- Robert Barry Gavshon – For significant service to education, to business, and to the Jewish community of New South Wales.
- Susan Jessica Giles – For significant service to the performing arts as an artistic director, and to theatre for children.
- Professor Afaf Girgis – For significant service to medicine, and to medical education, in the field of cancer control and psycho-oncology.
- Dennis John Goldner – For significant service to the community through charitable, health and cultural organisations.
- Sally Lisa Goldner – For significant service to the LGBTIQ community through advocacy roles, and to the broadcast media.
- Dr Joy Goodfellow – For significant service to early childhood education, to children with special needs, and to professional standards.
- Richard Alaster Gower – For significant service to the recreational and historical aviation sector through a range of roles.
- Noah David Grace, QC – For significant service to criminal law, and to the community through pro-bono contributions to sporting bodies.
- David William Gray – For significant service to veterans and their families through a range of executive roles.
- The Reverend Professor Emeritus Robert William Gribben – For significant service to the Uniting Church in Australia, to ecumenical relations and theological studies.
- David Carlyle Griffith – For significant service to business law, to intellectual property rights, and to professional standards.
- Professor John Anthony Griffiths – For significant service to music education as an academic and musicologist, and to professional societies.
- Lynette Noelle Grubwinkler – For significant service to international eye health initiatives as a clinical consultant, and to ophthalmic nursing.
- Professor Ronald Robert Grunstein – For significant service to medical education and research in the field of sleep disorders.
- Peeyush Kumar Gupta – For significant service to business, and to the community, through governance and philanthropic roles.
- Professor Paul Steven Haber – For significant service to medical education and research, particularly in the field of addiction medicine.
- Brian Gordon Hagger – For significant service to education, to independent schools, and to the community of South Australia.
- Professor Jeffrey Mark Hamdorf – For significant service to medical education, and to medicine, in the field of bariatric surgery.
- Raymond Richard Harding – For significant service to the broadcast media, particularly as a script writer and producer for television.
- Narelle Hargreaves, OAM – For significant service to children and young people in the Australian Capital Territory, and to education.
- Professor David Charles Harris – For significant service to medicine, and to medical education, in the field of nephrology, and to professional societies.
- Dr James Thomas Harvey – For significant service to technological engineering, particularly to microwave telecommunications design.
- Anthony John Hawkins – For significant service to public administration, particularly in the area of workers' compensation insurance.
- Karen Hayes – For significant service to the community as an advocate for gender equity, and to women in sport.
- William Paul Healy – For significant service to the community, particularly in the area of forensic mental health, and to education.
- Alicia Antoinette Hein – For significant service to the people of Thailand through social welfare initiatives, and to archaeological research.
- Dr Donald Lloyd Hein – For significant service to archaeological research, and to the people of Thailand through social welfare initiatives.
- Dr Margaret Elena Hellard – For significant service to medicine as an infectious diseases and public health physician and research scientist.
- Dr Adrian Donald Hibberd – For significant service to medicine, and to medical research, in the field of renal transplantation.
- Dr Carmel Judith Hillyard – For significant service to science, particularly in the area of medical biotechnology research, and to the community.
- Dr Ross Holland – For significant service to pharmacy practice, to medical education, and to professional organisations.
- Dr Raymond Eden Holmes – For significant service to surveying and mapping, and to professional organisations.
- The Honourable Barry John House – For significant service to the people and Parliament of Western Australia, and to the community of the South West.
- Anthony John Howard, QC – For significant service to the law, to the judiciary, to professional standards, and to the community of Victoria.
- Professor Jennifer Frances Hoy – For significant service to medicine, and to medical education, in the field of infectious diseases.
- Dr Harvey Ian Hunt – For significant service to emergency medicine, to medical administration, and to the community of Queensland.
- The Most Reverend Daniel Eugene Hurley – For significant service to the Catholic Church in Australia, and to the community of the Northern Territory.
- David Gordon Inglis – For significant service to the international community through humanitarian medical programs.
- Allan John Inwood – For significant service to surf lifesaving at the local, state and national level.
- Anita Jacoby – For significant service to the broadcast and print media, and to community mental health groups.
- Dr William Roy Johnson – For significant service to medicine in the field endocrinology, as an educator and mentor, and to surf lifesaving.
- Bruce Joseph Judd – For significant service to civil engineering, particularly to major transport infrastructure projects.
- Deborah Anne Karasinski – For significant service to people with a disability, and to the community of Western Australia.
- Grant William Kardachi – For significant service to pharmacy at the state and national level, and to professional societies.
- Professor Maria Kavallaris – For significant service to medicine, and to medical research, in the field of childhood and adult cancers.
- Peter Lloyd Kelly – For significant service to mechanical engineering through the development of innovative farm machinery.
- Daniel Matthew Kelly – For significant service to international humanitarian emergency response organisations.
- Professor Matthew Colm Kiernan – For significant service to medicine, and to medical education, in the field of neurology.
- Emeritus Professor Michael John Knight – For significant service to scientific education, particularly to hydrogeology and groundwater management.
- Alan Kohler – For significant service to the print and broadcast media as an editor, journalist and finance commentator.
- Vaclav George Kolsky, OAM – For significant service to youth through Scouting in a range of leadership roles, and to the community.
- Wayne Michael Kraft – For significant service to the community of the Northern Territory through a range of organisations.
- Professor Richard Krever – For significant service to legal education, to taxation law and policy reform, and through advisory roles.
- Dr Erin Lalor – For significant service to community health through not-for-profit organisations, and to people affected by stroke.
- Dr Paul Angus Lancaster – For significant service to community health, particularly to perinatal and paediatric medicine.
- Laurence Lancini – For significant service to rugby league football, and to the community of North Queensland.
- Professor John Vance Langmore – For significant service to the Parliament of Australia, to international relations and governance, and to education.
- Bruce Le Ber Langoulant – For significant service to community health as an advocate for meningitis awareness and prevention.
- Bruce Herbert Leaver – For significant service to conservation and heritage preservation, to public administration, and to the community.
- Alison Jean Lester – For significant service to literature as a children's author and illustrator, and to Indigenous literacy.
- The Honourable Kennon Richard Lewis – For significant service to the Parliament of Western Australia, and to the community.
- Karen Maree Livingstone – For significant service to community health as an advocate for ovarian cancer research.
- Michael John Logan – For significant service to primary industry through rural research and sustainable development programs.
- Joseph Leo Lukaitis, RFD – For significant service to the community through support for medical research and not-for-profit organisations.
- Angela Lynch – For significant service to the law, particularly to victims rights and the prevention of domestic violence.
- Graeme Bernard Lynch – For significant service to community health through a range of roles, and to the Tasmanian wine industry.
- Peter John Maguire – For significant service to local government, and to the community of the Queensland Central Highlands.
- Dr David Frederick Malin – For significant service to science as an astronomer and astrophotographer.
- Helen Marcou – For significant service to music, particularly as a promoter and advocate for live performance.
- Kenneth Allan Martin – For significant service to community safety through anti-crime initiatives.
- Anne Martin – For significant service to the Indigenous community, and to higher education.
- Elizabeth Anne Mason – For significant service to nursing, and to the community of the Northern Territory.
- Sophie Veronique Masson – For significant service to literature as an author and publisher, and through roles with industry organisations.
- Roger Brian Massy-Greene – For significant service to the community through philanthropic initiatives.
- Dr Peter Thomas McCawley – For significant service to the Asia-Pacific region through economic advisory roles.
- Julie Elizabeth McCrossin – For significant service to the community, particularly through LGBTIQ advocacy roles, and to the broadcast media.
- Thomas Harrington McGuire – For significant service to the tourism and hospitality industry, and to the community.
- Professor Jennifer Elaine McIntosh – For significant service to medicine, particularly child developmental psychology.
- Timothy James McKinnon – For significant service to the community of Moss Vale, and to international health programs.
- Jean McLean – For significant service to international relations, and to the Parliament of Victoria.
- Ian McLean – For significant service to music, particularly as a promoter and advocate for live performance.
- Peter Edwin McMaugh – For significant service to horticulture through the development of Australian turf varieties.
- John Menzies McMurtrie – For significant service to the community through philanthropic initiatives, and to the finance industry.
- Graeme Ross McPherson – For significant service to print and digital media, and to the community.
- Dr Donald Raymond McTaggart – For significant service to medicine as a cardiologist, and to the community of Launceston.
- John Stuart Menzies – For significant service to the tourism industry in Queensland.
- Sharon Lee Middleton – For significant service to road transport, particularly to the trucking industry.
- Stephen Alwyn Milgate – For significant service to medical professional associations, and to the community.
- Dr Andrew Miller – For significant service to medicine as a dermatologist, and to professional organisations.
- Professor Sarah Brooke Miller – For significant service to the performing arts through research, education and advisory roles.
- The Reverend Dr Robert Bradley Mitchell – For significant service to the community through charitable organisations, and to the Anglican Church of Australia.
- Catriona Jane Mordant – For significant service to the arts through a range of administrative and advisory roles.
- Bronwyn Kay Morris – For significant service to business through leadership and advisory roles.
- Dr Geraldine Michelle Moses – For significant service to medicine as a pharmacist, particularly through advisory and educational roles.
- Dr Garry Francis Nolan – For significant service to the community, and to the business sector.
- Arie Rein Nygh – For significant service to maritime transport through tugboat safety and standards initiatives.
- Natalie Anne O'Brien – For significant service to tourism and wine associations, and to the community of Victoria.
- Mark Arthur O'Brien – For significant service to conservation, and to the community of South West Queensland.
- Dr John Edward O'Hagan – For significant service to medical science and innovation, and to the community.
- Robert David O'Keeffe – For significant service to tourism and business in Queensland.
- Mark Anthony Orr – For significant service to community health through a range of initiatives.
- Pamela Lorraine Parker – For significant service to local government, and to the community of Logan.
- Rodrick John Parker – For significant service to community music through pipe and drum bands.
- Professor Paul Pavli – For significant service to medicine, to patient care, and as a researcher and mentor.
- Kevin William Perkins – For significant service to the visual arts as a timber craftsman, designer and sculptor.
- Professor Matthew John Peters – For significant service to thoracic medicine, to medical education, and to professional organisations.
- Dr Christopher John Pigram – For significant service to public administration, particularly through scientific leadership roles.
- John Saunders Pollock – For significant service to primary industry in Queensland through a range of roles.
- Garth Ivan Porter – For significant service to music as a performer, song-writer and producer.
- Emeritus Professor James Edward Pratley – For significant service to agricultural science through roles as an educator, researcher and adviser.
- Dr Kathleen Alice Price – For significant service to education, particularly through Indigenous teaching initiatives.
- Emeritus Professor Roger Stuart Pulvers – For significant service to Japanese literature and culture as a writer, translator and educator.
- Professor Karen Louise Quinlan – For significant service to the visual arts as an administrator and gallery curator, and to higher education.
- Nelune Bandara Rajapakse, OAM – For significant service to the community through fundraising and support programs for cancer patients.
- Professor Judy Agnes Raper – For significant service to higher education through a range of roles, and to engineering.
- Michael Anthony Reid – For significant service to the community through government and not-for-profit health roles, and to Indigenous welfare.
- The Honourable Peter Keaston Reith – For significant service to the Parliament of Australia, and to the community of Victoria.
- Dr Christine Roberta Richmond – For significant service to education, particularly through student behaviour management policies.
- Anthony Thomas Rinaudo – For significant service to conservation as a pioneer in international reforestation programs.
- Eric Joseph Roughana, OAM – For significant service to the Mount Gambier region, particularly through roles with community organisations.
- Professor Lynette Wendy Russell – For significant service to higher education, particularly Indigenous history, and to professional organisations.
- Professor Lyndall Ryan – For significant service to higher education, particularly to Indigenous history and women's studies.
- Randall Paul Sach – For significant service to medicine as a plastic surgeon, to international relations, and to professional organisations.
- Dr Nouria Sultana Salehi, OAM – For significant service to the Afghan, migrant, and refugee communities.
- Sime Sarin – For significant service to the fishing industry, to business, and to the community of Port Lincoln.
- Luke Frederick Sayers – For significant service to business, to people with a disability, and to the community.
- Uschi (Ursula) Schreiber – For significant service to business, to public administration, and as an advocate for gender equality.
- Brian Seidler – For significant service to the building and construction industry through professional organisations.
- The Reverend Dr Charles Henry Sherlock – For significant service to the Anglican Church of Australia, and to theological education.
- Jim Siderov – For significant service to oncology pharmacy as a clinician, and to professional associations.
- Lynette Silver, OAM – For significant service to the community through historical battlefield tours and commemorative services.
- Timothy James Sims – For significant service to the community through philanthropic initiatives.
- Professor Paul Edward Simshauser – For significant service to the energy sector through executive roles, applied economics and policy research.
- Paul Gregory Sinclair – For significant service to pharmacy, to the community, and to local government.
- Eva Desiree Skira – For significant service to business in Western Australia through a range of industry and advisory roles.
- Alexandra Mary Sloan – For significant service to the community of Canberra, and to the broadcast media as a radio presenter.
- Dr Simon Beavis Smith – For significant service to the law, particularly in consumer affairs, to higher education, and to history.
- Richard Smith – For significant service to the community through philanthropic initiatives.
- Professor Nicholas Charles Smith – For significant service to science as a parasitologist and immunologist, and to higher education.
- John William Smolders – For significant service to the building and construction industry, and to higher education.
- Professor Neil Allan Spike – For significant service to medical education, particularly to general practitioner standards and training.
- Vicki Lorraine Standish – For significant service to the community through philanthropic initiatives.
- Waverley Shane Stanley – For significant service to the Indigenous community through support for education.
- Senior Professor Julie Robyn Steele – For significant service to science in the field of biomechanics, to higher education, and to professional associations.
- Dr David Murray Stevens – For significant service to Australian naval history as a researcher and author.
- Graeme John Stickland – For significant service to youth through Scouts at the state and national level.
- Professor Sarah Elizabeth Strasser – For significant service to medical education, particularly to rural general practice.
- Reynah Manhoi Tang – For significant service to the law, particularly through professional legal associations.
- David Paul Thompson – For significant service to surf lifesaving at the local, national, and international level.
- Ian James Thorpe, OAM – For significant service to youth and Indigenous education through charitable initiatives, and to swimming.
- Geoffrey David Todd – For significant service to the visual arts as an artist and sculptor.
- Juan Ignacio Trapaga (Ignatius Jones) – For significant service to entertainment as a writer, director, author and performer.
- Professor Diane Esma Twigg – For significant service to nursing through a range of leadership, education and advisory roles.
- Allan Boyd Vidor – For significant service to the Jewish community, and to the hospitality industry.
- Dr Paul Vogel – For significant service to public administration through environmental leadership roles.
- Mary Therese Wagner – For significant service to the community of Toowoomba.
- Anthony Norman Wales – For significant service to the community through philanthropic and social welfare initiatives.
- Ian Baker Wall, OAM – For significant service to the community through philanthropic initiatives.
- Dr Bryan Geoffrey Walpole – For significant service to emergency medicine, to professional organisations, and to sailing.
- Andrew Mark Way – For significant service to medicine through administrative and advisory roles.
- William Alexander Webster – For significant service to the community through philanthropic and social welfare initiatives.
- Moira Therese Were – For significant service to the community of South Australia through a range of roles, and to social welfare.
- Roger Booth West – For significant service to the community through social welfare initiatives, and to the law.
- David Andrew Weston – For significant service to the community through a range of roles and initiatives.
- Professor David Carlisle Whiteman – For significant service to medical research in the field of cancer epidemiology.
- Professor David Charles Widdowson – For significant service to higher education in the field of international trade and customs.
- Dr Roger Konrad Wilkinson – For significant service to medicine as a cardiovascular surgeon, and to the community.
- Lynette Frances Williams – For significant service to the performing arts as an administrator and artistic director.
- Lyn Adrienne Williams, OAM – For significant service to the Indigenous community, and to youth, through choral music initiatives.
- Thomas Dorrien Wilmot – For significant service to civil engineering, particularly soil stabilisation and road recycling.
- Maria Louise Wilton – For significant service to the business and finance sector, and to the community.
- Stuart John Wood, QC – For significant service to the legal profession, particularly in the area of industrial relations.
- The Honourable Grant Allen Woodhams – For significant service to parliament and politics, and to the community of Western Australia.
- Dr Patricia Ann Woolley – For significant service to the environment through the conservation of Australian dasyurid marsupials.
- Jillian Eunice Wright – For significant service to gymnastics as a national selector and administrator, and international judge.
- The Honourable Peter Charles Young, QC – For significant service to the law and to the judiciary, to higher education, and to the horse racing industry.
- Professor Zhiguo Yuan – For significant service to science through urban water management, and to higher education.

==== Military Division ====
Navy

- Commodore Michael Hans Miko, RAN – For exceptional service to the Royal Australian Navy in the field of Maritime Logistics.
- Captain Ian James Young, RAN – For exceptional service in the delivery of operational medical services to the Australian Defence Force on Operations RELEX, PADANG ASSIST, RENDER SAFE, OKRA and SLIPPER.

Army

- Colonel Andrew Nicholas Abbott – For exceptional service as Commanding Officer School of Armour and Chief of Staff 1st Division/Deployable Joint Force Headquarters.
- Brigadier Scott Mervyn Benbow – For exceptional service in the field of Rotary Wing Aviation Capability Management.
- Colonel John Arthur Harvey – For exceptional service to the Australian Defence Force in legal capability development and structural reform.
- Brigadier Anthony John Rawlins, DSC – For exceptional service as the Director General Military Strategic Commitments and Commander 7th Combat Brigade.
- Brigadier David John Wainwright, DSC – For exceptional service in the appointments of Director General Special Operations Capability; Chief of Operations, Headquarters Resolute Support, Operation HIGHROAD; and Director General Future Land Warfare Branch, Army Headquarters.
- Colonel Andrew Michael Williams – For exceptional service as the Senior Health Officer Special Operations Command, Director Future Health Capability, Commanding Officer 2nd General Health Battalion and Director Army Health.

Air Force

- Group Captain Stuart James Bellingham, DSC, CSC – For exceptional service in Joint air – land terminal attack systems development; support to operations; and major airborne capability sustainment for the Australian Defence Force.
- Air Commodore Glen Edward Braz, CSC, DSM – For exceptional performance of duty in strategic capability enablement and air combat sustainment.
- Air Commodore Barbara Ann Courtney – For exceptional service in combat support unit operations, organisational reform, major international engagement, and strategic capability development for the Australian Defence Force.
- Group Captain Gregory Vincent Hampsons – For exceptional performance of duty in the development and sustainment of clinical aviation medical services in the Australian Defence Force.
- Air Commodore Gregory Alan Hoffmann, CSC – For exceptional service in aerospace acquisition and sustainment for the Australian Defence Force.

==== Honorary ====
- Dr Goetz Richter – For significant service to music as a concert violinist, artistic director, mentor and educator.
- Luan May (Mimi) Wong – For significant service to the community through a range of charitable initiatives.

=== Medal of the Order of Australia (OAM) ===
==== General Division ====
- Galila Abdelsalam — For service to the Islamic community through a range of organisations.
- Janice Maree Ablett — For service to the community through alcohol and drug dependence groups.
- The Honourable Dick Godfrey Adams — For service to the Parliaments of Australia and Tasmania, and to adult literacy
- Catherine Ann Adams — For service to the community through the Country Women's Association of New South Wales.
- Noel Edward Adsett — For service to the community through the Uniting Church in Australia.
- Dr Ian Lintern Airey — For service to the community through the Wesley Mission Queensland.
- Margaret Akins — For service to secondary education.
- Girolamo Marcello Alberti — For service to the community of Fremantle.
- Debbie Joy Alexander — For service to tourism, and to the community.
- Kenneth Bryant Algate — For service to people with a disability, and to the community.
- Dr Sonia Allan — For service to tertiary education, and to the law.
- Dr Adrian Mark Allen — For service to medicine, and to the community of Walcha.
- John Wyatt Allen — For service to the community of Mount Gambier.
- Peter Atholwood Allen — For service to the community through a range of organisations.
- Toby Charles Allen — For service to the performing arts as an entertainer.
- Dr Ahmad Alrubaie — For service to the Iraqi community of Sydney.
- Rhonda Ann Amos — For service to the Morpeth Uniting Church.
- Stephen Edward Anderson — For service to the air-conditioning and refrigeration industry through the development of environmental policy.
- Lorance Rogers Angus — For service to agricultural and show societies
- Stephen Anthony — For service to people with a disability and their families.
- Brenda Edwina Appleton — For service to the LGBTIQ community of Victoria.
- Peter Gerald Appleton — For service to the community of Kilmore.
- Dr Venny Gerald Armanno — For service to medicine, particularly in the field of general practice.
- Neil David Armstrong — For service to the community.
- Leslie Arnould — For service to veterans and their families.
- Ian James Arrell — For service to the community.
- Hana Assafiri — For service to women through a range of roles.
- Brian Keith Atkins — For service to the community through a range of organisations.
- June Hilary Atkinson Murray — For service to the Indigenous community of Victoria.
- Clifford Samuel Austen — For service to the sport of shooting.
- Gordon James Austin — For service to the community of the NSW Northern Rivers.
- Kenneth John Austin — For service to the community, and to Rotary.
- Brian Herbert Bailey — For service to the grain industry.
- Glenda Ivy Bailey — For service to the community of South Australia.
- Norman Lewis Bailey — For service to the performing arts.
- Lyle Harrison Baird — For service to cycling.
- Eugene Andrew Bajowski — For service to business, and to the Polish community.
- Gwennyth Alicia Baker — For service to community health.
- Claudia Barker — For service to the community through a range of musical organisations.
- Kenneth William Barker — For service to the community of Glen Innes.
- Angela Michelle Barker — For service to the community through social welfare organisations.
- The late Mrs Beryl Lorraine Bassett — For service to youth through Scouts.
- The Reverend Father Kevin Francis Bates — For service to the Catholic Church of Australia.
- Mary (Moo) Baulch — For service to community health.
- Zeljko Bedic — For service to the community and to the performing arts, particularly through music.
- Dr Beverley Jean Begg — For service to education.
- Ada Belcher — For service to the community through social welfare organisations.
- Robert Bender — For service to conservation and the environment, and to the community.
- Dr Tuan Bendixsen — For service to animal welfare in South East Asia.
- Barry Christopher Bennett — For service to the surfboard manufacturing industry, and to the community.
- Jannette Doreen Bent — For service to the community of the Blue Mountains.
- Susan Kathleen Bergman — For service to the performing arts, particularly through community theatre.
- Lynn Marie Berry — For service to veterans and the community through commemoration.
- Rachel Alamil Bessant — For service to children in the Philippines.
- Kenneth Albert Beven — For service to veterans and their families.
- Philip Bianchi — For service to community history.
- Patricia Elaine Bigham, AFSM — For service to the community of the Yarra Ranges.
- Maxwell Clifford Binnington — For service to athletics.
- Terence Grant Birtles — For service to the community through a range of roles.
- Julian Louis Black — For service to the Jewish community.
- Marilyn Meg Blake — For service to the community through healthcare fundraising.
- Frances Blake — For service to the community of Coffs Harbour.
- Michael Harvie Bleby — For service to the community.
- Ronald Sydney Blood — For service to veterans and their families.
- Brian Edward Bloxsom — For service to the real estate industry, and to the community.
- Gavin Iain Blue — For service to the community.
- The Honourable Michael Francis Board — For service to youth in Western Australia.
- Hayley Louise Bolding — For service to international relations through educational and business initiatives.
- Jennifer Margaret Bombardieri — For service to people with a disability through sport.
- Victor Robert Boreham — For service to the community.
- Dr Michael Murray Borten — For service to medicine as a proctologist.
- Dr Michael Joseph Bourke — For service to medicine.
- Brian John Bourke — For service to the community of Bendigo.
- Jennifer Susan Bowe — For service to the community of the NSW Southern Highlands.
- Glenys Fay Bowtell — For service to conservation and the environment.
- Carol Ann Boyle — For service to lawn bowls.
- Jane Ann Bradford — For service to the community.
- Susan Gai Bradley — For service to the community of the Kimberley.
- Graeme Kenneth Brady — For service to the community of Rockhampton.
- Gerard Anthony Brennan — For service to the community through a range of roles.
- The late Dr Neil Francis Bright — For service to medical education, and to the community of Albury Wodonga.
- Neil Richard Brock, AFSM — For service to the communities of Oxley and Milawa.
- Michael Kevin Brosnan — For service to the community through the not-for-profit sector.
- Mary Annette Brosnan — For service to the community, particularly as a church organist.
- Raymond Claude Brown — For service to local government, and the community.
- Geoffrey Gordon Brown — For service to the cotton industry, and to the community of Wee Waa.
- Gerald Ernest Brown — For service to the Indigenous community of the Illawarra.
- Maureen Barbara Brown — For service to the community of Sale.
- Shane Brown — For service to the community through social welfare organisations.
- John Murray Brown — For service to surf lifesaving.
- The Reverend Ronald Mark Browning— For service to the community.
- Dr Phillip Kelvin Brownlie — For service to medicine as a general practitioner.
- John Gilmour Bruce — For service to the community of Barooga, and to local government.
- Ian Leslie Bubb — For service to veterans and their families.
- Ann Dorothea Buchan — For service to medicine as a neurological physiotherapist.
- Madeleine Phoebe Buchner — For service to youth through a range of organisations.
- Ian Douglas Bull — For service to the community of Shepparton.
- Barry John Bull — For service to the performing arts, particularly through music.
- Kuot Elijah Buol — For service to the African community of Queensland.
- The late Mrs Evelyn Mary Burke — For service to the community, particularly to women.
- Richard Alexander Burman — For service to the community.
- Dallas Lyle Burrage — For service to veterans and their families.
- Samuel John Burston — For service to parliament and politics.
- Amelia Robyn Burton — For service to youth.
- Phillip Andrew Burton — For service to performing arts as an entertainer.
- Roy Burton — For service to the community.
- Air Commodore Philip Darcy Byrne (Retd) — For service to the community through a range of organisations.
- Paulene Mary Cairnduff — For service to horticulture.
- Frederick Louis Calginari — For service to the Italian community of Fremantle.
- Tanya Maree Cameron — For service to the community, particularly to women.
- William Alexander Cameron — For service to the community of Young.
- Carlo Antonio Campana — For service to lawn bowls.
- Dr Alexander John Campbell — For service to medicine as an obstetrician and gynaecologist.
- Allan David Campbell — For service to conservation and the environment.
- Suzanne Mary Cardwell — For service to community health, particularly aged care.
- Fay Priscilla Carter — For service to the Indigenous community of Victoria.
- Dr Ross Ashley Cartmill — For service to medicine, and to the community of Queensland.
- Mark Casey — For service to lawn bowls.
- Grant Thomas Cassidy — For service to the tourism and hospitality industry.
- Suzanne Patricia Cavanagh — For service to politics in the Northern Territory.
- Alexandra Cearns — For service to the community through charitable organisations.
- Owen Charles Chambers — For service to the performing arts, particularly as a music producer.
- Bettine Millicent Chapman — For service to the community.
- Ron Moreton Chapman — For service to the tourism industry in Queensland.
- Susan Patricia Chapman — For service to conservation and the environment.
- Dr Eleanor Chew — For service to medicine in the field of general practice.
- David Chong — For service to the Brazilian community in Victoria.
- Kamrul Hossain Chowdhury — For service to the Bangladeshi community of Melbourne.
- Ruth Christian — For service to the community of Geelong.
- Glenn Harry Christie — For service to the community through support for charitable initiatives.
- Peter Sheu Cheong Chung — For service to the Chinese community of Tasmania.
- Narelle Clapson — For service to Indigenous education.
- Donald Roy Clark — For service to the livestock industry.
- Adrienne Jane Clarke, AFSM — For service to the community, and to women's affairs.
- Hilton James Clarke — For service to cycling.
- Ketrina Jane Clarke — For service to swimming.
- Michael John Clarke — For service to the community through the preservation of military history.
- William Steele Clegg — For service to the tourism and hospitality industry.
- Donald John Clinch — For service to the community of Woolgoolga.
- The late Mr Arthur James Clisby — For service to the community through historic motor vehicle organisations.
- Jeffrey Raymond Close — For service to the communities of Crows Nest and Winton.
- Antonietta Orlanda Cocchiaro — For service to education.
- Dr Ian Douglas Cochrane — For service to people with a disability, and to education.
- Helen Coleman — For service to the community through a range of organisations.
- Corona May Collier — For service to the community of Trundle.
- Peter William Colliver — For service to the community.
- Peter James Conaghan — For service to the community of Yeppoon.
- Matthew Steven Condon — For service to the community.
- Ann Margaret Connan — For service to children.
- Patrick Francis Connelly — For service to the community of Grafton.
- Anne Heather Connor — For service to the law.
- Dr Christine Maree Connors — For service to medicine through a range of roles.
- William Kenneth Cook — For service to surf lifesaving.
- Ross Edward Cooke — For service to community health.
- Brian Anthony Cooper — For service to the community of Wanneroo.
- Steven Alexander Cooper — For service to snow sports.
- Rosemary Yvonne Costar — For service to the community of Ryde.
- James Edward Couper — For service to the community as a church administrator.
- Dr Steven Miles Coverdale — For service to medicine on the Sunshine Coast.
- Leonard Keith Cox — For service to local government, and to the community of the Yarra Ranges.
- Margot Gene Cox — For service to the community of Palmerston.
- Neville John Cox — For service to the community through a range of organisations.
- Peter Maxwell Cox — For service to the community of Numurkah.
- Lynette Suzanne Craigie — For service to local government, and to the community of the Pilbara.
- Betty Helen Cummings — For service to music through community programs.
- John Laurence (Laurie) Cunningham — For service to community history.
- Pamela Curr — For service to the community through support for refugees.
- Margery Helen Currie — For service to youth through Scouts.
- Amanda May Curtis — For service to the community through charitable initiatives.
- Douglas Charles Cutmore — For service to the community of Warwick.
- Christopher Antony Dale — For service to the law.
- Brian James Daley — For service to the community through a range of organisations.
- Robert George Dan — For service to the community through a range of organisations.
- Dr Peter Ian Davidson — For service to medicine as a general practitioner.
- Ronald Lester Davis — For service to heritage preservation.
- Lawrence Bensley Dawson — For service to the community, particularly through BlazeAid.
- Coral Shirley Deague — For service to dance as a choreographer and teacher.
- Wayne Peter Deakes — For service to the community through emergency response training.
- Pamela Joy Deane — For service to the community of North West Sydney.
- Ian Charles Dear — For service to the community through charitable organisations.
- Lieutenant Colonel David Jonathan Deasey, RFD (Retd) — For service to community history.
- Denise Jae Delphin — For service to the community through social welfare initiatives.
- Margaret Elizabeth Dengate — For service to aged welfare.
- Meredith Jane Dennis — For service to community health, particularly palliative care.
- Rocco Di Zio — For service to the Italian community of Victoria.
- Selwyn John Dickfos — For service to sport.
- Lauraine Beth Diggins — For service to the museums and galleries sector.
- Dr Christopher Peter Dodds — For service to medicine as an anaesthetist.
- Christopher Joseph Dooley — For service to the community of Gresford.
- Dr Stuart Francis Dorney — For service to medicine as a paediatric gastroenterologist.
- Mary Eileen Dorrington — For service to the community through a range of organisations.
- Eitan Drori — For service to the Jewish community.
- Paul Terence Duhig — For service to performing arts, particularly through music.
- Dr Janet Elizabeth Duke — For service to medicine as an obstetrician and gynaecologist.
- Margaret Evelyn Dunbar — For service to athletics.
- Ross Dunn — For service to the community through victims of crime advocacy and support.
- Dr Christine Yvonne Durham — For service to education.
- John Robert Duscher — For service to the community of Wonthaggi.
- Professor Peter Laurence Dwyer — For service to medicine as an obstetrician and gynaecologist.
- David John Eden — For service to community health.
- Malcolm Hedley Edwards — For service to youth through Scouts.
- Georgia Ann Efford — For service to the international community through humanitarian aid.
- Kevin Gerald Egan — For service to the community of Torquay.
- Harvey Lee Else — For service to the aviation industry, and to the community of Taree.
- Manar Eltchelebi — For service to the Islamic community of Australia.
- Jeffrey Robert Elworthy — For service to sport, particularly dancing.
- Brian John Engert — For service to the community of Berowra.
- Christine Ann Erby — For service to the community.
- Michael Geoffrey Evans — For service to the community.
- Stanley George Evans — For service to the Parliament of South Australia.
- Susan Joy Exell — For service to the community of Haven.
- Richard John Eylward — For service to sailing.
- Anne Margaret Fagg — For service to the communities of Rocky Cape and Wynyard.
- Diane May Falconer — For service to the community through charitable organisations.
- Marie Therese Farrell — For service to the community through social welfare initiatives.
- Grazia Fava — For service to community health.
- Frederick Peter Fawke — For service to the community of Canberra.
- Beryl Margaret Fenwick — For service to the community.
- Dr Doseena Fergie — For service to community health.
- Vernon Fettke — For service to the community of Wyndham.
- Joe Agrippino Ficarra — For service to the Italian community, and to local government.
- Dr Leonard Ross Fisher — For service to science through a range of roles.
- Sister Rita Ann Fitt — For service to secondary education.
- Kevin Joseph Fitzgerald — For service to the community of Yeronga.
- Colin James Flatters — For service to veterans and their families.
- Roger James Fletcher — For service to primary industry.
- Janice Maureen Flett — For service to the community of Albany.
- Stephanie Margaret Flinn — For service to the community of Hornsby.
- Gail Olivia Ford — For service to the community of Canberra.
- Frank Charles Fordyce — For service to the community, particularly through Freemasonry.
- James Baden Forscutt — For service to the community of Katherine.
- Ronald Harry Forster — For service to the fisheries sector.
- Jill Roslyn Forsyth — For service to the community through a range of roles.
- Professor Christabel Anne Foster — For service to medical education and to community health.
- Geoffry Edward Fowler — For service to engineering.
- Ailsa Jeanette Fox — For service to the community, and to primary industry.
- Russell Kingsley Foxe — For service to the community through charitable organisations.
- The late Cornelia Frances — For service to the performing arts as an entertainer.
- Andrew Terry Fraser — For service to tennis.
- Felicity Jane Frederico — For service to the community.
- Peter Geoffrey Freeman — For service to architecture.
- James Alfred Galpin — For service to the community of Mount Gambier.
- Helen Isabelle Galton — For service to local government, and to the community of Darwin.
- Lynnette Gambrill — For service to veterans and their families.
- Michael George Gandy — For service to cricket.
- Esther Leah Gans — For service to the community.
- Christopher James Garrard — For service to harness racing.
- Sally Anne Garratt — For service to nursing.
- Haileluel Gebre-Selassie — For service to the African community of Victoria.
- Glyndia Joyce Gee — For service to the community of Kerang.
- Robert Charles Gee — For service to the community of Maitland.
- John Tice Gellibrand — For service to the community of the Eurobodalla.
- Kathryn Ann George — For service to music through school ensembles.
- Bakhos Georges — For service to the Lebanese community.
- Garry Robert Gibson — For service to the broadcast media, particularly to television.
- Dawn Gilchrist — For service to community health.
- David John Gill, AFSM — For service to the community of Wagga Wagga.
- John Giorgiutti — For service to the community of Baulkham Hills.
- Mary-Lou Gittins — For service to conservation and the environment.
- John James Given — For service to the community.
- Joy Lorraine Godfrey — For service to the community through charitable initiatives.
- Dale Keith Goldie — For service to the community of Kearsley.
- Noala Patricia Gordon — For service to hockey.
- Tehree Alice Gordon — For service to conservation and the environment.
- Alexander Phillip Gottshall — For service to the media and communications sector, and to the community.
- John Joseph Gouldson — For service to the community of Toowoomba, and to basketball.
- Colleen Mary Graham — For service to public administration.
- Keith Graham — For service to school sports.
- Jennifer Margaret Grainger — For service to the community through charitable organisations.
- Kevin Anthony Grainger — For service to the community of Queanbeyan.
- Professor David Mace Greenberg — For service to medicine in the field of mental health.
- Heather Margaret Gridley — For service to community health.
- Janette Ceipha Griffiths — For service to the community of the NSW South Coast.
- John Ernest Griffiths — For service to the community of the NSW South Coast.
- Dr Frank William Grigg — For service to engineering.
- Dr Judith Anne Grimes — For service to education, and to local history.
- Barbara Doreen Guy — For service to community health.
- Kenneth William Guy — For service to lawn bowls.
- Thi Be Ha — For service to the Vietnamese community.
- Salem Phillip Haddad — For service to the Lebanese community.
- Warwick John Hadfield — For service to broadcast media as a journalist.
- Dorothy Evelyn Hamilton — For service to music, and to people who are blind or have low vision.
- Donald Raymond Hammarquist — For service to local government, and to the community of the Upper Gascoyne.
- John Douglas Hand, AFSM — For service to the community of Finley.
- Ian Frederick Hanson — For service to media and communications, and to sport.
- Rex Stanley Harding — For service to the community of Sydney's Northern Beaches.
- Alan Warren Hardy — For service to aged welfare.
- Denis Charles Hare, BEM — For service to veterans and their families.
- Jennifer Marilyn Harper — For service to community health.
- Dennis Tregonning Harris — For service to surf lifesaving.
- Mark John Harris — For service to the mining sector.
- Jillian Joan Harrison — For service to the community through charitable organisations.
- Carol Harriss — For service to hockey.
- Dr Francis John Harvey — For service to medicine as an orthopaedic surgeon.
- Dr Craig Stephen Hassed — For service to medicine.
- Lorraine Stacey Hatton — For service to the Indigenous community.
- Douglas John Hawkins — For service to veterans and their families.
- Dennis Frederick Hayward — For service to the community of Bankstown.
- Christopher Neil Hazelman — For service to the community of Shepparton.
- Stanley William Head — For service to the community.
- Susan Adele Healy — For service to people with a disability.
- David Cyril Heazlewood — For service to the community through a range of roles.
- Sue Elizabeth Hedley — For service to animal welfare.
- Kevin Patrick Hegarty — For service to public health administration.
- Heather Henderson — For service to local government, and to the community of Subiaco.
- Peter Geoffrey Henderson — For service to the community.
- Priscilla Ann Henderson — For service to community.
- Howard Hendrick — For service to the community of Loxton.
- Ruth Hennings — For service to the Indigenous community, particularly to the 1967 Referendum Campaign.
- The late Kenneth Cyril Herbert — For service to sailing.
- Ellenor Amelia Hetherington — For service to the community through charitable organisations.
- Judith Hewison — For service to children.
- Alan David Hickling — For service to education.
- Garry Robert Higgins — For service to the community of Maryborough.
- Joan Barbara Hillman — For service to sports administration.
- Geoffrey Maxwell Hills — For service to the community.
- Rhonda Marion Hoban — For service to local government, and to the community of Nambucca.
- Dr Nigel Warren Hocking — For service to medicine as a paediatrician.
- Bernard Jan Hoesman — For service to music through brass and concert bands.
- Doris Marie Hoffman — For service to the community of Wellington.
- Dr William Peter Holm — For service to the veterinary profession, and to the community of Burnie.
- Wendy Holman — For service to the community of Cummins.
- Colin Edward Holmes — For service to the community through a range of roles.
- Robert Henry Holschier — For service to the community of Stanhope and district.
- Dr Boon Hung Hong — For service to community health.
- Brian Francis Hopkins — For service to print media, and to the community.
- Elizabeth Anne Hopwood — For service to the community through social welfare organisations.
- Raymond Horder — For service to cricket.
- Dr Donald William Hoassack, OBE, PSM — For service to medicine, and to the arts.
- Coleen Lucille Houston — For service to the community of Hay.
- Virginia Erica Howard — For service to the community of Mosman.
- Lieutenant Colonel John Howells, RFD (Retd) — For service to community history.
- Dr Stephen Creswell Howle — For service to medicine.
- Dr Jon Hronsky — For service to the mining sector.
- Desmond Peter Hudson — For service to youth.
- Geoffrey Drury Hudson — For service to youth through Scouts.
- John Leonard Hudson — For service to the community of Hawthorn.
- Dr Bronwyn Eleanor Hughes — For service to the visual arts.
- John James Hughes — For service to the community through emergency response organisations.
- The Reverend Alfred Peter Humphris — For service to the Anglican Church of Australia.
- Mark David Hunter — For service to youth.
- John Hurley — For service to martial arts.
- Graham Peter Hyde — For service to medical administration.
- Yelena Ilyin — For service to the Russian community of Melbourne.
- Rabbi Chaim Nota Ingram — For service to the Jewish community.
- John Robert Ive — For service to the superfine wool growing industry.
- Martha Maree Jabour — For service to the community through support for victims of crime.
- Francis Adrian Jackson — For service to the performing arts, particularly through music.
- Donald George Jago — For service to the community.
- Dr Bernard Maurice Jenner — For service to the community of the Barwon region.
- John Graeme Jennings — For service to community history.
- Andrew Frank Jessop — For service to the community.
- Maree Evelyn Johnson — For service to veterans and their families.
- Melva Johnson — For service to the Indigenous community of Victoria.
- The Honourable Robert Frank Johnson — For service to the Parliament and community of Western Australia.
- Barbara Johnston — For service to the communities of Wagga Wagga.
- Nicole Danielle Johnston — For service to nursing.
- Melanie Jones — For service to cricket, and to the community.
- Nancy Phyllis Jones — For service to the road transport industry.
- Robert William Joseph — For service to the community.
- Brice Kaddatz — For service to horticulture.
- Terry William Kay — For service to the community through social welfare initiatives.
- Christos Kazonis — For service to the Greek community of Brisbane.
- Norma Margaret Keily — For service to the community of Strathalbyn.
- Gregory George Keir — For service to veterans and their families.
- Graeme Paul Kelly — For service to industrial relations.
- Michael Kelly — For service to the community of the Sunshine Coast.
- Wilfred Joseph Kelly — For service to the community of Upper Horton.
- Peter Anzac Kemp — For service to baseball.
- Margaret Gwendoline Kennedy — For service to the community of Armidale.
- Craig William Kenny — For service to the community.
- John Lawrence Kenny — For service to the community.
- Diane Kerr — For service to the Indigenous community of Victoria.
- William Rutledge Kiernan — For service to the aviation transport industry.
- Grantlee James Kieza — For service to the print media as a journalist.
- Robert John Kilderry — For service to tennis.
- Marilyn Dorothea King — For service to aged welfare.
- Nicole Maree Kiss — For service to the community of Cowra.
- Dr Elise Jane Klein — For service to community through a range of social welfare roles.
- Robert John Knight — For service to the community of Rochester.
- Stephen John Knight — For service to community celebrations.
- Stuart Charles Kollmorgen — For service to the community.
- Sue Margaret Kominek — For service to education, and to the community of Gundaroo.
- Glenda Korporaal — For service to print media as a journalist.
- Petar Kozlina — For service to the Serbian community of Australia.
- Barry Kratzke — For service to the performing arts.
- Carmel Frances Krogh — For service to civil engineering.
- Raymond Edward Kuschert — For service to veterans and their families.
- Craig Antony Laffin — For service to the community.
- Dr Russell Clifford Lain — For service to dentistry.
- Neil Malcolm Lamond — For service to tennis.
- Peter Handley Langhorne — For service to parliament and politics at the state and national level.
- Sean Matthew Langshaw — For service to people with a disability.
- Patricia Joy Large — For service to the community through social welfare initiatives.
- Lt Col Antony William Larnach-Jones (Retd) — For service to community history.
- Mandy Lee Larsson — For service to the community through Lifeline Canberra.
- Elizabeth Margaret Law-Smith — For service to conservation and the environment.
- Catherine Margaret Lawler — For service to conservation and the environment.
- Paul Gregory Laxon — For service to the business sector, and to the community.
- Dianne Maree Layden — For service to the community of Crookwell.
- Bevan John Lee — For service to the broadcast media, particularly to television.
- Bridget Mary Lee — For service to the Irish community of New South Wales.
- Tanya Maree Lee — For service to the community through charitable initiatives.
- Vincent Dominic Le Breton — For service to rugby league.
- Yong Ja Lee — For service to the Korean community.
- Julie Leeming — For service to the community through charitable organisations.
- Prudence Anne Leggoe — For service to women through job-readiness initiatives.
- The Reverend Trevor Ian Leggott — For service to the Indigenous community.
- Reginald Clarence Lemme — For service to the community through pipe bands.
- Leonard Hyman Levy — For service to the pharmacy profession.
- Jennifer Cheryl Lewis — For service to children.
- Ronald Alan Lewis — For service to children.
- Ruby Carmel Liddelow — For service to veterans and their families.
- Dr Robert Kenneth Likeman, CSM — For service to medicine.
- Fiona Jane Lindsay — For service to the community of Dunolly.
- Ian McNeil Lindsay — For service to education.
- Rita Marie Lindsay — For service to aged welfare.
- Robert Stephen Lindsay — For service to the community through social welfare organisations.
- Stuart Gerald Lister — For service to electrical engineering, and to the community.
- Sonya Loader — For service to youth through Scouts.
- Gillian Margaret Lomath — For service to the community of Mullumbimby.
- Colin Bruce Lott — For service to the community through a range of roles.
- Antony James Love — For service to the community.
- Don Robert Low — For service to the community.
- Dr Christopher John Lowry — For service to medicine as an anaesthetist.
- Ken John Lucas — For service to motor sports.
- Geoffrey David Luck — For service to veterans and their families.
- The late John Francis Ludlow — For service to surf lifesaving.
- Raymond Henry Luscombe — For service to the community of Shepparton.
- Terrence James Luthy — For service to the community.
- David Ian Mac Phail — For service to the community through social welfare organisations.
- Helen Frances Macarthur — For service to community health.
- Leigh Mackay — For service to the Anglican Church of Australia.
- The Reverend Colin Adrian Mackellar — For service to community history.
- Bernard Edmund MacKenzie — For service to education.
- Ronald Earl MacLeod — For service to the community through Lions International.
- Jessica Mary Macpherson — For service to the community through the not-for-profit sector.
- Anthony Macri — For service to aged welfare.
- Major General Vikram Madan (Retd) — For service to multicultural affairs.
- Elaine Elizabeth Madill — For service to the community of Wondai.
- Elizabeth Jean Maffei — For service to the community of Mildura.
- Angelo Maggiotto — For service to the community through charitable organisations.
- The late Dr Leo Maguire — For service to medicine as a chiropractor.
- Elaine Dorothy Malicki — For service to local government, and to the community of Ku-ring-gai.
- Gloria Mae Malseed — For service to the community.
- John Barry Malseed — For service to the community.
- Luke William Mangan — For service to the tourism and hospitality industry.
- Julene Gai Mangelsdorf — For service to hockey.
- Heather Mann — For service to the community of Forbes.
- Dr Peter Charles Marendy — For service to medicine, and to the community.
- Neil Graham Marks — For service to cricket.
- Dr Robert Graham Marr — For service to medicine through a range of roles.
- Yvonne Anne Marsden — For service to conservation and the environment.
- Dr Lindsay Howard Marsh — For service to medicine as a general practitioner.
- Adam George Marshall — For service to education.
- James Noel Martin — For service to the community through charitable organisations.
- Moya Alison Martin — For service to the community.
- Keith Frederick Martyn — For service to the community.
- John Richard Mason — For service to the community.
- Helen Louise Matthews — For service to the law.
- Laurie Matthews — For service to the community through social welfare organisations.
- Anthony Henry May — For service to the law.
- The Reverend Jeffrey Richard May — For service to the Churches of Christ in Australia.
- Greg Mayfield — For service to the print media, and to the community.
- Dr Jennifer Lee McArthur (Chambers) — For service to medicine as a vascular surgeon.
- James Charles McCarthy — For service to the community through social welfare organisations.
- Susan Ann McCullough — For service to community health.
- Anthony John McDermott — For service to rugby union.
- Francis Joseph McGovern — For service to veterans and their families.
- Paul Gerard McGrath — For service to the broadcast media, particularly to radio.
- Robert Bruce McIvor — For service to veterans and their families.
- John Alfred McKenzie — For service to the community.
- Pantjiti Unkari McKenzie — For service to the Indigenous community of the Northern Territory.
- Heather Elizabeth McLaren — For service to the community of Maitland.
- Carolyn Ann McMahon — For service to the community.
- Kelvin George McMeeken — For service to youth through Scouts.
- Jane Joan McMillan — For service to community health.
- June McPhie — For service to the law.
- Lachlan Murray McTaggart — For service to local government, and to the community of Upper Gascoyne.
- Cyrus Meher-Homji — For service to the performing arts, particularly through music.
- Marion Ruth Meischke — For service to education.
- Cedric John Mellor, AFSM — For service to the community of Gayndah.
- Dr Stanley John Menzies — For service to the communities of South West Victoria.
- Pauline Mary Messenger — For service to the community of Benalla.
- Stanley Walter Middleton — For service to veterans and their families.
- Marilyn Jean Millar — For service to the community through Lions International.
- David Charles Miller — For service to hockey.
- Kathleen Mary Mills — For service to the Indigenous community.
- Gregor Maxwell Millson — For service to people with a disability.
- Stephen Misiajlo — For service to the Ukrainian community of South Australia.
- Francis John Mitchell — For service to jazz music.
- Peter Francis Monagle — For service to local government, and to the Shire of Harvey.
- Roy Vincent Moriarty — For service to the community through emergency response organisations.
- Beverly Rose Morton — For service to the community.
- Leslie Raymond Moulds — For service to the tourism industry.
- Patricia Mary Moy — For service to the visual arts.
- Mena Helene Muecke — For service to the community through charitable initiatives.
- Peter John Munday — For service to the community through charitable organisations.
- Murray Forbes Murdoch — For service to the wool growing industry.
- Robert Joseph Myers — For service to conservation and the environment.
- Ralph Naden – For service to the Indigenous community of Western New South Wales.
- Alfred Neal – For service to the Indigenous community, particularly to the 1967 Referendum Campaign.
- Donald Ian Neander – For service to aged welfare.
- Danna Lyn Nelse – For service to the community through social welfare organisations.
- Kathryne Helen Nelson – For service to netball and athletics.
- The late Paul Christopher Neville – For service to the Parliament of Australia, and to the community of Bundaberg.
- Jennifer Jean Newton – For service to the community of Hampton.
- Jon Edward Nicholls – For service to the performing arts.
- Dr Wendy Elizabeth Nightingale – For service to the community through charitable initiatives.
- Dinh Duy Ninh – For service to veterans and their families.
- Dr Holly Louise Northam – For service to medicine through a range of roles.
- Michael Norman Norton – For service to the livestock industry.
- Donna Maree O'Brien – For service to football.
- Phillip Michael O'Brien – For service to school sports, and to education.
- Shirley Jane O'Brien – For service to netball.
- David John O'Brien – For service to open water swimming.
- Denis James O'Connell – For service to the community of the Gold Coast.
- Garry James O'Dwyer – For service to the community of the Tweed Coast.
- Thomas Joseph O'Halloran – For service to the community of Irishtown.
- Barbara Merle O'Leary – For service to choral music.
- Janice Patricia O'Neill – For service to tennis.
- Eileen O'Shea – For service to the media and entertainment sectors.
- Vivek Padmanabhan – For service to aged welfare.
- Dr Jane Marie Page – For service to education.
- Dr Dinesh Bandara Palipana – For service to medicine.
- Dr Menon Parameswaran – For service to primary industry.
- Helen Fiona Parker – For service to pregnant women in need.
- The Late Mieczyslaw Waldemar Parks – For service to the community of Geelong.
- Dr Terrence Baden Parsons – For service to education.
- Desmond Francis Pasfield – For service to community of Canterbury-Bankstown.
- The Late Lorraine Lillian Patten – For service to Indigenous community of Victoria.
- Robert Maurice Patterson, RFD – For service to science, particularly the environment and health.
- Glenys Patulny – For service to the community of Tuggeranong.
- Vivienne Pearce – For service to education.
- Dr Harry Archibald Pearson – For service to the community.
- Dr Kerry Ann Peart – For service to nursing.
- Pamela Joy Pedersen – For service to the Indigenous community.
- Timothy Yuill Pellew – For service to cricket.
- The Reverend Neil Andrew Percival – For service to the community through emergency response organisations.
- Michael Charles Perkins – For service to the community.
- Judith Roberta Pettitt – For service to public administration in Victoria.
- Edgar Reginald Pfeiffer – For service to the community of Mount Gambier.
- Lieutenant Colonel David William Phillips (Retd) – For service to veterans and their families.
- John Gary Phoenix – For service to veterans and their families.
- Raoul Arthur Picot – For service to ski patrol organisations.
- The Reverend Father Paul William Pidcock – For service to the Catholic Church of Australia.
- Dr Albert Barrie Pittock, PSM – For service to the Indigenous community.
- John Pizarro – For service to motor sports.
- Terrance Kippax Plowright – For service to the visual arts, particularly as a sculptor.
- Cynthia Lee Pollak – For service to community health.
- Murray Robert Pope – For service to community history.
- John Stanley Pope – For service to community history.
- Robert John Porter – For service to the community.
- Bruce Leonard Prance – For service to the sport of diving.
- Ann Margaret Prescott – For service to conservation and the environment.
- Susan Christine Price – For service to local government, and to the community of Mungindi.
- Geoffrey John Pritchard – For service to the pharmacy profession.
- Emeritus Professor Dimitrios Psaros – For service to the community through charitable initiatives.
- Patricia Catherine Purcell – For service to the community.
- Dr Sujon Kumar Purkayastha – For service to medicine as an obstetrician and gynaecologist.
- Phillip John Pyke – For service to the community.
- Peter John Quigley – For service to the performing arts, particularly through music.
- Peter Vincent Quinn – For service to tennis.
- Leigh Alexander Radford – For service to the broadcast media in rural and regional areas.
- Dr Howard Ralph – For service to conservation and the environment.
- George Alexander Rant – For service to veterans and their families.
- Lois Dawn Rasmussen – For service to heritage preservation.
- Brian Wade Rayment, QC – For service to the law.
- Brian John Reardon – For service to the community through a range of organisations.
- Donna Maree Reggett – For service to veterans and their families.
- Peter Julian Reid – For service to the community of Ballarat.
- James Frederick Renkin – For service to the community of Swanpool.
- Peter Charles Rheinberger – For service to the community.
- David Ian Richards – For service to the community through charitable initiatives.
- Yvonne Maria Richardson – For service to netball.
- Diana Fay Richardson – For service to the community through charitable organisations.
- Rhonda Maree Richardson – For service to the community of Trangie.
- Mervyn Richens – For service to the community through a range of organisations.
- Ailsa Beth Ripper – For service to conservation and the environment.
- William Maxwell Risk – For service to the Indigenous community of the Northern Territory.
- Gregory Blaxland Roberts – For service to the community of Sydney's Northern Beaches.
- Geoffrey Bruce Roberts – For service to the community of Manningham.
- Colin Saul Rockman – For service to sports administration.
- Jonathan Neil Rolfe – For service to community health through fundraising contributions.
- Colleen Joan Rosas – For service to the Indigenous community of the Northern Territory.
- Jan Rose – For service to women, and to youth.
- Peter Hassal Ross – For service to the community of Werribee.
- Alison Estelle Rosser – For service to the community.
- Jane Alison Rowe – For service to the community through support for children of drug dependent parents.
- Janice Patricia Rowlands – For service to education, and to the community of Richmond.
- Barbara Joan Rozenes – For service to the community.
- Frances Mary Rush – For service to the community through social welfare organisations.
- Raymond Charles Russell – For service to athletics.
- Joan Janice Ryan – For service to nursing.
- Dr Jaswinder Singh Samra – For service to medicine as a pancreatic specialist.
- Laurence Charles Sams SC – For service to veterans and their families.
- Brian Russell Samuel – For service to the Jewish community.
- Ronald Colin Sargent – For service to the community through a range of organisations.
- Rosemary Eileen Sawyer – For service to veterans and their families.
- Michael Colin Sayer – For service to the community of Adelaide.
- John Charles Schnaars – For service to veterans and their families.
- Peter Richard Schutz – For service to the agribusiness sector.
- Tito Sciani – For service to the community of Mareeba.
- Robin Alexander Scott – For service to the community of Coomalbidgup.
- Rebecca Jane Scott – For service to the community through social welfare organisations.
- Francis Gregory Seaman – For service to the community of Crookwell.
- Geoffrey Ronald Searl – For service to the community of Avalon Beach.
- Donald James Secomb – For service to the arts, particularly through music.
- William Won-Hong Seung – For service to the Korean community.
- Kevin John Shadbolt – For service to the community.
- Raphael Emmanuel Shammay – For service to the community.
- Bruce Alexander Shearer – For service to the community through social welfare initiatives.
- Paul Francis Sheehan – For service to the community of Port Fairy.
- Rita Mary Shepherd – For service to the community through charitable organisations.
- Ronald Edward Shepherd – For service to the community through bell ringing.
- Andrew Mark Sheriff – For service to community history.
- Dr Margaret Ellen Shore – For service to the international community of Indonesia through education programs.
- John Shore – For service to the community through charitable organisations.
- Rose Mary Shorney – For service to the performing arts through musical direction.
- Max Shub – For service to the community health.
- John Neil Silver – For service to community history.
- Christopher John Simon – For service to the visual arts through support for and promotion of Aboriginal art.
- Valentine John Simpson – For service to the community.
- Lyla Margaret Sirl – For service to domestic horticulture, and to the community.
- Jocelyn Slater – For service to veterans and their families.
- Peter Kevin Smaller – For service to the Jewish community, and to industry.
- Derek Vincent Smith – For service to international community through humanitarian aid.
- Richard Alan Smith – For service to the building and construction industry, and to heritage preservation.
- Clive Julian Smith – For service to children through charitable initiatives.
- Brendon Gordon Smith – For service to the community.
- Peter Thomas Smyth – For service to the community through social welfare initiatives.
- Jane Newton Smyth – For service to the community of Canberra.
- Peter John Snow – For service to the community of Albany.
- Karl James Solomonson – For service to surf lifesaving.
- Rose Sorial – For service to the Egyptian community of Australia.
- Mark Douglas Squirrell – For service to the international community through humanitarian aid.
- Andrea Powys Staines – For service to business, and as a role model for women.
- Noel Bernard Stallard – For service to literature.
- Jennifer Star – For service to education.
- Milan Stenek – For service to the community through St John Ambulance (NSW).
- The Late Ethel Margaret Stephenson – For service to the livestock industry.
- Alan William Stephenson – For service to horticulture.
- Desmond Peter Stevens – For service to the community of Redlands.
- Maria Teresa Stevenson – For service to education.
- Ian James Steward – For service to the community through the Anglican Church of Australia.
- Raymond Jack Steward – For service to the community of Brisbane.
- The Reverend Brian James Stewart – For service to the Baptist Church of Australia.
- Pauline Stewart – For service to the community of Quirindi.
- Elaine Catherine Stewart – For service to the community of Warwick.
- Colin William Stewart – For service to the community of Quirindi.
- John Kay Stone – For service to the community of Grafton.
- Stephen Robert Strange – For service to surf lifesaving.
- Norman Leonard Strong – For service to rugby league.
- Laurence Graham Stroud – For service to the tourism and hospitality industry.
- The Late The Reverend Dr Alan Stubbs – For service to veterans and their families.
- Kerrie Sturtridge – For service to the community of Glen Innes.
- Dr Subbaram Sundar Sundaram – For service to the community through a range of roles.
- Maurice Gerard Swanson – For service to community health.
- Jacye Lorraine Symes – For service to community history.
- Karina Sysko – For service to musical education.
- Dr Maharaj Kishore Tandon – For service to the community through a range of roles.
- Dr Youssef Taouk – For service to the Lebanese community.
- Maxwell Sydney Tavener – For service to veterans and their families.
- Robert John Taylor – For service to the community of St Kilda.
- Margaret Ann Taylor – For service to the community of Stawell.
- Ian Gordon Taylor – For service to the community of Stawell.
- Vernon Phillip Tessier – For service to basketball.
- Geoffrey Neil Thomas – For service to primary industry.
- Lucy Jane Thomas – For service to youth through anti-bullying initiatives.
- Rosie Thomas – For service to youth through anti-bullying initiatives.
- Dr Gregory John Thompson – For service to sport through a range of organisations.
- Eileen Yvonne Thompson – For service to basketball.
- Ian Raymond Thompson – For service to veterans and their families.
- Merle Kay Thompson – For service to the community through a range of organisations.
- Loel Thomson – For service to community history.
- Jane Thornton – For service to the community through social welfare organisations.
- Timothy Foster Thorpe – For service to the broadcast media, particularly to community radio.
- Michael Jerome Tichbon – For service to conservation and the environment.
- Michael John Tierney – For service to the performing arts as an entertainer.
- Andrew James Tierney – For service to the performing arts as an entertainer.
- Nancy Tingey – For service to community health.
- Peter James Tonkin – For service to swimming.
- Dr Richard Murray Tooth, RFD – For service to medicine as an orthopaedic specialist.
- Dr Christine Elizabeth Townend – For service to animal welfare.
- Ellen Mary Traeger – For service to the community.
- Diana Rosemary Travis – For service to the Indigenous community, particularly to the 1967 Referendum Campaign.
- Dr Gordon Ferguson Treble – For service to sports education.
- Janet Christina Trezise – For service to the community through social welfare organisations.
- Upadasa Acharige Udumalagala – For service to the Sri Lankan community of Melbourne.
- Mandar Madhusudan Vaidya – For service to the performing arts.
- Thomas Valenta – For service to the community through charitable organisations.
- Ashley Clive Van De Velde – For service to the community through aeromedical care services.
- George Hans Van Holst Pellekaan – For service to the community.
- Judy Anne Vanrenen – For service to the tourism and hospitality industry.
- Patricia Carolyn Vejby – For service to the community.
- Prudence Norma Viggers – For service to the community of Newcastle.
- Lydia Ann Visintin – For service to nursing.
- Patricia Wade – For service to hockey.
- Colleen Wakefield – For service to the community through hospital auxiliaries.
- Myrna Wakeling – For service to the community.
- Diana Waldron – For service to dance.
- Carmel Louise Walker – For service to the international community of the Pacific Islands.
- Ross Stuart Walker – For service to the community of Beecroft.
- Beverley Iris Wall – For service to the community, particularly to women.
- Susan Melinda Walters – For service to people who are deaf or hard of hearing.
- Barry Hugh Ward – For service to the community.
- William Charles Waterer – For service to wildlife conservation.
- Edward Garrett Waters – For service to the community through a range of organisations.
- Malcolm John Watson – For service to horticulture.
- Dr Jacqueline Watts – For service to local government, and to the community of Melbourne.
- Graeme Eric Watts – For service to veterans and their families.
- Ian Arthur Watts – For service to the museums and galleries sector.
- Lynette Marie Waugh – For service to the community through charitable initiatives.
- Robert James Weatherburn – For service to the performing arts, particularly through music.
- Noelle Claire Weatherley – For service to horticulture.
- John Maurice Webb – For service to people with a disability through sport.
- Jennie Webster – For service to netball.
- Jeffrey William Weir – For service to marine conservation.
- Michael Douglas Whalley – For service to the community through charitable organisations.
- Terence Michael Wheeler – For service to community health.
- James Whiting – For service to the building and construction industry.
- Anastasia Marion Whittaker – For service to the local community of Bathurst.
- The Late Colonel William Alexander Whyte, MC – For service to veterans and their families.
- Mary Frances Wicks – For service to the community of Sunbury.
- Ronald Bert Wiggins – For service to lawn bowls.
- Dr Robert Lewis Wight – For service to medicine through a range of roles.
- John Robert Wilcox – For service to education.
- Harold David Wilkes – For service to the community of Howlong.
- Marion Helen Wilkins – For service to the community through charitable organisations.
- Kristen Ann Will – For services to the legal profession.
- Richard Anthony Williams – For service to veterans and their families.
- John Mark Williams – For service to the community as a volunteer.
- Graeme Henry Williams – For service to the visual arts.
- David Kerry Williams – For service to the community through a range of organisations.
- Dr Ian Colin Willis – For service to community history.
- Leslie Thomas Willmott – For service to local government, and to the community of Maroondah.
- Terence Sidney Wills Cooke – For service to the community.
- Dr Jill Margaret Wilson – For service to conservation and the environment.
- Sosina Tewabe Wogayehu – For service to the performing arts as an entertainer.
- Kathryn Rosemary Wooldridge – For service to nursing.
- Jean Woolfenden – For service to people with a disability.
- Stephanie Bridget Woollard – For service to the international community through humanitarian aid.
- The Venerable Christopher John Wright – For service to the Anglican Church of Australia.
- Peter Burnet Wright – For service to the community through emergency response organisations.
- Diane Holly Wright – For service to community health.
- Juliette Wright – For service to the community through charitable initiatives.
- Joan Lesley Wright – For service to music as an educator.
- Josephine Alicea Wynter – For service to the community.
- Colonel Warwick Anthony Young – For service to veterans and their families.
- Joan Clare Zanker – For service to the community of Mount Barker.
- Robert Yui Hing Zee – For service to the community through a range of roles.
- Zbigniew Zerger – For service to the Polish community.
- Margaret Carmen Zita – For service to the community through charitable initiatives.
- Domenico Zollo – For service to the Italian community of South Australia.

==== Military Division ====
Navy

- Lieutenant Commander Nathan Lindsay Cole, RAN – For meritorious service in the field of maritime communications and Information Systems support.
- Chief Petty Officer Cameron Devenny – For meritorious service to the Royal Australian Navy's Boatswains Mate Workgroup and meritorious devotion to duty as Chief Petty Officer Boatswain HMAS Hobart.
- Captain Mark Gregory McConnell, RAN – For meritorious service to personnel management and shaping future people capability within the Royal Australian Navy.
- Captain Darren John Rae, RAN – For meritorious service in the field of Naval Aviation Engineering.

Army

- Major Jeffrey Cocks – For meritorious achievement as the Officer Commanding and Music Director of the Australian Army Band – Brisbane, and as the Executive Officer of the Australian Army Band.
- Warrant Officer Class One Bradley Michael Doyle – For meritorious service as Regimental Sergeant Major of 1st/19th Battalion, the Royal New South Wales Regiment; as Regimental Sergeant Major of 3rd Battalion, the Royal Australian Regiment; and as Regimental Sergeant Major of Training Task Group Five on Operation OKRA.
- Warrant Officer Class One Trent Rowan Morris – For meritorious service as Regimental Sergeant Major of the 2nd/17th Battalion, Royal New South Wales Regiment and the 2nd Battalion, The Royal Australian Regiment.
- Warrant Officer Class One Jason Graham Robinson – For meritorious performance of duty as the Senior Assistant Instructor, School of Armour; Regimental Sergeant Major 12th/16th Hunter River Lancers; and Regimental Sergeant Major 1st Armoured Regiment.
- Warrant Officer Class One Stephen Norman Taylor – For meritorious service to the Royal Australian Corps of Military Police in regimental leadership roles and enhancing the Military Police Dog Capability.
- Warrant Officer Class One Charmaine Joan Walters – For meritorious service during several postings to Headquarters Joint Operations Command as the Warrant Officer Financial Services, the Group Reserve Manager and Base Operations Warrant Officer.

Air Force

- Warrant Officer Brett Graham Nichols – For meritorious service in personnel capability development; prohibited substance testing; cultural change management; and training leadership in the Royal Australian Air Force.
- Warrant Officer Kenneth George Robertson – For meritorious performance of duty on operations as the Command Warrant Officer of Joint Task Force 633, while deployed to the Middle East Region during the period January 2017 to January 2018.

==== Honorary ====
- Peter Gerald Appleton – For service to the community of Kilmore.
- Geoffrey Gordon Brown – For service to the cotton industry, and to the community of Wee Waa.
- Frank Charles Fordyce – For service to the community, particularly through Freemasonry.

== Meritorius Service ==
=== Public Service Medal (PSM) ===
Public Service Medal ribbon

Federal

- Leilani Rozzanna Bin-Juda – For outstanding public service in promoting the inclusion of Indigenous heritage in Australia's cultural and foreign policies.
- Elsy Brammesan – For outstanding public service in the protection of the health, welfare and interests of people living in aged care facilities.
- Joseph Ernest Castellino – For outstanding public service in leading fiscal policy analysis and advice to the Prime Minister and Cabinet.
- Andrea Collins – For outstanding public service through the improvement of outcomes for Indigenous people.
- Dr Gary Stuart Dolman – For outstanding public service in the leadership of research and contribution to national economic reform in the areas of infrastructure, transport and regional economics.
- Dr Clinton Bruce Foster – For outstanding public service in the application of geoscientific information and data to reduce carbon dioxide emissions.
- John Peter Lonsdale – For outstanding public service through improving the stability, efficiency and competitiveness of Australia's financial system and increasing the robustness of Australia's foreign investment framework.
- Jonathan James Palmer – For outstanding public service as the Deputy Australian Statistician, and through contributions to the international statistical community.
- Lois Margaret Ransom – For outstanding public service through the strengthening of Australia's plant biosecurity system.
- Cathryn Monica Reid – For outstanding public service through the provision of legal advice and contributions to the strategic management of major Commonwealth infrastructure, marine and aviation projects.
- Richard Geoffrey Richardson – For outstanding public service in the area of Indigenous policy and programs.
- Matthew Vincent Yannopoulos – For outstanding public service through the leadership and delivery of reform to payments for Child Care.

New South Wales

- Christopher Lee Bennetts – For outstanding public service to transport in New South Wales.
- Suneetha Bodduluri – For outstanding public service to the development of digital services in New South Wales.
- Graham Bradshaw – For outstanding public service to transport and community services in New South Wales.
- Leanne Margaret Byrne – For outstanding public service through the delivery of the New South Wales Martin Place Permanent Memorial project.
- Roslyn Patricia Lang – For outstanding public service to the New South Wales Police Force.
- Genevieve Mary McConnell – For outstanding public service to community aged care facilities in New South Wales.
- Leanne Gay O'Shannessy – For outstanding public service to health services through legal counsel in New South Wales.
- Magda Helen Pollak – For outstanding public service to education in New South Wales.
- Laurel Ann Russ – For outstanding public service to the Indigenous community of New South Wales.
- Christopher Charles Wheeler – For outstanding public service to policy development and reform initiatives in New South Wales.
- Barbara Alison Wise – For outstanding public service to transport reforms in New South Wales.
- Alan James Young – For outstanding public service to local government in New South Wales.

Victoria

- Margaret Joy Abbey – For outstanding public service to local government, and through contributions to the communities of the Murrindindi Shire through the period of recovery after the 2009 Victorian Bushfires.
- Gillian Anne Callister – For outstanding public service through leadership of, and innovation in, policy development and service delivery across a range of portfolios in Victoria.
- Rebecca Falkingham – For outstanding public service through innovative policy design and service delivery of public service reform in Victoria.
- Dr Jennifer Helen Gray – For outstanding public service in the field of improved animal conservation and modern zoo management in Victoria.
- Jane Elizabeth Hayward, AM – For outstanding public service to education in Victoria through the development of bushfire education projects.
- Vernon Hilditch – For outstanding public service to education and the support of families in the school community in Victoria.
- Jacqueline Mary Lowther – For outstanding public service to education through the promotion of improved outcomes for students in special developmental schools in Victoria.
- Robert James Marsh, RFD – For outstanding public service to the property sector in Victoria, and to the development and standards of the valuation profession.
- David John Martine – For outstanding public service to social, microeconomic and public sector reform and innovation in Victoria.
- David Malcolm Parkes – For outstanding public service through the development and delivery of enhanced biodiversity outcomes in Victoria.

Queensland

- Kevin John Flanagan – For outstanding public service in the area of local government in Queensland.
- Fiona Joy Gardiner – For outstanding public service through the management of cultural heritage in Queensland.
- Julie Ann Hulcombe – For outstanding public service in the area of allied health reform and access to high quality care in Queensland.
- Dr Sharon Lee Mullins – For outstanding public service through education and training plans for youth in Queensland.
- Michelle Louise Parker – For outstanding public service through the development of domestic and family violence prevention initiatives in Queensland.
- Mary Margaret Weaver – For outstanding public service through a range of executive service support roles in Queensland.

South Australia

- Francis Newman Brennan – For outstanding public service to local government and planning in South Australia.
- Professor Mehdi Doroudi – For outstanding public service through the advancement of science to inform policy, and to the management of primary industries in South Australia.
- Geraldine Mitra – For outstanding public service through the implementation of the National Disability Insurance Scheme in South Australia.

Australian Capital Territory

- Glynis Helen Steward – For outstanding public service to education in the Australian Capital Territory.
- Meredith Lily Whitten – For outstanding public service to organisational integrity and capability in the disability sector in the Australian Capital Territory.
- Dr Loretta Maria Zamprogno – For outstanding public service to the law, and to legal education, in the Australian Capital Territory.

Northern Territory

- Marion Isobel Guppy – For outstanding public service to the education sector in the Northern Territory.
- Stephen Craig Lyons – For outstanding public service through the management of office services in the Northern Territory.

=== Australian Police Medal (APM) ===
Australian Police Medal ribbon

Federal

- Detective Superintendent Jason Nicholas Kennedy
- Detective Superintendent Terry Venchiarutti

New South Wales

- Detective Superintendent Darren Murray Bennett
- Sergeant Philip Joseph Elliott
- Detective Superintendent Kenneth James Finch
- Chief Inspector Paul Philip Fownes, OAM
- Superintendent David Andrew Johnson
- Detective Superintendent Dean Raymond Smith
- Assistant Commissioner Gelina Talbot
- Chief Superintendent Scott Andrew Whyte

Victoria

- Superintendent Charles Thomas Allen
- Superintendent Alison Catherine Boyes
- Acting Inspector Patricia Maree Duke
- Superintendent Peter Geoffrey Lardner
- Inspector Danielle Marie Leemon
- Inspector Stephen John Mutton
- Senior Sergeant Steven Thomas Rosewarne
- Commander Neville Leigh Taylor

Queensland

- Superintendent Darryl R. Johnson
- Inspector Monique Louise Ralph
- Detective Inspector Jonathan Patrick Rouse
- Sergeant Gina Marie Scott
- Senior Sergeant Annette Maree Stevens
- Chief Superintendent Matthew Philip Vanderbyl

Western Australia

- Commander Stuart Andrew Bartels
- Senior Sergeant Mark Anthony Fleskens
- Brevet Senior Sergeant Revis Anthony Ryder
- Sergeant Kylie Anne Simmonds

South Australia

- Detective Brevet Sergeant Mark Stewart Hay
- Superintendent Grant Anthony Moyle
- Detective Chief Superintendent Joanne Shanahan

Tasmania

- First Class Constable Tania Maree Curtis
- Sergeant Rodney James Stacey

Northern Territory

- Detective Sergeant Trent William Abbott
- Sergeant Neil Ryan Mellon

=== Australian Fire Service Medal (AFSM) ===
Australian Fire Service Medal ribbon

New South Wales

- William Bean
- Alan Thomas Cooper
- Michael Forbes
- John Gill
- Gordon Henry Heckendorf
- Peter Alan Holding
- Harry Alfred Le Busque
- Marcia May Le Busque
- James Albert Simpson

Victoria

- Gwynne Veronica Brennan
- John Thomas Callahan
- Colin T. Campbell
- Nicole Maree Harvey
- Colin James Newell
- Michael Keith Tisbury

Queensland

- John Norman Bolger
- Nigel Leonard Burnell
- Michael Brian Wassing

Western Australia

- Francis Roy Burgoyne
- Robert Anthony Moiler
- Peter Michael Narducci

South Australia

- Anthony Edward Favretto
- Jo-Anna Erin Kenney
- Gregory Hugh Nettleton

Tasmania

- Christopher James Arnol
- Scott Douglas Clarke
- Terence Allan White

Australian Capital Territory

- Gregory Francis Harmey

Northern Territory

- Alan Bruce Fountain

=== Ambulance Service Medal (ASM) ===
Ambulance Service Medal ribbon

New South Wales

- Cameron Robert Edgar
- Carolyn Parish

Victoria

- David John Booth
- Dr Kathryn Jean Eastwood
- Robert John Fergusson
- Robyn Winifred Kelly
- Nicholas Paul Roder
- Ross Alan Salathiel
- Catherine Ann Southern

Queensland

- John Robert Hammond

Western Australia

- David Wansbrough Abbott
- Peter Robert Hewat
- Eleanor Therese Hill

South Australia

- Robert Harvey Berlin
- Christine Gwenda Brown
- Graeme James Rayson

Tasmania

- Simone Lesley Haigh

=== Emergency Services Medal (ESM) ===
Emergency Services Medal ribbon

New South Wales

- Glenn Austin Jones
- Raymond Kenneth Lotty
- Dean Allan Storey

Victoria

- Gregory James Baeck
- Ricky Charles Cooper
- Brett Patrick Taylor

Queensland

- John Alistair Newley
- Karen Hazel Peters

South Australia

- Axel Larsen
- Andrew John O'Brien

Western Australia

- Kenneth Gordon Dewhirst
- Robert James Howard, OAM

Tasmania

- Alton Craig Bond
- Mark William Dance
- Lynton Zane Free

=== Australian Corrections Medal (ACM) ===
Australian Corrections Medal ribbon

New South Wales

- Justin Jay Beavis
- Kylie Fogarty
- David Stewart Thomas
- Mandy Lee Zaccazan

Victoria

- Teu Merelina Bentley
- Maria Fazio

Queensland

- Dennis Allan Hayes
- Julie Therese Steinheuier

Western Australia

- Stephen Paul Blenkinsopp
- Caroline Mary Jolly
- Ernest Rodney Rahman

South Australia

- Helen Mallen
- David Michael Oates

Tasmania

- Shaun Patrick Wheeler

Northern Territory

- Kevin Andrew Raby

== Distinguished and Conspicuous Service ==
=== Distinguished Service Cross (DSC) ===
Distinguished Service Cross ribbon

Army

- Lieutenant General John Frewen, AM – For distinguished command and leadership in warlike operations as the Commander Joint Task Force 633 on Operations OKRA and HIGHROAD from January 2017 to January 2018.
- Colonel M – For distinguished command and leadership in warlike operations as the Commanding Officer of a deployed Task Group during Operation OKRA, May 2017 to December 2017.

Air Force

- Group Captain J – For distinguished command and leadership in warlike operations as Commander Task Element 630.1.1 on Operation OKRA from March 2016 to September 2016.

=== Bar to the Distinguished Service Medal (DSM and Bar) ===
Army

- Major S, DSM – For distinguished leadership in warlike operations as the Officer Commanding within a deployed task group on Operation OKRA in Iraq from May 2017 to December 2017.

=== Distinguished Service Medal (DSM) ===
Distinguished Service Medal ribbon

Army

- Corporal A – For distinguished leadership in warlike operations while deployed as a Special Operations Medic during Operation OKRA, from May 2017 to December 2017.
- Lieutenant Colonel Giles Cornelia, CSM – For distinguished leadership in warlike operations as Commanding Officer Training Task Unit of Task Group Taji V while deployed on Operation OKRA from June 2017 to December 2017.
- Colonel Steven John D'Arcy – For distinguished leadership in warlike operations as the Commander of Task Group Taji V in Iraq from June 2017 to December 2017.
- Brigadier Michael David Prictor, AM – For distinguished leadership in warlike operations as the Commander of Task Group Afghanistan on Operation HIGHROAD from November 2016 to November 2017.
- Brigadier Craig Donald Shortt, DSC, CSC – For distinguished leadership in warlike operations as the CJ3 Chief of Operations, Headquarters Resolute Support, Kabul, Afghanistan while deployed on Operation HIGHROAD over the period September 2016 to October 2017.

Air Force

- Squadron Leader D – For distinguished leadership in warlike operations as the Strike Element Executive Officer on Operation OKRA from April 2017 to August 2017.

=== Commendation for Distinguished Service ===
Commendation for Distinguished Service ribbon

Navy

- Lieutenant Patrick Charles McGuire, RAN – For distinguished performance of duties in warlike operations as the Aviation Operations Officer for Train Advise Assist Command – South, while force assigned to Operation HIGHROAD, Afghanistan from August 2017 to February 2018.

Army

- Warrant Officer Class One A – For distinguished performance of duties in warlike operations as the Regimental Sergeant Major of a deployed Task Group on Operation OKRA from May to December 2017.
- Colonel Michael Timothy Bye – For distinguished performance of duties in warlike operations as the Chief Future Plans, CJ5 Branch, Headquarters Resolute Support, Kabul, Afghanistan while deployed on Operation HIGHROAD over the period December 2016 to November 2017.
- Major Edouard Charles Cousins – For distinguished performance of duties in warlike operations as the Officer Commanding Training Company Kilo One of the Training Task Unit, Task Group Taji V, while deployed on Operation OKRA from May 2017 to December 2017.
- Brigadier William Robert Date – For distinguished performance of duties in warlike operations as the Senior Military Advisor and Chief of Military Advisor Unit in the United Nations Assistance Mission in Afghanistan from July 2013 to July 2014.
- Colonel David Charles Hafner, CSC – For distinguished performance of duties in warlike operations as the Director of Plans in Combined Joint Forces Land Component Command – Operation INHERENT RESOLVE while deployed on Operation OKRA from April 2017 to January 2018.
- Major David Steven Hill – For distinguished performance of duties in warlike operations as the Chief of Staff of the Special Operations Advisory Group in support of the Afghan General Command of Police Special Units on Operation HIGHROAD, from December 2016 to June 2017.
- Brigadier Rupert John Hoskin, AM – For distinguished performance of duties in warlike operations as the Director Plans in Headquarters Combined Joint Task Force – Operation INHERENT RESOLVE from January 2017 to January 2018.
- Sergeant M – For distinguished performance of duties in warlike operations as the Second in Command of the Force Protection Team from June 2017 to November 2017 for the Special Operations Advisory Group, while deployed on Operation HIGHROAD.
- Lieutenant Colonel N – For distinguished performance of duties in warlike operations as the Chief of Staff and Operations Officer of a deployed Task Group on Operation OKRA in Iraq from May 2017 to December 2017.
- Captain N – For distinguished performance of duties in warlike operations as an Officer Commanding for Special Operations Task Group 632 Rotation V during Operation OKRA, July to December 2016.
- Major David Patrick Ready – For distinguished performance of duties in warlike operations as Officer Commanding Intelligence, Surveillance and Reconnaissance Company, Task Group Taji – V, in Iraq on Operation OKRA from May 2017 to Dec 2017.
- Major Darrin William Tyson – For distinguished performance of duties in warlike operations as the Headquarters Task Group Afghanistan Operations Officer and Officer Commanding Force Protection Element-7 in Kabul, while deployed on Operation HIGHROAD from January 2017 to September 2017.
- Warrant Officer Class Two Matthew Colby Vermey – For distinguished performance of duties in warlike operations as the Operations Warrant Officer and Logistics Officer of the Training Task Unit, Task Group Taji-V, JTF 633 whilst deployed on Operation OKRA 2017, from May 2017 to December 2017.

Air Force

- Squadron Leader H – For distinguished performance of duties in warlike operations whilst deployed as the Strike Task Unit Dynamic Targeting Legal Advisor on Operation OKRA from March 2017 to October 2017.
- Group Captain Antony Edward Martin – For distinguished performance of duties in warlike operations whilst deployed as Commander Air Task Group 630 on Operation OKRA from December 2015 until July 2016.
- Squadron Leader P – For meritorious performance of duties in warlike operations as the Senior Intelligence Duty Officer, Combined Air Operations Centre, in support of Operation OKRA from June 2017 to January 2018.
- Wing Commander P – For distinguished performance of duties in warlike operations whilst deployed as Commander Task Unit 630.2 on Operation OKRA from August 2017 to January 2018.
- Squadron Leader S – For distinguished performance of duties in warlike operations as the Strike Executive Officer for Task Element 630.1.1 on Operation OKRA from August 2017 to December 2017.

=== Bar to the Conspicuous Service Cross (CSC and Bar) ===
Conspicuous Service Cross and Bar ribbon

Army

- Lieutenant Colonel Benjamin McLennan, CSC – For outstanding achievement as the Commander Joint Task Group 629 on Operation AUGURY (Philippines) from October 2017 to February 2018.

=== Conspicuous Service Cross (CSC) ===
Conspicuous Service Cross ribbon

Navy

- Captain Peter Darrell Bartlett, RAN – For outstanding achievement in the field of Navy Task Group pre-operational training and preparation.
- Lieutenant Commander Victoria Anne Canton, – For outstanding devotion to duty in the field of Defence nursing and personnel support.
- Captain Nicholas Byers Hart, RAN – For outstanding devotion to duty, dedication and achievement as the Naval Attaché to Indonesia.
- Commander Rachel Elise Jones, RAN – For outstanding achievement in the application of exceptional skills as the Command Legal Officer within Headquarters Joint Task Force 633 on Operation ACCORDION from March 2017 to September 2017.
- Captain Anthony Michael Klenthis, RAN – For outstanding achievement in strategic workforce planning for the Royal Australian Navy.
- Commodore Antony Simon Partridge, RAN – For outstanding devotion to duty as the Director General – Defence Force Recruiting.
- Captain James George Renwick, SC, RAN – For outstanding devotion to duty as a legal officer in the Royal Australian Naval Reserve.
- Commander Luke Richard Ryan, RAN – For outstanding achievement in the performance of duty as the Commanding Officer of the Royal Australian Navy Recruit School.
- Captain Mark David Sirois, RAN – For outstanding achievement in the application of exceptional skills, judgement and dedication as the Commanding Officer of HMAS Newcastle while deployed on Operation MANITOU from July 2017 to November 2017.
- Captain Cameron W R Steil, RAN – For outstanding achievement as the Commanding Officer HMAS Arunta, while deployed on Operation MANITOU from November 2016 to July 2017.

Army

- Lieutenant Colonel Scott James Barras – For outstanding devotion to duty in the field of Defence capability development domain.
- Lieutenant Colonel Margaret Ghislaine Beavan – For outstanding achievement as the Staff Officer Grade One, Army Gap Year Program, in planning, establishing and delivering Army's Gap Year programs on an annual basis.
- Colonel Daniel Nicholas Bennett – For outstanding achievement as the Senior Military Liaison Officer for Bor and Juba while deployed as the Commander of the Australian Contingent on Operation ASLAN from November 2016 to August 2017.
- Lieutenant Colonel Wade Graham Cooper – For outstanding achievement and devotion to duty as the Brigade Major, Headquarters 1st Brigade.
- Colonel Anthony Gawain Duus – For outstanding achievement in the performance of duties as Director Armoured Fighting Vehicles, Army Headquarters.
- Lieutenant Colonel Louise Ann Martin – For outstanding achievement as the Commanding Officer of the 2nd General Health Battalion.
- Colonel Blaydon Wesley Marston Morris – For outstanding achievement in leadership, skills and application as the Commanding Officer of the 1st Signal Regiment.
- Lieutenant Colonel Colin Robert Morrison – For outstanding achievement as the Combined Joint Chief of Operations of the Multinational Force and Observers, Sinai, Egypt and as the Commander Australian Contingent, Operation MAZURKA from February 2017 to February 2018.
- Lieutenant Colonel Paul David Nelson – For outstanding achievement as the Staff Officer Grade One Technical Management within Headquarters Forces Command.
- Lieutenant Colonel Douglas Ian Pashley – For outstanding achievement in leadership, skills and application as the Commanding Officer of the 2nd Battalion, the Royal Australian Regiment.
- Lieutenant Colonel Mark Christopher Smith – For outstanding achievement as the Commanding Officer of 25th/49th Battalion, the Royal Queensland Regiment and Commanding Officer of Battle Group CANNAN.
- Colonel Fern Mary-Ellen Thompson – For outstanding achievement as the Commanding Officer of the 6th Aviation Regiment.
- Colonel Joanne Kathleen Whittaker – For outstanding achievement as the Director of the Land Command, Control and Communications Directorate, Systems and Integration Branch, Army Headquarters.

Air Force

- Warrant Officer William Edward Gibson – For outstanding achievement in cultural development and maintenance management as the Warrant Officer Engineering at Number 33 Squadron, Royal Australian Air Force.
- Wing Commander Vhonda Gay Hewson – For outstanding devotion to duty in training development and delivery as the Commanding Officer of the Royal Australian Air Force School of Administration and Logistics Training.
- Flight Sergeant K – For outstanding achievement in the development and delivery of specialised air to surface communications integration capabilities for the Royal Australian Air Force.

=== Conspicuous Service Medal (CSM) ===
Conspicuous Service Medal ribbon

Navy

- Lieutenant Commander Benjamin Daniel Crowther, RAN – For meritorious achievement in the field of Naval unmanned aircraft.
- Lieutenant Commander Neil Jonathon Davenport, RAN – For meritorious achievement and devotion to duty in the field of minor war vessel capability development with the Royal Australian Navy.
- Petty Officer N – For meritorious achievement in the field of Navy Expeditionary Reconnaissance and Clearance Diving training.
- Lieutenant Jennifer Louise Neuhaus, RAN – For meritorious achievement in the performance of duty as the Course Implementation Officer at the School of Navigation Warfare.
- Lieutenant Commander Darryl Wilton Scott, RAN – For meritorious achievement as the Senior Instructor Maritime Intelligence Wing at the Defence Force School of Intelligence.
- Chief Petty Officer Andrew Spencer – For meritorious achievement in weapon safety and materiel management in the Royal Australian Navy.

Army

- Lieutenant Colonel Hamish Jon Aashman – For meritorious achievement in defensive cyber capability development as the Deputy Director – Land, Joint Cyber Directorate within Information Warfare Branch, Joint Capabilities Group.
- Major Nigel Bruce Bellette – For meritorious devotion to duty as the Operations Officer of the 1st Combat Service Support Battalion.
- Major James Duncan Burchmore – For meritorious achievement in the development and implementation of mental health and suicide prevention initiatives for the Australian Defence Force.
- Corporal Hayley Louise Cornish – For meritorious devotion to duty as an Orderly Room Clerk and Acting Chief Clerk within 3rd Battalion, the Royal Australian Regiment.
- Corporal Jayden Mark Day – For meritorious achievement as a Corporal in the headquarters of 1st Field Squadron, 1st Combat Engineer Regiment.
- Chaplain Ralph Gary Estherby – For meritorious devotion to duty as a Chaplain and in supporting the welfare of seriously wounded, injured and ill soldiers and their families across numerous Australian Army units from 2014 to 2018.
- Warrant Officer Class One David Anthony Hayes – For meritorious devotion to duty as the Assistant Army Attaché, Australian Defence Staff – Jakarta.
- Lieutenant Colonel Jake Richard Kearsley – For meritorious achievement as the Commanding Officer of the Adelaide Universities Regiment.
- Captain Megan Hayley McDermott – For meritorious achievement as the Deputy Public Affairs Officer within Headquarters Joint Task Force 633 on Operation ACCORDION from February 2017 to September 2017.
- Major Matthew Richard McFarland – For meritorious achievement as the Deputy Director Exercise Plans – J7 Branch, Headquarters Joint Operations Command.
- Lieutenant Colonel Paul Mellin O'Donnell – For meritorious achievement as the Operations Officer within Headquarters Joint Task Force 633 on Operation ACCORDION from February 2017 to November 2017.
- Major Pierre Robert Pel – For meritorious achievement as the Joint Task Group 629 Liaison Officer to the Armed Forces of the Philippines during Operation AUGURY – PHILIPPINES.
- Lieutenant Colonel John Lloyd Venz – For meritorious devotion to duty as the Contingent Commander of the 2017 Army Aboriginal Community Assistance Programme deployment in Toomelah, New South Wales.
- Major Ross A Wehby – For meritorious achievement in Joint Close Air Support as Officer Commanding Joint Terminal Attack Control Troop and Chief Instructor, Standardisation Officer at Number 4 Squadron.

Air Force

- Wing Commander Louise Ellen Burstow – For meritorious achievement and devotion to duty in a non-warlike operation while deployed as Task Group Commanding Officer Expeditionary Airbase Operations Unit, Middle East Region on Operation ACCORDION from April 2017 to October 2017.
- Squadron Leader Grant David Everett – For meritorious achievement in organisational change and workforce reform as the Transformation Project Manager in the Tactical Fighter Systems Program Office of Capability Acquisition and Sustainment Group.
- Corporal Kelvin Green – For meritorious achievement in aircraft surface finishing maintenance support for the C-17A Globemaster III heavy transport aircraft for the Royal Australian Air Force.
- Squadron Leader Allan Andrew Hagstrom – For meritorious achievement in air combat capability sustainment for the Royal Australian Air Force as Executive Officer of Number 1 Squadron.
- Wing Commander Marija Jovanovich – For meritorious achievement and devotion to duty as the initial Commander of Task Element 629.3.1.1 during operation PHILIPPINES ASSIST, supporting the liberation of Marawi.
- Squadron Leader Aaron Marko Jozelich – For meritorious achievement in aircraft structural integrity engineering in the Australian Defence Force.
- Leading Aircraftman Casey Alexander Miers – For meritorious achievement in avionics maintenance development at Number 92 Wing for the Royal Australian Air Force.
- Sergeant James Thomas Oates – For meritorious achievement in targeting accreditation and training for the Australian Defence Force.
- Flight Lieutenant Kalyan Murthy Rachakatla – For meritorious devotion to duty as the Officer-in-Charge of Visa Coordination, Expeditionary Airbase Operations Unit – 1 from April 2017 to October 2017.
- Flight Sergeant Leonie Angela Read – For meritorious achievement in training development at Number 3 Control and Reporting Unit for the Royal Australian Air Force.
- Squadron Leader S – For meritorious achievement in the delivery of intelligence support to Australian Defence Force operations.
- Group Captain Stephen Wedgewood Young – For meritorious devotion to duty as the Commander of Air Task Group Headquarters on Operation OKRA from December 2016 to October 2017.
