= Lynne Williams =

Lynne Williams may refer to:

- Lynne Williams (educator) (born 1947), Australian educator and musician
- Lynne Williams (politician), American politician

== See also ==
- Lynn Williams (disambiguation)
