= Stuart Wood =

Stuart Wood may refer to:

- Stuart Wood (police commissioner) (1889–1966), ninth Commissioner of the Royal Canadian Mounted Police
- Stuart Wood (musician) (born 1957), guitarist of the Bay City Rollers
- Stuart Wood (cricketer) (born 1939), English cricketer
- Stuart Wood (lawyer), Australian barrister
- Stuart Wood (canoeist) (born 1994), British paracanoeist
