= Neil Marks =

Australian cricketer (1938–2024)

Personal information
- Full name: Neil Graham Marks
- Born: 13 September 1938; Sydney, New South Wales, Australia
- Died: 27 January 2024 (aged 85)
- Batting: Left-handed

Domestic team information
- Years: Team
- 1958/59 and 1959/60: New South Wales

Career statistics
Competition	First-class
Matches	10
Runs scored	568
Batting average	47.33
100s/50s	2/3
Top score	180*
Catches/stumpings	6/0
- Source: Cricinfo, 30 January 2024

Neil Graham Marks OAM (13 September 1938 – 27 January 2024) was an Australian cricketer. He played ten first-class matches for New South Wales between 1958/59 and 1959/60.

In the 2019 Australia Day Honours Marks was awarded the Medal of the Order of Australia (OAM) for service to cricket. He died on 27 January 2024, at the age of 85.

== Books ==
- Tales from the Locker Room (Ironbark Press, 1993)
- Tales for All Seasons (Harper Sports, 1997)
- Australian People, Australian Tales (HarperCollins, 1999)
- Great Australian Cricket Stories (ABC Books, 2002)
- Tales from the Sports Field (ABC Books, 2005)
- Tales of the Century (Barker College, 2008)
