= Goetz Richter =

Goetz Richter AM is a musician, violinist and teacher. He is Associate Professor and Chair of Strings at the Sydney Conservatorium of Music.

He is involved in music competitions including most recently the Michael Hill International Violin Competition in New Zealand and the Kendall National Violin Competition in Australia. Richter was appointed an Honorary Member of the Order of Australia in the 2019 Australia Day Honours for service to music.
