= Jonathan Vaughan =

Principal of the Guildhall School of Music and Drama
- Incumbent
- Assumed office July 2022
- Preceded by: Lynne Williams

Personal details
- Born: July 1963 (age 63)
- Education: Royal College of Music

Jonathan Andrew Vaughan (born July 1963) is a British double-bassist, academic and university administrator who is currently the Principal of the Guildhall School of Music and Drama. Prior to assuming the role of Principal, he was Vice-Principal and Director of Music from 2007 to 2021. He also previously held the posts of CEO and artistic director of the National Youth Orchestra of Great Britain and Chairman of the London Symphony Orchestra.
