= Lynn Williams =

Lynn Williams may refer to:

== Sports ==
- Lynn Williams (sailor) (born 1939), American Olympic sailor
- Lynn Williams (soccer) (born 1993), American soccer player

== Other ==
- Lynn R. Williams (1924–2014), Canadian labor leader and President of United Steelworkers of America
- Lynn "Red" Williams (born 1963), American actor

== See also ==
- Lynn Kanuka-Williams (born 1960), Canadian Olympic runner
- Lynne Williams (disambiguation)
