= Melanie Wakefield =

Australian health researcher

Melanie Wakefield AO FASSA
- Born: Melanie Ann Bullock

Academic background
- Education: University of Adelaide
- Thesis: Evaluation of a smoking cessation intervention for pregnant women and their partners attending a public hospital antenatal clinic (1994)

Academic work
- Institutions: Cancer Council of Victoria

Melanie Ann Wakefield AO FASSA is an Australian psychologist and behavioural researcher at the Cancer Council of Victoria. She has worked extensively on cancer prevention including tobacco control, through the introduction of plain-paper packaging.

== Academic career ==
Wakefield has a BA, GradDip in applied psychology, (1981) MA and PhD (1994) from the University of Adelaide.

Wakefield has been Director of the Centre for Behavioural Research in Cancer at the Cancer Council of Victoria since 2002.

Wakefield was a member of the Prevention and Community Health Committee of the National Health and Medical Research Council from 2012 to 2015.

She is an honorary professor in the Melbourne School of Psychological Sciences at the University of Melbourne.

== Honours and recognition ==
Wakefield was elected Fellow of the Academy of Social Sciences in Australia in 2011. She was appointed Officer of the Order of Australia in the 2019 Australia Day Honours for "distinguished service to medical research in the fields of population health and cancer prevention, and as a mentor".
