= Sandra Harding (sociologist) =

Australian economic sociologist and academic administrator

Sandra Lee Harding is an Australian economic sociologist and university administrator. She was Vice-Chancellor and President of James Cook University from 2007 until January 2022.

== Education ==
Harding received a BSc from the Australian National University. She was later awarded a MPubAdmin by the University of Queensland and a PhD by North Carolina State University.

== Career ==
In 1987 Harding was appointed a lecturer at Queensland University of Technology and was later promoted senior lecturer and professor. She was dean of QUT's Business faculty from 1998 to 2003, and in 2004 she became Deputy Vice-Chancellor (International and Development) of QUT.

Sandra Harding was appointed Vice-Chancellor and President of James Cook University in 2007. She retired from the vice-chancellorship of JCU in January 2022, and was awarded professor emeritus status.

During her tenure at JCU she also was a board member, then deputy chairperson, and then chairperson from 2013 to 2015 of Universities Australia (formerly the Australian Vice Chancellors Committee).

Harding was one of three commissioners appointed in 2012 to the Commission of Audit into state of Queensland's finances, which was led by Peter Costello.

Harding has been a member of the Leadership Council (previously the Board of Governors) of the Committee for Economic Development of Australia (CEDA) since 2013–14.

== Honours and recognition ==
Harding was awarded an honorary doctorate by Japan's Josai International University in 2010. She was appointed honorary fellow of the Australian College of Educators in 2012 and is a fellow of the Queensland Academy of Arts and Sciences.

Harding was appointed Officer of the Order of Australia (AO) in the 2019 Australia Day Honours for "distinguished service to education at the national and international level, and to the community of Queensland".
