= Andrew Pridham =

Australian investment banker (born 1966)

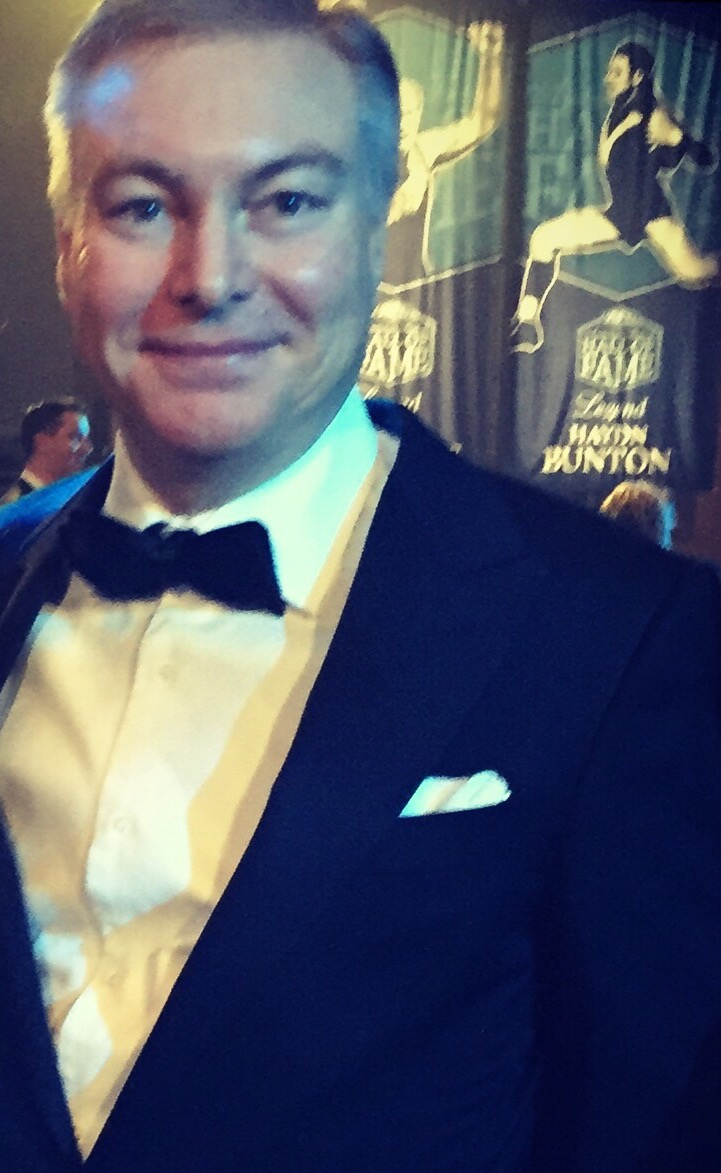

Andrew Pridham AO (born 24 August 1966) is an Australian investment banker. He is the Co-founder and Group Vice Chairman of financial services firm MA Financial Group as well as Chairman of AFL Club, the Sydney Swans.

== Career ==
Originally from Adelaide, Pridham attended Rostrevor College. Pridham was previously Managing Director and Head of Investment Banking, Australasia at UBS. He was appointed Managing Director at 28. He spent years working in London and Singapore as global head of real estate at UBS before returning to Australia in retirement aged 34.

He then founded a boutique investment banking business called First Provident. In 2004 JP Morgan acquired First Provident and Pridham was appointed as its Head of Investment Banking and later Executive Chairman. In 2009 he left to establish the Australian arm of US Investment Bank Moelis & Company. Moelis & Company Australia is a 50/50 joint venture where Australian executives, including Pridham, own 50% of the business. The firm has since re-branded to MA Financial Group, of which Pridham was CEO of till 2020. He then stepped down to his current role of Group Vice Chairman.

Upon his return to Australia in 2004, he was appointed to the board of the Sydney Swans. In 2013 he was appointed Chair. In his first season as Chair, the Sydney Swans finished minor Premiers and qualified for the 2014 AFL Grand Final where it was defeated by Hawthorn. Pridham has at times been an outspoken critic of what he sees as the excessive voice of some Melbourne based AFL clubs, and in particular Collingwood's Eddie McGuire. In 2015 Pridham found himself at the centre of a major national controversy relating to the racially inspired booing of Sydney Swans champion player Adam Goodes. Pridham was highly outspoken, condemning what he saw as blatant racism. He made a number of strong speeches on the issue and was widely quoted in the press defending Goodes and chiding those he saw as racist, disrespectful or downplaying the significance of the issue of racism in Australian society.

== Awards and recognition ==
In the 2019 Australia Day Honours Pridham was made an Officer of the Order of Australia (AO) for "distinguished service to the investment banking and asset management sector, to sporting groups, and to philanthropy."
