= Mary Galea =

Australian scientist

Professor Mary Galea AM FAHMS
- Born: 1951 (age 74–75)
- Citizenship: Australian
- Education: University of Melbourne
- Awards: Victorian Honour Roll, 2014 Member of the Order of Australia, 2019
- Scientific career
- Fields: Neuroscience, physiotherapy, rehabilitation
- Workplaces: The University of Melbourne

Mary Pauline Galea (born 1951) is an Australian physiotherapist and neuroscientist at University of Melbourne. She resides in Melbourne, Australia. Galea is a professorial fellow at the University of Melbourne's Department of Medicine at the Royal Melbourne Hospital and a Senior Principal Fellow in the Florey Institute of Neurosciences and Mental Health. She was a foundation professor of clinical physiotherapy and director of the Rehabilitation Sciences Research Centre at the University of Melbourne and Austin Health. She is internationally recognised for her work in spinal cord injury and rehabilitative interventions.

== Education ==
- Graduate Diploma in Epidemiological Biostatistics, University of Melbourne (2005)
- Graduate Certificate in Clinical Trials Management, University of Canberra (2000)
- Doctor of Philosophy, University of Melbourne (1992)
- Bachelor of Arts, University of Melbourne (1987)
- Graduate Diploma of Physiotherapy (Neuro), Lincoln (1987)
- Graduate Diploma in Neuroscience, Lincoln (1986)
- Bachelor of Applied Science, Physiotherapy, Lincoln (1978)
- Diploma in Physiotherapy, Lincoln (1972)

== Work ==
Galea established the Rehabilitation Sciences Research Centre in 2004, where she acted as director. Her research focused on interventions for the promotion of recovery after spinal cord injury. In 2009, Galea led a series of multi-site clinical trials investigating exercise as an intervention to improve hand function and aid recovery after spinal cord injury. The five year 'Spinal Cord Injury & Physical Activity (SCIPA) program was funded as part of the Victorian Neurotrauma Initiative, and was designed to examine the impact of exercise in spinal cord rehabilitation. Seven spinal Units were established across Australia and New Zealand, implementing randomised controlled clinical trials of novel rehabilitation strategies directed at neuromuscular activation of lower limbs.

Galea was instrumental in establishing the Royal Melbourne Hospital's Hand Hub, with funding by the Department of Health. The Hand Hub uses robotic devices, sensors and gaming technology to provide intensive hand and arm therapy to patients for rehabilitation following stroke or other neurological injury.

== Awards and honours ==
Galea has held honorary professorships The University of Sydney, Discipline of Exercise and Sport Science, The University of Queensland, School of Health and Rehabilitative Sciences, Brisbane, Australia (2011–2013). She was adjunct professor at James Cook University, School of Public Health, Tropical Medicine and Rehabilitation Sciences, Townsville, Australia from 2010 to 2013. She is adjunct professor at Victoria University, Institute of Sport, Exercise and Active Living. She is a chief investigator in the Spinal Research Institute.

In 2007, Galea was awarded the prestigious Churchill Fellowship, by the Winston Churchill Memorial Trust. To mark International Women's Day, in 2014, Galea was inducted into the Victorian Honour Roll of Women by former Victorian Premier Denis Napthine and the former Minister for Women's Affairs, Heidi Victoria.

Galea was made a Member of the Order of Australia (AM) in the 2019 Australia Day Honours for "significant service to medical education in the field of clinical physiotherapy, and to professional associations".

In 2020 Galea was elected Fellow of the Australian Academy of Health and Medical Sciences.
