= Michael Gandy (cricketer) =

Australian cricketer (born 1944)

Personal information
- Full name: Michael George Gandy
- Born: 28 August 1944 (age 82); Hobart, Tasmania, Australia
- Nickname: Mahatma
- Batting: Left-handed
- Bowling: Right-arm fast-medium

Domestic team information
- Years: Team
- 1969: Tasmania

Umpiring information
- WTests umpired: 1 (1985)
- FC umpired: 6 (1985–1989)
- LA umpired: 1 (1988)

Career statistics
Competition	FC
Matches	1
Runs scored	0
Batting average	0
100s/50s	0/0
Top score	0
Balls bowled	128
Wickets	1
Bowling average	112
5 wickets in innings	0
10 wickets in match	0
Best bowling	1/66
Catches/stumpings	0/0
- Source: CricketArchive (subscription required), 15 January 2022

Michael George Gandy OAM (born 28 August 1944) is an Australian former cricketer. He played one first-class match for Tasmania in a tour match against West Indies in January 1969. He later became an umpire, officiating in one Women's Test, six first-class matches and one List A cricket match.

Gandy was awarded the Medal of the Order of Australia (OAM) in the 2019 Australia Day Honours for service to cricket. He served as a Cricket Tasmania board member for 16 years and helped found the Tasmanian cricket museum. He has also written or compiled several books of Tasmanian cricket history, including History of the Development of Tasmanian Cricket Association First Class Cricket Grounds 1832-2002 (2002), Break O'Day: A Cricket Anthology: A Celebration of the 20th Anniversary of the ACS Tasmania (2008), Break O'Day: Cricket Anthology 2: Celebrating the 25th Anniversary of the ACS Tasmania's Newsletter (2017) and Tigers Roar: Celebrating 150 Years of the Tasmanian Cricket Association (2015, with Ric Finlay and Rick Smith).
