= Patrick Troy =

Australian academic

- Born: 22 January 1936; Geraldton, Western Australia
- Died: 24 July 2018 (aged 82)

Patrick Nicol Troy AC (22 January 1936 – 24 July 2018) was an Australian academic who served as Vale Professor Emeritus at Australian National University. He was born in Geraldton, Western Australia, the eldest son of Patrick Laurence Troy and Mabel Nielson, who had married in the previous year.

Troy was raised in Fremantle and trained as a civil engineer. Before joining academia, he was secretary of the Maritime Services Union in Perth and a founder of the Trades and Labour Council of Western Australia. He joined the faculty of Australian National University in 1965 and retired in 2011. Over the course of his career, Troy was named an Officer of the Order of Australia and granted fellowship by the Academy of Social Sciences in Australia. He became Deputy Secretary in the Federal Department of Urban and Regional Development in the Whitlam government. He died in Canberra on 24 July 2018.

He held public appointments including Deputy Chairman of the Australian Housing Corporation 1984-1992, Member of the Australian Housing Council 1995, Member of the Board of Inquiry into the Administration of Leasehold in the Australian Capital Territory 2003-2006 and Member of the ACT Planning and Land Council.

Troy was made a Companion of the Order of Australia (AC) posthumously in the 2019 Australia Day Honours for "eminent service to urban and regional planning, to environmental sustainability and social justice policy, and as a mentor and role model".

== Bibliography ==
Year	Title	Publisher
1975	The Cost of Collisions (co-written with N. G. Butlin.) ISBN 070151339X	Cheshire
1978	A Fair Price: the Land Commission Program, 1972-1977 ISBN 0908094159	Hale & Iremonger
1978	Federal Power in Australia ISBN 0908094043, 0908094124	Hale & Iremonger
1981	Innovation and Reaction: The life and death of the Federal Department of Urban and Regional Development. (co-written with Clement John Lloyd) ISBN 0868613940	George Allen & Unwin
1981	A Just Society?: Essays on Equity in Australia (editor) ISBN 0868612421	Allen & Unwin
1992	For the Public Health: The Hunter District Water Board 1892-1992 (co-written with Clement John Lloyd & Shelley R. Schreiner) ISBN 0521484375	Cambridge University Press
1992	The New Feudalism	Cambridge University Press
1995	Australian Cities: issues, strategies and policies for urban Australia in the 1990s (editor) ISBN 0521484375	Cambridge University Press
1996	The Perils of Urban Consolidation: a Discussion of Australian Housing and Urban Development Policies. ISBN 1862872112	Federation Press
2000	A History of European Housing in Australia (editor) ISBN 1862872112	Cambridge University Press
2004	The Structure and Form of the Australian City: Prospects for Improved Urban Planning	Griffith University
2008	Troubled Waters: Confronting the Water Crisis in Australia's Cities (editor) ISBN 1921313846	ANU E Press
2012	Accommodating Australians: Commonwealth Government Involvement in Housing ISBN 1862878749	Federation Press
2012	Equity in the City (editor) ISBN 0868612588	Routledge
