= Judy Raper =

Australian chemical engineer

Professor Judy Raper AM FTSE FRSN
- Born: Judy Agnes Raper; 1954 (age 71–72)
- Education: University of New South Wales
- Scientific career
- Workplaces: University of Cambridge; University of Wollongong; University of Sydney; National Science Foundation
- Thesis: Hydrodynamic mechanisms on industrial sieve trays (1979)
- Website: Judy Raper

Judy Agnes Raper (born 1954) is an Australian chemical engineer and was previously Deputy Vice-Chancellor for Research and Innovation at the University of Wollongong. She has served as a National Science Foundation Director and led the Atomic Energy Research Establishment. She has been Dean & CEO of TEDI-London, a new engineering higher education provider since its incorporation in June, 2019.

== Early life and education ==
Raper was born in Budapest. She settled in Australia in 1957. She earned her undergraduate and PhD degrees at the University of New South Wales in 1976 and 1980 respectively. She worked on distillation columns. She was a postdoctoral researcher at the University of Cambridge, where she worked at the Atomic Energy Research Establishment.

== Research and career ==
Raper was appointed lecturer at the University of Newcastle in 1982. She joined the University of New South Wales in 1986, where she was Head of Chemical Engineering at the University of New South Wales, where she transformed the undergraduate engineering programme. In 1997, Raper was the first woman to be appointed Dean of the Faculty of Engineering at the University of Sydney. Raper left the University of Sydney to join the University of Missouri as the chair of the Chemical and Biological engineering department in 2003. She spent 2006 on secondment at the National Science Foundation. Her research considers the characterisation of particulates and their impact on pollution control. She has focussed on pharmaceutical and medicinal applications of aerosol powders.

Raper was appointed Deputy Vice-Chancellor of Research and Innovation at the University of Wollongong in July 2008, a position she held until December 2018. She has led bids for federal government capital grants worth $135 million. In 2017 Raper was the second woman to win the Australian and New Zealand Federation of Chemical Engineers Chemeca medal, and used her keynote acceptance speak to talk about the need for diversity in engineering. Raper has spoken about the need for gender equality and increased diversity at the University of Wollongong. She appointed Valerie Linton as the Dean of Engineering and Information Sciences in 2018.

Raper is one of the Founding Deans of the PLuS Alliance, a collaboration between the University of New South Wales, Arizona State University and King's College London.

== Awards and honours ==
Her awards and honours include;

- 1998 Avon Spirit of Achievement Award for Science
- 2003 Fellow of the Australian Academy of Technology and Engineering
- 2003 Honorary Fellow of the Engineers Australia
- 2012 Australian Financial Review 100 Women of Influence
- 2017 Australian and New Zealand Federation of Chemical Engineers Chemeca Medal
- 2018 University of New South Wales Ada Lovelace Medal
- 2019 Member of the Order of Australia
- Fellow of the Royal Society of New South Wales

The University of New South Wales hold a Judy Raper Award for Leadership in her honour.
