= Moira Were =

Moira Were is an Australian community leader, public participation practitioner, and local government politician who has been Mayor of the City of Onkaparinga, South Australia, since 2022. In 2019 she was appointed a Member of the Order of Australia (AM) for service to the community of South Australia in the areas of social justice, volunteering, and leadership, including extensive mentoring and support for women in leadership and social enterprise.

Her career spans social work, community development, volunteering, public participation, social enterprise, and local government, with leadership roles at local, state, national, and international levels.

== Early life and background ==
Were was born in Streaky Bay, in regional South Australia and has maintained a lifelong connection to the state. Although her work has included national and international leadership roles, she has consistently focused her efforts on contributing to South Australian communities and civic life.

She was known by her married name Moira Deslandes from 1978 - 2018, under which name she participated in public forums and publications, including the Adelaide Festival of Ideas. She reverted to her family name on the death of her husband.

== Early career and social work ==
Were trained as a social worker and began her career working with individuals, families, and communities experiencing social and economic disadvantage. This early work informed her long-term focus on participation, equity, and systems-level approaches to social change.

== Community, volunteering, and public participation leadership ==
Were has held senior leadership roles across the community and not-for-profit sectors. She was chief executive officer of Volunteering SA and NT, where she led statewide initiatives to strengthen volunteering as a critical component of social infrastructure. In 2007, together with Unions SA, Were developed the world's first agreement between paid and voluntary workers.

She later was Global Executive Director of the International Association for Public Participation, supporting the professionalisation and global application of public participation practice across government, industry, and civil society.

In South Australia, Were has also been the Chair of the Adelaide Diocesan Social Justice Commission with the Catholic Church, contributing to work on social equity, inclusion, and community wellbeing. Her participation in national church forums on social justice and community life has been documented in church and conference records.

== Mentoring, women in leadership, and social enterprise ==
A widely recognised aspect of Were's contribution has been her sustained commitment to mentoring and supporting women in leadership, business, and social enterprise. Over several decades, she has provided formal and informal mentoring to a large number of individuals across South Australia and beyond. At the time of her nomination for the Order of Australia, this mentoring was reported to include regular support to multiple people each week, often provided quietly and without public recognition.

This mentoring contribution was cited as a significant reason for her appointment as a Member of the Order of Australia.

Were has also played a leadership role in gender-lens investing and social enterprise, including as a founder of Chooks SA and The Hen House, initiatives supporting women-led enterprises.

She was also a co-founder of Collab4Good, a social enterprise focused on collaboration for community benefit and social impact. Were remained involved with Collab4Good for approximately eight years, contributing to its development, governance, and mentoring activities in circular economy and inclusion.

Her work in this area has included both local initiatives and engagement with international networks, including Coralus, focused on alternative investment and support models for women entrepreneurs.

== Public conversations and community futures ==
Were has initiated and hosted a range of public conversations and salon series focused on the kinds of futures local communities seek. These included events held in 2017 and 2018 addressing topics such as ageing, libraries, food systems, and community participation.

== Mayor of the City of Onkaparinga ==
Were was elected Mayor of the City of Onkaparinga in 2022. Onkaparinga is the largest local government area in South Australia by population.

She is one of a relatively small number of women mayors in South Australia, and her leadership has been profiled in local, state, and national media.

Moira is a Board Director of the Local Government of SA, and chairs the Greater Adelaide Region of Councils, and is a member of the Audit and Risk Committee and the Adelaide Coastal Councils Network.

She chairs ICLEI Oceania - the local government network for sustainability and is a member of the global governing council

In 2025, the Lord Mayor of Adelaide and ICLEI invited Were to join the delegation to Brazil for the Leaders Summit in Rio and COP 30 in Belem. The trip was the subject of media attention as part of City of Adelaide and Australia's bid to host COP 31.

== Media, writing, and public profile ==
Were has been profiled and interviewed by InDaily, Impact Boom, Startup Daily, Innovations of the World, Women's Agenda, Local Government Focus, Council Magazine, and The Mandarin. She has appeared on podcasts including Tales from the Vale and Day One FM and has contributed articles as an author for Oikoumene Foundation and Australian national news platform Women's Agenda.

== Honours and recognition ==
- Member of the Order of Australia (AM)
- MAICD – Member of the Australian Institute of Company Directors
