= Stuart Wood (lawyer) =

Australian workplace relations barrister

Stuart John Wood AM KC (Born 1967) is an Australian barrister. In 2019, Wood was appointed for Australia Day Honours as a Member in the General Division of the Order of Australia "for significant service to the legal profession, particularly in the area of industrial relations". Wood is a current member of the board of the National Portrait Gallery, non-executive chairman of Great Southern Press, and the Secretary of the Samuel Griffith Society. He first signed the Bar roll on 25 May 1995 and was appointed King's Counsel on 22 November 2011.

His principal chambers are in Melbourne.

== Education ==
In 1992, Wood graduated with a Bachelor of Laws with Honours from the University of Melbourne. Previous to studying the law, Wood had completed a Bachelor of Science, majoring in Chemistry at the same institution.

== Career ==
Wood successfully represented Professor Peter Ridd against James Cook University in 2019. The Federal Circuit Court ordered James Cook University to pay the marine scientist $1.2 million in compensation for what it ruled to be an unlawful sacking. Proponents have claimed this decision to be a historic win for freedom of speech in Australia.

He, together with Eddy Gisonda and Nico Burmeister, represented sacked rugby union player Israel Folau.
