= Lynne Williams (educator) =

Australian musician and educator

Lynette Frances Williams AM

Principal of the Guildhall School of Music and Drama
- In office January 2017 – September 2021
- Preceded by: Sir Barry Ife
- Succeeded by: Jonathan Vaughan

Personal details
- Born: 1947 (age 78–79)
- Education: Sydney Conservatorium of Music
- Occupation: Educator

Lynette Frances Williams AM (born 1947) is an Australian educator and musician who held the position of Principal of the Guildhall School of Music and Drama from 2017 to 2021. Prior to taking up her role at Guildhall, she was CEO of Australia's National Institute of Dramatic Art and was the director of the Culture, Ceremonies and Education Programme for the London 2012 Olympic Games.

== Early life and education ==
Williams was born in Wollongong and completed her secondary schooling at Wollongong High School. She studied for her NSW Teachers Certificate at Wollongong Teachers College. Williams originally trained as a classical singer, completing a Diploma of the State Conservatorium of Music (NSW), majoring in vocal studies (1977), at what is now the Sydney Conservatorium of Music.

== Career ==
Williams was based in the United Kingdom from 1985 until about 2006. During that time she held a range of arts leadership roles. She was Artistic Director of Cardiff 2008, the company that unsuccessfully bid for Cardiff to be 2008 European Capital of Culture.

Williams was Cultural Advisor/Creative Producer for London's successful bid to host the 2012 Summer Olympics. She then led the Culture, Ceremonies and Education Programme for the London Organising Committee of the Olympic and Paralympic Games (LOCOG).

Returning to Australia, from 2008 to 2016 Williams was Director/CEO of Australia's National Institute of Dramatic Art.

Williams returned to the United Kingdom to serve as Principal of the Guildhall School of Music and Drama from 2017 to 2021.

== Awards and honours ==
In 1998 Williams, then Artistic Director of the Eastern Touring Agency, was awarded an Honorary Master of Letters from De Montfort University, for contributions to the arts and arts education.

In 2014 Williams was awarded an Honorary Doctor of Letters by the University of Wollongong "for her scholarship, her service to creative arts at the University of Wollongong and to the Australian and international arts industry, and for her dedication to broadening access to contemporary arts".

In the 2019 Australia Day Honours Williams was appointed Member of the Order of Australia (AM) "for significant service to the performing arts as an administrator and artistic director".
