= Chrissie Foster =

Australian advocate for sexual abuse victims

Chrissie Foster AM
- Born: c. 1955; (70–71 years old)
- Occupation: Public servant
- Known for: Advocate for people impacted by child sexual abuse
- Spouse: Anthony (m. 1980; dec'd 2017)
- Children: 3; including 1 dec'd 2008

Christine "Chrissie" Foster AM (born c. 1955) is an Australian advocate for people impacted by child sexual abuse.

Foster and her late husband, Anthony, raised three daughters in the Melbourne suburb of Oakleigh, Victoria. The children were educated in Catholic schools. Father Kevin O'Donnell, a local Catholic priest, aged in his 70s, was well known by Catholic church hierarchy as a long-term paedophile, who the Church had moved from parish to parish in order to avoid his career of sexual assault on children becoming public. O'Donnell, who lived next door to the Oakleigh Sacred Heart Primary School, sexually abused two of the Fosters' daughters in the 1990s, when they were aged between five and seven years old. The Foster family's case was one of those which prompted establishment of the Victorian Parliamentary Inquiry into the Handling of Child Abuse by Religious and Other Organisations and the subsequent Australian Royal Commission into Institutional Responses to Child Sexual Abuse.

In 2017 Foster was a Local Hero Nominee in Victoria for the Australian of the Year. In 2019, Foster was appointed a Member of the Order of Australia for significant service to children, particularly as an advocate for those who have suffered sexual abuse. Foster's advocacy included fighting for survivors to be allowed in the evidence room to hear the cross examination of Cardinal George Pell in Rome.

Foster is a critic of the Catholic Church's Melbourne Response restorative compensation package for victims of clerical sexual abuse.

== Selected works ==
- Foster, Chrissie; Kennedy, Paul (2011). Hell on the way to Heaven: An Australian mother's love. The power of the Catholic Church. A fight for justice over child sexual abuse. Sydney: Bantam. ISBN 978-1-74275-304-1.
- Morris-Marr, Lucie; Foster, Chrissie (2019). Fallen: the inside story of the secret trial and conviction of Cardinal George Pell. Sydney: Allen & Unwin. ISBN 978-1-76087-605-0.

== See also ==
- Royal Commission into Institutional Responses to Child Sexual Abuse
