= Julie Bernhardt =

Australian physiotherapist

Professor Julie Bernhardt AM FAHMS

Personal details
- Occupation: Physiotherapist

Julie Bernhardt is an Australian physiotherapist and clinician scientist, known for her work in the field of stroke recovery. She has been a principal research fellow and an NHMRC senior research fellow and clinical head of the Stroke Division at the Florey Institute of Neuroscience and Mental Health, University of Melbourne.

As of 2018 Bernhardt is the director of the NHMRC Centre of Research Excellence (CRE) in Stroke Rehabilitation and Brain Repair, a collaboration between the Florey Institute of Neuroscience and Mental Health, the Hunter Medical Research Institute and other institutions. She founded and chaired the international Stroke Recovery and Rehabilitation Roundtable (SRRR), a partnership involving leading stroke experts which aims to advance stroke rehabilitation research. She led the second SRRR in 2018, on developing international clinical trials to improve stroke treatment.

== Early life and education ==
In 1985, Bernhardt completed a Bachelor of Applied Science in Physiotherapy at the Lincoln Institute of Health Sciences in Melbourne.

From 1990 to 1995 she undertook a Masters of Applied Science at La Trobe University, Melbourne, where she also received her PhD in 1999. The focus of her PhD research was on the hemiplegic upper limb, and she developed new methods of testing the accuracy of observational kinematic assessment of upper limb dysfunction.

== Career ==
Bernhardt began work as a physiotherapy research coordinator at Melbourne Health in 1989, then after completing her PhD, she was a senior physiotherapist at the Austin and Royal Melbourne Hospitals from 1999–2008.

She became a professor in neuroscience at La Trobe in 2006. Bernhardt is head of Stroke Division at the Florey Institute of Neuroscience and Mental Health at the University of Melbourne.

=== AVERT ===
In 2004, Bernhardt joined the Florey Institute to become Principal Investigator of the AVERT Early Intervention Research Group. AVERT was the largest acute stroke rehabilitation trial in the world. Over 2000 stroke patients were recruited from 56 acute stroke units in Australia, New Zealand, the United Kingdom, Malaysia, and Singapore from 2006–2014. Within the AVERT group, Bernhardt led a team of over 1000 clinicians and researchers. The trial aimed to identify if receiving very early mobilisation (VEM) within 24 hours of stroke is beneficial for stroke recovery, and if so, how much and what frequency is best. The studies in AVERT focused on understanding how these early exercise-based interventions after stroke may alter bone, muscle and brain. The results of AVERT were presented at the European Stroke Organisation Conference in Glasgow in April 2015. While AVERT was completed in 2016, Bernhardt continued to lead the extension of the trial, AVERT-DOSE (Determining Optimal early rehabilitation after Stroke). This trial tests eight different mobility training regimens to see what dose of mobility training is best early after stroke. AVERT-DOSE is recruiting over 2500 patients in six countries: Australia, New Zealand, the United Kingdom, Malaysia, Singapore, and India.

== Boards and other activities ==
From 2006 to 2014, Bernhardt was a non-executive director for the National Stroke Foundation. She has been on the Steering Committee of the Australian Stroke Research Network since 2011 and from 2013–16, she was co-chair for Australasian Stroke Trials Network.

In 2015, Bernhardt became a director of the NHMRC Centre of Research Excellence in Stroke Rehabilitation, which aims to accelerate discovery and translation in the field of stroke rehabilitation She was chair of the research committee for the World Federation of Neurorehabilitation from 2016 to 2020. Bernhardt has been on the board of the World Stroke Organisation since July 2014 and Chair of the research committee of WSO since April 2017.

She founded and lead the first Stroke Recovery and Rehabilitation Roundtable in 2017, which brings together researchers, clinicians, funders and consumers to identify key stroke research priority areas. Three roundtables have met and published statements providing consensus on research and critical needs; papers were published in 2017, 2019 and 2023. The 2025 roundtable was held in Aberdeen Scotland.

=== Advocacy ===
In 2013, Bernhardt founded the Women in Science Parkville Precinct (WiSPP) Collective Impact initiative to address the gender inequity that she had witnessed in medical research. This initiative aims to improve the systems that limit the advancement of women and diversity of leadership across five of Melbourne's medical research institutes. Bernhardt was invited to talk at the 2016 World Economic Forum in Tianjin, China about gender equity and is also an author on a paper about gender equity in Stroke Society of Australasia.

== Awards and honours ==
- Winston Churchill Memorial Fellowship (2012)
- The Australian Financial Review and Westpac 100 Women of Influence Award, Global category winner (2016)
- Austin Medical Research Foundation Distinguished Scientist (2016)
- American Heart Association Stroke Rehabilitation Award (2016)
- Viscount Linley Award, Stroke Association (2016)
- Chief Executive Women Scholarship MIT Sloan (2016)
- Princess Margaret Memorial Lecture invitee, Stroke Association UK (2015)
- National Australia Bank Change Champion of the Year (2015)
- Honorary Life Membership, Stroke Foundation Australia (2018)
- Member of the Order of Australia (2019) "for significant service to medical research, and as an advocate for women in science"
- Fellow of the Australian Academy of Health and Medical Sciences (2020)

== Publications ==
Bernhardt has published 345 scholarly works, most in the field of stroke rehabilitation.

== Personal life ==
As of 2014 Bernhardt lived in Melbourne with her husband and teenage son.
