= Stephanie Woollard =

Australian activist and businesswoman

Stephanie Bridget Woollard is an Australian social entrepreneur who is the founder of Seven Women, a social enterprise based in Nepal that provides skills training and employment for women with disabilities and other marginalised groups. She has received the Medal of the Order of Australia and the Rotary International Responsible Business Award for her work in community development.

== Early life and education ==
Woollard was born in Melbourne, Australia. She developed an interest in community development during her early adulthood. At the age of 22, she visited Kathmandu, where she met a group of seven women with disabilities producing handicrafts for income.

She later studied at Uppsala University in Sweden as a Rotary Peace Fellow, completing a master's degree in Peace and Conflict Studies in 2015.

== Career ==
Woollard founded Seven Women in 2006 as a vocational training initiative for women with disabilities in Nepal. The organisation expanded from handicraft production to include literacy classes, skills training, and employment programs. By the late 2010s, Seven Women had trained or supported more than 5,000 women across Nepal, according to independent media reporting.

Woollard founded The Celtic Way, a travel company offering cultural tours related to Irish heritage. She has spoken publicly about the development of the business, including in an interview with Clare FM.

== Recognition and awards ==
- Rotary International Responsible Business Award, presented at the United Nations Headquarters in 2016.
- Medal of the Order of Australia (OAM), awarded in 2019 for service to the international community through humanitarian aid.
- Ten Outstanding Young Persons of the World (JCI TOYP), listed in 2019 for humanitarian and voluntary leadership.

== Speaking engagements ==
Woollard has participated in international development and peacebuilding events. In 2018, she spoke at Rotary International's Presidential Peacebuilding Summit in Toronto, where practitioners discussed peace and community development.

== Publications ==
Woollard is the author of From a Tin Shed to the United Nations, a memoir that describes the origin and development of Seven Women.
