= Pantjiti Unkari McKenzie =

Australian artist

Pantjiti Unkari McKenzie OAM (born 1941 or 1942) is a senior Pitjantjatjara woman from the Anangu Pitjantjatjara Yankunytjatjara (APY) Lands. She has worked as an artist, film maker, actor, teacher, oral historian and recorder of cultural heritage, Ngangkari and as a senior law woman in her community. In 2019, she was awarded the Order of Australia Medal for her “service to the Indigenous community of the Northern Territory”.

== Professional work ==
McKenzie is an artist skilled in painting, batik, wood and glass sculpture, and tjanpi (native grass) weaving.

Together with her husband, she set up EVTV in the 1980s, the first indigenous media organisation in Australia, and made films on many subjects. It is estimated that they made over one thousand films, including documenting the Lands Rights movement. They also worked for PY Media on the Broadcasting for Remote Aboriginal Community Services (BRACS) program.

McKenzie teaches Pitjantjatjara language.

She is a senior law woman and traditional healer specialising in women's health.

Her work in archiving and sharing knowledge around cultural heritage is renowned. She has worked with the NPY Women's Council, including as part of the Uti Kulintjaku team, which was involved in the creation of meditations recorded in Pitjantjatjara and Ngaanyatjarra languages to be included in the Smiling Mind meditation app.

== Appearances ==
- Language in the Land: Pitjantjatjara
- Campfire Stories

== Personal life ==
McKenzie was born near the Blackstone Ranges in Western Australia and has spent much of her life living in Pukatja (Ernabella) community.
