= List of companions of the Order of Australia =

The Order of Australia is the only Australian order of chivalry. It was established on 14 February 1975 by Elizabeth II, Queen of Australia, to recognise Australian citizens and other persons for achievement, meritorious service, or for both. At that time, Companion of the Order of Australia was the highest of three grades of the order (companion, officer, member).

On 24 May 1976, the grade of Knight or Dame of the Order was established, displacing companion as the highest grade. On 3 June 1986, the knight/dame grade was abolished, and companion was once again the highest grade.

On 25 March 2014, the knight/dame grade was re-established, companion once again being relegated to the second highest grade of the order. The knight/dame grade was again abolished on 2 November 2015.

== Divisions ==
The order has two divisions: general and military. In general, recipients who are not Australian citizens are appointed honorary companions, though there have been certain exceptions. (For example, Prince Philip's appointment as AC (mil.) was substantive.)

== Knights and dames ==
Seven companions have later been promoted to knight or dame of the Order of Australia: Sir John Kerr, Sir Gordon Jackson, Dame Quentin Bryce, Sir Peter Cosgrove, Dame Marie Bashir, Sir Angus Houston and Prince Philip, Duke of Edinburgh.

== Australian companions ==
=== General Division ===
Name	Born	Died	Notability	Awarded	Notes
Tony Abbott	1957	–	Politician. Prime Minister (2013–2015)	2020 Q	
Sir Peter Abeles	1924	1999	Transportation magnate, founder of Thomas Nationwide Transport	1991 A	
Phillip Adams	1939	–	Broadcaster, writer and public intellectual	2025 K	
Frances Adamson	1961	–	Diplomat and public servant, Governor of South Australia	2021 Q	
Ross Adler	1944	2025	Managing director Santos 1986–2000, Chair of Adelaide Festival Corporation Board 2005–, Chairman of Austrade	2007 Q	
Dr Susan Alberti	1947	–	Businesswoman and philanthropist	2016 A	
Martin Albrecht	1939	–	Chairman, previously CEO (1985–2000), of Thiess, etc.	2002 Q	
Lucette Aldous	1938	2021	Ballerina and ballet teacher	2018 A	
James Allsop	1953	–	Chief Justice of the Federal Court of Australia	2023 A	
Prof Rose Amal	1965	–	Chemical engineer	2018 Q	
Prof Brian Anderson	1941	–	Academic (information and communications technology), President of the International Federation of Automatic Control 1990-93	2016 Q	
John Anderson	1956	_	Politician, 11th Deputy Prime Minister of Australia	2022 Q	
Dame Judith Anderson	1897	1992	Stage and film actress	1991 Q	
Prof Kym Anderson	1950	–	Academic (agricultural economics)	2015 Q	
Daniel Andrews	1972	–	Politician, 48th Premier of Victoria	2024 K	
Doug Anthony	1929	2020	Politician, National Party Leader 1971–84, Deputy Prime Minister 1971–72 and 1975–83	2003 Q	
Sir Tristan Antico	1923	2004	Founder of Pioneer Concrete; champion horse breeder	1983 A	
Don Argus	1938	–	Philanthropist, businessman	2010 A	
John Armstrong	1908	1977	Senator 1937–62, minister, Lord Mayor of Sydney, High Commissioner to the United Kingdom	1977 A	
Maj Gen Peter Arnison	1940	–	Land Commander Australia 1994–96, Governor of Queensland 1997–2003	2001-03-30	
Austin Asche	1925	2024	Chief Justice of the Supreme Court of the Northern Territory 1987–93, Administrator of the Northern Territory 1993–97	1994 A	
Phillip Aspinall	1959	–	Anglican Archbishop of Brisbane	2021 Q	
Tony Ayers	1933	2016	Secretary of Departments of Aboriginal Affairs, Social Security, Community Services, Community Services and Health and Defence; Chairman of Canberra Raiders football team	1993 A	
Jim Bacon	1950	2004	Premier of Tasmania 1998–2004	2005 Q	
Barbara Baker	1958	–	Judge, Governor of Tasmania	2021 Q	
Sir James Balderstone	1921	2014	Chairman of AMP, Chairman of BHP, Deputy Chairman of Westpac, etc.	1992 A	
William Ball	1901	1986	Academic and diplomat	1978 Q	
Faith Bandler	1920	2015	Indigenous Australian and South Sea Islander Rights campaigner and activist	2009 A	
Colin Barnett	1950	–	Premier of Western Australia 2008–2017	2023 K	
Prof Dame Marie Bashir	1930	2026	Governor of New South Wales 2001–14; in 2014 she was promoted to Dame of the Order of Australia (AD)	2001-03-30	
Justice Tom Bathurst	1948	–	Chief Justice of the Supreme Court of New South Wales 2011–present	2014 Q	
Prof Peter Baume	1935	–	Politician and cabinet minister; gastroenterologist; physician; clinical lecturer; Chancellor of the Australian National University; etc.	2008 Q	
Peter Beattie	1952	–	Premier of Queensland 1998–2007	2012 Q	
Dame Beryl Beaurepaire	1923	2018	Chairman of the Council of the Australian War Memorial	1991 Q	
Kim Beazley	1948	–	Politician, Leader of the Opposition, Minister	2009 A	
Margaret Beazley	1951	–	Governor of New South Wales	2020 A	
Tony Beddison	1948	2020	Businessman, Philanthropist	2016 Q	
Franco Belgiorno-Nettis	1915	2006	Co-founder of the construction and engineering company Transfield	1997 A	
Virginia Bell	1951	–	Justice of the High Court of Australia	2012 A	
Annabelle Bennett	1950	–	Chancellor, Bond University, Federal Court judge	2019 Q	
Dr David Bennett	1941	–	SJD, KC, Barrister, Commonwealth Solicitor-General 1998–2008	2008 Q	
Prof Dame Valerie Beral	1946	2022	Epidemiologist	2010 Q	
Prof Samuel Berkovic	1953	–	Neurologist, Laureate Professor of Medicine, University of Melbourne	2014 A	
Marcus Besen	1923	2023	Expanded the Sussan retail chain, Philanthropist, Life Governor of the Australian National Gallery Foundation	2015 A	
Morrish Besley	1927	–	Engineer, businessman, senior public servant, Chairman of the Commonwealth Bank (1988–1999)	2002 A	
Jill Elizabeth Bilcock	1948	–	Film editor	2018 Q	
Prof Arthur Birch	1915	1995	Organic chemist	1987 A	
Ruth Bishop	1933	2022	Virologist	2019 Q	
Sir Hermann Black	1904	1990	Economist, schoolteacher, academic, government advisor, radio broadcaster, public-affairs commentator and Chancellor of the University of Sydney in the 1970s and 1980s.	1986 Q	
Michael Black	1940	–	Chief Justice of the Federal Court of Australia	1998 A	
Prof Ruthven Blackburn	1913	2016	For service to the development of academic medicine and medical education in Australia	2006 A	
Elizabeth Blackburn	1948	–	Scientist, Nobel laureate	2010 A	
Prof Geoffrey Blainey	1930	–	Historian	2000 A	
Cate Blanchett	1969	–	Two time Academy Award-winning actress (2005, 2014), environmentalist and humanitarian	2017 Q	
Dr Neal Blewett	1933	–	Academic, Professor; Politician, Cabinet Minister 1983–93; High Commissioner to the United Kingdom 1994–98; etc.	1995 Q	
Anna Bligh	1960	–	Premier of Queensland from 2007 to 2012	2017 A	
David Block	1936	2021	In recognition of service to governments and government administration	1988 Q	
David Boger	1939	2025	Chemical engineer known for his studies of non-Newtonian fluids	2024 A	
Richard Bonynge	1930	–	Operatic conductor	2012 A	
Kym Bonython	1920	2011	Entrepreneur, art collector, Chairman of the SA Jubilee 150 Board, etc.	1987 A	
Peter Botten	?	–	Oil and gas executive	2019 A	
Lionel Bowen	1922	2012	Solicitor, council alderman and mayor, politician 1962–90, Deputy Prime Minister 1983–90	1991 A	
Sir Nigel Bowen	1911	1994	Solicitor, barrister, judge; politician, Attorney-General, Cabinet Minister.	1988 A	
Emeritus Prof Caroline Bower	?	–	Epidemiologist, professor at the University of Western Australia	2023 K	
Arthur Boyd	1920	1999	Artist	1992 Q	
Steve Bracks	1954	–	Premier of Victoria from 1999 to 2007	2010 Q	
Prof Denise Bradley	1942	2020	Higher education administrator; Vice-chancellor University of South Australia; Bradley Review of Higher Education (2008)	2008 A	
Sir Donald Bradman	1908	2001	Cricketer	1979 Q	
Catherine Margaret Branson	1948	–	Former judge and president of the Australian Human Rights Commission	2018 Q	
Dr John Jefferson Bray	1912	1995	LL.D., poet, lawyer, academic, and Chief Justice of the Supreme Court of South Australia 1967–78	1979 Q	
Sir Gerard Brennan	1928	2022	Chief Justice of the High Court 1995–98	1988 A	
Jillian Broadbent	1948	–	Businesswoman	2019 A	
Em Prof Ted Brown	1938	–	For service to the engineering profession as a world expert in the field of rock mechanics	2001 A	
Robert Hanbury Brown	1916	2002	Astronomer and physicist	1986 Q	
Prof Richard Bryant	1960	–	Medical researcher (psychotraumatology)	2016 Q	
Dame Quentin Bryce	1942	–	First woman admitted to the Queensland bar; Governor of Queensland; first woman Governor-General of Australia; in 2014 she was promoted to Dame of the Order of Australia (AD)	2003-04-30	
Sir John Bunting	1918	1995	Secretary, Department of the Prime Minister 1959–68 & 1971–75; High Commissioner to the United Kingdom 1975–77	1982 A	
Antony Burgess	1946	–	Researcher into the early diagnosis and treatment of cancer	1998 Q	
David Burke	1944	–	Neurophysiologist	2019 Q	
Sharan Burrow	1954	–	Industrial relations and human rights	2019 Q	
Eva Burrows	1929	2015	13th General (world leader) of the Salvation Army	1994 A	
Geoffrey Burnstock	1929	2020	Neurobiologist	2018 Q	
Sir Francis Burt	1918	2004	Queen's Counsel; Chief Justice of Western Australia 1977–88; Governor of Western Australia 1990–93	1988 Q	
Richard Butler	1942	–	Diplomat; UN weapons inspector; Governor of Tasmania 2003–04	2003-09-05	
Noel Butlin	1921	1991	Education, particularly in the study of economic growth	1991 Q	
Ita Buttrose	1942	–	Journalist and businesswoman	2019 Q	
Roger Byard	1955–1956	–	Forensic pathologist, academic and medical researcher	2025 K	
Ed Byrne	1952	–	Neuroscientist, Vice-Chancellor of Monash University (2009–2014), etc.	2014 A	
Stella Bywaters	1919	2009	For service to the international community, during an unsafe and dangerous period in Uganda, through the provision of humanitarian aid and nursing care to improve the lives of the sick, poor and dispossessed and to the Salvation Army	2005 Q	
Dr Jean Calder	c.1937	2022	For humanitarian service in the Middle East; Bio	2005 A	
Sir Bernard Callinan	1913	1995	In recognition of service to the Public Service and the community	1986 A	
Ian Callinan	1937	–	Justice of the High Court of Australia 1998–2007	2003 A	
Ashton Calvert	1945	2007	For service to the development of Australian foreign policy	2003 A	
Prof Enid Campbell	1932	2010	Distinguished legal scholar, first female professor and Dean of a law school	2005 A	
Sir Walter Campbell	1921	2004	Chief Justice of the Supreme Court of Queensland 1982–85, Governor of Queensland 1985–92	1989 A	
Karen Canfell	?	–	Epidemiologist and cancer researcher	2024 K	
Les Carlyon	1942	2019	Writer, historian	2014 Q	
Sir Roderick Carnegie	1932	2024	Businessman, primarily working in the coal industry	2003 Q	
Rev Dr Peter Carnley	1937	–	Anglican Bishop, Archbishop of Perth 1981–2005, Primate of the Anglican Church of Australia 2000–05	2007 Q	
Sir John Carrick	1918	2018	Politician, senator 1971–83, minister 1975–83	2008 A	
Lady (Maie) Casey	1892	1983	Pioneer aviator, poet, librettist, biographer, memoirist and artist; wife of Governor-General Lord Casey	1982 A	
Cardinal Edward Cassidy	1924	2021	Roman Catholic cardinal priest 1991, president emeritus of the Pontifical Council for Promoting Christian Unity within the Vatican	1990 Q	
John Philip Chalmers	1937	–	In recognition of services to medical science, particularly in the field of cardiovascular physiology	1991 Q	
Robert Champion de Crespigny	1950	–	For service to the mining industry, to business, and to the community in the areas of cultural preservation and education	2002 Q	
Dr Victor Chang	1936	1991	Cardiothoracic surgeon and pioneer of modern organ transplantation	1986 A	
Prof Jeremy Chapman	1953	–	Nephrologist, Renal physician, Transplant surgeon	2015 A	
Alex Chernov	1938	–	Governor of Victoria	2012 A	
Prof Ian Chubb	1943	–	Vice Chancellor and President of the Australian National University 2001–2011	2006 Q	
Cardinal Edward Clancy	1923	2014	Catholic Archbishop of Sydney 1983–2001	1992 A	
Prof Graeme Clark	1935	–	Developed the Cochlear implant	2004 A	
Dr Gregory John Clark	1943	–	Physicist	2018 A	
Sir Lindesay Clark	1896	1986	Technical Managing Director Western Mining Corporation 1933–1962	1975 Q	
Prof Manning Clark	1915	1991	Historian	1975 Q	
Dr Megan Clark	?	–	Geologist, chief executive officer of the CSIRO 2009-2014	2014 Q	
Prof Adrienne Clarke	1938	–	Scientist, academic and researcher	2004 A	
Dist Prof Judith Clements	?	–	Biological scientist	2015 Q	
Leigh Clifford	1948	–	Businessman	2022 Q	
John Coates	1950	–	President of the Australian Olympic Committee	2006 Q	
Mike Codd	1939	–	Secretary to the Department of the Prime Minister and Cabinet	1991 A	
Prof Peter Colman	1944	–	Medical researcher (structural biology)	2017 Q	
David Albert Cooper	1949	2018	HIV/AIDS researcher, immunologist, professor at the University of New South Wales	2018 Q	
Max Corden	1927	2023	Economist	2001 A	
Prof Sir John Cornforth	1917	2013	Scientist, 1975 Nobel Prize in Chemistry	1991 A	
Margaret Court	1942	–	Tennis player	2021 A	
Suzanne Cory	1942	–	Biomedical researcher	1999 A	
Peter Costello	1957	–	Lawyer, politician, cabinet minister, etc.	2011 A	
Richard Court	1947	–	Premier of Western Australia	2003 Q	
Alan Cowman	1954	–	Malaria researcher	2019 Q	
William Cox	1936	–	Chief Justice of the Supreme Court of Tasmania 1995–2004, Governor of Tasmania 2004–2008	1999 Q	
Prof Brendan Crabb	1966	–	Research scientist, Director and chief executive officer, The Macfarlane Burnet Institute for Medical Research and Public Health	2015 A	
Ewan Crawford	1941	–	Chief Justice of the Supreme Court of Tasmania 2008-2013	2014 Q	
James Crawford	1948	2021	Academic and practitioner in the field of public international law.	2013 Q	
Sir John Crawford	1910	1984	For eminent and meritorious public service and services to commerce, industry, trade, agriculture, learning and international relations	1978 A	
Simon Crean	1949	2023	Australian politician and trade unionist	2024 K	
Justice Susan Crennan	1945	–	Justice of the High Court of Australia	2008 A	
Michael Crouch	1933	2018	Industrialist, philanthropist	2017 Q	
MajGen Paul Cullen	1909	2007	Decorated field commander in World War II, founding President of Austcare, founder of Mainguard merchant bank	1988 A	
Charles Curran	1938	–	For service to business and commerce	2006 Q	
David Curtis	1927	2017	In recognition of service to medicine and science, particularly in the fields of research and administration	1992 A	
Betty Cuthbert	1938	2017	Olympic champion athlete	2018 A	
Helen Cutler	1923	1990	For public and community service to the people of New South Wales	1980 Q	
Douglas Daft	1943	–	CEO of Coca-Cola Amatil 2000–04	2005 Q	
Dist Prof James Dale	?	–	Agricultural scientist	2022 A	
Leonard Gordon Darling	1921	2015	For service to the arts through vision, advice and philanthropy	2004 A	
Marilyn Ann Darling	1943	–	For service to the development, advancement and growth of visual arts	2009 A	
Jack Davenport	1920	1996	For service to business and industry and to the community	1991 Q	
David David	1940	–	Craniofacial surgeon	1988 A	
Glyn Davis	1959	–	Academic; Vice-Chancellor of the University of Melbourne	2002 A	
Chris Dawson	?	–	Governor of Western Australia	2023 A	
Sir Daryl Dawson	1933	–	Justice of the High Court of Australia 1982–97	1988 A	
Paul de Jersey	1948	–	KC, Chief Justice of the Supreme Court of Queensland, Governor of Queensland	2000 Q	
Prof David de Kretser	1939	–	Medical researcher; Governor of Victoria 2006–2011	2006 Q	
Sir William Deane	1931	–	Justice of the High Court of Australia 1982–95; Governor-General 1996–2001	1988 A	
Dr Elizabeth Dennis	1943	–	Plant molecular biologist	2019 A	
Prof Derek Denton	1924	2022	Scientist renowned for his research exploring the nature of consciousness in animals	2005 A	
Sir Peter Derham	1925	2008	Businessman and philanthropist	2001 A	
Linda Dessau	1953	–	Governor of Victoria 2015-; Judge, Family Court of Australia 1995-2013	2017 A	
Prof Peter Doherty	1940	–	Veterinary surgeon, medical researcher, 1996 Nobel Prize in Physiology or Medicine, 1997 Australian of the Year	1997 A	
Alexander Downer	1951	–	Politician, longest-serving Minister for Foreign Affairs (1996–2007), etc.	2013 A	
Reg Downing	1904	1994	In recognition of service to politics and government	1979 Q	
John Doyle	1945	–	KC, Chief Justice of the Supreme Court of South Australia	2002 Q	
Robert Doyle	1953	–	State Politician (Victoria), Lord Mayor of Melbourne	2017 Q	
Sir Russell Drysdale	1912	1981	Artist	1980 Q	
Sir Edward "Weary" Dunlop	1907	1993	Surgeon, Army Officer, Prisoner of War	1987 Q	
Ross Dunning	1942	–	For service to the development of transport systems, particularly the development of modern and efficient rail services, to the export economy, to the construction industry, and to the community through support for cultural activities and charitable organisations	2002 A	
Don Dunstan	1926	1999	QC, Premier of South Australia 1967–68 & 1970–79	1979 Q	
LtGen Sir Donald Dunstan	1923	2011	Chief of the General Staff 1977–82, Governor of South Australia 1982–91	1991 A	
Max Dupain	1911	1992	Photographer	1992 A	
Dame Mary Durack	1913	1994	Author, historian	1989 Q	
Sir John Eccles	1903	1997	Neurophysiologist, 1963 Nobel Prize in Physiology or Medicine	1990 A	
Sir Llew Edwards	1935	2021	Deputy Premier of Queensland 1978–83, Chancellor of the University of Queensland 1993–2009	1989 A	
Prof Nathan Efron	1954	–	Researcher (clinical optometry), President of the Australian College of Optometry 2012-	2015 Q	
Bob Ellicott	1927	2022	Politician	2017 A	
Herb Elliott	1938	–	Olympic athlete	2002 Q	
Sr Mary Bernice Elphick	1921	2008	For service to medicine and to the community as a pioneer in the development of health care and as a driving force in the success of the multi-disciplinary initiatives established at St Vincent's Private Hospital, Sydney.	2006 A	
Roy Emerson	1936	–	World No. 1 tennis player	2019 A	
Ted Evans	1941	2020	Economic policy development	1999 Q	
Prof Gareth Evans	1944	–	Minister for Foreign Affairs 1988–1996	2012 Q	
Elizabeth Evatt	1933	–	Chief Judge of the Family Court of Australia and the first female judge of an Australian Federal Court	1995 Q	
John Fahey	1945	2020	Politician 1984–2001, Premier of New South Wales 1992–95, Federal Minister for Finance 1996–2001	2002 A	
Gina Fairfax			Philanthropist	2022 Q	
James Fairfax	1933	2017	Businessman, philanthropist	2010 A	
Lady (Mary) Fairfax	1922	2017	Philanthropist	2005 A	
Timothy Vincent Fairfax	1946	–	Australian philanthropist, as a major supporter of the visual arts	2014 A	
Prof Sir Marc Feldmann	1944	–	Immunologist, researcher (chronic immune disease)	2014 Q	
Prof Mike Fellows	1952	–	Academic (computer science)	2016 Q	
Frank Fenner	1914	2010	Virologist	1989 A	
Charles Fenton	1912	2009	In recognition of service to the Parliament of Tasmania and to the community	1982 A	
Bill Ferris	1942	–	For service to the community through a range of philanthropic endeavours, as a leader in support of medical research, and to business and commerce through ongoing roles supporting Australian exports, venture capital and private equity	2008 A	
Michael Field	1948	–	Premier of Tasmania	2003 Q	
Dr Alan Finkel	1953	–	Neuroscientist, Chief Scientist of Australia (2016–20)	2022 A	
John Finnis	1940	–	Legal philosopher	2019 Q	
Tim Fischer	1946	2019	Politician, National Party of Australia leader 1990–99, Deputy Prime Minister of Australia 1996–99, etc.	2005 A	
Kaarene Fitzgerald	1945	2003	Founder and executive director of SIDS and Kids	1999 A	
Tony Fitzgerald	1941	–	KC, Judge of the Federal Court 1981–84, best known for the Fitzgerald Inquiry into corruption 1987–89, etc.	1991 A	
Frank Flynn	1906	2000	In recognition of service to medicine, particularly through research into Aboriginal eye health and to the community	1993 A	
Leneen Forde	1935	–	Chancellor of Griffith University 2000–15, Governor of Queensland 1992–97	1993 A	
Lindsay Fox	1937	–	Transportation magnate	2008 A	
Russell Fox	1920	2013	In recognition of service to the law and to government	1989 Q	
Dawn Fraser	1937	–	Australian freestyle champion swimmer	2018 Q	
Malcolm Fraser	1930	2015	22nd Prime Minister of Australia 1975–83, chair of Care International	1988 Q	
Prof Ian Frazer	1953	–	Creator of the HPV vaccine against cervical cancer	2012 Q	
Prof Ken Freeman	1940	–	Astronomer and astrophysicist	2017 Q	
Robert French	1947	–	Chief Justice of the High Court	2010 A	
Dame Phyllis Frost	1917	2004	Welfare worker and philanthropist, known for her commitment to unpopular causes, most notably helping women prisoners	1992 A	
Prof John Funder	1940	–	Medical researcher, executive director, Obesity Australia	2015 A	
Justice Stephen Gageler	1958	–	Justice of the High Court of Australia 2012-; Solicitor-General of Australia from 2008 to 2012	2017 A	
Peter Gago	1957	–	Winemaker	2017 Q	
Rhonda Galbally	1948	–	Social equity advocate	2019 A	
Geoff Gallop	1951	–	Academic, politician, Premier of Western Australia 2001–06	2008 Q	
Aaron Jonna Gandel	1935	–	Philanthropist	2017 Q	
Pauline Gandel	?	–	Philanthropist	2019 A	
Carrillo Gantner	1944	–	Theatre and festival director	2019 A	
Margaret Gardner	1954	–	University vice-chancellor (RMIT University, Monash University)	2020 A	
Prof Ross Garnaut	1946	–	Economist	2017 Q	
Sir Harry Gibbs	1917	2005	QC, Chief Justice of the High Court of Australia 1981–87	1987 Q	
Prof Richard Gibbs	1950s	–	Geneticist, researcher (genetics and human genome sequencing)	2014 Q	
Julia Gillard	1961	–	27th Prime Minister of Australia 2010-2013	2017 A	
Gerald Gleeson	1928	2017	Secretary of the NSW Premier's Department	1989 A	
Murray Gleeson	1938	–	Chief Justice of the Supreme Court of New South Wales 1988–98, Chief Justice of the High Court of Australia 1998–2008	1992 A	
Sir James Gobbo	1931	2021	QC, Justice of the Supreme Court of Victoria 1978–94, Governor of Victoria 1997–2000	1993 A	
David Gonski	1953	–	Business and commerce as a company director	2007 Q	
Charles Goode	1938	–	Chairman of ANZ Bank since 1995, company director, etc.	2001 Q	
Jacqueline Goodnow	1924	2014	In recognition of service to research into child development and education in the discipline of psychology	1992 Q	
Evonne Goolagong Cawley	1951	–	World No. 1 tennis player	2018 A	
Michelle Gordon	1964	–	Judge of the High Court of Australia	2019 A	
Sir John Gorton	1911	2002	19th Prime Minister of Australia 1968–71	1988 Q	
Dist Prof Jenny Graves	1941	–	Geneticist	2022 A	
Prof Adele Green	1952	–	For service to medical research through significant advances made in the field of the epidemiology of skin cancer and ovarian cancer, to public health including improved Indigenous health, and for leadership in the wider scientific community.	2004 Q	
Prof Anne Green			Physicist and astronomer	2022 Q	
Sir Guy Green	1937	2025	Chief Justice of the Supreme Court of Tasmania 1973–95, Governor of Tasmania 1995–2003, Administrator of the Commonwealth 2003	1994 A	
Nick Greiner	1947	–	Premier of New South Wales	1994 Q	
Reg Grundy	1923	2016	Media and television entrepreneur	2008 Q	
Dame Margaret Guilfoyle	1926	2020	Senator, first woman to be a member of Cabinet, Minister for Social Security 1975–80, Minister for Finance 1980–83	2005 Q	
William Gummow	1942	2026	Justice of the High Court of Australia 1995–2012	1997 A	
Sir William Gunn	1914	2003	Chairman of the Australian Wool Board	1990 A	
Mukesh Haikerwal	1960	–	Medical doctor and former Australian Medical Association federal president	2018 A	
James Haire	1946	–	For eminent service to the community through international leadership in ecumenical and interfaith dialogue, the promotion of religious reconciliation, inclusion and peace, and as a theologian.	2013 A	
Glenda Halliday	?	–	Neuroscientist, professor at the University of Sydney	2023 K	
Sir Rupert Hamer	1916	2004	Premier of Victoria 1972–81; for service to the arts, particularly as Chairman of the Victoria State Opera, and to the community	1992 A	
Catherine Hamlin	1924	2020	Obstetrician and gynaecologist; For service to gynaecology in developing countries particularly in the field of fistula surgery and for humanitarian service to improving the health, dignity and self-esteem of women in Ethiopia.	1995 A	
Peter Hannaford	1939	–	Scientist, academic, professor	2023 A	
Geoffrey Colin Harcourt	1931	2021	Academic economist and author, in the fields of Post-Keynesian economics, capital theory and economic thought.	2018 Q	
Ted Harris	1927	–	Community service	1989 Q	
Ralph Harry	1917	2002	High Commissioner to Singapore 1956–57; Director of ASIS 1958–60; Ambassador to the United Nations; Director of the Australian Institute of International Affairs	1980 Q	
Allan Hawke	1948	2022	Public administration at senior levels	2010 Q	
Bob Hawke	1929	2019	23rd Prime Minister of Australia 1983–91	1979 A	
John Hay	1942	2016	Vice-Chancellor of the University of Queensland 1996–2007	2004 A	
Bill Hayden	1933	2023	Politician, Foreign Minister 1983–88, Governor-General 1989–96	1989-02-16	
Kenneth Hayne	1945	–	Justice of the High Court of Australia 1997–2015	2002 Q	
Sir Bernard Heinze	1894	1982	Professor of Music at the University of Melbourne; Professor of Music, conductor and Director of the New South Wales State Conservatorium of Music	1976 A	
Peter Henderson	1928	2016	Secretary to the Department of Foreign Affairs	1985 A	
Dr Ken Henry	1957	–	Secretary to the Treasury	2007 A	
Sir William Heseltine	1930	–	Private Secretary to the Sovereign 1986–90	1988 A	
Dr Basil Hetzel	1922	2017	Medical researcher who has made a major contribution to combating iodine deficiency	1990 Q	
Sir Leo Hielscher	1926	2025	Senior Queensland public servant and administrator	2004 Q	
Prof Dorothy Hill	1907	1998	For service to geology particularly as a palaeontologist and to research and learning; first female professor at an Australian university	1993 A	
Robert Hill	1946	–	Minister for Defence (2001–06), Permanent Representative of Australia to the United Nations (2006–09)	2012 Q	
David Martin Hoare	1932	2022	Business executive	2019 A	
David Hogarth	?	–	For service to the legal profession and to the community	1983 Q	
Professor Ary Hoffmann	?	–	Geneticist and evolutionary biologist	2022 A	
Professor Peter Høj	1957	–	Biochemist	2019 A	
Sir John Holland	1914	2009	Construction magnate; For service to the community, particularly to youth and in the field of medical research	1988 Q	
Rev Peter Hollingworth	1935	2026	Anglican Archbishop of Brisbane; 23rd Governor-General	2011-06-29	
Prof Fred Hollows	1929	1993	Ophthalmologist	1991 Q	
Prof Andrew Holmes	1943	–	Scientist (Chemistry)	2017 A	
Catherine Holmes	1956	–	Chief Justice of Queensland	2020 A	
Janet Holmes à Court	1943	–	Businesswoman in the construction, wine and cattle industries	2007 A	
A. D. Hope	1907	2000	Poet	1981 A	
Robert Hope	1919	1999	For service to the law, to government, to learning and conservation	1989 A	
Prof Stephen Hopper	1951	–	Foundation Professor of Plant Conservation Biology at the University of Western Australia	2012 Q	
John Howard	1939	–	25th Prime Minister of Australia 1996–2007	2008 Q	
Barry Humphries	1934	2023	Actor and Comedian	2023 K	
Belinda Hutchinson	1953	–	Businessperson and philanthropist	2020 Q	
Prof David Hunter	?	–	Epidemiologist and Professor of Epidemiology and Medicine at Oxford Population Health	2023 K	
Sir Brian Inglis	1924	2014	Services to industry and technology KtB	1988 Q	
Hugh Jackman	1968	–	Actor and advocate for poverty eradication	2019 Q	
Sir Gordon Jackson	1924	1991	Businessman; 1983 promoted to Knight of the Order of Australia (AK)	1976 A	
Margaret Jackson	1953	–	Chairwoman of Qantas	2003 Q	
Robert Jackson	1911	1991	Under Secretary-General and Special Adviser to the United Nations Organisation	1986 Q	
Marjorie Jackson-Nelson	1931	–	Olympic athlete, Governor of South Australia 2001–07	2001-08-27	
Dist Prof Chennupati Jagadish	1957	–	Physicist and academic	2016 A	
MajGen William "Digger" James	1930	2015	National President of the RSL	1998 A	
MajGen Michael Jeffery	1937	2020	Military commander, Governor of Western Australia, Governor-General of Australia	1996 Q	
Peter (Richard Norman) Johnson	1923	2003	Inaugural Chancellor of the University of Technology, Sydney	2002 A	
Bob Johnston	1924	2023	Governor of the Reserve Bank of Australia	1986 Q	
Dr Barry Jones	1932	–	Minister for Science and Technology (1983–84), Minister for Science (1984–87), Minister for Science and Small Business (1987–88), Minister for Science, Customs and Small Business (1988–90)	2014 Q	
Prof Rhys Jones	1948	–	Mechanical and aerospace engineer	2018 A	
Deirdre Jordan	1926	2026	Academic and educator, particularly with Aboriginal communities	1989 A	
Dr Robert Joss	1941	–	Banking and finance executive	2016 A	
Alan Joyce	1966	–	Aviation executive	2017 Q	
Prof Peter Karmel	1922	2008	Economist, academic, First Vice-Chancellor of Flinders University 1966, Vice-Chancellor of the Australian National University 1982–87	1976 A	
Justice Patrick Keane	1952	–	Justice of the High Court of Australia 2013–present, Chief Justice of the Federal Court of Australia 2010–13, Queensland Solicitor-General 1992-2005	2015 Q	
Michael Keating	1940	–	Secretary to the Department of the Prime Minister and Cabinet	1996 A	
Bill Kelty	1948	–	For service to the trade union movement, particularly through the establishment of the universal system of superannuation	2008 Q	
David Kemp	1941	–	Politician	2017 A	
Jeff Kennett	1948	–	Premier of Victoria 1992–99	2005 A	
Sir John Kerr	1914	1991	Governor-General 1974–77; inaugural Principal Companion; inaugural Principal Knight.	1975-02-14	
Sir William Keys	1923	2000	Company director. National Secretary, 1961–1978, then National President, 1978–1988, Returned Services League of Australia	1988 Q	
Nicole Kidman	1967	–	Academy Award-winning actress (2003) and humanitarian	2006 A	
Susan Kiefel	1954	–	Chief Justice of the High Court of Australia	2011 Q	
Sir James Killen	1925	2007	Barrister, politician, Minister	2004 Q	
William John Kilpatrick	1906	1985	Community service	1981 A	
Dr Priscilla Kincaid-Smith	1926	2015	For service to medicine, particularly in the field of nephrology	1989 Q	
Len King	1925	2011	Politician, Cabinet Minister; lawyer, Chief Justice of the Supreme Court of South Australia 1978–95	1987 Q	
Malcolm Kinnaird	1933	2014	For service through the development of public policy in the defence procurement, infrastructure and energy sectors, and to business	2009 Q	
Michael Kirby	1939	–	Justice of the High Court of Australia 1996–2009	1991 A	
Sir Richard Kirby	1904	2001	President of the Australian Conciliation and Arbitration Commission. For distinguished service to the advertising industry in Australia and to the Herbert Vere Evatt Memorial Foundation.	1985 A	
James Kirk	?	–	Chairman of the Australian Bicentennial Authority	1988 Q	
Joan Kirner	1938	2015	Premier of Victoria (1990–92)	2012 Q	
Prof David William Kissane	1951	–	Psychiatrist specialising in psycho-oncology and palliative medicine	2018 A	
Sir Frank Kitto	1903	1994	Justice of the High Court of Australia 1950–70	1983 A	
Prof Peter Klinken	1953	–	Medical researcher	2017 Q	
Sir John Knott	1910	1999	Service to industry and the community	1981 Q	
Dame Leonie Kramer	1924	2016	For service to Australian literature, to education and to the community	1993 A	
Kurt Lambeck	1941	–	Geophysicist	2021 Q	
John Landels	1930	2020	Chairman of the National Grid Management Council	1996 Q	
John Landy	1930	2022	Olympic athlete; Governor of Victoria 2001–06.	2001-03-30	
Emeritus Professor Richard Larkins	1943	–	Chancellor of La Trobe University	2019 A	
John Laurie	1931	2022	Consulting engineer	2003 Q	
Rod Laver	1938	–	Tennis player	2016 A	
Phillip Law	1912	2010	Prominent in Antarctic exploration and research	1995 A	
Hieu Van Le	1954	–	Governor of South Australia 2014–2021	2016 Q	
Mark Leibler	1943	–	For service to business, to the law, particularly in the areas of taxation and commercial law, to the Jewish community internationally and in Australia, and to reconciliation and the promotion of understanding between Indigenous and non-Indigenous Australians	2005 A	
Jim Leslie	1922	2012	Managing director of Mobil Oil Australia, Chairman of Qantas 1980-89	1993 A	
John Levi	1934	–	First Australian to be ordained as a rabbi	2021 A	
Prof Melissa Little	1963	–	Medical researcher	2023 A	
Catherine Livingstone	1955	–	Businesswoman and chancellor of University of Technology Sydney	2024 A	
George (Peter) Lloyd	1920	2022	Aviator	2016 Q	
Prof Mal Logan	1931	2022	Geographer and university administrator	1996 A	
Prof Alan Lopez	1951	–	Academic, Scientist	2016 Q	
Brian Loton	1929	2022	Industrialist	1989 A	
Sir Frank Lowy	1930	–	Businessman and philanthropist	2000 A	
Geoffrey Lucas	1912	1992	Service to the law	1983 Q	
Prof Stephen Lynch	?	–	Surgeon (liver transplant specialist)	2015 Q	
Ian Macfarlane	1946	–	Governor of the Reserve Bank of Australia (RBA) 1996–2006	2004 A	
Jenny Macklin	1953	–	Politician	2023 K	
Sir Charles Mackerras	1925	2010	Classical conductor	1997 A	
Chief Justice John Macrossan	1930	2008	For service to the law, to higher education and the arts	1993 Q	
Justice Barry Maddern	1937	1994	President of the Australian Industrial Relations Commission	1992 Q	
David Malcolm	1938	2014	Chief Justice of the Supreme Court of Western Australia 1988–2005	1992 A	
Emeritus Professor Lew Mander	1939	2020	Organic chemist specialising in plant growth hormones	2018 A	
Prof Barry Marshall	1951	–	Received the 2005 Nobel Prize in Physiology or Medicine for his work with Helicobacter pylori	2007 A	
Prof Villis Marshall	?	–	Director of Urology at Royal Adelaide Hospital, Chancellor of St John Ambulance Australia	2006 A	
Prof Jennifer L. Martin	?	–	Scientist specialising in biochemistry and protein crystallography applied to drug-resistant bacteria	2018 A	
Chief Justice Wayne Martin	1952	–	Chief Justice of Western Australia (2006–2018)	2012 Q	
Sir Anthony Mason	1925	2026	Chief Justice of the High Court of Australia 1987–95	1988 A	
Keith Mason	1947	–	For service to the law and legal scholarship, to the judicial system in New South Wales, to the Anglican Church, and to the community	2003 A	
Sir Brian Massy-Greene	1916	1991	For service to banking, to industry and to the community	1989 A	
Justice Christopher Maxwell	1953	–	President of Court of Appeal of the Supreme Court of Victoria 2005–present	2015 Q	
James May	1934	2021	For service to the advancement of vascular surgery throughout the world, particularly through pioneering the introduction of endoluminal methods for the treatment of diseased arteries, placing Australia in the forefront internationally in this field	2001 Q	
Prof Lord (Robert) May	1936	2020	President of the Royal Society, London 2000–05	1998 A	
Lorraine Mazerolle	1964	–	Criminologist and researcher	2024 A	
David McAllister	1963	–	Ballet dancer	2021 Q	
Prof Janet Susan McCalman	1948	–	Social historian and academic	2018 A	
Rev Dr Davis McCaughey	1914	2005	Governor of Victoria 1986–92	1987 Q	
Doug McClelland	1926	–	Minister, President of the Senate, High Commissioner to the United Kingdom	1987 Q	
Malcolm McCusker	1938	–	Governor of Western Australia	2012 A	
Donald McDonald	1938	–	Chairman of the Australian Broadcasting Corporation	2006 Q	
Prof Trevor McDougall	1952	–	Scientist specialising in ocean thermodynamics	2018 A	
Richard McGarvie	1926	2003	Governor of Victoria 1992–97	1994 Q	
Mark McGowan	1967	–	Politician, 30th Premier of Western Australia	2024 K	
Sir Charles McGrath	1910	1984	For service to industry	1981 A	
Michael McHugh	1935	–	Justice of the High Court of Australia 1989–2005	1989 Q	
Sir Malcolm McIntosh	1945	2000	For service to excellence in scientific and technological research	1999 A	
Sir Laurence McIntyre	1912	1981	For public service	1979 A	
James McKay	?	–	For service to the spiritual and physical wellbeing of the people of outback Australia	1998 A	
Bruce McKellar	1941	–	For eminent service to science, particularly the study of theoretical physics, as an academic, educator and researcher, through seminal contributions to scientific development organisations, and as an author and mentor.	2014 A	
Justice Carmel McLure	1955	–	President of the Court of Appeal of the Supreme Court of Western Australia 2009–16	2016 Q	
Julian McMahon	?	–	Anti-death penalty barrister	2017 Q	
Justice Margaret McMurdo	1954	–	For service to the law and judicial administration in Queensland, particularly in the areas of legal education and women's issues, to the support of a range of legal organisations, and to the community.	2007 Q	
Sir James McNeill	1916	1987	For service to industry	1986 Q	
Leycester Meares	1909	1994	Public servant	1985 A	
Prof Harry Messel	1922	2015	Physicist and conservation advocate	2006 A	
Prof Em Donald Metcalf	1929	2014	Cancer researcher, professor emeritus of the University of Melbourne	1993 Q	
Dr Ken Michael	1938	–	Governor of Western Australia 2006–11	2006 A	
Howard Michell	1913	2012	For service to the wool industry and to the arts	1990 Q	
Naomi Milgrom	1952	–	Businessperson	2020 Q	
Jacques Miller	1931	–	Immunologist	2003 Q	
Nancy Millis	1922	2012	Microbiologist	1990 Q	
Bernard Mills	1920	2011	Engineer, Professor of Physics (Sydney), pioneer radio astronomer (Mills Cross Telescope)	1976 Q	
Jonathan Mills	1963	–	Composer and festival director	2024 K	
Harold Mitchell	1942	2024	Businessman and Philanthropist	2010 Q	
Dame Roma Mitchell	1913	2000	First female appointed Queen's Counsel, first female appointed Judge, Justice of the Supreme Court of South Australia 1968–91, Governor of South Australia 1991–96	1991 A	
Dr Graeme Moad	1952	–	Polymer chemist	2022 A	
Prof Tanya Monro	1973	–	Physicist and Chief Defence Scientist	2022 Q	
Sir John Moore	1915	1998	President of the Australian Conciliation and Arbitration Commission	1986 A	
Max Moore-Wilton	1943	–	Secretary of the Department of the Prime Minister and Cabinet	2001 A	
Terry Moran	1947	–	Secretary of the Department of the Prime Minister and Cabinet	2012 A	
Hugh Morgan	1940	–	Mining industry executive	2002 Q	
Prof Sir Peter Morris	1934	2022	Nuffield Professor of Surgery Emeritus at the University of Oxford	2004 Q	
Sam Mostyn	1965	-	Businesswoman and 28th Governor General	2024 K	
Rev Dr Gordon Moyes	1938	2015	Founder of the Wesley Mission	2002 A	
Justice James Muirhead	1925	1999	Royal Commissioner into Aboriginal Deaths in Custody	1991 A	
Dame Elisabeth Murdoch	1909	2012	Philanthropist	1989 Q	
Rupert Murdoch	1931	–	For service to the media, particularly the newspaper publishing industry	1984 A	
Prof Brendan Murphy	1955	–	Nephrologist and Chief Medical Officer	2022 Q	
Ken Myer	1921	1992	Philanthropist	1976 A	
Sidney Baillieu Myer	1926	2022	For service to business and commerce, to government and to the community	1990 A	
Allen Myers	1947	–	Barrister, academic, businessman, landowner and philanthropist	2016 A	
Maria Myers	?	–	Philanthropist	2016 A	
Jacques Nasser	1947	–	Chairman BHP; for service to business and commerce; philanthropist	2017 Q	
Sir Eric Neal	1924	2025	CEO of Boral, Director of John Fairfax Holdings, BHP, Coca-Cola Amatil and AMP, Chairperson of Westpac, Governor of South Australia 1996–2001	1988 A	
Bill Neilson	1925	1989	Premier of Tasmania	1978 Q	
Geoffrey Nettle	1950	–	Judge of the High Court of Australia	2019 A	
Bernhard Neumann	1909	2002	Mathematician	1994 Q	
Maurice Newman	1938	–	Chair of the Australian Broadcasting Corporation, chair of the board of the Australian Securities Exchange, Chancellor of Macquarie University	2002 A	
Olivia Newton-John	1948	2022	Supporter of cancer research; singer/songwriter	2019 A	
John Niland	1940	–	Businessman and academic	2001 A	
Dr Helen Nugent	1949	–	Company director	2022 A	
Sir Sidney Nolan	1917	1992	Artist	1988 Q	
Professor Kathryn North	?	–	Paediatric physician, neurologist, and clinical geneticist	2019 A	
Prof Sir Gustav Nossal	1931	–	Research biologist, Chairman of the CSIRO	1989 Q	
Bernard O'Brien	1924	1993	Microsurgeon; bio	1991 Q	
Rev Gerald O'Collins	1931	2024	Catholic theologian and academic	2006 A	
Prof Ian O'Connor	1957	–	Academic, Vice Chancellor and President of Griffith University	2017 Q	
Lowitja O'Donoghue	1932	2024	Chairperson of the Aboriginal and Torres Strait Islander Commission (ATSIC)	1999 A	
Dame Bridget Ogilvie	1938	–	Biomedical research, particularly related to veterinary and medical parasitology	2007 A	
Emeritus Prof Mary O'Kane	1954	–	Scientist, Chief Scientist and Engineer of Government of New South Wales 2008–18	2016 A	
Sir Mark Oliphant	1901	2000	Physicist, Professor, Governor of South Australia 1972–77	1977 A	
Margaret Olley	1923	2011	Artist	2006 Q	
James O'Sullivan	?	–	For service to law enforcement and commitment to excellence in reshaping and introducing wide-ranging reforms in the Queensland Police Service	2001 Q	
Emeritus Prof Robert Ouvrier	1940	–	Physician (paediatric neurology), President of International Child Neurology Association 2006-2010	2016 A	
Kerry Packer	1937	2005	Businessman	1983 A	
Roslyn Packer	1937	–	Philanthropist	2016 Q	
Sir Arvi Parbo	1926	2019	Businessman	1993 Q	
Justice Kevin Parker	1937	2023	Vice-president of the International Criminal Tribunal for the former Yugoslavia	2008 Q	
Dr Martin Parkinson	1958	–	Public Servant; Economist	2017 A	
Percy Partridge	1910	1988	For service to education & educational research, particularly in the field of social sciences	1978 A	
John Pascoe	1948	–	Judge, businessman, company director, Chief Judge of the Federal Circuit Court of Australia 2004–17, Chief Justice of the Family Court of Australia 2017–present	2016 A	
Nicholas Paspaley	1948	–	For service to business development and trade, to the Australian pearling industry, and to the community	1999 A	
John Passmore	1914	2004	Philosopher	1992 Q	
Andrew Peacock	1939	2021	Australian politician, Foreign Minister 1975–80, Leader of the Opposition 1983–85 & 1989–90	1997 Q	
Jim Peacock	1937	2025	Molecular biologist	1994 A	
Cardinal George Pell	1941	2023	Catholic Archbishop of Sydney (2001–2014), Cardinal (2003– ), etc.	2005 Q	
Gary Pemberton	1940	–	For service to business and finance, to public sector reform, and to the community, particularly medical research organisations concerned with children's health	1999 Q	
Prof David Penington	1930	2023	For service to medicine and to the community, particularly in the field of medical education and health care	1988 A	
Stan Perron	1922	2018	Businessman and philanthropist	2019 A	
Prof Philip Pettit	1945	–	Academic, philosopher, political theorist	2017 Q	
John Phillips	1933	2009	Chief Justice of the Supreme Court of Victoria	1998 A	
Sir James Plimsoll	1917	1987	Public servant and diplomat	1978 A	
George Polites	1918	2019	For service to industrial relations	1984 A	
Prof Robert Porter	1932	–	Neuroscientist	2001 A	
Lady (Primrose) Potter	1931	–	Philanthropist	2003 Q	
Lawrie Powell	1934	2022	Gastroenterology and hepatologist	1990 Q	
Cheryl Praeger	1948	–	Mathematician	2021 A	
Jeanne Pratt	?	–	Philanthropist	2002 Q	
John B. Prescott	1940	–	Managing director of BHP	1996 Q	
Leo Radom	1944	–	Computational chemist		
John Ralph	1932	–	For service to Australian industry as an advocate of "continual improvement" in international competitiveness and in the strategic assessment of long term public policy, particularly in the area of tax reform, and for contributions in the interest of the wider community including social development, education, leadership initiatives for the young and charitable organisations.	2000 Q	
Mike Rann	1953	–	Third-longest serving Premier of South Australia 2002–2011, longest serving Labor leader 1994–2011, Member of Parliament 1985–2011; Australian High Commissioner to the United Kingdom 2013–2014, Australia's Ambassador to Italy, Albania, Libya and San Marino and Australia's Permanent Representative to the United Nations' Food and Agriculture Organization and World Food Programme 2014–present.	2016 A	
Eric Reece	1909	1999	Premier of Tasmania	1975 Q	
Lloyd Rees	1895	1998	Landscape painter	1985 A	
Thomas Reeve	1923	2023	For service to medicine and to academic and clinical surgery, particularly in the field of endocrinology	1994 A	
MajGen Sir William Refshauge	1913	2009	Director-General Army Medical Services in Korea, Honorary Physician to Queen Elizabeth II 1955–64, Director-General of the Commonwealth Department of Health 1960–73, Secretary-General of the World Medical Association 1973–76, etc.	1980 Q	
Prof Gordon Reid	1923	1989	Academic, Professor of politics, Vice-Chancellor University of Western Australia 1978–82, Governor of Western Australia 1983–89	1986 Q	
Prof Janice Reid	1947	–	Academic (medical anthropology), Vice-Chancellor University of Western Sydney 1998-2013	2015 A	
Jack Renshaw	1909	1987	Deputy Premier 1959–64 and Premier of New South Wales 1964–65	1979 A	
Margaret Reynolds	1941	–	Politician, Senator 1983–99, Minister 1987–90	2023 A	
Dennis Richardson	1947	–	Diplomat and public servant	2019 Q	
Prof Ezio Rizzardo	1943	–	Scientific technological researcher specialising in polymer chemistry	2018 A	
Archie Roach	1956	2022	Songwriter, singer, Aboriginal activist	2023 A	
Sir Rutherford Robertson	1913	2001	For service to biological sciences	1980 A	
Bruce Gregory Robinson	1956	–	Endocrinologist	2020 A	
Prof Jeffrey Victor Rosenfeld	1952	–	Neurosurgeon	2018 A	
Jennifer Rowe	1948	–	Author	2019 A	
AirMshl Sir James Rowland	1922	1999	Chief of the Air Staff 1975–79, Governor of New South Wales 1981–89	1987 A	
Eric Rudd	1910	1999	For service to the mineral and petroleum industries	1984 A	
Kevin Rudd	1957	–	26th Prime Minister of Australia	2019 Q	
Geoffrey Rush	1951	–	Actor	2014 A	
Graeme Ryan	1938	–	For service to science and to higher education, particularly in the fields of medical research and medical education	1994 A	
Carlo Salteri	1920	2010	Co-founder of Transfield, founder of Tenix	2002 A	
Graeme Samuel	1946	–	Businessman and Chairman of the Australian Competition and Consumer Commission	2010 Q	
Gordon Samuels	1923	2007	QC, Judge of the Supreme Court of New South Wales, Chancellor of the University of New South Wales 1976–94, Governor of New South Wales 1996–2001	1987 Q	
Kerry Sanderson	1950	–	Governor of Western Australia 2014–18	2016 Q	
Rear Adm Kevin Scarce	1952	–	Commander Training Command – Navy, Head of Maritime Systems, Governor of South Australia 2007–2014	2008 A	
Brian Schmidt	1967	–	Astrophysicist, Nobel Prize Laureate (Physics, 2011), etc.	2013 A	
Dame Margaret Scott	1922	2019	Founding Director of The Australian Ballet School	2005 Q	
Sir Walter Scott	1903	1981	Founded Australia's first management consultancy firm, WD Scott	1979 A	
Harry Seidler	1923	2006	Architect	1987 Q	
Patricia Margaret Selkirk	1942	–	Plant biologist and ecologist	2022 Q	
Sir Nicholas Shehadie	1926	2018	National representative Rugby Union 1947–58, Lord Mayor of Sydney 1973–75	1990 Q	
Dr Peter Shergold	1946	–	Academic, public servant, Secretary of the Department of the Prime Minister and Cabinet 2003–08	2007 A	
Prof John Shine	1946	–	Biochemist, molecular biologist	2017 Q	
Alfred Moxon Simpson	1910	2011	For eminent and meritorious service to business and industry	1978 Q	
Prof Stephen Simpson	1957	–	Academic researcher (biological and biomedical science), Academic Director of Charles Perkins Centre of the University of Sydney 2012–present	2015 Q	
Ian Sinclair	1929	–	Australian politician, National Party of Australia Leader 1984–89, Speaker of the House of Representatives 1998-98	2001 A	
Rear Adm Peter Sinclair	1934	–	Deputy Chief of Navy, Governor of New South Wales 1990–96	1992 Q	
Prof Peter Singer	1946	–	Ira W. DeCamp Professor of Bioethics at Princeton University and Laureate Professor at the Centre for Applied Philosophy and Public Ethics at the University of Melbourne	2012 Q	
Ralph Slatyer	1929	2012	For service to science and technology and its application to industry development.	1993 Q	
Prof Em J. J. C. Smart	1920	2012	For service to education particularly in the field of philosophy	1990 Q	
Maree Smith	?	–	Neuropathic pain researcher	2019 Q	
Neil Andrew Smith	?	–	For service to the community, particularly through administration of the Victorian Bush Fire Appeal (1983) Trust Fund	1984 Q	
Richard (Dick) Smith	1944	–	Entrepreneur, businessman, aviator, political activist, philanthropist	2015 Q	
Thomas Weetman Smith	1901	2000	For service to the law and to legal institutions	1990 A	
Victor Smorgon	1913	2009	Industrialist, philanthropist	2007 Q	
Erica Lee Smyth	1952	–	Geologist and senior mining executive	2018 Q	
Prof David Solomon	1929	–	Academic (polymer chemistry and plastics)	2016 Q	
Lady (Marigold) Southey	1928	–	Lieutenant-Governor of Victoria	2006 A	
Virginia Margaret Spate	1937	2022	Art historian, author and academic	2018 Q	
Dr Michael Spence	1962	–	Academic; Vice-Chancellor of University of Sydney 2008-2020	2017 A	
James Spigelman	1946	–	For service to the law and to the community through leadership in bringing about change in attitudes to the administration of justice for a more fair and equitable society, and to the support of the visual arts.	2000 Q	
Prof Fiona Stanley	1946	–	For service to maternal and child health research, particularly in peri-natal and infant problems, and for her contributions to improving aboriginal and community health	1996 Q	
Keith Steel	1917	1996	For service to industry, General Manager of the Australian Mutual Provident Society (AMP Limited) 1966–79	1981 Q	
Glenn Stevens	1958	–	Economist, Governor of the Reserve Bank of Australia 2006–16	2016 Q	
Kerry Stokes	1940	–	For service to business and commerce through strategic leadership and promotion of corporate social responsibility, to the arts through executive roles and philanthropy, and to the community, particularly through contributions to organisations supporting youth	2008 Q	
Shane Stone	1950	–	KC, Chief Minister of the Northern Territory 1995–99	2006 Q	
Sir Laurence Street	1926	2018	Chief Justice of the Supreme Court of New South Wales	1989 Q	
Prof Hugh Stretton	1924	2015	Historian, academic economist	2004 Q	
Russell Strong	1938	–	For service to medicine as a pioneer in the development of new techniques and improved clinical performance in the field of liver transplant surgery and to advancing world knowledge in this area	2001 A	
Grant Sutherland	1945	–	For service to science in the field of human genetics research and to the human genome project and, in particular, for his contribution to the discovery of the importance of 'fragile chromosomes' in the field of inherited diseases	1998 A	
Dame Joan Sutherland	1926	2010	Opera singer	1975 Q	
Prof Nicholas Talley	1956	–	Gastroenterologist	2018 A	
Sir Arthur Tange	1914	2001	For eminent and meritorious public service.	1977 Q	
Noel Tanzer	1931	–	For service to public sector reform, particularly through the commercialisation of government enterprises, to the development of social welfare policies and to the community	1994 A	
Hugh Taylor	1947	–	For service to medicine in the field of ophthalmology, particularly through renowned work in the prevention of river blindness in the third world, to academia through research and education related to the prevention of eye disease, and to the development of policy on eye health in indigenous communities.	2001 Q	
Prof Maree Rose Teesson	?	–	Medical specialist in prevention and treatment of substance abuse disorders	2018 A	
Deborah Terry	?	–	Psychology scholar and academic administrator	2024 A	
San Hoa Thang	1954	–	Professor of chemistry, specialising in polymer chemistry and materials science	2018 Q	
Colin Thiele	1920	2006	Author	1977 Q	
Anthony William Thomas	1949	–	Nuclear physicist	2020 A	
Sally Thomas	1939	–	Justice of the Supreme Court of the Northern Territory (1992–2009), Administrator of the Northern Territory (2011–), Chancellor of Charles Darwin University (2010–)	2014 A	
Roy Francis Thompson	?	–	Philanthropist supporting medical research, emergency rescue, educational, sporting and cultural organisations, and real estate and land developer in Queensland.	2018 A	
John Tonkin	1902	1995	Premier of Western Australia	1977 Q	
John Toohey	1930	2015	Justice of the High Court of Australia 1987–98	1988 A	
Arthur Trendall	1909	1995	Art historian and classical archaeologist	1976 A	
Sir Donald Trescowthick	1930	2024	For service to the community, to the arts and to sport	1991 A	
Ken Tribe	1914	2010	For service to the arts, particularly in the field of music	1989 Q	
Emeritus Professor Patrick Troy	1936	2018	Urban and regional planner and academic	2019 A	
Warren Truss	1948	–	Former Federal National Party leader	2019 A	
Barry Tuckwell	1931	2020	Classical French horn player	1992 A	
Malcolm Turnbull	1954	–	Lawyer, banker and politician. Prime Minister (2015–2018)	2021 A	
John Uhrig	1928	2024	Chairman Santos	2000 Q	
Peter Underwood	1937	2014	Governor of Tasmania	2009 Q	
Tom Uren	1921	2015	Boxer, soldier, politician	2013 A	
John Walter Utz	1928	2011	For service to business and to industry	1989 A	
Sir James Vernon	1910	2000	Industrial Chemist, Director of CSR (Colonial Sugar Refining Company) 1958–82	1980 A	
Dr Michael Vertigan	1941	–	For service as a community leader in public administration, through development of far reaching fiscal policy reform; in business and industry, through focusing on strategic investment for sustainable economic growth; and in education through university governance	2004 A	
Sir William Vines	1916	2011	Managing director, International Wool Secretariat; chairman, Wool Review Committee; nla1nla2obit; KtB	1987 Q	
Nanette Stacy Waddy	1915	2015	For service to medical education and to the community particularly in the field of drug and alcohol abuse	1988 Q	
Nancy Wake	1912	2011	War hero: "The award recognises the significant contribution and commitment of Nancy Wake, stemming from her outstanding actions in wartime, in encouraging community appreciation and understanding of the past sacrifices made by Australian men and women in times of conflict, and to a lasting legacy of peace"	2004-02-22	
Ron Walker	1939	2018	For service to business, the arts and the community, and to raising the profile of Australia internationally with significant benefit for tourism and employment.	2003 A	
Stanley Wallis	?	–	For service to business and manufacturing through strategic development of globally competitive enterprises, to enhancing the reputation of Australia internationally through reform of financial institutions and the taxation system, and to the community through support for medical research.	2002 Q	
Robert Walsh	1917	1983	For services to medicine	1982 Q	
Kate Warner	1948	–	28th Governor of Tasmania	2017 A	
Justice Marilyn Warren	1951	–	For service to the judiciary and to the legal profession particularly the delivery and administration of law in Victoria, to the community in areas affecting the social and economic conditions of women and to forensic medicine internationally.	2005 Q	
Dr Robin Warren	1937	2024	Discovered Helicobacter pylori in 1979. Awarded 2005 Nobel Prize in Physiology or Medicine	2007 A	
Sir Bruce Watson	1928	2008	For leadership in a range of fields of endeavour covering industry and commerce, the arts, and education and for developing medical research facilities of international standard in Australia	2004 A	
Dr Ian Watt	1950	–	Public servant, Secretary of the Department of the Prime Minister and Cabinet 2011-14	2016 Q	
Penelope Wensley	1946	–	Australian diplomat, Governor of Queensland	2011 A	
Sir Frederick Wheeler	1914	1994	Secretary to the Treasury	1979 A	
Gough Whitlam	1916	2014	21st Prime Minister of Australia 1972–75	1978 Q	
Ray Whitrod	1915	2003	For service to Australian law enforcement (Queensland Police Commissioner), to victims of crime and to the community	1993 A	
Judith Whitworth	1944	–	For service to the advancement of academic medicine and as a major contributor to research policy and medical research administration in Australia and internationally	2001 Q	
Dr Paul Wild	1923	2008	Chairman of the CSIRO	1986 A	
Peter Wilenski	1939	1994	For service to international relations and to public sector reform, particularly through fostering the implementation of social justice and equity principles	1994 Q	
Helen Williams	1945	–	Senior public servant	2019 A	
Prof Keryn Williams	1949	–	Medical scientist (Ophthalmology)	2017 A	
Peter Wills	?	–	For service to social and economic advancement through the development of public policy in relation to funding for biomedical research and evolving biotechnology industries	2001 Q	
Sir Ronald Wilson	1922	2005	Justice of the High Court of Australia 1979–89	1988 A	
Sir Henry Winneke	1908	1985	Chief Justice of the Supreme Court of Victoria, Governor of Victoria	1982 A	
Justice John Winneke	1938	2019	President of the Victorian Court of Appeal	2004 Q	
Professor Carl Wood	1929	2011	Service to the discipline of obstetrics and gynaecology particularly through the development of in-vitro fertilisation (IVF) and its application to human infertility	1995 A	
Alan Woods	1930	1990	Senior public servant; Secretary to the Departments of Defence, Resources and Energy, etc.	1989 A	
Justice Sir Edward Woodward	1928	2010	For contributions to Australian public life, particularly in the areas of public administration, social justice, cultural diversity, education and advocacy for people with mental illness	2001 Q	
Roger Woodward	1942	–	Classical pianist	1992 Q	
Richard Woolcott	1927	2023	For service to international relations and to Asia Pacific economic co-operation.	1993 Q	
Hal Wootten	1922	2021	For service to human rights, to conservation, to legal education and to the law	1990 Q	
Neville Wran	1926	2014	Premier of New South Wales 1976–86	1988 A	
John Wylie	1961	–	Chairperson of the Australian Sports Commission	2022 A	
Sir Geoffrey Yeend	1927	1994	Secretary to the Department of the Prime Minister and Cabinet and Secretary to Cabinet		
Jeannette Young	1963	–	Governor of Queensland; Chief Health Officer	2022 Q	
Sir John Young	1919	2008	Chief Justice of the Supreme Court of Victoria 1974–91	1989 A	
Dr John Yu	1934	–	For service to the provision and development of "state of the art" paediatric care and research, to children's rights, to education, and to the decorative and visual arts	2001 Q	
Mr. Yunupingu	1956	2013	Musician, songwriter, teacher, advocate, etc.	2014 A	
Carla Zampatti	1938	2021	Fashion designer and businesswoman	2009 Q	
Sir David Zeidler	1918	1998	Chemist and industrialist	1990 Q	

=== Military Division ===
Name	Born	Died	Notability	Awarded	Notes
GEN John Baker	1936	2007	Vice-Chief of the Defence Force 1992–95, Chief of Defence Force 1995–98	1995 A	
ADML Chris Barrie	1945	–	Vice-Chief of the Defence Force 1997–98, Chief of Defence Force 1998–2002	2001 A	
ADML Alan Beaumont	1934	2004	Vice-Chief of the Defence Force 1989–1992, Chief of Defence Force 1993–95	1992 A	
GEN Sir Phillip Bennett	1928	2023	Governor of Tasmania 1987–95; Chief of the Defence Force 1984–87	1985 Q	
AIRMSHL Mark Binskin	1960		Chief of Air Force (2008–2011), Vice Chief of the Defence Force (2011–2014), Chief of the Defence Force (2014– )	2014 A	
LTGEN John Coates	1932	2018	Chief of the General Staff 1990–92	1992 A	
LTGEN Peter Cosgrove	1947	–	Chief of the Australian Army 2000–02. Subsequently, General Cosgrove, Chief of the Defence Force 2002–05; 2014 promoted to Knight of the Order (AK) on appointment as Governor-General	2000-03-25	
AIRMSHL David Evans	1925	2020	Chief of Air Staff 1982–85	1984 Q	
AIRMSHL Ray Funnell	1935	–	Vice-Chief of the Defence Force 1986–87, Chief of the Air Staff 1987–92	1989 Q	
LTGEN Ken Gillespie	1952	–	Vice Chief of the Defence Force/Chief of Joint Operations and Chief of Army	2011 A	
GEN Peter Gration	1932	–	Chief of Army 1984–87, Chief of the Defence Force 1987–93	1988 A	
LTGEN John Grey	1939	–	Chief of the General Staff 1992–95	1995 Q	
GEN Sir Francis Hassett	1918	2008	Chief of General Staff 1973–75, Chief of the Defence Force Staff 1975–77	1975 Q	
ACM Angus Houston	1947	–	Chief of the Defence Force 2005–2011; 2015 promoted to Knight of the Order of Australia (AK)	2008 A	
ADML David Johnston	1962	–	Chief of the Defence Force 2024–present	2022 Q	
ADML Mike Hudson	1933	2005	Chief of the Naval Staff 1985–91	1987 Q	
LTGEN David Hurley	1953	–	Chief Capability Development Group 2003–07, Chief of Joint Operations 2007–08, Vice-Chief of the Defence Force, 2008–11. Subsequently, General Hurley, Chief of the Defence Force 2011–14, Governor of New South Wales (2014–2019), Governor-General of Australia (2019–present)	2010 A	
VADM Ian Knox	1933	2024	Vice-Chief of the Defence Force 1987–89	1989 Q	
VADM David Leach	1928	2020	Chief of the Naval Staff 1982–85	1984 Q	
LTGEN Peter Leahy	1952	–	Chief of Army 2002–08	2007 Q	
VADM Ian MacDougall	1938	2020	Maritime Commander Australia 1989–90, Chief of the Naval Staff 1991–94, Commissioner NSW Fire Brigades 1994–2003, Chair CRC Bushfires 2003–07, etc.	1993 Q	
AIRMSHL John Newham	1930	2022	Chief of the Air Staff 1985–87	1986 Q	
LTGEN Lawrence O'Donnell	1933	2026	Chief of the General Staff 1987–90	1989 Q	
HRH Prince Philip	1921	2021	Consort of HM The Queen; 2015 promoted to Knight of the Order of Australia (AK)	1988 Q	
LTGEN John Sanderson	1940		Commander United Nations Transitional Authority in Cambodia, Chief of the General Staff 1995–97, Chief of Army 1997–1998, Governor of Western Australia 2000–05.	1994 A	
ADML Sir Victor Smith	1913	1998	Chief of Naval Staff 1968–70, Chairman, Chiefs of Staff Committee 1970–75	1975 Q	
VADM Sir David Stevenson	1918	1998	Chief of Naval Staff 1973–76	1976 A	

== Honorary companions ==
Country	Name	Born	Died	Notability	Awarded	Notes
(Japan)	Shinzo Abe	1954	2022	Prime Minister of Japan 2006–07 and 2012–20	31 August 2022	
(Samoa)	Tofilau Eti Alesana	1924	1999	Foreign Minister of Samoa 1984–85 and 1988–98	6 July 1994	
(United States)	Richard Armitage	1945	–	United States Deputy Secretary of State	1 July 2010	
(Myanmar)	Aung San Suu Kyi	1945	–	In recognition of her outstanding leadership and great personal courage in the struggle to bring democracy to Burma	24 May 1996	
(Chile)	Michelle Bachelet	1951	–	President of Chile 2006–2010, 2014–; executive director of UN Women	5 Oct 2012	
(France)	Francis Blanchard	1916	2009	Second longest-serving Director-General of the International Labour Organization	26 Jan 1990	
(India)	Agnesë Gonxhe Bojaxhiu	1910	1997	(Best known as "Mother Teresa of Calcutta"). Roman Catholic nun, Humanitarian	26 Jan 1982	
(France)	Jacques Cousteau	1910	1997	In recognition of service to the environment, conservation and marine exploration	26 Jan 1990	
(Japan)	Koichiro Ejiri	1920	2015	Chairman of Mitsui and Company Ltd; Chairman of Mitsubishi; etc.	6 Feb 1992	
(United States)	Charles Feeney	1931	2023	For eminent service and contributions to philanthropy, particularly to Australia's health, research and higher education sectors.	10 Aug 2022	
(United Kingdom)	Sir Peter Gadsden	1929	2006	For service to Australian/British relations, particularly as Chairman of the Britain-Australia Bicentennial Committee	26 Jan 1988	
(United Kingdom) (United States)	Sir Barry Gibb	1946	–	Musician, singer-songwriter and record producer; member of the Bee Gees	27 Jan 2022	
(Singapore)	Goh Chok Tong	1941	–	Prime Minister of Singapore 1990–2004	1 Feb 2005	
(United States)	John Gorman	1931	–	Physician and medical researcher	19 July 2024	
(Switzerland)	Alexandre Hay	1919	1991	President of the International Committee of the Red Cross (ICRC).	26 Jan 1990	
(Japan)	Takashi Imai	1929	–	Chairman of Nippon Steel (1998–2003); Director: Nippon Life Insurance, Nippon T & T, Japan Securities Finance Co; etc.	8 July 2003	
(United States)	Jill Ker Conway	1934	2018	Author and academic	12 Jun 2013	
(New Zealand)	Sir John Key	1961	–	For eminent service to Australia-New Zealand relations	18 July 2017	
(Japan)	Yorihiko Kojima	1941	–	For eminent service to advancing Australia-Japan bilateral trade and economic relations	9 April 2015	
(Singapore)	Lee Hsien Loong	1952	–	Senior Minister of Singapore (2024–present), Prime Minister of Singapore (2014–2024)	6 August 2025	
(South Korea)	Lee Ku-Taek	1946	–	Chairman and CEO of POSCO; Chairman of World Steel Association; etc.	16 March 2006	
(South Africa)	Nelson Mandela	1918	2013	President of South Africa	14 Jun 1999	
(United States)	James Mattis	1950	–	United States Secretary of Defense	9 Aug 2021	
(India)	Zubin Mehta	1936	–	Indian conductor of classical music	17 Aug 2022	
(Japan)	Akio Mimura	1940	–	Representative Director & President of Nippon Steel	28 Sep 2012	
(Greece)	Constantine Mitsotakis	1918	2017	Prime Minister of Greece	6 Feb 1992	
(Japan)	Minoru Murofushi	1931	2016	Chairman, ITOCHU Corporation; chairman, Tokyo Chamber of Commerce and Industry; etc.	8 July 2003	
(Japan)	Shigeo Nagano	1900	1984	Chairman of Nippon Steel; President of the Japan Chamber of Commerce and Industry; etc.	26 Jan 1980	
(Japan)	Saburo Okita	1914	1993	For service to international relations between Australia and Japan	17 May 1985	
(Turkey)	Turgut Özal	1927	1993	Prime Minister of Turkey	8 Feb 1991	
(New Zealand)	Sir Geoffrey Palmer	1942	–	Prime Minister of New Zealand 1989–90	8 Feb 1991	
(South Korea)	Tae-Joon Park	1927	2011	For eminent service to Australian/Korean relations, particularly trade.	8 Feb 1991	
(Malaysia)	Tunku Abdul Rahman	1903	1990	First Prime Minister of Malaysia	26 Jan 1987	
(Timor-Leste)	José Ramos-Horta	1949	–	President of Timor-Leste 2007–2012, etc.	25 Nov 2013	
(Guyana)	Sir Shridath Ramphal	1928	2024	Secretary-General of the Commonwealth of Nations 1975–90	26 Jan 1982	
(France)	Michel Rocard	1930	2016	Prime Minister of France	6 Feb 1992	
(Netherlands)	Mark Rutte	1967	–	Prime Minister of the Netherlands	9 Oct 2019	
(Japan)	Eishiro Saitō	1911	2002	For service to Australia-Japan business relations	26 Jan 1988	
(Japan)	Hiroshi Saitō	1939	–	For service to Australia-Japan business relations	14 Oct 1997	
(United Kingdom)	Lord (Edward) Shackleton	1911	1994	For service to Australian/British relations, particularly through the Britain/Australia Society	26 Jan 1990	
(New Zealand)	Sir Brian Talboys	1921	2012	Deputy Prime Minister of New Zealand 1975–81	26 Jan 1982	
(New Zealand)	Prof Stuart Ross Taylor	1925	2021	For outstanding service to science, particularly in the fields of geochemistry and cosmochemistry	4 Sep 2008	
(New Zealand)	Dame Kiri Te Kanawa	1944	–	New Zealand opera singer	26 Jan 1990	
(Japan)	Eiji Toyoda	1913	2013	For service to Australian/Japanese relations, particularly the Australian automotive industry	21 Sep 1993	
(Japan)	Shoichiro Toyoda	1925	2023	For service to Australian manufacturing, particularly for his contribution to the industrial development of the Australian automotive industry	14 Jun 1999	
(Denmark)	Jørn Utzon	1918	2008	Architect of the Sydney Opera House	17 May 1985	
(Indonesia)	Susilo Bambang Yudhoyono	1949	–	President of Indonesia	9 March 2010	
(Switzerland)	Prof Rolf Zinkernagel	1944	–	Co-recipient with Professor Peter C. Doherty of the 1996 Nobel Prize in Physiology or Medicine	14 Jun 1999	

== Former companions ==
Name	Born	Died	Notability	Awarded	Notes
Brian Burke	1947	–	Premier of Western Australia 1983–88	1988 Q	Honour cancelled in 1995
H. C. "Nugget" Coombs	1906	1997	Australian economist, senior public servant, 1st Governor of the Reserve Bank, etc.	1975 Q	Resigned in 1976 when AK created.
Richard Pratt	1934	2009	Businessman	1998 Q	Resigned from the Order: refer Gazette No. S 40, 22 Feb 2008.
Patrick White	1912	1990	Author	1975 Q	Resigned in 1976 in protest at the sacking of the Whitlam government in 1975.
Dyson Heydon	1943	–	Judge of the High Court of Australia	2004 Q	Resigned from the Order in 2022 in the wake of an independent 2020 inquiry which found that he had sexually harassed six junior court staff.

== Announcements of appointments of companions ==
A list of links to announcements of all awards appears on the Governor-General's website.

Gen = General Division; Mil = Military Division; Hon = Honorary award; Tot = Total

Date	Gazette	Topic	Gen	Tot	Mil	Tot	Hon	Tot	Total	ref
14 Feb 1975		Appointment of John Robert Kerr	1	1		0		0	1	
9 Jun 1975	1975 S113	1975 Queen's Birthday Honours (Australia) (Includes awards for H. C. "Nugget" Coombs and Patrick White who later resigned.)	6	7	2	2			9	QB 1975
1976		Resignation of Nugget Coombs (Awarded 1975 Q)	−1	6					8	
1976		Resignation of Patrick White (Awarded 1975 Q)	−1	5					7	
26 Jan 1976		1976 Australia Day Honours	5	10	1	3			13	AD 1976
7 Jun 1976		1976 Queen's Birthday Honours (Australia)	1	11					14	QB 1976
26 Jan 1977	1977 S007	1977 Australia Day Honours	2	13					16	AD 1977
11 Jun 1977	1977 S102	1977 Queen's Birthday Honours (Australia)	3	16					19	QB 1977
26 Jan 1978	1978 S015	1978 Australia Day Honours	3	19					22	AD 1978
6 Jun 1978	1978 S097	1978 Queen's Birthday Honours (Australia)	4	23					26	QB 1978
26 Jan 1979		1979 Australia Day Honours	5	28					31	AD 1979
Jun 1979		1979 Queen's Birthday Honours	4	32					35	QB 1979
26 Jan 1980		1980 Australia Day Honours	2	34					37	AD 1980
26 Jan 1980		Honorary award: Shigeo Nango					1	1	38	
Jun 1980		1980 Queen's Birthday Honours	4	38					42	QB 1980
26 Jan 1981		1981 Australia Day Honours	3	41					45	AD 1981
Jun 1981		1981 Queen's Birthday Honours	2	43					47	QB 1981
26 Jan 1982	1982 S013	1982 Australia Day Honours	4	47					51	AD 1982
26 Jan 1982		Honorary awards: Mother Teresa, Shridath Ramphal and Brian Talboys					3	4	54	
Jun 1982		1982 Queen's Birthday Honours	1	48					55	QB 1982
26 Jan 1983	1983 S013	1983 Australia Day Honours	3	51					58	AD 1983
Jun 1983	1983 S113	1983 Queen's Birthday Honours	2	53					60	QB 1983
26 Jan 1984	1984 S021	1984 Australia Day Honours	3	56					63	AD 1984
Jun 1984	1984 S212	1984 Queen's Birthday Honours	1	57	2	5			66	QB 1984
26 Jan 1985	1985 S017	1985 Australia Day Honours	4	61					70	AD 1985
17 May 1985		Honorary awards: Saburo Okita and Jørn Utzon					2	6	72	
Jun 1985	1985 S198	1985 Queen's Birthday Honours			1	6			73	QB 1985
26 Jan 1986	1986 S018	1986 Australia Day Honours	5	66					78	AD 1986
Jun 1986		1986 Queen's Birthday Honours	6	72	1	7			85	QB 1986
26 Jan 1987		1987 Australia Day Honours	3	75					88	AD 1987
26 Jan 1987		Honorary award: Tunku Abdul Rahman					1	7	89	
Jun 1987		1987 Queen's Birthday Honours	8	83	1	8			98	QB 1987
26 Jan 1988	1988 S020	1988 Australia Day Honours	13	96	1	9			112	AD 1988
26 Jan 1988		Honorary awards: Peter Gadsden and Eishiro Saitō					2	9	114	
Jun 1988	1988 S159	1988 Queen's Birthday Honours (Includes award to Brian Burke which was subsequently cancelled.)	11	107	1	10			126	QB 1988
26 Jan 1989	1989 S029	1989 Australia Day Honours	11	118					137	AD 1989
16 Feb 1989		Appointment of Bill Hayden	1	119					138	
Jun 1989	1989 S192	1989 Queen's Birthday Honours	9	128	3	13			150	QB 1989
26 Jan 1990	1990 S017	1990 Australia Day Honours	4	132					154	AD 1990
26 Jan 1990		Honorary awards: Francis Blanchard, Jacques Cousteau, Alexandre Hay, Lord Edward Shackleton and Kiri Te Kanawa					5	14	159	
Jun 1990	1990 S141	1990 Queen's Birthday Honours	9	141					168	QB 1990
26 Jan 1991	1991 S013	1991 Australia Day Honours	10	151					178	AD 1991
8 Feb 1991		Honorary awards: Turgut Özal, Geoffrey Palmer and Park Tae-joon					3	17	181	
Jun 1991	1991 S148	1991 Queen's Birthday Honours	7	158					188	QB 1991
26 Jan 1992	1992 S009	1992 Australia Day Honours	9	167	2	15			199	AD 1992
6 Feb 1992		Honorary awards: Koichiro Ejiri, Constantine Mitsotakis and Michel Rocard					3	20	202	
Jun 1992	1992 S127	1992 Queen's Birthday Honours	6	173					208	QB 1992
26 Jan 1993	1993 S008	1993 Australia Day Honours	8	181					216	AD 1993
Jun 1993	1993 S156	1993 Queen's Birthday Honours (Includes Ian MacDougall AC (mil) who does not appear in the "It's an Honour" database.)	5	186	1	16			222	QB 1993
21 Sep 1993		Honorary award: Eiji Toyoda					1	21	223	
26 Jan 1994	1994 S007	1994 Australia Day Honours	7	193	1	17			231	AD 1994
Jun 1994	1994 S190	1994 Queen's Birthday Honours	4	197					235	QB 1994
6 Jul 1994		Honorary award: Tofilau Eti Alesana					1	22	236	
26 Jan 1995	1995 S008	1995 Australia Day Honours	3	200	1	18			240	AD 1995
Jun 1995	1995 S196	1995 Queen's Birthday Honours	2	202	1	19			243	QB 1995
1995		Cancellation of award to Brian Burke (Awarded QB 1988)	−1	201					242	
26 Jan 1996	1996 S012	1996 Australia Day Honours	2	203					244	AD 1996
24 May 1996		Honorary award: Aung San Suu Kyi					1	23	245	
Jun 1996	1996 S185	2017 Special Honours List	4	207					249	2017
Jun 1996	1996 S185	1996 Queen's Birthday Honours	4	207					249	QB 1996
26 Jan 1997	1997 S013	1997 Australia Day Honours	4	211					253	AD 1997
Jun 1997	1997 S191	1997 Queen's Birthday Honours	1	212					254	QB 1997
14 Oct 1997		Honorary award: Hiroshi Saitō					1	24	255	
26 Jan 1998	1998 S014	1998 Australia Day Honours	6	218					261	AD 1998
Jun 1998	1998 S242	1998 Queen's Birthday Honours (Includes award for Richard Pratt who subsequently resigned.)	2	220					263	QB 1998
26 Jan 1999	1999 S016	1999 Australia Day Honours	5	225					268	AD 1999 pp.1–17 pg.18
Jun 1999	1999 S214	1999 Queen's Birthday Honours	3	228					271	QB 1999
Jun 1999		Honorary awards: Nelson Mandela, Shoichiro Toyoda and Rolf Zinkernagel					3	27	274	
26 Jan 2000	2000 S010	2000 Australia Day Honours	2	230					276	AD 2000
25 Mar 2000		Appointment of LtGen Peter Cosgrove			1	20			277	
Jun 2000	2000 S273	2000 Queen's Birthday Honours	4	234					281	QB 2000
26 Jan 2001	2001 S015	2001 Australia Day Honours	8	242	1	21			290	AD 2001
30 Mar 2001		Appointments of Peter Arnison, Marie Bashir and John Landy	3	245					293	
Jun 2001	2001 S186	2002 Queen's Birthday Honours	8	253					301	QB 2001
27 Aug 2001		Appointment of Marjorie Jackson-Nelson	1	254					302	
26 Jan 2002	2002 S006	2002 Australia Day Honours	8	262					310	AD 2002
Jun 2002	2002 S160	2002 Queen's Birthday Honours	8	270					318	QB 2002
26 Jan 2003	2003 S005	2003 Australia Day Honours	4	274					322	AD 2003
30 Apr 2003		Appointment of Quentin Bryce	1	275					323	
Jun 2003	2003 S169	2003 Queen's Birthday Honours	8	283					331	QB 2003
8 Jul 2003		Honorary awards: Takashi Imai and Minoru Murofushi					2	29	333	
5 Sep 2003	2003 S341	Appointment of Richard William Butler	1	284					334	
26 Jan 2004	2004 S004	2004 Australia Day Honours (Includes Dyson Heydon who does not appear in the "It's an Honour" database.)	7	291					341	AD 2004
22 Feb 2004		Appointment of Nancy Wake	1	292					342	
14 Jun 2004	2004 S167	2004 Queen's Birthday Honours	7	299					349	QB 2004
26 Jan 2005	2005 S001	2005 Australia Day Honours	7	306					356	AD 2005
1 Feb 2005	2005 S019	Honorary appointment: Goh Chok Tong					1	30	357	
13 Jun 2005	2005 S081	2005 Queen's Birthday Honours	7	313					364	QB 2005
26 Jan 2006	2006 S001	2006 Australia Day Honours (Includes Sr Mary Bernice Elphick who does not appear in the "It's an Honour" database.)	8	321					372	AD 2006
16 Mar 2006		Honorary appointment: Lee Ku-Taek					1	31	373	
12 Jun 2006	2006 S075	2006 Queen's Birthday Honours	7	328					380	QB 2006 (notes)
26 Jan 2007	2007 S002	2007 Australia Day Honours	6	334					386	AD 2007 (notes)
11 Jun 2007	2007 S100	2007 Queen's Birthday Honours (Australia)	5	339	1	22			392	QB 2007 (Gen) (Mil)
28 Sep 2007	2007 S192	Order of Wearing							392	
26 Jan 2008	2008 S001	2008 Australia Day Honours	6	345	1	23			399	AD 2008 (Gen) (Mil)
22 Feb 2008	2008 S040	Resignation of Richard Pratt (Awarded QB 1998)	−1	344					398	
9 Jun 2008	2008 S106	2008 Queen's Birthday Honours (Australia)	8	352					406	QB 2008 (notes)
4 Sep 2008	2008 S177	Honorary Appointment of Stuart Ross Taylor					1	32	407	2008 S177
26 Jan 2009	2009 S004	2009 Australia Day Honours	3	355					410	AD 2009 (notes)
8 Jun 2009	2009 S084	2009 Queen's Birthday Honours (Australia)	3	358	1	24			414	QB 2009 (notes)
26 Jan 2010	2010 S003	2010 Australia Day Honours	4	362					418	AD 2010 (Gen) (Mil)
9 Mar 2010	2010 S024	Honorary Appointment of Susilo Bambang Yudhoyono					1	33	419	2010 S24
14 Jun 2010	2010 S084	2010 Queen's Birthday Honours (Australia)	5	367					424	QB 2010 (notes)
1 Jul 2010	2010 S102	Honorary Appointment of Richard Armitage					1	34	425	2010 S102
26 Jan 2011	2011 S003	2011 Australia Day Honours	2	369	1	25			428	AD 2011 (Gen) (Mil)
13 Jun 2011	2011 S092	2011 Queen's Birthday Honours (Australia)	1	370					429	QB 2011 (notes)
29 Jun 2011		Peter Hollingworth	1	371					430	
26 Jan 2012	2012 S001	2012 Australia Day Honours	5	376					435	AD 2012 (notes)
Jun 2012		2012 Queen's Birthday Honours (Australia)	8	384					443	QB 2012 (notes)
28 Sep 2012	2012 S152	Honorary Appointment of Akio Mimura					1	35	444	2012 S152
5 Oct 2012	2012 S160	Honorary Appointment of Michelle Bachelet					1	36	445	2012 S160
26 Jan 2013		2013 Australia Day Honours	4	388					449	AD 2013 (notes }
12 Jun 2013		2013 Queen's Birthday Honours (Australia)	1	389					450	QB 2013 (notes)
12 Jun 2013		Honorary Appointment of Jill Ker Conway					1	37	451	Honorary AC
25 Nov 2013	2013 1742	Honorary Appointment of José Ramos-Horta					1	38	452	2013 1742
26 Jan 2014		2014 Australia Day Honours	7	396	1	26			460	AD 2014 (Gen} (Mil)
9 Jun 2014		2014 Queen's Birthday Honours (Australia)	7	403					467	QB 2014 (notes)
26 Jan 2015		2015 Australia Day Honours	5	408					472	AD 2015 (notes)
9 Apr 2015		Honorary Appointment of Yorihiko Kojima					1	39	473	2015 0503
8 Jun 2015		2015 Queen's Birthday Honours (Australia)	8	416					481	QB 2015 (notes)
26 Jan 2016		2016 Australia Day Honours	10	426					491	AD 2016 (notes)
13 Jun 2016		2016 Queen's Birthday Honours (Australia)	13	439					504	QB 2016 (notes)
26 Jan 2017		2017 Australia Day Honours	11	450					515	AD 2017 (notes)
12 Jun 2017		2017 Queen's Birthday Honours (Australia)	15	465					530	QB 2017(notes)
18 Jul 2017		Honorary Appointment of Sir John Key					1	40	531	2017 00815
26 Jan 2018		2018 Australia Day Honours	16	481					547	AD 2018 (notes)
11 Jun 2018		2018 Queen's Birthday Honours	10	491					557	QB 2018 (notes)
26 Jan 2019		2019 Australia Day Honours	19	510					576	AD 2019 (notes)
10 Jun 2019		2019 Queen's Birthday Honours	12	522					588	QB 2019
26 Jan 2020		2020 Australia Day Honours	5	527					593	AD 2020
8 Jun 2020		2020 Queen's Birthday Honours	3	530					596	QB 2020
26 Jan 2021		2021 Australia Day Honours	4	534					600	AD 2021
14 Jun 2021		2021 Queen's Birthday Honours	5	539					605	QB 2021
26 Jan 2022		2022 Australia Day Honours	7	546					612	AD 2022
27 Jan 2022		Honorary Appointment of Sir Barry Gibb					1	41	613	2022 G00061
13 Jun 2022		2022 Queen's Birthday Honours	8	554	1	27			622	QB 2022
10 Aug 2022		Honorary Appointment of Chuck Feeney					1	42	623	C2022 G00715
17 Aug 2022		Honorary Appointment of Zubin Mehta					1	43	624	C2022 G00734
31 Aug 2022		Honorary Appointment of Shinzo Abe					1	44	625	C2022 G00809
26 Jan 2023		2023 Australia Day Honours	6	560					631	AD 2023
11 Jun 2023		2023 King's Birthday Honours	6	560					637	KB 2023
26 Jan 2024		2024 Australia Day Honours	4	570					641	AD 2024
10 Jun 2024		2024 King's Birthday Honours	6	576					647	KB 2024

== Australian honours search facility (previously called It's an Honour) ==
- Companion of the Order of Australia
- Fact sheet
- From the Advanced search page, it is possible to produce a list of all recipients that appear in the Australian Honours Search Facility database).
  - In March 2014, there were 457 entries in the database.
  - In December 2016 there were 501 entries in the database. (Versus [508 awarded minus 3 resigned minus 1 cancelled] = 504, minus 3 not in the database = 501)
  - In September 2017 there were 512 entries in the database. (519-4=515, minus 3 = 512)
  - The list does not necessarily show all recipients of the Companion of the Order of Australia, as some awardees of Australian honours elect not to have their names appear on the Australian Honours Search Facility website.
  - The database information does not distinguish between the General and Military divisions, nor whether the award is honorary or substantive.
  - Note, however, that honorary recipients are denoted by [ H ] next to their name in the search function.
- As stated above, awards to foreigners are usually honorary, and to date, all awards to foreign Companions in the General division have been honorary. The only exception to this has been Prince Philip's appointment as AC (mil). To date there have been no Honorary Companion appointments to the Military division. This has not necessarily been the case in other grades. (For example, US General David Petraeus AO (mil) is honorary, and Prince Charles and Prince Philip's substantive knighthoods (AK) were enabled by changes to the Letters Patent.)

== See also ==
- List of knights and dames of the Order of Australia
