= Special Honours Lists (Australia) =

Australian honours announcements

The Special Honours Lists for Australia are announced by the Governor General at any time.

== Lists ==
Key (see below)

Date	Announcement	Award	Recipient	Ref	Notes
21 March 2007	Honorary Award	AO (Military)	General John Abizaid	2007-S51	
18 May 2007	Honorary Awards	AO	Professor Anne Rosalie Edwards	2007-S94	
18 May 2007	Honorary Awards	AO	Commissioner Khoo Boon Hui	2007-S94	
18 May 2007	Honorary Awards	AO	Dr Sanduk Ruit	2007-S94	
18 May 2007	Honorary Awards	AM	Associate Professor Paul Adam	2007-S94	
18 May 2007	Honorary Awards	AM	Dr Kenneth Murray Alexander	2007-S94	
18 May 2007	Honorary Awards	AM	Peter Dare	2007-S94	
18 May 2007	Honorary Awards	AM	Adjunct Professor Nicola Sasanelli	2007-S94	
18 May 2007	Honorary Awards	AM	Emeritus Professor Trevor Gordon Wilson	2007-S94	
18 May 2007	Honorary Awards	AM	Dr Helmut Ziegelschmidt	2007-S94	
18 May 2007	Honorary Awards	OAM	Peter Collingwood Cathles	2007-S94	
18 May 2007	Honorary Awards	OAM	Reginald Fredrick Guest	2007-S94	
18 May 2007	Honorary Awards	OAM	David Dale Morgan, deceased	2007-S94	wef 1 July 2005
21 June 2007	Midwinter's Day 2007	AAM	Sharon Labudda	2007-S114	
22 June 2007		Champion Shots Medal with clasp	Leading Seaman Josh Kelly	2007-S116	
21 June 2008	Midwinter's Day 2008	AAM	Matthew Filipowski	2008-S123	
10 July 2008	Honorary Awards	AO	Tan Sri Dato' Azman Hashim	2008-S137	
10 July 2008	Honorary Awards	AO	Tan Sri Dato' Seri Dr Jeffrey Cheah Fook Ling	2008-S137	
18 August 2008	Gallantry awards for actions during the Vietnam War	SG	Lieutenant Colonel Harry Smith, MC	2008-S167	
18 August 2008	Gallantry awards for actions during the Vietnam War	MG	Geoff Kendall	2008-S167	
18 August 2008	Gallantry awards for actions during the Vietnam War	MG	David Sabben	2008-S167	
4 September 2008	Honorary Awards	AC	Emeritus Professor Stuart Ross Taylor	2008-S177	
4 September 2008	Honorary Awards	AO	Malcolm Binks	2008-S177	
4 September 2008	Honorary Awards	AO	Dr J B Penn	2008-S177	
4 September 2008	Honorary Awards	AM	Lu Jian	2008-S177	
16 January 2009		VC	Trooper Mark Donaldson	2009-S10	
21 June 2009	Midwinter's Day 2009	AAM	David Pullinger	2009-S107	
23 September 2009	Honorary Awards	AM	Yoshimaro Katsumata, deceased	2009-S146	wef 29 July 2009
23 September 2009	Honorary Awards	AM	Professor Sangkot Marzuki	2009-S146	
23 September 2009	Honorary Awards	AM	Peter Morley	2009-S146	
23 September 2009	Honorary Awards	AM	Ronaldo Veirano	2009-S146	
23 September 2009	Honorary Awards	OAM	Nicholas Bonello	2009-S146	
23 September 2009	Honorary Awards	OAM	Joan Brownlie	2009-S146	
23 September 2009	Honorary Awards	OAM	Tony Cutajar	2009-S146	
23 September 2009	Honorary Awards	OAM	Khun Kanit Wanachote	2009-S146	
3 November 2009	Honorary Appointment	AO (Military)	General David Petraeus	2009-S172	
27 November 2009	Honorary Appointment	AO	The Honourable Hugh Templeton QSO	2009-S196	
27 November 2009	Honorary Appointment	AM	Brian Lara	2009-S196	
4 December 2009	Honorary Appointment	AM	Tetsuo Uehara	2009-S201	
9 March 2010	Honorary Appointment	AC	Dr Susilo Bambang Yudhoyono GCB	2010-S24	
31 March 2010	Awards for actions during the Vietnam War	DSM	Flight Lieutenant Clifford Dohle, deceased	2010-S43	
31 March 2010	Awards for actions during the Vietnam War	Unit Citation for Gallantry	Delta Company, 6th Battalion, Royal Australian Regiment	2010-S43	
1 July 2010	Honorary Appointments	AC	The Honourable Richard Armitage, KCMG, CNZM	2010-S102	
1 July 2010	Honorary Appointments	AO	Dr John David Diekman	2010-S102	
1 July 2010	Honorary Appointments	AO	General Michael Hayden	2010-S102	
1 July 2010	Honorary Appointments	AO	Dr George Nicks	2010-S102	
1 July 2010	Honorary Appointments	AM	George Lascelles, 7th Earl of Harewood, KBE	2010-S102	
1 July 2010	Honorary Appointments	AM	Zannie Flanagan	2010-S102	
1 July 2010	Honorary Appointments	AM	Hubert Huchette	2010-S102	
1 July 2010	Honorary Appointments	AM	Akira Tatehata	2010-S102	
1 July 2010	Honorary Appointments	AM	Datuk (Dr) Philip Ting Ding Ing	2010-S102	
1 July 2010	Honorary Appointments	OAM	Thomas Corcoran	2010-S102	
1 July 2010	Honorary Appointments	OAM	John Kelly	2010-S102	
1 July 2010	Honorary Appointments	OAM	Peter Reynolds	2010-S102	
1 November 2010	Honorary Appointments	AO	Moetaryanto Poerwoaminoto	2010-S202	
1 November 2010	Honorary Appointments	OAM	Sister Lorraine Garasu, CSN	2010-S202	
1 November 2010	Honorary Appointments	OAM	Brian Gavaghan	2010-S202	
1 November 2010	Honorary Appointments	OAM	Isobel Hood	2010-S202	
1 November 2010	Honorary Appointments	OAM	David Mearns	2010-S202	
5 November 2010	Honorary Appointments	AO (Military)	Admiral Michael Mullen	2010-S201	
22 January 2011		VC	Corporal Ben Roberts-Smith, MG	2011-S12	
21 June 2011	Midwinter's Day 2011	AAM	Captain Murray Doyle	2011-S99	
21 June 2011	Midwinter's Day 2011	AAM	Dr Stephen Nicol	2011-S99	
14 September 2011	Honorary Appointments	AO	The Honourable George Shultz	2011-S134	
2 December 2011	Honorary Appointments	AO	Professor James McWha	2011-S190	
2 December 2011	Honorary Appointments	AO	The Right Honourable Mike Moore, ONZ	2011-S190	
2 December 2011	Honorary Appointments	AO	Ow Chio Kiat	2011-S190	
2 December 2011	Honorary Appointments	AO	Kenneth E. Tyler	2011-S190	
2 December 2011	Honorary Appointments	AM	Sevee Charuruks	2011-S190	
2 December 2011	Honorary Appointments	AM	Catherin Chua	2011-S190	
2 December 2011	Honorary Appointments	AM	Michael Godfrey-Roberts	2011-S190	
2 December 2011	Honorary Appointments	AM	Dr Denzil Miller	2011-S190	
2 December 2011	Honorary Appointments	AM	Mustafa Ruhi Őzbilgic	2011-S190	
2 December 2011	Honorary Appointments	AM	Anne Raymond, deceased	2011-S190	wef 7 April 2010
2 December 2011	Honorary Appointments	AM	Dr Carole Webb	2011-S190	
2 December 2011	Honorary Appointments	OAM	Barry Ashbolt	2011-S190	
2 December 2011	Honorary Appointments	OAM	Francis Herman	2011-S190	
14 June 2012	Honorary Appointment	AO (Military)	General Peter van Uhm	2012-?	
21 June 2012	Midwinter's Day 2012	AAM clasp	Dr Graham Robertson, AAM	2012-?	
21 June 2012	Midwinter's Day 2012	AAM	Dr Neil Adams, deceased	2012-?	
21 June 2012	Midwinter's Day 2012	AAM	Dr Stephen Rintoul	2012-?	
21 June 2012	Midwinter's Day 2012	AAM	Dr James Doube	2012-?	
28 September 2012	Honorary Appointment	AC	Akio Mimura	2012-S152	
28 September 2012	Honorary Appointment	OAM	Masayasu Yoshimoto	2012-S152	
5 October 2012	Honorary Appointments	AC	Michelle Bachelet	2012-S160	
5 October 2012	Honorary Appointments	AO (Military)	Lt Gen James R. Clapper	2012-S160	
5 October 2012	Honorary Appointments	AM	Sachin Tendulkar	2012-S160	
2 November 2012		VC	Corporal Daniel Keighran	2012-S167	
30 November 2012	Honorary Appointments	AO	Pat Oliphant	2012-S179	
30 November 2012	Honorary Appointments	AO	Don Voelte	2012-S179	
30 November 2012	Honorary Appointments	AO	Max Yasuda	2012-S179	
30 November 2012	Honorary Appointments	AO	George Yong-Boon Yeo	2012-S179	
30 November 2012	Honorary Appointments	AM	Ar. Hijjas bin Kasturi	2012-S179	
30 November 2012	Honorary Appointments	AM	Fram Kitagawa	2012-S179	
30 November 2012	Honorary Appointments	AM	Zoran Kostovski	2012-S179	
30 November 2012	Honorary Appointments	AM	Yasuki Nakamura	2012-S179	
30 November 2012	Honorary Appointments	AM	Sir Ronald Sanders	2012-S179	
30 November 2012	Honorary Appointments	AM	William Spooncer	2012-S179	
30 November 2012	Honorary Appointments	OAM	Datuk Irene Betty Benggon-Charuruks	2012-S179	
30 November 2012	Honorary Appointments	OAM	Desmond Cross	2012-S179	
30 November 2012	Honorary Appointments	OAM	Johan Durnez	2012-S179	
30 November 2012	Honorary Appointments	OAM	Dr Hans-Ullrich Henschel	2012-S179	
30 November 2012	Honorary Appointments	OAM	Prof Jeanne M Liedtka	2012-S179	
30 November 2012	Honorary Appointments	OAM	Nellie Morgan	2012-S179	
30 November 2012	Honorary Appointments	OAM	Mario Sammut	2012-S179	
30 November 2012	Honorary Appointments	OAM	Martin Smith	2012-S179	
15 February 2013	Honorary Appointments	AO	Neil MacGregor OM	2013-S25	
15 February 2013	Honorary Appointments	AM	Bernard Wright	2013-S25	
12 June 2013	Honorary Appointment	AC	Prof Jill Ker Conway	2013QB	
20 June 2013	Gallantry awards for Far East Prisoners of War, World War II	Commendation for Gallantry	Private Alexander John Bell; Gunner Thomas Stephen Cumming; Private Victor Lawrence Gale; Gunner Arthur Reeve; Gunner James Alexander Wilson	2013-S72	
21 June 2013	Midwinter's Day 2013	AAM	Captain Scott Laughlin	2013-S68	
21 June 2013	Midwinter's Day 2013	AAM	Dr Barbara Wienecke	2013-S68	
13 November 2013	Cancellation	Commendation for Distinguished Service	Major Robin Paul Turner - Cancelled 13 November 2013	2013-1692	
25 November 2013	Honorary Appointments	AC	José Ramos-Horta	2013-1742	
25 November 2013	Honorary Appointments	AO	Dr Kurt M. Campbell CNZM	2013-1742	
25 November 2013	Honorary Appointments	AO	Sam Chisholm	2013-1742	
25 November 2013	Honorary Appointments	AO	Audette Exel	2013-1742	
25 November 2013	Honorary Appointments	AM	Dr Grace Cochrane	2013-1742	
25 November 2013	Honorary Appointments	AM	Assoc. Prof. John Heggie	2013-1742	
25 November 2013	Honorary Appointments	AM	Jules Laude	2013-1742	
25 November 2013	Honorary Appointments	AM	Richard Robinson	2013-1742	
25 November 2013	Honorary Appointments	AM	Toshio Shiba (aka Toshio Shibamoto)	2013-1742	
25 November 2013	Honorary Appointments	AM	Datuk Andrew Sim men kin	2013-1742	
25 November 2013	Honorary Appointments	AM	Yoshio Wada	2013-1742	
25 November 2013	Honorary Appointments	OAM	Robert Bedwell	2013-1742	
25 November 2013	Honorary Appointments	OAM	Kenneth Dryland	2013-1742	
13 December 2013	Honorary Appointment	AM	Jerry Lewis	2013-1862	
13 February 2014		VC	Corporal Cameron Baird, MG (deceased)	2014-294	
25 March 2014		AD	Quentin Bryce, AC, CVO		
28 March 2014		AK	General Peter Cosgrove, AC, MC		
15 April 2014	Honorary Appointment	AO (Military)	General John Allen	2014	
9 April 2015	Honorary Appointment	AC	Yorihiko Kojima	2015	
9 April 2015	Honorary Appointment	AO	Dr Patrick Simon	2015	
9 April 2015	Honorary Appointment	AM	Chitaru Asahina	2015	
9 April 2015	Honorary Appointment	OAM	Professor Haluk Oral	2015	
9 April 2015	Honorary Appointment	OAM	Yvonne Shapiro	2015	
27 May 2015	Honorary Appointment	AO	Professor Horst Lucke	2015	
27 May 2015	Honorary Appointment	AO (Military)	Admiral Samuel J. Locklear, USN	2015	
27 May 2015	Honorary Appointment	AM	Eric KarlFedering	2015	
27 May 2015	Honorary Appointment	AM	Doctor Margo Smith	2015	
27 May 2015	Honorary Appointment	AM	Inger Rice	2015	
27 May 2015	Honorary Appointment	OAM	George Edmund Morgan	2015	
21 June 2016	Midwinter's Day 2016	AAM	Dr John Frederick Cadden	2016	
21 June 2016	Midwinter's Day 2016	AAM	Kym Blair Newbery	2016	
21 June 2016	Midwinter's Day 2016	AAM	Robert William Rowland	2016	
18 July 2017	Honorary Appointment	AC	Sir John Key, GNZM	2017	
18 September 2017	Honorary Appointment	OAM	Lieutenant Colonel Freddy Edy Declerck	2017	
18 September 2017	Honorary Appointment	OAM	Gilbert Deleu	2017	
18 September 2017	Honorary Appointment	OAM	Francois Maekelberg	2017	
24 July 2018	Honorary Appointment	OAM	Dr Craig Challen	2018	
24 July 2018	Tham Luang cave rescue operation Honours	OAM	Dr Craig Challen	2018	
24 July 2018	Tham Luang cave rescue operation Honours	OAM	Dr Richard Harris	2018	
24 July 2018	Tham Luang cave rescue operation Honours	OAM	Senior Constable Justin Bateman	2018	
24 July 2018	Tham Luang cave rescue operation Honours	OAM	Leading Senior Constable Kelly Boers	2018	
24 July 2018	Tham Luang cave rescue operation Honours	OAM	Detective Leading Senior Constable Benjamin Cox	2018	
24 July 2018	Tham Luang cave rescue operation Honours	OAM	Chief Petty Officer Troy Eather	2018	
24 July 2018	Tham Luang cave rescue operation Honours	OAM	First Constable Matthew Fitzgerald	2018	
24 July 2018	Tham Luang cave rescue operation Honours	OAM	Acting Station Sergeant Robert James	2018	
24 July 2018	Tham Luang cave rescue operation Honours	OAM	Detective Leading Senior Constable Christopher Markcrow	2018	
24 July 2018	Tham Luang cave rescue operation Honours	SC	Dr Craig Challen, OAM	2018	
24 July 2018	Tham Luang cave rescue operation Honours	SC	Dr Richard Harris, OAM	2018	
24 July 2018	Tham Luang cave rescue operation Honours	BM	Senior Constable Justin Bateman, OAM	2018	
24 July 2018	Tham Luang cave rescue operation Honours	BM	Leading Senior Constable Kelly Boers, OAM	2018	
24 July 2018	Tham Luang cave rescue operation Honours	BM	Detective Leading Senior Constable Benjamin Cox, OAM	2018	
24 July 2018	Tham Luang cave rescue operation Honours	BM	Chief Petty Officer Troy Eather, OAM	2018	
24 July 2018	Tham Luang cave rescue operation Honours	BM	First Constable Matthew Fitzgerald, OAM	2018	
24 July 2018	Tham Luang cave rescue operation Honours	BM	Acting Station Sergeant Robert James, OAM	2018	
24 July 2018	Tham Luang cave rescue operation Honours	BM	Detective Leading Senior Constable Christopher Markcrow, OAM	2018	

=== Key ===
Date	Date of Announcement
Announcement	Reason for announcement
Award	see table below
Recipient	
Ref	Australian Government Gazette number
Notes	

(This table is in sort by the Award column)

Award	Name of award	See also
AAM	Australian Antarctic Medal	List of Australian Antarctic Medal recipients
AC	Honorary Companion of the Order of Australia (in the General Division)	List of honorary companions of the Order of Australia
AD	Dame of the Order of Australia	List of dames of the Order of Australia
AK	Knight of the Order of Australia	List of knights of the Order of Australia
AO	Honorary Officer of the Order of Australia (in the General Division)	
AO (Military)	Honorary Officer of the Order of Australia (in the Military Division)	
AM	Honorary Member of the Order of Australia (in the General Division)	
DSM	Distinguished Service Medal	
MG	Medal for Gallantry	List of Medal for Gallantry recipients
OAM	Honorary Medal of the Order of Australia (in the General Division)	
SG	Star of Gallantry	List of Star of Gallantry recipients
VC	Victoria Cross for Australia	List of Australian Victoria Cross recipients
