= John Laurie (disambiguation) =

John Laurie (1897–1980) was a Scottish actor.

John Laurie may also refer to:

- John Laurie (cricketer) (1938-2006), South African cricketer
- John Laurie (Australian engineer) (1931–2022), Australian consultant engineer
- John Wimburn Laurie (1835-1912), soldier and political figure in Nova Scotia and England
- Mount John Laurie, Canadian mountain named after John Lee Laurie, a founder of the Indian Association of Alberta

== See also ==
- Emilius Bayley (John Robert Laurie Emilius Bayley, 1823–1917), English baronet and cricketer
