= 1972 Special Honours (Australia) =

Honours awarded by the sovereign

The Special Honours Lists for Australia are announced by the Sovereign and Governor-General at any time.

Some honours are awarded by other countries where Queen Elizabeth II was the Head of State, Australians receiving those honours are listed here with the relevant reference.

This list also incorporates the Mid Winters Day honours list and the Bravery honours lists.

== Order of the British Empire ==
Ribbon bar of the Order of the British Empire (Military Division)

=== Knight Commander of the Order of the British Empire (KBE) ===
Civil Division

- The Honourable Mr. Justice Anthony Frank Mason.

=== Commander of the Order of the British Empire (CBE) ===
Military Division

- Colonel Donald David Weir, MBE, 1120, Australian Staff Corps - 13 July 1972
- Colonel John Robert Salmon, 3401, Australian Staff Corps - 13 July 1972
- Colonel John Gordon Hooton, 2305, Australian Staff Corps - 13 July 1972
- Air Commodore Neville McNamara, AFC, 011353, Royal Australian Air Force - 13 July 1972
- Group Captain Roberts Hunter Martin, AFC, 022188, Royal Australian Air Force - 13 July 1972

=== Officer of the Order of the British Empire (OBE) ===
Military Division

- Lieutenant Colonel Bruce Richmond Topfer, 235013, Royal Australian Artillery - 13 July 1972

=== Member of the Order of the British Empire (MBE) ===
Military Division

- Major Trevor Ronald Phillips, 13032, Royal Australian Signals - 13 July 1972

== Distinguished Service Order ==
Ribbon bar of the Distinguished Service Order

=== Companion of the Distinguished Service Order (DSO) ===
- Brigadier Bruce Alexander McDonald, OBE, MC, 3392, Australian Staff Corps - 13 July 1972
- Lieutenant-Colonel James Cumow Hughes, MC, 47001, Royal Australian Infantry - 13 July 1972
- Lieutenant-Colonel Francis Peter Scott, 335011, Royal Australian Infantry - 13 July 1972
- Wing Commander Peter William Mahood, 052901, Royal Australian Air Force - 13 July 1972

== Military Cross (MC) ==
Ribbon bar of the Military Cross

- Major (Temporary) Jeremy Hepworth Taylor, 311452, Royal Australian Infantry - 13 July 1972
- Second Lieutenant Bruce Cameron, 312785, Royal Australian Armoured Corps - 13 July 1972
- Lieutenant Graham John Kells, 235390, Royal Australian Infantry - 13 July 1972
- Second Lieutenant Gary John McKay, 2789609, Royal Australian Infantry - 13 July 1972

== Distinguished Flying Cross (DFC) ==
Ribbon bar of the Distinguished Flying Cross

- Wing Commander Colin Leonard Ackland, 014204, Royal Australian Air Force - 13 July 1972
- Squadron Leader Kenneth David Clark, 052789, Royal Australian Air Force - 13 July 1972
- Squadron Leader Stanley Clark, 0217663, Royal Australian Air Force - 13 July 1972
- Flight Lieutenant Norman Melville Goodall, 043963, Royal Australian Air Force - 13 July 1972
- Second Lieutenant Michael John Sonneveld, 3112007, Australian Army Aviation Corps - 13 July 1972
- Lieutenant Terence John Michael Hayes, 39545, Australian Army Aviation Corps - 13 July 1972

== Distinguished Conduct Medal (DCM) ==
Ribbon bar of the Distinguished Conduct Medal

- Private Peter John Fyfe, 61712, Royal Australian Infantry - 13 July 1972

== Military Medal (MM) ==
Ribbon bar of the Military Medal

- Private Robert Ward Payne, 4721506, Royal Australian Infantry - 13 July 1972
- Corporal Michael John O'Sullivan, 55745, Royal Australian Army Medical Corps - 13 July 1972
- Corporal (Temporary) Raymond Walsh, 39567, Royal Australian Army Medical Corps - 13 July 1972

== British Empire Medal (BEM) ==
Ribbon bar of the British Empire Medal (Military Division)

Military Division

- Warrant Officer Class II (Temporary) Dennis Morton, 34833, Royal: Australian Engineers - 13 July 1972

== Mentioned in Dispatches ==
Mentioned in dispatches device

- Colonel Geoffrey John Leary, 648 - 13 July 1972
- Wing Commander Elvin Jack Felton, 025166 - 13 July 1972
- Major Richard John Godfrey Hall, 52202 - 13 July 1972
- Warrant Officer Class I William James Hill, 26744 - 13 July 1972
- Captain Donald David McKenzie, 16550 - 13 July 1972
- Major John Stuart Baker, 335106 - 13 July 1972
- Chaplain Roger Howard Boerth, 0318567 - 13 July 1972
- Lieutenant Paul Ellis Green, 235345 - 13 July 1972
- Trooper Daniel John Handley, 1203040 - 13 July 1972
- Private Kevin George Casson, 511381 - 13 July 1972
- Corporal Trevor William Byng, 311639 - 13 July 1972
- Sergeant Frank Carr Cashmore, 54237 - 13 July 1972
- Warrant Officer Class II Brian Francis McRath, 37738 - 13 July 1972
- Warrant Officer Class II (Temporary) Allen Brian Clutterbuck, 311492 - 13 July 1972
- Captain Rodney Michael Earle, 335157 - 13 July 1972
- Major Gordon Francis Bute Rickards, 12456 - 13 July 1972
- Corporal Douglas Melrose, 1734309 - 13 July 1972
- Major (Temporary) Ivan James Cahill, 335151 - 13 July 1972
- Corporal Ian Bennet Noel White, 146093 - 13 July 1972
- Sergeant Thomas Raymond Swallow, 36940 - 13 July 1972
- Sergeant (Temporary) Daryl Kenneth Jenkin, 4410534 - 13 July 1972
- Sergeant Gary John Chad, 216372 - 13 July 1972
- Warrant Officer Class II Byron Henry Cox, 16895 - 13 July 1972
- Corporal Andrew Martin Anderson, 1200348 - 13 July 1972
- Major (Temporary) Anthony Paul Williams, 235209 - 13 July 1972
- Major Keith Frederick Towning, 52417 - 13 July 1972
- Captain Raymond John Phillips, 18582 - 13 July 1972
- Second Lieutenant Kevin Michael Byrne, 1202372 - 13 July 1972
- Major Graeme John Loughton, 335095 - 13 July 1972
- Corporal David William Dean, 447148 - 13 July 1972
- Trooper Peter Stanley Cadge, 3798399 - 13 July 1972
- Major Neil Hilton Harden, 27240 - 13 July 1972
- Squadron Leader Ian Hamilton Whisker, 0218759 - 13 July 1972
- Captain Rowan Edward Monteith, 1200935 - 13 July 1972
- Flight Lieutenant Bruce John Stewart Mouatt, 0222080 - 13 July 1972
- Flying Officer Jeffrey Philip Trappett, 0117198 - 13 July 1972
- Flying Officer Robert Lawrence Redman, 0224385 - 13 July 1972
- Flying Officer Rhys Northwood James, 0119113 - 13 July 1972
- Sergeant Terence John Pinkerton, DFM, (A216972) - 13 July 1972
- Sergeant Gregory Stuart Love, A211438 - 13 July 1972
- Corporal Keith John Munns, A4S385 - 13 July 1972
