= Kaarene Fitzgerald =

Australian activist

- Born: 12 December 1944; Te Kūiti, New Zealand
- Died: 24 May 2003; Melbourne, Victoria, Australia

Kaarene Noelle Fitzgerald, AC (12 December 1944 – 24 May 2003) was an Australian advocate for the study and treatment of Sudden Infant Death. Fitzgerald founded the Sudden Infant Death Research Foundation (known as SIDS & Kids) on 11 July 1977. The organization began the day after her son Glenn died from an unexplainable death, known as a Sudden Infant Death.

This was the first NGO of its kind in Australia. In 1999, she was appointed Companion of the Order of Australia for her services to the community and for "coordination of world-wide efforts to develop and research educational strategies to reduce sudden infant death in infancy".

She was responsible for the development of a direct referral system involving the Foundation, the Health Department, State Coroner's office, Ambulance Service and hospitals. In 1988, Fitzgerald established Red Nose Day as a fundraising activity and convinced other state based SIDS bodies to join the fundraising activity. It became a signature national fundraising "day" in Australia.

Internationally, Fitzgerald co-founded SIDS International and was the inaugural executive and then chairman of the group from 1989 - 1992. She then developed a network of research coordination - the Global Strategy Task Force.

In 1991, Fitzgerald was approached to help establish the Monash Research Foundation for Reproduction and Development. This group became the Ritchie Centre. Fitzgerald's commitment to research was honored with the Ritchie Centre's annual Kaarene Fitzgerald public forum.

Fitzgerald was born in Te Kūiti, New Zealand and died in Melbourne, Australia on 24 May 2003, after a long battle with cancer. She was survived by her four children, Karl, Anita, Lacey & Michael.

== Awards ==
- Bowater Scott Achievement Award 1982
- Australian Jaycees Five Outstanding Young Australians (Victorian Award 1983, Australian Award 1983)
- Companion of the Order of Australia, Australia Day Honours List, 1999
- Avon-Woman’s Day Spirit of Achievement Award 1999
- Australian of the Year Awards 2000 - one of five Australian Achievers.
