= Jim Leslie (businessman) =

Australian corporate executive (1922–2012)

James Bolton Leslie AC MC
- Born: November 27, 1922; Melbourne, Victoria, Australia
- Died: May 28, 2012 (aged 89)
- Occupation: Business executive
- Known for: First Australian managing director of Mobil Oil Australia; Chairman of Qantas (1979–1989); Chancellor of Deakin University (from 1987)
- Awards: Military Cross (MC); Officer of the Order of Australia (AO), 1984; Companion of the Order of Australia (AC), 1993

James Bolton Leslie AC MC (27 November 1922–28 May 2012) was the first Australian managing director of Mobil Oil Australia, was chairman of Qantas for 10 years and was chancellor of Deakin University.

Born 27 November 1922 in Melbourne, he grew up in country Victoria, moving back to Melbourne for high school. During World War II he served in New Guinea where he was mentioned in despatches and earned a Military Cross (MC). After the war he joined Mobil Oil Australia where in 1971 he became the first Australian to be appointed as managing director. In 1979 he left Mobil and became chairman of Qantas, a position he held for 10 years under both Liberal and Labor governments. In 1987, he was appointed chancellor of Deakin University and eventually received an Honorary Doctorate of Laws.

Leslie was made an Officer of the Order of Australia (AO) in 1984 and elevated to a Companion (AC) in 1993.

He died on 28 May 2012.
