= Howard Michell =

Australian industrialist and philanthropist (1913 – 2012)

George Howard Michell AC (3 August 1913 – 26 June 2012) was an Australian wool merchant, industrialist and philanthropist.

He was a director of the family company, GH Michell and Sons, for 60 years, and instrumental in its rise to be the largest wool processing company in the world.

Born in Adelaide, South Australia, Michell was educated at Prince Alfred College.

== Early life ==
Michell was born in Adelaide on 3 August 1913 to George Howard Michell and Annie Jane Walters

Michell was an active sportsman his whole life. He was a rower in the school First Eight, and later the Old Boy's Eight. In 1935 he joined the Adelaide Aero Club

On 3 December 1938 Michell married Christine Valerie Tipping at St. Andrew's Church, Walkerville.

=== Mt Bogong tragedy ===
In August 1936, at the age of 23, Michell set out on a cross-country skiing expedition to Mount Bogong, Victoria with two experienced skiers, Cleve Cole and Mick Hull. Leaving Hotham Heights on 5 August, they set out across the Bogong High Plains carrying provisions for several days. They intended to reach the summit of Mt Bogong and then continue over the far side to the Staircase Hut, in which they had stored provisions for the return trip during the summer. On 6 August they were overcome by the worst blizzard in several years. The men dug a snow cave and waited four days for the blizzard to end. On 9 August, with food already running short, they decided to make a break for the Staircase Hut, but lost their way in the whiteout conditions. They were unable to retrace their steps, and therefore wandered for five days without food, descending the wrong side of Mt Bogong in the fog. On the 14th, the men reached Big River Valley and sought refuge in a hollow log, but they were severely weakened from exhaustion, starvation and exposure. Cole was unable to continue, and it was decided that Hull should stay with him while Michell set out in search of help.

Late on the night of 16 August Michell reached the settlement at Glen Valley and raised the alarm. Search parties totalling eighty men set out the following morning. Michell, suffering frostbite to his hands and feet, was taken to Omeo hospital by car. All of his toes had to be amputated.

A party of seven searchers located Hull and Cole early on the 18th. Using improvised stretchers, they were brought to Glen Valley. Hull began to recover but little hope was held for Cole, who was delirious and badly frostbitten. Cole died late on the night of the 19th.

The following year, the Royal Humane Society of Australasia awarded Michell and Hull each a silver medal for gallantry. The ordeal led to the establishment of snow-lines and series of refuge huts on Bogong to render shelter to future skiers; these include the Cleve Cole Hut (built 1937) and Michell Hut (1967). Michell Hut was burnt in the bushfires of 2003, and a replacement built in 2005.

== GH Michell and Sons ==
A couple of years after the Mt Bogong tragedy, Michell became managing director of the family company, GH Michell and Sons, then based at Hindmarsh. During his time, the company was buying 10–15% of the entire Australian wool clip.

In the 1940s after the imperative of wartime production had passed, Michell set about modernising the company's operations. State-of-the-art British Combing machines were imported, using both the traditional Noble type and the more efficient French type. This enabled an increase in the overall output of wool tops by 30%, as well as the use of shorter-fibered wool varieties, which previously had been sent overseas for processing. The quality of tops was also improved by this method, producing wool suitable for the manufacture of fine clothing. In 1947, Michell pioneered an incentive wage scheme at the company's Hindmarsh and Fremantle processing facilities, whereby the typical worker could earn an average of 27% above the award wage for production beyond standard output levels.

Michell consolidated its operations to its present Salisbury site in 1973. He also drove an international expansion of the company's wool and tannery operation, particularly in China and Ireland. In 1987, when the company closed down its wool processing operations at Botany Bay, Michell established an 8 ha (20-acre) industrial park, Lakes Business Park, on the site.

== Philanthropy ==
Howard and Christine Michell were keen supporters of the performing and visual arts. They made considerable contributions to the Art Gallery of South Australia, both financially and of works. They were involved in setting up the gallery's foundation in 1980. They also set up an endowment fund to support and purchase the works of young and emerging artists.

In 1990 Michell was appointed a Companion of the Order of Australia for his services to the wool industry and the arts.
