= Ross Dunning =

Ross William Dunning AC FCILT FAIM FIEAust FIRSE (born 4 March 1942) served as the Commissioner for Railways in Queensland, President of the Australian Railways Association and as chairman and director for a number of public and listed companies including Chairman of Port of Brisbane Corporation, Chairman of Port of Townsville Limited, Chairman of the Central Queensland Ports Authority, Director General of Administrative Services for the Queensland Government from 1990 to 1994, Director of Brisbane Airport Corporation Pty Ltd. and many others.

In 2002 he was appointed a Companion of the Order of Australia (AC) "For service to the development of transport systems, particularly the development of modern and efficient rail services, to the export economy, to the construction industry, and to the community through support for cultural activities and charitable organisations."
