= Adele Green =

Australian epidemiologist

Professor Adele Green AC FAA FAHMS
- Born: Adele Chandler Green; 20 September 1952 (age 74); Cairns, Queensland, Australia
- Known for: Research into melanoma
- Scientific career
- Fields: Epidemiology
- Workplaces: QIMR Berghofer Medical Research Institute

Adele Chandler Green (born 20 September 1952) is an Australian epidemiological senior scientist at the QIMR Berghofer Medical Research Institute in Brisbane, Queensland, Australia. She is the institute's head of Cancer and Population Studies Group.

Green is an international leader in the epidemiology of melanoma and skin cancer. She is best known for her contributions to the area of melanoma prevention, for which in 2013 she received the Queensland Australian of the Year Award and The Australian Financial Review and Westpac 100 Women of Influence Award.

== Education ==
Green was educated at the University of Queensland medical school in the 1970s. Despite considering a career in English literature or diplomatic service, she chose medicine due to her interest in biology, as well as being influenced by well-known female scientists such as Marie Curie. She received 1st class honours in Medicine and worked as a clinician for several years before receiving her PhD in epidemiology in 1984 from the University of Queensland. Green also holds an M.Sc. from the London School of Hygiene and Tropical Medicine.

== Research highlights ==
In 1986, Green began her 20-year landmark study in the rural Queensland town of Nambour of sunscreen usage, where half of 1621 participants applied sunscreen daily and the rest maintained previous sporadic sunscreen application habits. These participants were followed initially for 10 years, with the results showing the application of sunscreen halved the chance of developing melanoma. This ground-breaking randomised controlled trial of long-term sunscreen application in an Australian community provided the scientific basis for clinical and public health advice about sunscreen use for skin cancer prevention.

Her other significant contributions include insight into risk factors for ovarian cancer and into the burden of cancer in Indigenous Australians. Green has received international awards and is a recognised advocate for cancer control, including through longstanding membership on national and international scientific and advisory councils. She has trained and mentored a generation of epidemiologists and clinician-scientists. Green has also done research into other cancers, such as esophageal cancer and ovarian cancer. Studies of these cancers occurred in 2008 in the research project 'Towards Cancer Control — population and molecular strategies'.

== Professional career ==
In 1985, using a Neil Hamilton Fairley Postdoctoral Travelling Fellowship awarded by the Australian National Health and Medical Research Council (NHMRC), she travelled to the UK, where at the London School of Hygiene & Tropical Medicine she earned an MSc in epidemiology. During this time she also served as a visiting lecturer in medicine at Harvard Medical School, Boston, US. Green joined QIMR's Epidemiology and Population Health Unit in 1996 and was appointed a senior principal research fellow. She was the visiting medical research officer at the Wellcome Trust in London in 1997. From 2000 to 2011 Green acted as the deputy director to QIMR. During this time period she simultaneously operated in a variety of roles: in 2000 as the head of Cancer and Population Studies Group in QIMR, in 2002 as a professor at both the University of Queensland and the Queensland University of Technology. In 2005 she was appointed as an adjunct professor at Griffith University and in 2009 as a professor at the Institute of Inflammation and Repair, as well as at the University of Manchester. In 2010 she was appointed as the acting director of QIMR. In 2014 she served as a senior research scientist at the Cancer Research UK Manchester Institute at the University of Manchester. She is currently a senior scientist at QIMR, a position she has held since 2012.

Green has served on many Australian research bodies, such as the Australian Cancer Research Foundation's Medical Research Advisory Committee, the National Public Health Partnership, and the National Health and Medical Research Council and was Chair of the NHMRC's Health Advisory Committee (2000-2005). Apart from Australian research bodies, she has also served on many committees at the International Agency for Research on Cancer (IARC) in Lyon, France. These have included: Chair of the Working Group on Artificial UV and Skin Cancer in 2005, member of the Working Group on Code of Good Practice for IARC Researchers (2006-2008), and member of the Working Party for the Monograph on Radiation and Cancer in 2009. Green also serves as a member of the International Commission on Non-Ionising Radiation Protection and its Epidemiology Standing Committee.

== Personal life ==
In her 20s she was self-proclaimed "sun-worshipper". Green hikes as a hobby. She is a mother.

== Recognition and awards ==
- 2004: Named in the Australian Honours List as a Companion of the Order of Australia
- 2013: Overall Winner of Australian Financial Review and Westpac Women of Influence Awards
- 2013: Queensland's Australian of the Year
- 2013: Australasian Epidemiological Association Life Membership Award
- 2013: The University of Queensland Vice-Chancellor's Alumnus Excellence Award
- 2013: Jack Elkington Oration, Public Health Association of Australia, Queensland
- 2013: Ralph Doherty QIMR Berghofer Prize for Outstanding Achievement and Leadership in Medical Research ‘Queensland Great’ Award
- 2014: 'Queensland Great' Award
- 2015: Fellow, Australian Academy of Health and Medical Sciences
- 2020: Fellow, Australian Academy of Science
