= Peter Botten =

Australian business executive

Peter Robert Botten AC
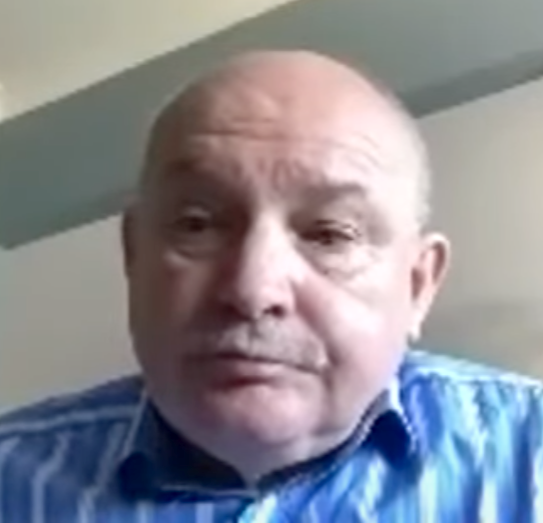
- In a Lowy Institute online discussion in 2020
- Education: Monash University
- Occupation: Business executive

Peter Robert Botten AC is an Australian business executive who served as the managing director of Oil Search, a Papua New Guinea-based oil and gas exploration and development company, from 1994 to 2020. He was appointed a Commander of the Order of the British Empire (CBE) in 2007, and awarded Australia's highest civilian honour, Companion of the Order of Australia, in 2019.

== Early life and education ==
Botten's father was a pilot for the Royal Air Force, and he grew up in Britain. He earned a degree in geology from Monash University in Melbourne, and later he completed a Postgraduate Diploma in Petroleum Engineering at the Royal School of Mines at Imperial College London.

== Career ==
He was hired by the French government and after an initial posting to Canada was sent to Niger, one of several African countries he worked in over the next few years.

In 1992, he joined Oil Search as general manager of operations, and was appointed as managing director two years later. During his tenure as managing director, the company grew significantly and became a major player in the oil and gas industry in Papua New Guinea. Botten has been credited with developing important partnerships between Oil Search and the government of Papua New Guinea, as well as with international investors. The expansion included the company's entry into liquefied natural gas production in a project which commenced production in 2014, involving a consortium of companies including ExxonMobil and TotalEnergies. He also played a key role in negotiating a landmark liquefied natural gas agreement with the Papua New Guinea government in 2009.

Botten retired from his position as managing director in 2020, but he remains a senior advisor to the company.

In addition to his work with Oil Search, Botten has also been involved with various industry and community organizations. He has served as the chairman of the Papua New Guinea Chamber of Mines and Petroleum, as a director of the Australia-PNG Business Council, the World Economic Forum's Oil and Gas Climate Initiative, and chairman of the Business Council of Papua New Guinea. At the request of the Papua New Guinean Prime Minister Peter O'Neill, Botton took on the role as chairman of the board of Tari hospital.

Botten has also served as a director of several other companies, including the Business Council of Australia, the Melbourne Symphony Orchestra, and the Australian Petroleum Production & Exploration Association. Since 2016, he has been a non-executive director of AGL Energy, becoming chairman in 2021 and 2022. Following this departure, he became chairman of Conrad Asia Energy and in 2024, he took on the role of chairman of the solar developer Vast Renewables.

== Awards and honours ==
Botten was awarded the Papua New Guinea Independence Medal in 2000.

In 2005, he was profiled as one of "the leading chief executives in the country" by Roger Maynard in his book "Life at the Top".

He was appointed a Commander of the Order of the British Empire (CBE) in 2007 for services to the oil and gas industry in PNG and contributions to the community sector.

In 2015, the Harvard Business Review and Australian Financial Review included him as one of two Australians among the world's 100 top-performing CEOs.

He was appointed a Companion of the Order of Australia (AC) in the 2019 Australia Day Honours "for eminent service to Australia-Papua New Guinea relations, particularly in the oil and gas industry, and to social and economic initiatives".

== Personal life ==
Botten is married to Gill and they have two children. He is a supporter of various charitable organizations, including the Papua New Guinea Red Cross and the Papua New Guinea Cancer Foundation.

== See also ==
- Mining in Papua New Guinea
