= Alice Elphick =

Australian nun

Alice Nolan Elphick, AC, OBE (4 August 1921 – 20 June 2008), probably better known as Sister Mary Bernice Elphick, was a nun of the Sisters of Charity of Australia with a long and prestigious record of service to health.

== Biography ==
Elphick was born on 4 August 1921, in country Victoria (Foster, South Gippsland), to Herbert and Sarah Elphick. Her father was both a farmer and a railway engineer. Alice had three brothers and two sisters. Elphick completed her high school education and nursing training in Melbourne.

She entered the Novitiate of the Sisters of Charity on 2 July 1943, and was professed on 14 January 1946, taking the name Sister (Sr.) Bernice.

Elphick first appointment was in 1946 at St Vincent's Hospital in Sydney. She proceeded through a number of positions at various St Vincent's Hospitals around the country. From 1957-1962, she served as the Mother Rectress in Launceston and, from 1963, she served as the Mother Rectress in Sydney, managing the hospital as well as the Convent.

== Awards and honours ==
In recognition of her service, Elphick was appointed an Officer of the Order of the British Empire (OBE) in 1977, a Member of the Order of Australia (AM) in 1986, and a Companion of the Order of Australia (AC) in 2006.

== Death and legacy ==
In 2002, a fund-raising rose for the Victor Chang Institute was named after her.

In 2004, a wing at the St Vincent's Hospital in Darlinghurst was named in her honour.

Elphick retired in 1997, and died at the St Joseph's Aged Care Facility, Kensington (Sydney) on 20 June 2008.
