= Alexandre Hay =

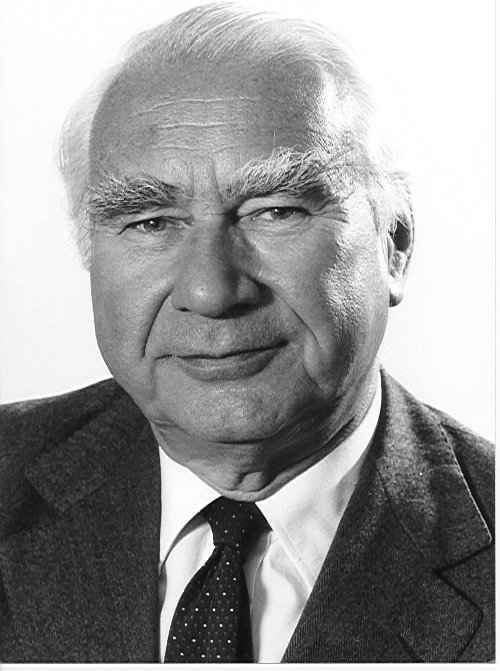
Alexandre Hay

Alexandre Hay (29 October 1919 – 23 August 1991) was a Swiss lawyer. From 1966 to 1976 he was Vice President of the Board of the Swiss National Bank. Later, from 1976 to 1987 he was President of the International Committee of the Red Cross (ICRC).

== Biography ==
Hay was born on 29 October 1919 to Frédérik and Lydia Hay-Trachsler in Bern. The majority of his youth was spent in the politically tense pre-war climate of Geneva. There he studied law at the College of Geneva and passed the bar exam in 1944. From 1942 to 1945 he worked as a lawyer in Geneva.

In 1945 Hay went to work for the consular service of the Federal Department of Foreign Affairs in Paris. A year later he was appointed Attaché de légation. Then in 1948 he was promoted to Class II Secretary of Legation making him responsible for Swiss economic and financial interests in France.

In 1952 became an executive member of the European Payments Union. A year later he became department head for the Zurich branch of the Swiss National Bank. From 1955 to 1966 he was director and assistant director of the department of the Second Bank of Bern. From 1966 to 1976 he was vice president and general manager of the executive board of the bank.

Hay was married in 1945 to Hélène Morin of France. They had two sons and two daughters. After the death of his wife in 1973 he married a second time, to Verena Vogler in 1980.

== ICRC Presidency ==
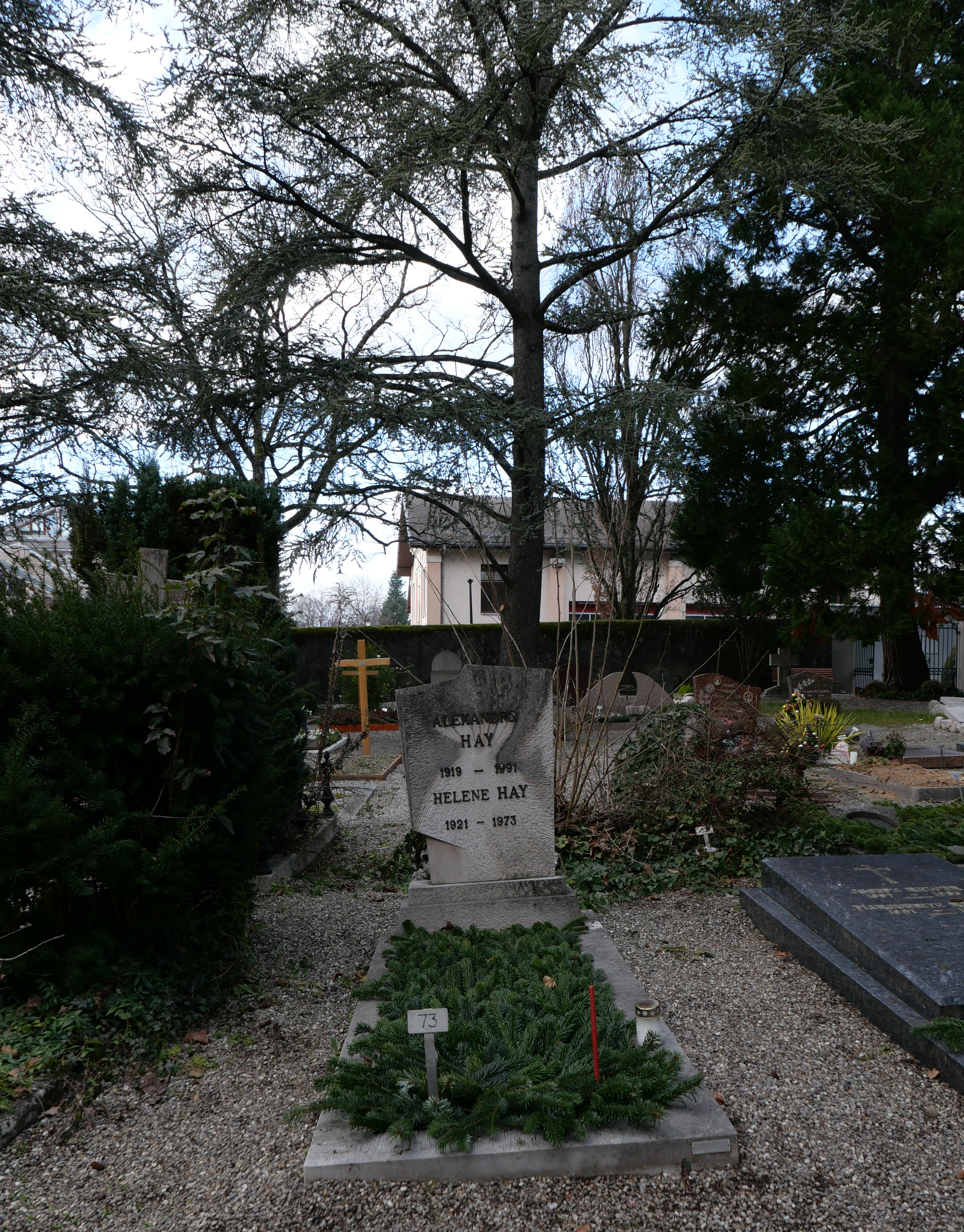
The grave of Hay and his wife Helene (1921-1973) at the cemetery of Chêne-Bougeries

In 1975, Hay became a member of the International Committee of the Red Cross (ICRC). A year later, on 1 July 1976, he took over as president of the committee, succeeding Eric Martin. By the end of the year, he shared the presidency with Roger Gallopin, the president of the Assembly Council, before he took over this function.

During his eleven years as president the budget increased from 50 million to 250 million CHF and the number of staff and delegates tripled. This was partially due to the steady increase in the number and duration of armed conflicts.

During his tenure, 250,000 refugees were removed from Cambodia by the Thai government. Increasingly, governments began ignoring their commitments under the Geneva Conventions and others. From 1980 to 1988, chemical weapons were deployed in fighting during the Iran–Iraq War in violation of their commitment under the Geneva Conventions. Hay repeatedly protested against these violations but with no significant result.

Hay was especially concerned with establishing good relations between the ICRC and various Red Cross and Red Crescent societies around the world.

His successor was Cornelio Sommaruga who took over in 1987 but Hay remained a member of the ICRC until 1989.

== Awards ==
- Honorary doctorate from the University of St. Gallen
- Honorary doctorate from the University of Geneva
- In 1990 he was appointed an honorary Companion of the Order of Australia, "for eminent service to humanity at large".
