= Akio Mimura =

Japanese businessman

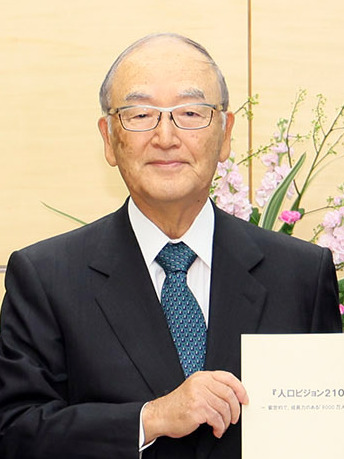
January 2024

Akio Mimura (三村明夫, Mimura Akio; born 2 November 1940) AC is a prominent Japanese businessman notable for his positions at the head of Nippon Steel and Sumitomo Metal Corporation, and as Chairman of the Japan-Australia Business Cooperation Committee, for which the Australian government awarded him their highest civilian award for a foreigner, Honorary Companion of the Order of Australia.

Mimura is 19th Chairman of Japan Chamber of Commerce of Industry(JCCI) since 2013, which is the largest small and medium business association with 1,250,000 corporate members in Japan.

== Biography ==
Akio Mimura was born 2 November 1940 in Gunma Prefecture and was educated at the University of Tokyo (B.A. 1963) and Harvard Business School (M.B.A. 1972). In April 1963 he joined Fuji Iron & Steel Co Ltd which became part of Nippon Steel in 1970, which in turn became part of Nippon Steel & Sumitomo Metal in 2012. He rose through various senior management positions in the 1980s, becoming a board member in 1993 and Managing Director in 1997.

== Board and committee positions ==
Period	Position	Organisation
November 2013 - current	Chairman	Japan Chamber of Commerce and Industry
November 2013 - current	Chairman	Tokyo Chamber of Commerce and Industry
October 2012 - current	Advisor Honorary Chairman	Nippon Steel & Sumitomo Metal Corporation
April 2008 - October 2012	Chairman	Nippon Steel Corporation
April 2003 - April 2008	President	Nippon Steel Corporation
April 2000 - April 2003	Executive Vice President	Nippon Steel Corporation
April 1997 - April 2000	Managing Director	Nippon Steel Corporation
June 1993 - October 2012	Director	Nippon Steel Corporation
? - current	Vice Chairman and Director	Nippon Keidanren
? - ?	Vice Chairman	World Steel Association
? - current	Director	Nisshin Seifun Group Inc
? - current	Outside Director	Development Bank of Japan Inc
? - current	Committee Member	Innovation Network Corporation of Japan
June 2010 - current	Outside Director	Tokio Marine Holdings Inc.
? - current	Member, Advisory Board	Mitsubishi UFJ Financial Group, Inc
? - current	Member, Advisory Board	Development Bank of Japan
? - current	Member, International Advisory Board	Rolls-Royce Holdings plc.

== Honours and awards ==
- September 2012: Honorary Companion of the Order of Australia
- October 2012: Doctor of Science, honoris causa, Australian National University
