= John Laurie (Australian engineer) =

Australian consultant engineer (1931–2022)

John Laurie AC
- Born: 18 September 1931; Adelaide, Australia
- Died: 2 April 2022 (aged 90)
- Occupation: Civil Engineer

John Buxton Laurie AC (18 September 1931 – 2 April 2022) was an Australian civil engineer. In 2003 he was awarded Australia's highest civilian honour, Companion of the Order of Australia, for his services to engineering and to community support.

== Early life and education ==
Laurie was born to Joan and Robin Laurie on 18 September 1931 in Adelaide, Australia.

== Career ==
In 1977, when he was the managing director of Maunsell and Partners (Consulting Engineers and Planners), he was appointed to assist the Chief Judge heading the judicial inquiry to investigate the causes of the Granville rail disaster. He was Chairman of the Melbourne City Link Authority. He served as the president of the Associations of Professional and Consultative Engineers.

=== Professional and community service ===
In 2001, the Powerhouse Museum (then called the Museum of Applied Arts and Sciences) partnered with the Australian Academy of Technological Sciences and Engineering to put on "Australia Innovates". Laurie was one of the key contributors.

=== Selected works ===
- Laurie, JB; Evans, ME (1975). "Welded Steel Bridges A Trends and Developments". Les Ponts en Acier Soudés - Tendances et Développements (in French). Hobart.
- Laurie, JB; Tickner, ND (1976). "Bridges-Design. Australian scene, including Railway Bridges". Symp. Prestressed Concr. Short Medium Span Bridges. Proc. Sydney: 1–10.
- Laurie, J. B. (January 1984). "The Forms of Australian Overseas Consultancy". The Engineering Conference 1984: Conference Papers: 118–121. ISBN 0858252155.
- Laurie, J. B.; Robertson, R. H. S.; Vicente, M. A. (August 1986). "The restoration of buildings constructed with Menorcan limestone". Quarterly Journal of Engineering Geology and Hydrogeology. 19 (3): 283–289. doi:10.1144/GSL.QJEG.1986.019.03.05.
- "Bridges". Technology in Australia 1788-1988. Australian Academy of Technological Sciences and Engineering; Australian Science and Technology Heritage Centre. 1988. pp. 358–361. ISBN 0-908029-49-7.
- Laurie, J. B. (May–June 2000). "Melbourne City Link project: a view near the finishing line". ATSE Focus (112): 10–16.

== Honours and awards ==
In 1994, Laurie was appointed a Fellow of the Australian Academy of Technological Sciences and Engineering (FTSE). In 2001, Laurie was awarded the Australian Centenary Medal in recognition of his service to environmental science and technology. In 2003, he received the Peter Nicol Russell Memorial Medal - Career Achievement Award in Engineering from the Institution of Engineers Australia. This is described as "the most prestigious award conferred by Engineers Australia. It’s presented annually to an Honorary Fellow of Engineers Australia who has made a notable contribution to the science or practice of engineering in Australia."

In the 2003 Queen's Birthday honours, Laurie was appointed a Companion of the Order of Australia "for service to consulting engineering in Australia, to the export of engineering services overseas, and to community support in education, health and major infrastructure developments."

== Personal life ==
Laurie was married to Imogen Dymphna, and they had four children: Mandy, Rob, Tim and Emma.

Laurie was the great-grandson of Buxton Forbes Laurie, for whom he was named, who migrated from England to Australia in 1848. John Laurie hosted a reunion of Buxton Laurie's descendants in 1976, reported as either 150 or 220 people.

He died on 2 April 2022, of natural causes.
