= Yorihiko Kojima =

Japanese businessman

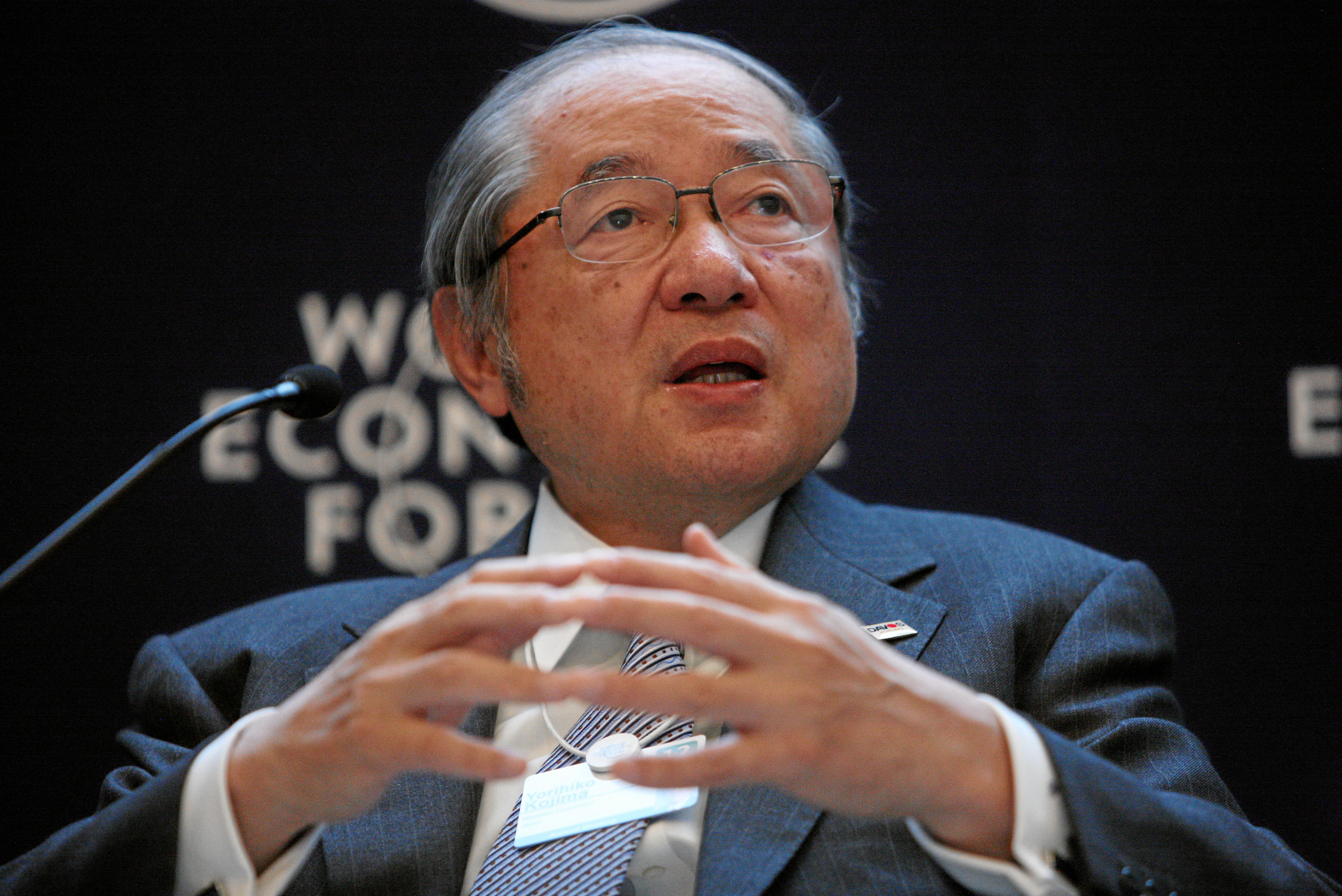
Kojima at the World Economic Forum Annual Meeting in 2013

Yorihiko Kojima (小島 順彦, Kojima Yorihiko; born 15 October 1941), AC is the chairman of the board of Mitsubishi Corporation, and its former president and chief executive officer (CEO).

Kojima was born in Tokyo during World War II, the son of Kazuo and Sakae Kojima. He graduated from Tokyo Metropolitan Hibiya High School. In 1965, he received his bachelor's degree from the University of Tokyo in mechanical engineering. He joined the Mitsusbishi Corporation that same year and continued with them his entire career. Kojima held various positions in the corporation in Tokyo, in Saudi Arabia and the United States. In 1995 he was appointed to Mitsubishi's Board of Directors as an inside director (取締役). In 2001, he went from being managing director of the corporation's merchant banking group to vice president; and in 2004 he moved up to president and CEO, when then president Mikio Sasaki replaced the out-going Minoru Makihara as chairman of the board. In 2010, Kojima himself left the position of president and CEO to become chairman of the board of directors.

He is a member of the Japan Association of Corporate Executives (Keizai Doyukai), and was vice-chairman of that organization in 2003, and a board member from 2003 to 2008.

== Sources ==
- Marquis Who's Who (corp.) (2007) "Yorihiko Kojima" Who's Who in the World - 2008 (25th Edition) Marquis Who's Who, New Providence, NJ
