= 2018 Australia Day Honours =

Australian honours list 2018

The 2018 Australia Day Honours are appointments to various orders and honours to recognise and reward good works by Australian citizens. The list was announced on 26 January 2018 by the Governor General of Australia, Sir Peter Cosgrove.

The Australia Day Honours are the first of the two major annual honours lists, the first announced to coincide with Australia Day (26 January), with the other being the Queen's Birthday Honours, which are announced on the second Monday in June.

== Order of Australia ==
Order of Australia civil ribbon

Order of Australia military ribbon

Summary:

=== Companion of the Order of Australia (AC) ===
==== General Division ====
- Lucette Aldous – For eminent service to the performing arts, particularly to ballet, as a principal artist at the national and international level, to dance education, and as a mentor and role model for young performers.
- Dr Gregory John Clark – For eminent service to science as a physicist, researcher and academic in the area of technological development and communications, to business as an innovator and enabler of emerging technologies, and to the promotion of philanthropy
- The late Betty Cuthbert, AM, MBE – For eminent service to athletics at the national and international level, particularly as a gold medallist at the Melbourne and Tokyo Olympic Games, and as a role model, fundraiser, and advocate for research into a cure for multiple sclerosis.
- Evonne Goolagong Cawley, AO, MBE – For eminent service to tennis as a player at the national and international level, as an ambassador, supporter and advocate for the health, education and wellbeing of young Indigenous people through participation in sport, and as a role model.
- Dr Mukesh Haikerwal, AO – For eminent service to medical governance, administration, and technology, and to medicine, through leadership roles with a range of organisations, to education and the not-for-profit sector, and to the community of western Melbourne.
- Professor Rhys Jones – For eminent service to mechanical and aerospace engineering, and to education as an academic, researcher and author, particularly in the area of aircraft structural mechanics, corrosion repair and airworthiness.
- Professor David William Kissane – For eminent service to psychiatry, particularly psycho-oncology and palliative medicine, as an educator, researcher, author and clinician, and through executive roles with a range of national and international professional medical bodies.
- Professor Janet Susan McCalman – For eminent service to education, particularly in the field of social history, as a leading academic, researcher and author, as a contributor to multi-disciplinary curriculum development, and through the promotion of history to the wider community.
- Professor Trevor McDougall – For eminent service to science, and to education, particularly in the area of ocean thermodynamics, as an academic, and researcher, to furthering the understanding of climate science, and as a mentor of young scientists.
- Emeritus Professor Lew Mander – For eminent service to science through pioneering contributions to organic chemistry in the field of plant growth hormones, to higher education as an academic, researcher and author, and to national and international scientific societies.
- Professor Jennifer L. Martin – For eminent service to science, and to scientific research, particularly in the field of biochemistry and protein crystallography applied to drug-resistant bacteria, as a role model, and as an advocate for gender equality in science.
- Professor Ezio Rizzardo – For eminent service to scientific technological research and development in the field of polymer chemistry, to its application in the biomedical, electronics and nanotechnology context, as an author, and through mentorship roles.
- Professor Jeffrey Victor Rosenfeld, AM, OBE – For eminent service to medicine, particularly to the discipline of neurosurgery, as an academic and clinician, to medical research and professional organisations, and to the health and welfare of current and former defence force members.
- Professor Nicholas Talley – For eminent service to medical research, and to education in the field of gastroenterology and epidemiology, as an academic, author and administrator at the national and international level, and to health and scientific associations.
- Professor Maree Rose Teesson – For eminent service to medicine, particularly to the prevention and treatment of substance use disorders, as a researcher and author, to innovative mental health policy development, to education, and as a role model for young researchers.
- Mr Roy Francis Thompson – For eminent service to the community through philanthropic support for a range of medical research, emergency rescue, educational, sporting and cultural organisations, and to the real estate and land development sector in Queensland.

=== Officer of the Order of Australia (AO) ===
==== General Division ====
- Emeritus Professor David John Ames – For distinguished service to psychiatry, particularly in the area of dementia and the mental health of older persons, as an academic, author and practitioner, and as an adviser to professional bodies.
- Dr Rosalie Pam Balkin – For distinguished service to maritime law through roles with a range of organisations, to the improvement of global shipping transport safety and standards, and to education as an academic and author.
- Professor Martin Gerhardt Banwell – For distinguished service to science education as an academic, author and researcher, particularly in the field of synthetic organic chemistry, to scientific institutes, and as a mentor of emerging scientists.
- Emeritus Professor Michael Newton Barber – For distinguished service to higher education administration, and in the field of mathematical physics, particularly statistical mechanics, as an academic and researcher, and through contributions to science policy reform.
- David Lawrence Bardas – For distinguished service to the retail fashion industry, to the Jewish community, and through philanthropic contributions to Indigenous, education, cultural, social welfare, visual arts, and to medical organisations.
- The Hon. Justice Victoria Jane Bennett – For distinguished service to the judiciary and to the law, to the improvement of the family law system and child protection, to legal education, and to improving access to justice for Indigenous families.
- The Hon. Justice Alan Michael Blow, OAM – For distinguished service to the judiciary and to the law, particularly as Chief Justice of the Supreme Court of Tasmania, to legal education and professional standards, and to the community.
- Dr Peggy Brown – For distinguished service to medical administration in the area of mental health through leadership roles at the state and national level, to the discipline of psychiatry, to education, and to health care standards.
- Anna Buduls – For distinguished service to the business and finance sectors through advisory roles, as a supporter of, and advocate for, policy development to reduce homelessness, and to the welfare and charity sectors.
- Graham William Burke – For distinguished service to film production, marketing, exhibition and distribution, to the broadcast media industry, to the leisure and recreation sector, and to the community.
- Professor Mark Cameron Burry – For distinguished service to spatial information architecture as an academic, researcher and author, and as an innovator in the application of digital manufacturing and construction methods.
- Noel Robert Campbell – For distinguished service to the primary industry sector, particularly to dairy producers, through executive roles with professional bodies, to the milk supply industry, and to the community of Victoria.
- Belinda Jane Clark – For distinguished service to cricket as a player, captain and administrator, through support for national and international professional councils, and as a role model for young sportswomen.
- Emeritus Professor Michael David Coper – For distinguished service to legal education, and to the law, as an academic, author and administrator, through advisory roles, and to safety standards in the transport industry.
- Professor David Richard Coventry – For distinguished service to primary industry, particularly to sustainable agricultural production, as an academic and researcher, and through the facilitation of training programs and scholarships in developing countries.
- Maurice Aldo Crotti – For distinguished service to business and the food manufacturing sector, to export marketing organisations and economic development programs in South Australia, and to the arts.
- Ian David Darling – For distinguished service to documentary film production, to the performing arts, education and community engagement, and to social welfare organisations through philanthropic endeavours.
- Professor Hugh Lucius Davies – For distinguished service to Australia-Papua New Guinea relations, particularly in the area of the geological sciences, and to education as an academic, author and researcher.
- Professor Creswell John Eastman, AM – For distinguished service to medicine, particularly to the discipline of pathology, through leadership roles, to medical education, and as a contributor to international public health projects.
- Elizabeth Margaret Ellis, AM – For distinguished service to netball as an elite player and coach, through support and advocacy for young women, as a contributor to the broadcast and print media industries, and to the community.
- Professor Caroline Frances Finch – For distinguished service to sports medicine, particularly in the area of injury prevention, as an educator, researcher and author, and to the promotion of improved health in athletes and those who exercise.
- John Stuart Gaden, AM – For distinguished service to the performing arts through seminal performances as a stage actor, as an artistic director and administrator, and as a role model for, and mentor of, aspiring actors.
- Professor Suzanne Marie Garland – For distinguished service to medicine in the field of clinical microbiology, particularly to infectious diseases in reproductive and neonatal health as a physician, administrator, researcher and author, and to professional medical organisations.
- Michelle Anne Garnaut – For distinguished service to Australia-China relations as a restaurateur and entrepreneur, to the promotion of Australian food, film and design, as a supporter of literary and cultural programs, and as a role model.
- Professor David Joshua Handelsman – For distinguished service to medicine, particularly to reproductive endocrinology and andrology, as a clinician, author and researcher, to the science of doping in sport, and to medical education.
- Joanna Hayter – For distinguished service to women in the areas of gender equality and individual rights through leadership and policy development roles, and to the promotion of global health, peace and security.
- Dr Paul John Hemming – For distinguished service to higher education administration, to medicine through contributions to a range of professional medical associations, and to the community of central Victoria, particularly as a general practitioner.
- Philip Arthur Hennessy – For distinguished service to the business and accountancy sectors, to financial governance and education, and through support for women's health care, disability support and children's charitable groups.
- Professor Anthony David Holmes – For distinguished service to medicine, particularly to reconstructive and craniofacial surgery, as a leader, clinician and educator, and to professional medical associations.
- Professor Jonathan Myer Kalman – For distinguished service to medicine, particularly to cardiac electrophysiology as a clinician and academic, and through roles with a range of national and international heart rhythm societies.
- Associate Professor Neville John King – For distinguished service to medicine and medical education, particularly in the field of cognitive and behaviour therapy, as an academic, researcher and author, and to professional associations.
- Ulrike Klein – For distinguished service to the performing and visual arts through philanthropic support for a range of cultural organisations, particularly to classical and chamber music, and to the skin-care manufacturing sector.
- Professor Marilyn Lee Lake – For distinguished service to higher education, particularly to the social sciences, as an academic, researcher and author, and through contributions to historical organisations.
- Emeritus Professor Russell Duncan Lansbury, AM – For distinguished service to industrial relations education as an academic, researcher and author, through contributions to international arbitration foundations, and as a mentor of young academics.
- Meg Heather Lees – For distinguished service to the Parliament of Australia and the people of South Australia, particularly through leading contributions to environmental legislation and the reformation of the taxation system.
- Brian Gerard Loughnane – For distinguished service to parliament and politics through contributions to public policy, and as Federal Director of the Liberal Party of Australia.
- Heather Pamela McKay, AM, MBE – For distinguished service to squash as an elite player and coach, as a pioneer on the professional circuit, and through support for young athletes.
- Noela Helen MacLeod – For distinguished service to the community through advisory support and executive leadership of national, state and rural women's programs and associations.
- Christopher Patrick Maher – For distinguished service to community and international public health through technical, operational, and management roles in the global eradication of poliomyelitis.
- Dr Roger Balfour Mee – For distinguished service to medicine as a cardiothoracic surgeon, through innovations in establishing new techniques in paediatric surgery, and as a leader and clinician.
- Andrew Gordon Michelmore – For distinguished service to the mining industry through leadership roles in establishing trade and investment links, and in resource sector standards of practice on environmental and safety issues.
- Professor Ronald Paul Mitchell – For distinguished service to ophthalmology as a clinician, particularly in the management of age-related macular degeneration, through research into public health and ophthalmic epidemiology, and as an educator.
- Emeritus Professor Ingrid Moses – For distinguished service to higher education through senior academic management positions in Australian universities, and to a range of community and church organisations.
- Chloe Munro – For distinguished service to public administration through leadership roles in the area of renewable energy, water and climate change process and reform, and to the performing arts.
- Janine Gail O'Brien – For distinguished service to community health as an advocate for, and supporter of, cancer sufferers and their families through comprehensive research and treatment programs.
- Dr Diana Elaine O'Halloran – For distinguished service to medicine in the field of general practice through policy development, health system reform and the establishment of new models of service and care.
- Gail Maria Pemberton – For distinguished service to the finance and banking industry, to business through a range of roles, as an advocate for technology, and as a mentor to women.
- John Eric Pierce – For distinguished service to public administration through senior roles in developing regulatory and policy initiatives and micro-economic and energy market reforms, and to the community.
- Dr Simon Blanchette Poole – For distinguished service to science in the field of photonics research and development, as an academic, and to the telecommunications industry through advisory roles and board memberships.
- Pamela Beryl Pryor – For distinguished service to occupational health and safety through leadership and advisory roles, particularly in developing standards for education frameworks.
- Larke Christine Riemer – For distinguished service to business and commerce through leadership in the finance and banking industry, and as an advocate for gender equality and diversity in the sector.
- Geoffrey Ronald Robertson, QC – For distinguished service to the law and the legal profession as an international human rights lawyer and advocate for global civil liberties, and to legal education as an academic and publisher.
- Ian Lyall Robertson – For distinguished service to the arts, particularly the Australian film industry through executive roles in the screen production sector, as a patron and benefactor, and to the law.
- Paul John Robertson, AM – For distinguished service to the community through ethical leadership and management of, and philanthropic contributions to, health, social enterprise, research, education and arts organisations.
- Peter Hammond Robson – For distinguished service to business through research and development in government advisory and leadership roles in the manufacturing and industrial relations sectors, and to engineering.
- Christine Anne Ronalds, AM – For distinguished service to the law and the legal profession particularly in supporting, mentoring and developing the careers of Indigenous lawyers and law students.
- The late Mr John Royston Siddons – For distinguished service to manufacturing, particularly to the mechanical and engineering sectors, as an advocate for sustainable solar technologies, to the Parliament of Australia, and to the people of Victoria.
- Dr David Andrew Sinclair – For distinguished service to medical research into the biology of ageing and lifespan extension, as a geneticist and academic, to biosecurity initiatives, and as an advocate for the study of science.
- Laureate Professor Scott William Sloan – For distinguished service to education, particularly in the field of geotechnical engineering, as an academic and researcher, to professional associations, and as a mentor of young engineers.
- Dr Helen Mary Somerville – For distinguished service to medicine, particularly developmental paediatrics, as a clinician, and through advocacy roles for the care and treatment of people with intellectual disabilities.
- Dr Helen Veronica Szoke – For distinguished service to social justice through roles with human rights, antidiscrimination and equal opportunity organisations, to health sector policy development, and to the disadvantaged.
- Professor John Douglas Turnidge – For distinguished service to medicine as an infectious disease physician and microbiologist, particularly to the advancement of health policy in the area of antimicrobial resistance, and to professional medical organisations.
- Michael Colin Turtur, OAM – For distinguished service to cycling, particularly through the development and promotion of world-class road cycling events, and to the community of South Australia.
- Professor Laurence James Walsh – For distinguished service to dentistry, and to dental science education, as an academic and author, to improved health and safety standards, and through roles with professional associations.
- Karrie Ann Webb, AM – For distinguished service to golf at the elite level as a player, to the development of female golfers, as a mentor and role model, and through charitable and community organisations.
- Jeffrey Whittle – For distinguished service to the information technology sector and the mining industry, particularly through the development of industry standard computer programs for strategic mine planning and optimisation.
- Geoffrey James Wilson – For distinguished service to the business and finance sectors, particularly in the field of asset management and investment, to professional financial bodies, and to the community as a supporter of charitable foundations.

==== Military Division ====
- Vice Admiral David Johnston, AM, RAN – For distinguished service to the Australian Defence Force in senior command and staff appointments.
- Major General Richard Burr, DSC, AM, MVO – For distinguished service in the implementation of significant reform and the realisation of strategic capabilities within the Australian Defence Force.
- Major General Ian Denis Westwood, AM – For distinguished service to the Australian Defence Force as Chief Military Judge of the Australian Military Court and Chief Judge Advocate of the superior disciplinary tribunal system.

=== Member of the Order of Australia (AM) ===
==== General Division ====
- George Barclay Allingame – For significant service to the building and construction industry in Western Australia, to occupational safety and health standards, and to professional associations.
- The late Mr Hugh McDonald Anderson – For significant service to Australian folklore as an historian and author, and to the community of Victoria through historical societies.
- Mark John Anderson – For significant service to secondary education in New South Wales through administrative and executive roles, and to educational standards.
- Richard Henry Anicich – For significant service to the community of the Hunter, to business development and medical research, and to the law.
- Gary Ian Baker – For significant service to the energy generation and supply market in Tasmania, to health and aged care organisations, and to the community.
- Robert Arthur Baker, OAM – For significant service to youth, particularly through leadership roles with Scouts, and to the sport of karting as an administrator and mentor.
- Peter Rodney Barker – For significant service to Australia-China relations, particularly through language interpretation roles.
- Catherine Mary Baxter – For significant service to education administration in rural New South Wales, to training programs for Indigenous students, and to the community.
- Hon. William Robert Baxter – For significant service to the people and Parliament of Victoria.
- Dr Robin Anthony Bedding – For significant service to science in the field of entomology as a researcher, and to the forestry industry both nationally and internationally.
- Dr Michael Charles Bellemore – For significant service to medicine in the field of paediatric orthopaedics as a surgeon, to medical education, and to professional medical societies.
- Sandra Joyce Berenger – For significant service to nursing in the field of infection prevention and control, as a clinician and consultant, and to medical associations.
- David John Bevan – For significant service to public administration in Queensland through oversight, accountability and administrative justice roles, and to the law.
- Catherine Ann Biddick – For significant service to the community through philanthropic, governance, administrative and fundraising support for health and medical research.
- Garth Owen Blake – For significant service to the Anglican Church of Australia, particularly to child protection policy and professional standards, and to the law.
- Professor Fiona Mary Blyth – For significant service to medical research and education in the field of public health, pain management and ageing, and to health policy reform.
- Right Worshipful Rev. Gordon Alfred Bradbery, OAM – For significant service to local government, to the community of the Illawarra, to the mining industry, and to the Uniting Church in Australia.
- Lynne Patricia Bradshaw – For significant service to animal welfare at the state and national level, to live export and farm management standards, and to business.
- Professor George Braitberg – For significant service to medical administration and emergency medicine, to education and health system design, and to the community.
- Dr David Francis Branagan – For significant service to the geological sciences as an academic, researcher and author, to professional groups, and to the community.
- Professor Stephen William Burdon – For significant service to information technology and telecommunications, to education, to the visual arts, and to Australia-Asia cultural relations.
- Emeritus Professor Shelley Mary Burgin – For significant service to environmental science and education as an academic, author, and mentor, and to zoology and conservation.
- Dr Charles Rodney Campbell – For significant service to education, particularly to literacy, as a practitioner, academic and author.
- Neville John Carter – For significant service to legal education through executive roles, to the law as a practitioner, and to professional standards.
- Adjunct Professor Charlotte Francis Champion De Crespigny – For significant service to nursing, and to nurse education, particularly in the field of drug and alcohol care, and to Indigenous health projects.
- Arthur Pendrill Charles – For significant service to the primary industry sector through roles with agricultural societies, as a children's author, and to the community.
- Dr Colin Ross Chilvers – For significant service to medicine in the field of anaesthesia as a clinician, to medical education in Tasmania, and to professional societies.
- Geoffrey Arnold Churack – For significant service to the community through philanthropic support for medical research, education and sporting groups, and to the retail automotive sector.
- Vicki Clitheroe – For significant service to the community, particularly to the visual arts, through support for emerging artists, cultural organisations and youth.
- Edwin Thomas Codd – For significant service to architecture, industrial design and to the built environment, to education, and to professional institutes.
- Emeritus Professor Denis Ivan Crane – For significant service to education in the field of biochemistry and molecular biology, as an academic and researcher, and to scientific bodies.
- Maya Alexa Cranitch – For significant service to education, to teaching English as a second language, through educational programs for refugees, and to social justice.
- Colin Creighton – For significant service to environmental science and natural resource management, particularly to marine biodiversity, coastal ecology, fisheries and sustainable agriculture.
- Harold Geoffrey Davis – For significant service to the fire protection and security industry, to technology development, as an engineer, and to defence industry capability.
- Mary Therese Draper – For significant service to community health as a consumer advocate through contributions to delivery standards and governance, and to stakeholder engagement.
- Dr Johannes Hendrik Drielsma – For significant service to the commercial forestry industry, to sustainable management practices and certification programs, and to professional bodies.
- Adjunct Professor Ian Maxwell Dunn – For significant service to the law, to legal standards, education, and specialist accreditation, and as a practitioner in the areas of negotiation and dispute resolution.
- Christopher Robin Eckermann – For significant service to the telecommunications industry through roles in broadband infrastructure and network development, and to the energy supply sector.
- The Hon Richard Francis Edmonds – For significant service to the judiciary, particularly through the Federal Court of Australia, to revenue and taxation law, and to the legal profession.
- Patricia Ann Elliott – For significant service to education in the Northern Territory, particularly to children in remote areas, and to the community of Katherine.
- Professor Susan Leigh Elliott – For significant service to education as an academic administrator, as a clinician in the field of gastroenterology, and to educational institutions in the Asia-Pacific.
- David Nathan Flanagan – For significant service to the mining sector through a range of roles, to higher education, to philanthropy, and to the community.
- Gregory Robert Fletcher – For significant service to the protection and security of Australian personnel and management of facilities at the Australian Embassy in Baghdad, Iraq.
- Angelos Marcelo Frangopoulos – For significant service to the broadcast media sector, to higher education and the promotion of journalistic standards, and to the community.
- Dr Gillian Margaret Gale – For significant service to children who are blind or have low vision as an educator, and to learning support and education integration programs.
- Kerry Lee Gardner – For significant service to the community through support for a range of cultural, social justice and environmental conservation organisations.
- Jason J Garrett – For significant service to fly fishing through representational and business roles, to the tourism sector in Tasmania, and to professional associations.
- Peter John Gill – For significant service to aged welfare, to the provision of pioneering palliative care programs, to medical education, and to the community.
- Karen Michelle Glaetzer – For significant service to nursing, particularly in the field of palliative care, to people living with Motor Neurone Disease, and to professional groups.
- Colleen Mary Godsell – For significant service to youth through Scouting, and through roles with educational, historical preservation, Indigenous tourism and social welfare groups.
- Peter Gordon – For significant service to the community through support for Australian rules football, health promotion and youth social welfare, and to the law.
- Shane Elizabeth Gould, MBE – For significant service to swimming at the elite level, as a gold medallist at the Munich Olympic Games, and to water safety programs in developing countries.
- Emeritus Professor John Charles Grant-Thomson RFD – For significant service to biomedical engineering, and to education, as an academic and researcher, to medical equipment design, and as a mentor.
- William Wyatt Guest – For significant service to community health, particularly to people living with cancer, through fundraising support for charitable organisations, and to sport.
- Michael Anthony Gurry – For significant service to charitable organisations through fundraising and cooperative networking roles, and to social welfare programs in Cambodia.
- Associate Professor Peter Haertsch OAM – For significant service to medicine in the field of plastic and reconstructive surgery as a clinician and administrator, and to medical education.
- Gregory John Hallam PSM – For significant service to local government administration, to natural disaster recovery efforts, and to people with disabilities.
- Professor Ian Godfrey Hammond – For significant service to medicine in the field of gynaecological oncology as a clinician, to cancer support and palliative care, and to professional groups.
- Associate Professor Nerina Susan Harley – For significant service to medicine in the fields of intensive care and nephrology, as an administrator, and to medical research and education.
- Dr Mary Gale Harris – For significant service to community health, specifically to workforce management and administration, to policy reform, and to medical education.
- Rechelle Margaret Hawkes OAM – For significant service to hockey, particularly as national captain of multiple tournament-winning teams, and as a role model and commentator.
- Professor Donald James Henry – For significant service to wildlife preservation and to the environment through leadership and advocacy roles, and to education.
- Jon Meredith Hickman – For significant service to the community, particularly to education, heritage preservation, infrastructure and financial planning, and to public administration.
- Professor Patricia Elizabeth Hoffie – For significant service to the visual arts, and to education, as an academic, and as a contributor to a range of cultural institutions and associations.
- David Leslie Holst – For significant service to people with a disability through executive and advocacy roles, as a fundraiser, and to the automotive sector.
- Dr Philip Haywood House – For significant service to medicine as an ophthalmologist, to eye surgery foundations, and to the international community of Timor Leste.
- Eric William Howard – For significant service to road transport safety through consultancy roles, to professional bodies, and to the community.
- Peter Valentine Howard – For significant service to the food and wine tourism sectors as a commentator, television presenter and author, and to culinary foundations.
- Dorothy May Isaksen – For significant service to the Parliament of New South Wales, as an advocate for gender equality in politics, as a mentor, and to the community.
- Vicki Ann Jellie – For significant service to community health in rural Victoria through the provision of access to radiotherapy treatments for people with cancer.
- John Load Jones – For significant service to the mining exploration sector through a range of roles, to the livestock transport industry, and to the community.
- Peter Campbell Jones – For significant service to the tourism and hospitality sectors, particularly through event management, as an advisor, and to the community.
- Dr Robin Glyn Jones – For significant service to the community through support for refugees, as a contributor to social welfare assistance organisations, and to education.
- Dr Peshotan Homi Katrak – For significant service to rehabilitation medicine as a practitioner, to medical education and professional organisations, and to the Zoroastrian community.
- Adjunct Professor John William Kelly – For significant service to medicine through the management and treatment of melanoma, as a clinician and administrator, and to education.
- Leonard Victor Kempler OAM – For significant service to the community through contributions to national cultural institutions, charitable, education and children's medical foundations.
- Chester Stewart Keon-Cohen – For significant service to the law, and to the judiciary, in Victoria, and as a supporter of a range of health and community organisations.
- John Joseph Kinsella – For significant service to the international community through healthcare and educational programs for vulnerable children in Cambodia.
- The Late Mr Hartmut Krtschil – For significant service to biosecurity and quarantine systems, to compliance development, and to the freight transport industry.
- Professor Sharad Kumar – For significant service to medical research in the field of cancer and cell biology, as a scientist and author, to medical education, and as a mentor.
- Emeritus Professor Noeline June Kyle – For significant service to history, and to higher education, as a researcher, author and educator, and through advisory roles for arts funding programs.
- Dr Philip William Ladds – For significant service to veterinary science as a clinician, to education as an academic, researcher and author, and to professional associations.
- Dr Danny Lamm – For significant service to the Jewish community through roles with multicultural, religious, youth and social welfare groups, and to Australia-Israel relations.
- Jennifer Suzanne Lang – For significant service to the higher education sector, particularly to international student recruitment, and to export market growth.
- Robert John Last – For significant service to children who are deaf, deafblind, or have low vision, and their families, particularly to those with CHARGE syndrome.
- Dr Ross Kenneth Littlewood – For significant service to medicine as an ophthalmologist, to professional medical organisations, and to the international community of Timor Leste.
- Karen Doreen Loblay – For significant service to youth through charitable contributions and support for social welfare programs, and as a supporter of Indigenous students.
- Roxanne Sue McMurray – For significant service to community health as a leader and advocate of support programs and crisis centres for women.
- Associate Professor Peter Laurence McNicol – For significant service to medicine, particularly in the fields of anaesthesiology, liver transplantation, and transfusion medicine.
- Serafino Maglieri – For significant service to the Italian community of South Australia, to a range of charitable and tourism activities, and as a winemaker.
- Leah Mann – For significant service to community welfare and youth organisations, to library services and programs, and to public administration.
- Kenneth Nicholas Marchingo – For significant service to the community through social welfare programs and associations, particularly assistance for the homeless.
- Associate Professor Henrietta Lilian Marrie – For significant service to the community as an advocate for Indigenous cultural heritage and intellectual property rights, and to education.
- Dr John Williams Meagher – For significant service to agriculture, particularly to the wheat and potato industries as a consultant, researcher and administrator, and to the community
- Walter Andrej Mikac – For significant service to the community as an advocate for gun control, and to the protection of children through social welfare programs.
- Michael Keith Morcombe – For significant service to conservation and the environment in the fields of natural history and ornithology as a photographer, illustrator, and author.
- Gary William Morgan AFSM – For significant service to the community through emergency response organisations, and to forest and fire research and management.
- Russell Norman Morris – For significant service to the performing arts as a musician, singer, songwriter and entertainer, and as a supporter of charitable organisations.
- Dr Wilfred Alan Morrison – For significant service to the community through development and support for international standards, to the energy supply sector, and to engineering.
- Nicole Peta Muir – For significant service to the performing arts as an administrator, and to women and young girls, particularly in rural and remote regions.
- Richard James Muirhead – For significant service to public administration in Western Australia through infrastructure reform, tourism development and trade strategy.
- Andrew Vallejo Myer – For significant service to the community through support for a range of cultural and environmental conservation organisations, and to the film industry.
- John Collinson Myers – For significant service to the community through health, business education, youth, music and charitable organisations.
- The Hon. Professor Howard Tomaz Nathan QC – For significant service to the law and to the judiciary through the Supreme Court of Victoria, and to a range of cultural, arts and education institutions.
- Warwick Arthur Norman – For significant service to the maritime transport industry, particularly through the development of environmental risk management systems.
- Professor Frank Oberklaid OAM – For significant service to medicine in the field of clinical paediatrics, child development, and public health policy, as a researcher and academic.
- Dr John James O'Donnell – For significant service to health administration through the leadership and development of research institutes and public and private hospitals.
- Susan O'Neill OAM – For significant service to swimming at the elite level, as a mentor and role model, and to the community through support for charitable organisations.
- Hayden David Opie – For significant service to education as an academic specialising in sports law, and through roles with integrity, anti-doping and appeals tribunals.
- Commander Philip Leslie Orchard RAN (Retd) – For significant service to veterans and their families in Western Australia through administrative roles.
- Victor Joe Paino – For significant service to the seafood retailing industry, to ship supply services, and to the community through support for charitable groups.
- Dr Vanita Rajul Parekh – For significant service to medicine as a specialist in the fields of sexual health and forensic medicine, as an educator and clinician, and to professional associations.
- John Wilson Payne – For significant service to art conservation and restoration as a leading practitioner, scholar, teacher and mentor.
- The Hon. Edward Phillip Pickering – For significant service to the Parliament of New South Wales, and to the community.
- Dr Peter Creighton Piggott – For significant service to medicine in the prevention and treatment of HIV and tuberculosis as a clinician, researcher and mentor.
- Noel Edgar Playford OAM – For significant service to local government in Queensland, particularly in the areas of governance and financial administration, and to the community.
- Andrew John Plympton – For significant service to sports administration through governance roles, particularly to sailing and Australian rules football.
- Simon Paul Poidevin OAM – For significant service to education through fundraising and student scholarship support, to the community through the not-for-profit sector, and to rugby union.
- Associate Professor Morton Christopher Rawlin – For significant service to the medical profession particularly through governance in the areas of general practice and medical education.
- John Stuart Ridley – For significant service to the community of Melbourne in a range of honorary and professional roles in community development and arts organisations.
- The late Mrs Gillian Rolton OAM – For significant service to horse sports through roles with a range of national and international equestrian organisations.
- Professor Margaret Anne Rose – For significant service to animal welfare and the ethics of scientific research, and to veterinary science as an academic and clinician.
- Dr Jennifer Claire Rosevear – For significant service to music education in South Australia, particularly through curriculum development at the tertiary and secondary levels.
- Christopher Leslie Russell – For significant service to agricultural science and technology through advisory, developmental and research roles, and as a mentor and innovator.
- Denis James Ryan – For significant service to the community of Victoria through a range of roles, particularly in the area of child protection investigations, and to local government.
- The Hon. John Francis Ryan – For significant service to the Parliament of New South Wales, and to public administration, particularly the development of accommodation policy for people with a disability.
- Peter Francis Ryan – For significant service to the community through the economic and social development of the Goulburn Valley.
- Serafina Salucci – For significant service to community health, particularly as an advocate for people with asbestos related diseases.
- Anant Kaur Sandhu – For significant service to the restaurant and catering industry in South Australia, and to the community through support for charitable organisations.
- Professor Norman Ruthven Saunders – For significant service to medicine in the field of neuroscience through research into spinal cord injuries and mechanisms protecting the developing brain, and to sailing.
- Quinto Sclazo – For significant service to the food retailing industry, and to the community through support for a range of charitable organisations.
- John Michael Schaffer – For significant service to the community through philanthropic contributions and governance roles with a range of health and cultural foundations.
- Ernest John Schmatt PSM – For significant service to the law in the field of legal education and review, and through the use of technology to assist the judiciary.
- Russell Miles Scott – For significant service to chemical engineering through leading roles in developing and improving professional education.
- Michael Andrew Shobbrook – For significant service to the chiropractic profession through leadership in education, accreditation and development programs.
- David John Singleton – For significant service to engineering, particularly through creating sustainable infrastructure for cities and communities.
- Dr Marcus Welby Skinner – For significant service to medicine in the field of anaesthesiology and perioperative medicine as a clinician, and to professional societies.
- Dr Judith Marion Slocombe – For significant service to the community through child protection programs, and to veterinarian science as a clinician, innovator and mentor.
- The Hon. Thomas Harrison Smith QC – For significant service to the law and to the judiciary in Victoria, to the administration of justice, independent court governance and legal reform, and to education.
- Jozefa Bronislawa Sobski – For significant service to women's rights and migrant advocacy, and to higher education and skills based training.
- Barbara Rosalie Spalding – For significant service to public administration in Victoria, and to the community, particularly in the areas of welfare and education.
- Brian James Spencer – For significant service to the community through the St Vincent de Paul Society in South Australia, and to business.
- Tracey Leigh Spicer – For significant service to the broadcast media as a journalist and television presenter, and as an ambassador for social welfare and charitable groups.
- Dr Michael Philip Stanford – For significant service to the health sector through executive roles, to tertiary education, and to the community of Western Australia.
- Captain John Philip Stevenson RAN (Retd) – For significant service to naval veterans through a range of roles.
- Mark Randall Stirling – For significant service to international relations through humanitarian and emergency response programs in developing countries.
- Annette Mureeka Stokes – For significant service to Indigenous health, to medical research, and to the communities of the Goldfields in Western Australia.
- Dr Reginald Raymond Storrier – For significant service to agriculture specialising in soil science, to education as an academic and administrator, and to the Catholic Church in Australia.
- Associate Professor Jennifer Susan Thomson – For significant service to medicine as a general practitioner, to medical education, to professional organisations, and to the community.
- Michele Margaret Timms – For significant service to basketball as a competitor at the national and international level, as an Olympic athlete, and as a mentor for women in sport.
- Emeritus Professor Grant Clement Townsend – For significant service to dentistry in the field of craniofacial biology, and to dental education through research, teaching and mentoring roles.
- Noel Henry Tresider – For significant service to workplace health in the field of occupational hygiene, and to the promotion and development of standards and training.
- Kelvin Geoffrey Trimper – For significant service to horticulture and the promotion of gardening, to urban development, and to the community of Salisbury.
- Darriea Jean Turley – For significant service to the community of Broken Hill, particularly in the health, social welfare and education sectors, and to women in local government.
- Dr Cecil Hugh Tyndale-Biscoe – For significant service to science in the field of marsupial reproductive biology and ecology, as a researcher and mentor, and to professional societies.
- Professor Mark Peter Umstad – For significant service to medicine in the field of obstetrics, particularly complex pregnancies, as a clinician, consultant and academic.
- Roger John Underwood – For significant service to the community of Western Australia through forestry and bushfire management, and as an historian and writer.
- Professor Robert Vink – For significant service to medicine, particularly in the field of neurotrauma, as a researcher, author, educator and advocate, and to the community.
- Dr Elsina Margaret Wainwright – For significant service to international affairs, through Australian defence, foreign policy and conflict prevention studies, as an analyst and academic.
- Mark Anthony Watt – For significant service to the community, particularly to disadvantaged and at-risk youth, through social welfare support organisations.
- Trevor Francis Weatherhead – For significant service to the beekeeping industry as an apiarist, to developing biosecurity policy, and to professional beekeeping associations.
- Professor Anthony Steven Weiss – For significant service to science in the field of biotechnology, as an academic, researcher, author and mentor, and through executive roles with scientific institutions.
- Gregory Byrne Whitby – For significant service to education in the Catholic school system as a leader, administrator, advocate and teacher.
- Vivienne Mary White – For significant service to education through leadership in the development of initiatives that support disadvantaged students and schools.
- Lawrence Leslie Wilson – For significant service to the community through philanthropic support, particularly for medical research organisations and art scholarship funds.
- Anthony Richard Wood – For significant service to conservation and the environment, particularly in the areas of energy policy, climate change, and sustainability.
- Professor David George Wood – For significant service to chemical engineering education as a researcher, mentor and academic, and to professional organisations.
- Professor Barbara S Workman – For significant service to geriatric and rehabilitation medicine, as a clinician and academic, and to the provision of aged care services.
- Professor Richard Keith Wortley – For significant service to criminology and psychology through the development of security and crime science education.
- Ronald Warren Woss – For significant service to youth, particularly to support for research into suicide prevention, and to the community through a range of charitable organisations.
- Dr Dennis Charles Young – For significant service to community health in Queensland through alcohol and drug treatment support programs, and to the community.

==== Military Division ====
- Commodore Mark David Hammond, RAN – For exceptional service to the Australian Defence Force in senior command and staff roles.
- Commodore Michele Halina Millar, RAN – For exceptional performance of duty in command and the development of Navy people.
- Brigadier Mark Andrew Brewer, CSC & Bar – For exceptional service as the Director General Training – Forces Command, and Commandant of the Royal Military College of Australia.
- Brigadier John Joseph Mackenzie – For exceptional performance of duty in the role of Chief of Joint Plans within Headquarters Combined Joint Task Force – Operation INHERENT RESOLVE.
- Colonel Douglas William Mallett – For exceptional service in the field of capability development for the Australian Defence Force.
- Brigadier Simon Paul Welsh – For exceptional service in the development, acquisition and through life support of critical soldier systems capabilities for Australian Defence Force personnel.
- Group Captain Robert James Denney – For exceptional service in air combat capability development and sustainment for the Royal Australian Air Force.
- Air Commodore James Dennis Hood, OAM – For exceptional service in major capability acquisition and sustainment, aviation regulatory reform, and aircraft and aviation safety engineering for the Australian Defence Force.
- Air Commodore Richard Laurence Lennon, CSC – For exceptional performance of duty in air lift capability development, strategic guidance, air mobility management and cultural reform for the Australian Defence Force.
- Air Commodore Michael Charles Paterson, DSM – For exceptional performance of duty in military health capability and development for the Australian Defence Force.
- Group Captain Daniel Edward Reid – For exceptional service in combat aircraft logistics sustainment and governance.

==== Honorary Division ====
- Dr Caroline Bowen – For significant service to speech pathology and clinical linguistics as a therapist, academic, educator and mentor.
- Mary Stella Jerram – For significant service to the law in New South Wales as State Coroner, and as a role model for women in the legal profession.
- Paula Latos-Valier – For significant service to the visual arts through a range of roles, and to Australia-United States of America relations through academic exchange.
- Dr Sakuko Matsui – For significant service to education in the field of Japanese language, culture and literature, and through promoting Japan-Australia relations.

=== Medal of the Order of Australia (OAM) ===
==== General Division ====
- Alex Mark Abulafia – For service to the Jewish community, and to business.
- Professor William Robert Adam PSM – For service to medical education, particularly to rural health.
- Deirdre Margaret Ades – For service to netball.
- Norman Warren Allan – For service to education.
- Lionel Dean Allemand – For service to the community, and to local government.
- Diana Ruth Allen – For service to jazz music.
- Roger James Allen – For service to cricket.
- Susan Elizabeth Alt – For service to the community through voluntary roles.
- Gerald John Andersen – For service to social welfare organisations, and to the food manufacturing industry.
- Wendy Joy Andrews – For service to the community.
- Roy Arnold – For service to people with a disability.
- Associate Professor Christopher Roger Ashton – For service to medicine, and to medical education.
- David John Astbury – For service to local government, and to the community of Wickepin.
- Sandra Adrienne Atkins – For service to equestrian sports.
- Warren James Atkins – For service to mathematics education.
- Margaret Raemon Atkinson – For service to Irish dancing.
- Roland Auguszczak – For service to the performing arts, and to choral music.
- Associate Professor Anthony Paul Avsec – For service to the building and construction industry, and to education.
- Lt Col Philip Gavan Badcock (Retd) – For service to veterans and their families.
- Thomas John Bagnat PSM – For service to public administration in New South Wales.
- Carol Joyce Baiton – For service to netball.
- Simon Francis Baker – For service to athletics, particularly to racewalking.
- Paul Robert Bangay – For service to landscape architecture.
- Adjunct Professor Agnes Bankier – For service to medicine as a geneticist, and to medical education.
- Muriel Helen Barasso – For service to the real estate industry.
- Neville Kenneth Barnier – For service to people with a disability, and to the community of Penrith.
- John Thomas Baron – For service to veterans and their families.
- Dr Raymond George Barrett – For service to education.
- Margaret Francis Barry – For service to social welfare organisations assisting children in Bali.
- Dr Neil John Bartels – For service to medicine in rural and regional areas.
- George Bartolo – For service to the Maltese and multicultural communities of New South Wales.
- Hatice Hurmuz Basarin – For service to the preservation of Australian and Turkish military history.
- John Gerard Bateman – For service to local government, and to the community of Nepean.
- Robert Gordon Bath – For service to the community of Ballarat.
- Vernon Clive Bechaz – For service to veterans and their families.
- Kevin Frank Best – For service to football in New South Wales.
- Margaret Josephine Bird – For service to the aged, and to the community of Tasmania.
- Terrence Ian Black – For service to veterans and their families.
- Lloyd William Blake – For service to the preservation of maritime history.
- The Rev Paul Thomas Bland – For service to education, and to the Anglican Church of Australia.
- Kenneth William Bock – For service to the community.
- Gregory Melwyn Boland – For service to the community.
- Phyllis Lorna Bowen – For service to the community of Brisbane.
- Margaret Ann Bradford-Seeley – For service to community health in Western Australia.
- Ann Rosalie Bray – For service to the community of north east Melbourne.
- Associate Professor Robert John Breen – For service to the Indigenous community, and to military history.
- Mary Josephine Brell – For service to the community.
- Dr Leonard Brenner – For service to medicine as a general practitioner.
- Donald Leslie Briggs – For service to the community of Shellharbour, and to local government.
- Mathijs Christiaan Broeren – For service to business, particularly to photography.
- Dorothea Lavina Brown – For service to youth through Guiding.
- Suzanne Virginia Brown – For service to the community through fundraising roles.
- Mary Iona Browner – For service to the community through social welfare organisations.
- Neville James Browning – For service to the preservation of military history.
- Ronald James Buchan – For service to the community of Thirroul.
- Francesco Bueti – For service to children with cancer through fundraising roles.
- Mark Andrew Burdajewicz – For service to the Polish community.
- Ronald Arthur Burgess – For service to basketball.
- Sheryl Ann Burnie – For service to softball in Tasmania.
- Catherine Anne Butler – For service to refugees, and to community health.
- Elaine Margaret Callick – For service to youth through Guiding.
- Janet Morrison Cameron – For service to the broadcast media.
- Colin Bruce Campbell – For service to the winemaking industry.
- Graeme John Campbell – For service to harness racing.
- Beryle Frances Campbell Foster – For service to women in Victoria.
- Rosalind Carlson – For service to choral music, and to education.
- Nicholas Owen Carmody – For service to local government, and to the community of Yass.
- Keith James Carrick – For service to the livestock industry.
- The Hon. Giovanni Mario Castrilli – For service to the people and Parliament of Western Australia.
- Denise Anne Cauchi – For service to the multicultural community, and to human rights.
- Irene Cayas – For service to the multicultural community, to women, and to the aged.
- Anita Patricia Chalmers – For service to community health.
- The late Dr Harold Clive Champion – For service to dental education.
- Daniel Yuen-Lee Chan – For service to the Chinese community of Tasmania.
- Dr Joseph Weiyin Chan – For service to the Chinese community of Western Sydney.
- Brian John Chaplin – For service to Australian rules football.
- Glenys Elizabeth Chapman – For service to nursing, and to international outreach programs.
- Major Robert Gordon Charles RFD (Retd) – For service to the community through a range of roles.
- Dr Raymond Watsford Chaseling – For service to medicine, particularly to paediatrics.
- Johannes Chitty – For service to parachuting.
- Richard John Chugg APM – For service to the community through a range of organisations.
- Bernard Chatfield Clark – For service to naval and general marine ship design and engineering.
- Vicki Joan Clark – For service to the Indigenous community of Victoria.
- The Rev Dr David Claydon – For service to the Anglican Church of Australia, to inter-faith relations, and to refugees.
- Carmel Monica Clemson – For service to the community of the Macedon Ranges.
- Dr Richard Arthur Cockington – For service to medicine as a paediatrician.
- Keith Codrington – For service to the community of St George.
- His Honour Judge Peter Raymond Cole – For service to the judiciary, and to family law.
- Susan Jane Cole – For service to family law, and to the community.
- John Collins – For service to the community of Manning, and to local government.
- Patricia Elizabeth Collins – For service to the community through the preservation of historical sites.
- Kevin Joseph Coorey – For service to the community through a range of roles.
- David Robin Cossart – For service to youth through Scouts.
- Lt Col Peter Kennedy Court RFD, ED (Retd) – For service to sport, and to the community.
- Richard Geoffrey Cranna – For service to war widows and their families.
- Peter William Crombie – For service to athletics.
- Dr Marjorie Winifred Cross – For service to medicine, particularly to doctors in rural areas.
- Don Joseph Cullen – For service to the community through a range of roles.
- Peter Roy Cummiskey – For service to sports administration, and to Australian rules football.
- John Stuart Dahlenburg – For service to conservation and the environment, and to the community.
- Patrick Daley – For service to community health, and to local government.
- Anthony James Daniel – For service to emergency response organisations.
- Walter George Davidson – For service to aged care.
- Associate Professor Mark Andrew Davies – For service to medicine, particularly to neurosurgery.
- Pedr Llewellyn Davis – For service to journalism, and to the automotive industry.
- Margaret May Dawson – For service to the community of Busselton.
- Paul Beaumont de Launay – For service to engineering, particularly in disaster relief situations.
- Dr Carlos de Lemos – For service to the Portuguese community of Victoria.
- Theodorus Gerardus Dechaufepie – For service to veterans and their families.
- Barbara Mary Deed – For service to the community of South Australia.
- Karen Joan Deephouse – For service to surf life saving.
- Leslie Samuel Dell – For service to business, to education, and to the community.
- Robert Lee Denner – For service to the community of Dorrigo, and to veterans.
- The late Dr Michelle Sue Dewar – For service to the community of the Northern Territory.
- Terene Eva Donovan – For service to archery.
- Allan Alfred Downs – For service to the community.
- Dr Roslyn Frances Dunbar-Wells – For service to the performing arts.
- Ross Winston Dunkerton – For service to motorsports, particularly as a rally car driver.
- Lynette Mary Dunoon – For service to community health.
- Dr Sharyn Beryl Eaton – For service to chiropractic medicine, and to education.
- Irene Ann Edwards – For service to the community of Wynnum Manly.
- Margaret Anne Egan – For service to the community of the Tweed.
- Ian Kenneth Ellis APM – For service to youth, and to the community.
- Jennifer Joi Ellis – For service to community health as a midwife.
- Glenn Elston – For service to the performing arts.
- Stephen Marsden Emerson – For service to veterans and their families.
- Walter John Ferrell – For service to community history in Western Australia.
- Albert Edward Fish – For service to veterans and their families.
- Peter John Fisher – For service to the community of the Northern Territory.
- Elisabeth Margaret Fleming – For service to the community through social welfare organisations.
- Kay Dorothy Fordham – For service to community health.
- Mandy Caroline Forteath – For service to people with breast cancer.
- Dr Ian Stuart Fraser – For service to medicine and to community health.
- Ian Thomas Fraser – For service to conservation and the environment.
- Peter Francis Frawley – For service to cricket, and to the community.
- Maurice Desmond Fuller – For service to the community of Kempsey-Macleay, and to motor sports.
- David Bruce Gay – For service to business, and to environmental pest management.
- Rabbi Ralph Robin Genende – For service to multi-faith relations, and to the Jewish community of Victoria.
- Norman Leslie Ginn – For service to the community of Victor Harbor.
- Ian Wesley Glanville – For service to the print and broadcast media, and to the community of Bendigo.
- Neville Kenneth Glover – For service to rugby league, and to the community.
- Francis Patrick Golding – For service to child welfare and social justice, and to the community.
- Roberta Goot – For service to music education.
- Angus Donald Gordon – For service to environmental management and planning, and to the community.
- Graham Edward Goulding – For service to community history and heritage preservation.
- Peter John Graham – For service to the community through marine rescue organisations.
- Dr David William Green – For service to emergency medicine, and to professional organisations.
- Michael Charles Green – For service to the Indigenous community.
- Alpha Louise Gregory – For service to music in the Australian Capital Territory.
- Rozlynn Ann Grey – For service to lifesaving, and to swimming
- Julie Bronwyn Griffin – For service to women, and to the community.
- The Hon. Nicholas David Griffiths – For service to the people and Parliament of Western Australia.
- Helen May Guthrie – For service to the community of Port Macquarie.
- Heather Anne Gwilliam – For service to the community through a range of organisations.
- Mihail Halkitis – For service to the building and construction industry, and to the community.
- Jean Lynette Hamilton – For service to the community of Longwood.
- Thomas Bruce Hancock – For service to athletics.
- Geoffrey Stewart Hannah – For service to the visual arts through the production of furniture and marquetry.
- Adrian Gordon Hanrahan – For service to local government, and to the communities of Coonamble and Young.
- Lynette Eva Harris – For service to women in Victoria.
- The Reverend Father Edward Joseph Harte – For service to the Catholic Church in Australia, and to the community.
- Faye Haskin-Dubrown – For service to inter-faith relations, and to the community.
- Sherene Abdallah Hassan – For service to the community through the promotion of cross-cultural understanding.
- Josephine Wendy Hawkes – For service to the community through music.
- Richard Lentell Head ESM – For service to alpine emergency search and rescue organisations.
- David John Helman – For service to veterans and their families.
- Peter Humfry Henchman – For service to conservation and the environment.
- Jon Malcolm Henricks – For service to swimming at the elite level, and as a mentor.
- Richard John Henwood – For service to the cattle breeding industry.
- Kazimierz Herbst – For service to natural wildlife conservation in South Australia.
- Philip John Heuzenroeder – For service to community health through music and arts programs.
- Dr Barry Peter Hickey – For service to thoracic medicine.
- Peter Richard Hicks RFD – For service to the defence reserves community
- Stephen Leslie Hicks – For service to veterans and their families.
- Timothy John Holt – For service to the broadcast media, particularly through radio.
- Dr Bruce Horsfield – For service to the preservation of military history, and to sport parachuting.
- Judith Patricia Horton – For service to horticulture, and to the promotion of gardening.
- Dr Kenneth Charles Hughes AFSM – For service to the community, particularly through emergency response organisations.
- Brian Maxwell Hunt – For service to the community of Murrurundi.
- Dr David Christopher Hunt – For service to education, and to mathematics.
- Gail Ellen Hyslop – For service to the multicultural community.
- Pauline Frances Iles – For service to aged care.
- Terence George Irvine – For service to the pharmacy profession.
- Charles Ronald Jackson – For service to the Indigenous community of South Australia.
- Ishbell Elizabeth Jackson – For service to the community of Newman.
- Percy Charles Jacques – For service to children, and to youth, through social welfare organisations.
- Peter Joseph Janssen – For service to conservation and the environment.
- The Late Ms Constance Anne Johnson – For service to people with breast cancer.
- Barry Ernest Jones – For service to rugby league, and to youth.
- Janice Margaret Jones – For service to community health, and to the visual arts.
- Marlene Jones – For service to music education, and to the community.
- Winston Lloyd Jones – For service to the international community particularly through eye health programs.
- John Vincent Keeley – For service to the community of the Australian Capital Territory.
- John Alistair Kerr – For service to community health through a range of organisations.
- Donald Kilgour – For service to the people and Parliament of Victoria.
- Alastair Robert King – For service to the Indigenous community of the Northern Territory.
- Geoffrey John King – For service to the community through a range of charitable organisations.
- Raymond James Kingston – For service to veterans and their families, and to the community of Murgon.
- Janice Ann Kinloch – For service to women, and to the community of Geelong.
- Squadron Leader Rodney Brian Kinnish (Retd) – For service to the community of Evans Head.
- Kieran Gerard Kinsella – For service to urban redevelopment, and to the arts.
- Aron Kleinlehrer – For service to the community through a range of organisations.
- Anne Lynette Knight – For service to the community of Laverton.
- Robert (Krishnan Ashok) Kumar – For service to the law, particularly through the Magistrates' Court of Victoria.
- Michael John Kyle – For service to the community of the Gold Coast.
- Paul Joseph Lahood – For service to the community through support for charitable organisations.
- Gregory William Laird – For service to veterans and their families.
- John Thomas Lally – For service to local government, and to the community of Karratha.
- Bruce Mervyn Langford-Jones – For service to the building and construction industry, and to golf.
- Robyn Giselle Latimer – For service to community health.
- Rose Lavinia Lehmann – For service to the community of Lockhart.
- Peter Coleman Lewis – For service to the community through aged care and cultural organisations.
- The late Mr Edgars Lideman – For service to aged welfare.
- Michael Lipshutz – For service to the community through a range of roles.
- Claude Lombard – For service to the printing industry, and to the community.
- Margaret Ann Lonsdale – For service to dancesport.
- Philippa Joan Lovely – For service to the community through a range of organisations.
- Dr Andrew James Luck – For service to medicine in the field of colorectal surgery.
- Jillean Leigh Ludwell – For service to the conveyancing profession.
- David Steven Lyas – For service to youth in Adelaide.
- John Rowland McAtee – For service to the community, particularly through Lions eye health programs.
- Pamela Jean MacDonald – For service to the community of the Hunter.
- Stuart Neil McDonald – For service to the community of Wynnum Manly.
- Michael William Mace – For service to community theatre.
- Laurence Henry McEvoy – For service to veterans, particularly through the Rats of Tobruk Association.
- Commander Warwick Donald Macfarlane – For service to community safety through protective security.
- Moya Theresa McGuiness – For service to education.
- Gerard Anthony McInerney – For service to the pharmacy profession, and to the community.
- Therese Yvonne McKenney – For service to the community through social welfare organisations.
- Bruce Gordon McKenzie – For service to veterans and their families.
- Tazuko McLaren – For service to education, and to Japan-Australia relations.
- Maxwell John McLean AFSM – For service to the community of Moyston.
- Peter Edward McMahon – For service to veterans and their families.
- Malcolm Peter Macpherson – For service to golf.
- Marilyn Gayle McQualter – For service to the community of Whittlesea.
- Annette Carmel Madden – For service to aged care.
- Ross Curtis Maddock – For service to Australia-Taiwan trade and business relations.
- Dr Peter Gerald Mansfield – For service to community history and heritage preservation.
- Richard Marocco – For service to the community of Port Macquarie.
- Carolyn Joy Martin – For service to local government, and to the community of Port Adelaide and Enfield.
- Cathryn Fay Martin – For service to the community of the Central Tablelands.
- Jean Martin – For service to people living with a disability in Cessnock.
- Lynette Mary Martin – For service to the community of Mount Gambier.
- Alan Gould Mather – For service to the community of Inverell.
- Robert Graham Matthews – For service to cricket in Victoria.
- Melvyn Hanley Mayer – For service to the community of Coolamon, and to radio broadcast production.
- Dominic Mick Mazzone – For service to the music industry, and to the community.
- Margot Melzak – For service to the community of South Yarra.
- Robert William Menzies – For service to local government, and to the community of Coolamon.
- Madge Edna Merton – For service to the community of the Mornington Peninsula.
- Andrea Janice Messenger – For service to music.
- Domenico Salvatore Mico – For service to the arts in the Australian Capital Territory.
- Charles Nicholas Mifsud – For service to the Maltese community of New South Wales.
- John Barry Mildren – For service to the Parliament of Australia, and the community of Ballarat.
- Margaret Mary Miller – For service to the community of Warwick.
- John Huon Mitchell – For service to the community as a philanthropist.
- Sister Sheelah Frances Mogan – For service to the Catholic Church of Australia, and to the community.
- Dr Julie Ann Monis-Ivett – For service to the international community through health support programs.
- Gregory Phillip Morrissey – For service to cricket, and to the community of Parkes.
- The Very Reverend Father Walentyn Mowtschan – For service to the Ukrainian community of Perth.
- Samuel Salvatore Mugavero – For service to the Italian community of New South Wales.
- Armogam Murgan – For service to the Indian community of Sydney.
- Alan Joseph Murphy – For service to the community through a range of organisations.
- John Murray – For service to the community of Bankstown.
- Andrew Ian Murrell – For service to surf lifesaving, and to the community.
- Elsie May Mutton – For service to education.
- Dr Fred Nickolas Nasser – For service to medicine in the field of cardiology, and to the community.
- Susan Jane Natoli – For service to canoeing.
- Judith Nerryl Neczas – For service to children as a foster carer.
- Wilfred Joseph Norris – For service to heritage preservation.
- Susan Lindley Oakey – For service to aged welfare.
- David Joseph Ochert – For service to rowing, particularly as a coach.
- Daniel Joseph O'Keeeffe – For service to physics education.
- Mark Andrew O'Leary – For service to choral music and education.
- Wenda Jane Packard – For service to aged welfare.
- Christine Anne Paine – For service to local government, and to the community of Hawkesbury.
- Victor John Patrick – For service to the wine industry in South Australia.
- Dr Elizabeth Mary Pattison – For service to the community through youth and social welfare projects.
- Jan Paulga – For service to veterans and their families.
- Graeme Stephen Pearce – For service to community of Mandurang.
- Garry Lyle Pearson – For service to dentistry, and to education in Victoria.
- Dr Ralph Leslie Peters – For service to medicine, and to the community of the Derwent Valley.
- Francis Victor Phillips – For service to the community of Melbourne.
- Vincenzo Princi – For service to football, and to the community.
- Barrie Alexander Provan – For service to the community of Queenscliff.
- Rodney George (Jim) Quick – For service to veterans and their families.
- Julie Margaret Quinton – For service to the community of Warrandyte.
- Dianne Joyce Radford – For service to the community of Ararat.
- Associate Professor Julian Lockhart Rait – For service to ophthalmology, and to the development of overseas aid.
- Robert Jon Reed – For service to social welfare programs, and to the law.
- Lindsay Michael Renwick – For service to local government, and to the community of Deniliquin.
- Bruce Graeme Richardson – For service to the community of Berri.
- Pamela Richardson – For service to veterans and their families, and to the community of Mascot.
- Ian Stanley Rickards – For service to youth through aviation programs.
- The Reverend Ivan Alexander Roberts – For service to the Uniting Church in Australia, and to the Myall Creek Memorial.
- Rhys Ainslie Roberts – For service to the community through a range of roles.
- David Keith Rogers – For service to youth through cancer support programs.
- Linda Maria Rowan – For service to aged welfare.
- Geoffrey Richard Sainty – For service to conservation and the environment.
- Margaret Anne Saker – For service to the community of Narooma.
- Alan Merton Samuel – For service to the community of Glen Eira through a range of organisations.
- Peter John Sandercock – For service to the community, and to Rotary.
- David Aldo Sansoni – For service to the community of Baulkham Hills.
- James Mohan Savundra – For service to medicine in the fields of plastic and reconstructive surgery.
- Ian Leigh Sayers – For services to veterans and their families, and to the community.
- Michael Dundas Scott ASM – For service to the community of the Fleurieu Peninsula.
- Raymond Russell Selkrig – For service to the thoroughbred racing industry through a range of roles.
- Beth Serle – For service to basketball.
- Paul Gerard Shanahan – For service to international aid organisations, and to the community.
- Alexander Lachlan Shaw – For service to the community through a range of organisations.
- Margaret Eileen Shaw – For service to the community of North Queensland.
- Dr Gilbert James Shearer – For service to dentistry, particularly to endodontology.
- Father Francis Xavier Sheehan – For service to the Anglican Church of Australia, and to the community.
- John Leslie Sherwood – For service to Indigenous education.
- Marilyn Anne Singer – For service to people with Scleroderma.
- Elsa Johanna Skinner – For service to the community through charitable organisations.
- Nerida Adelle Smith – For service to people with Lymphoedema.
- Ross Smith – For service to the building and construction industry.
- John Lyall Snare – For service to the information technology sector and security standards.
- Raymond John Sneddon – For service to sports administration, and to the community.
- Owen Lindsay Sperling – For service to cricket.
- Dr Christos Spero – For service to science, particularly to oxyfuel technology.
- Andrew Spilva – For service to the community of Yarrawonga-Mulwala.
- Jan Lynn Stephenson – For service to golf, and to not-for-profit organisations.
- Stephen Bobby Stingemore APM – For service to athletics.
- Peter John Stokie – For service to the conservation of the Victorian malleefowl.
- Margot Ruth Sweeny – For service to the credit union sector, and to the community.
- Dr Chin Huat Tan – For service to the Chinese community of Western Australia.
- John Charles Taylor – For service to the community of Myrtleford.
- Aline Ethel Thompson – For service to youth through Scouts.
- Brian Kenneth Thompson – For service to surf lifesaving.
- Dianne Gail Thompson – For service to conservation and the environment.
- Edward John Thompson – For service to the community of Gooloogong.
- Neville John Thompson – For service to agriculture, and to the community of Temora.
- David Scott Thomson – For service to education in Victoria, and to the community.
- Geoffrey Robert Thoroughgood – For service to sporting organisations, and to the community.
- Gillian Shirley Tolley – For service to conservation and the environment.
- Carmel Tom – For service to naval veterans.
- Rachelle Ann Towart – For service to the Indigenous community.
- Roslyn Gwenyth Townsend – For service to the community of Armidale.
- The Rev. Father Francis Phuong Tran – For service to the Catholic Church of Australia, and to the community.
- Garry John Traynor – For service to adult education.
- Joanna Eva Trepa – For service to the Polish community of Adelaide.
- Mark Trepa – For service to the Polish community of Adelaide.
- Joseph Noel Tunny – For service to military aviation history.
- Maria Johanna Turnbull – For service to the community through social welfare organisations.
- Wouter Jaap (Walter) Van Nieuwkuyk – For service to the performing arts.
- Marg Ann Veltheim – For service to people who are blind or who have low vision.
- Roy Alan Veltheim – For service to people who are blind or who have low vision.
- Carolyn Janet Vimpani – For service to people with disabilities.
- Peter Damien Vizzard – For service to hot air ballooning, and to the tourism sector.
- Joan Yvonne Vosen – For service to education.
- Robin Edward Wales – For service to international humanitarian health care programs.
- David Neil Walker – For service to brass band music, and to the community.
- Graeme Archibald Walker – For service to the airfreight transport sector.
- Russell Alistair Walker – For service to the community of Victoria through a range of roles.
- Frances Adeline Walsh – For service to local government, and to the community of the Indigo shire.
- Edna Alma Walton – For service to the community of Portland.
- Christopher Wang – For service to the community through a range of organisations.
- David John Wark – For service to sport, and to the community of South Australia.
- Dr Katrina J R Watson – For service to medicine, particularly to gastroenterology.
- Dr Karen Susan Wayne – For service to the community of Victoria through a range of organisations.
- Patrick David Webb – For service to mental health organisations.
- Terance Oliver Welch – For service to the community of Maroochydore.
- Dr Anthony Paul Weldon – For service to the community, and to paediatric medicine.
- Merle Irene Wells – For service to social welfare organisations in Tasmania.
- Darrell Keith White – For service to local government in Victoria, and to sport.
- Glenn Darran White – For service to public administration, particularly to Australia-Nepal relations.
- Richard A R White – For service to community health.
- Ronald Trevor Whitelaw – For service to veterans and their families, to lawn bowls, and to the environment.
- Ross William Whiteman – For service to people with Motor Neurone Disease.
- Philippa Jane Wightman – For service to the community of north-west Brisbane.
- Jonathan Gregory Willis – For service to youth through Scouts.
- Carla Sinikka Wilshire – For service to migration and refugee support services.
- Graeme Keith Windsor – For service to parachuting.
- June Woods – For service to children with an illness and their families, and to the arts.
- Glen Francis Woolley APM – For service to the Crown, and to the community of Tasmania.
- Ian Yarker – For service to the community through Rotary International.
- Margaret Joan Young – For service to people with a disability.

==== Military Division ====
- Lieutenant Commander Peter Donald Arnold, RAN – For meritorious service in the field of naval warfare training.
- Captain Peter Charles Ashworth, RAN – For meritorious service in the field of Navy aviation and project management.
- Commander Robert Allan Carlyon, RAN – For meritorious service in the field of electronic warfare.
- Warrant Officer Christopher David Cocker – For meritorious service to the Royal Australian Navy in the field of Fleet Support, Marine Engineering Training and in the performance of duties as a Fleet Warrant Officer.
- Commander Robert Thomas Steward, RANR – For meritorious service to the Royal Australian Navy in the field of governance and performance management.
- Warrant Officer Class One Craig Ralph Batty – For meritorious service as the Regimental Sergeant Major of the 10th/27th Battalion, the Royal South Australia Regiment; the Senior Instructor at the Warrant Officer and Non-Commissioned Officer Academy; and the Regimental Sergeant Major of the 6th Battalion, the Royal Australian Regiment.
- Warrant Officer Class One Kim Felmingham, NSC – For meritorious service as the Regimental Sergeant Major of the 11th Combat Service Support Battalion, 7th Combat Service Support Battalion and the 17th Combat Service Support Brigade.
- Warrant Officer Class One Terry William Hangan – For meritorious service as Regimental Sergeant Major of the Army Aviation Training Centre, the 6th Aviation Regiment and the 5th Aviation Regiment.
- Lieutenant Colonel Daniel Patrick Hiscock – For meritorious service to the musical and professional development of Australian Army bands.
- Warrant Officer Class Two K – For meritorious service to the Australian Army and the Australian Army Cadets in the field of catering and messing services from 2011 to 2017.
- Colonel Kirk Marcel Lloyd – For meritorious performance of duty to the Australian Army in industrial relations, remuneration and employment category management.
- Major Gregory John Wilsen – For meritorious performance of duty in the progression of the medical imaging capability in the Royal Australian Army Medical Corps.
- Squadron Leader David Earl Borg – For meritorious performance of duty in air base aviation safety and air traffic control development.
- Warrant Officer Brett Karl Byers – For meritorious performance of duty in delivering innovative catering solutions and the coordination of executive events for the Royal Australian Air Force.
- Air Commodore Leon Nolan Phillips – For meritorious service in capability acquisition and sustainment for the Australian Defence Force.

==== Honorary Division ====
- Dr Friedbert Kohler – For service to rehabilitation medicine.
- David Stewart Mac Laren – For service to the art of woodwork, and to the community of Bungendore.
- Lavinia June Petrie – For service to athletics in Victoria.
- Jeanne Villani – For service to the preservation of heritage gardens.

== Meritorius Service ==
Summary:
Media notes:

=== Public Service Medal (PSM) ===
Public Service Medal ribbon

Federal

- Marc Anthony Ablong – For outstanding public service through the advancement of Australia's defence capability.
- Geoffrey Ian Atkinson – For outstanding public service in the role of State Manager of AusIndustry's Tasmanian Office.
- Kevin James Bradley – For outstanding public service through the digital preservation of audio visual heritage material.
- Karen Maree Gooden – For outstanding public service to the improvement of outcomes for job seekers.
- Ian Ross Jamieson – For outstanding public service in the policy, program and delivery of Commonwealth aged care.
- David William Lloyd – For outstanding public service through professional contributions to the betterment of the Commonwealth's laws, and to the benefit of national security.
- Robert William McMahon – For outstanding public service to the improvement of the lives of vulnerable members of the community.
- Brendan Ewen McRandle – For outstanding public service in the development and delivery of the Western Sydney Airport project to the construction stage.
- Nicole Lisa Middleton – For outstanding public service in the areas of project, property and security management.
- Sandra Denise Parker – For outstanding public service in the area of workplace relations.
- John Davidson Reid – For outstanding public service through the provision of legal advice to the Commonwealth.
- Trevor John Thomas – For outstanding public service in the areas of foreign investment and superannuation.
- Susan Margaret Weston – For outstanding public service in advancing the National Innovation and Science Agenda.

New South Wales

- David Archibald Collins – For outstanding public service to vocational education in New South Wales.
- Cathryn Patricia Cox – For outstanding public service to health systems planning in New South Wales.
- Leona Carol DEI Rossi – For outstanding public service through project management roles with the New South Wales Police Force.
- Tracey Marie Hall – For outstanding public service to the justice sector in New South Wales.
- Robert Murjanto Lagaida – For outstanding public service to financial management in the health care sector in New South Wales.
- Dr Karin Anne Lines – For outstanding public service to mental health care in New South Wales.
- Andrew Phillip Nicholls – For outstanding public service to transport and insurance policy development and reform in New South Wales.
- Ashley Peter Wielinga – For outstanding public service to local government administration in New South Wales.

Victoria

- Anthony John Bugden – For outstanding public service to human resource management in the education sector in Victoria.
- Peter James Corkill – For outstanding public service to science and mathematics education in Victoria.
- Adam Phillip Fennessy – For outstanding public service to a range of government departments in Victoria.
- Christopher James Joustra – For outstanding public service to education in Victoria.
- Raymond William Purdey – For outstanding public service to parliamentary institutions in Victoria.
- Sandra May Stewart – For outstanding public service to education in the Mallee district of Victoria.
- Claire Michelle Waterman – For outstanding public service to family violence system reforms in Victoria.

Queensland

- Jody Lynette Brumby – For outstanding public service to the community of Queensland.
- Sarah Ann Buckler – For outstanding public service to investment, regional development and corporate governance in Queensland.
- Dr Sharon Kelly – For outstanding public service to the health sector in Queensland.
- Colette Cornelia McCool – For outstanding public service to the City of the Gold Coast in Queensland.
- Filomena Morgan – For outstanding public service through a range of coordination and governance roles in Queensland.
- Helen Anne Mullins – For outstanding public service to arts education in Queensland.
- Edward Alphonse Natera – For outstanding public service to local government and Indigenous communities in Queensland.
- Dr James Athol Thompson – For outstanding public service in the area of biosecurity in Queensland.

Western Australia

- Margaret Joan Allen – For outstanding public service to the libraries sector in Western Australia.

South Australia

- Terry Joseph Buss – For outstanding public service to local government in South Australia.
- Kevin Michael Cantley – For outstanding public service to financial management and infrastructure development in South Australia.
- Kristie Ellen Cook – For outstanding public service to the health sector in South Australia.
- Professor Maria Crotty – For outstanding public service in the rehabilitation sector in South Australia.
- Dr Raluca Tudor – For outstanding public service to the mental health of older persons in South Australia.
- Tina Maria Ward – For outstanding public service in the area of disability housing and support in South Australia.

Tasmania

- Gail Heather Ward – For outstanding public service to breast cancer screening for women in Tasmania.

Australian Capital Territory

- The late Dr Karl John Alderson – For outstanding public service to justice policy and reform in the Australian Capital Territory.
- Phillip Charles Green – For outstanding public service to the electoral system in the Australian Capital Territory.

=== Australian Police Medal (APM) ===
Australian Police Medal ribbon

Federal

- Detective Superintendent Damien Luke Appleby
- Detective Acting Superintendent Melissa Anne Northam
- Commander Susan Karen Thomas

New South Wales

- Detective Superintendent Wayne Benson
- Assistant Commissioner Joseph John Cassar
- Detective Superintendent Gavin Michael Dengate,
- Superintendent Michael John Fitzgerald
- Detective Chief Superintendent Jenny Hayes
- Senior Sergeant Malcolm David Jeffs
- Chief Inspector Stephen James McGrath
- Detective Chief Inspector Angelo Memmolo
- Detective Superintendent Gary David Merryweather
- Sergeant Bradley John Wittle

Victoria

- Superintendent Timothy John Hansen
- Superintendent Lisa Joy Hardeman
- Superintendent Darren Grant Harris
- Sergeant Mark Stanley Higginbotham
- Detective Superintendent Graham John Kent
- Inspector Margaret Ann Lewis
- Senior Constable Andrew Scott Neil
- Leading Senior Constable Toni Anne Redshaw
- Superintendent Stephen Barry White

Queensland

- Superintendent Michael John Brady
- Inspector Keiryn Margaret Dermody
- Chief Superintendent Kevin Anthony Guteridge
- Inspector Samantha Sanderson
- Chief Superintendent Brett Wade Schaferius

Western Australia

- Superintendent Ian Alexander Clarke
- Inspector Donald Merrick Emanuel-Smith
- Inspector Donal James Heise
- Senior Sergeant Gemma Louise Hennigan

South Australia

- Chief Inspector Keryl Louise Howie
- Sergeant John Edward Lewis
- Sergeant Neil David Sando

Tasmania

- Commander Glenn Andrew Keating
- Sergeant Sonja Louise Wilson

Northern Territory

- Sergeant Renae Moana McGarive
- Assistant Commissioner Michael Patrick Murphy

=== Australian Fire Service Medal (AFSM) ===
Australian Fire Service Medal ribbon

New South Wales

- Neal Coombes
- David Robert Cordery
- Craig Alan Eway
- Rodney John Hargrave
- Mark Charles Hoskinson
- Peter Joseph Levett
- Mark Christopher Murphy
- Paul James Reardon
- Ronald James Smith
- Peter James Wykes

Victoria

- John William Atkins
- Darren Joseph Conlin
- Glenn Raymond Jennings
- Russell Keith Manning
- Glenn David Marks

Queensland

- Kevin William Anderson
- Mark Peter Campbell
- Arthur Puccini
- Alan William Wells

Western Australia

- Raymond Alan Bonner
- Kelly John Gillen
- Darren Terry Klemm
- Rodney Scott Wallington

South Australia

- John Edge, ESM
- Paul Michael Fletcher
- John Cameron McNaughton
- Malcolm Douglas Munn

Tasmania

- Ian Stuart Bounds
- Dennyse May Groves
- Stephen John Webster

Northern Territory

- David Andrew Letheby
- Ian McKenzie McLeod

=== Ambulance Service Medal (ASM) ===
Ambulance Service Medal ribbon

Victoria

- Melissa Buckingham
- Susanna Mary Dean
- Darren James Hicks
- Paul Russell James
- Jeff Wayne Kennally
- Anne Elizabeth McIntyre
- Therese Frances Tuohey

Queensland

- Neil Kerr Hobbs
- Claine Warren Underwood

Western Australia

- Elisabeth Drage
- Andrew Christopher Richardson
- Terence John Ward

South Australia

- Clive Thomas Fordham
- Dr Cindy Lee Hein
- Christopher Martin Howie
- Stephen Paul Tasker

=== Emergency Services Medal (ESM) ===
Emergency Services Medal ribbon

New South Wales

- Susan Gaye Biggar
- Philip Alan Downs
- Evelyn Wilson Lester

Victoria

- Michael John Hellwege

Queensland

- Mark Connors
- Donald Craig Patterson
- Andrew Jason Wyatt

Western Australia

- Gordon Maxwell Hall

Tasmania

- Christopher Carl Draffin
- Nigel Winton King

Northern Territory

- Gerard William Lessels

=== Australian Corrections Medal (ACM) ===
New South Wales

- Brendan Cashen
- Linda Jane Ferrett
- Naomi Lee Prince

Victoria

- Gregory Charles Stillman
- Ian Martin Webb

Queensland

- Leslie Joseph Elliott
- Ursula Kylea Roeder

Western Australia

- Janette Margaret Allen
- Kymberley Alexander McKay

South Australia

- Christopher Coombe
- David Paul Franklin
- Sandra Mary Russell
- John Frederick Hay

== Distinguished and Conspicuous Service ==
Summary:
Media notes:

=== Bar to the Distinguished Service Cross (DSC and Bar) ===
Distinguished Service Cross & Bar ribbon

- Lieutenant Colonel N, DSC – For distinguished command and leadership in warlike operations as the Commanding Officer of Special Operations Task Group 632 on Operation OKRA.

=== Bar to the Distinguished Service Medal (DSM and Bar) ===
Distinguished Service Medal and Bar ribbon

- Lieutenant Colonel David William McCammon, DSM – For distinguished leadership as Commanding Officer Training Task Unit of Task Group Taji Three in Iraq from May to December 2016.

=== Distinguished Service Medal (DSM) ===
Distinguished Service Medal ribbon

- Captain B – For distinguished leadership in warlike operations as a commander of a Special Forces Advisory Team.
- Lieutenant Colonel Stephen Andrew Jenkins – For distinguished leadership in the development and delivery of officer training capability for the Afghan National Army on Operation HIGHROAD from February 2016 to March 2017.
- Colonel Andrew David Lowe, AM – For distinguished leadership as the Commander Task Group Taji Three on Operation OKRA from May 2016 to December 2016.
- Wing Commander M – For distinguished leadership in warlike operations on Operation OKRA.

=== Commendation for Distinguished Service ===
Commendation for Distinguished Service ribbon

- Colonel Tony Archer – For distinguished performance of duties in warlike operations as the Chief of Future Operations, while deployed on Operation HIGHROAD from June 2015 to July 2016.
- Lieutenant Colonel Peter James Conroy – For distinguished performance of duties in warlike operations providing Security Force Assistance to the Afghan National Army 205th 'Atul' Corps while deployed on Operation HIGHROAD.
- Colonel Matthew James Cuttell – For distinguished performance of duties in warlike operations as the Chief of Operations, Headquarters Combined Joint Force Land Component Command-Iraq, while deployed on Operation OKRA, from March to December 2016.
- Captain Lucas Michael Holt – For distinguished performance of duties in warlike operations as the Current Operational Plans Officer for Headquarters Train, Advise, Assist Command – South on Operation HIGHROAD from May 2016 to November 2016.
- Lance Corporal J – For distinguished performance of duties in warlike operations as a Joint Terminal Air Controller on Operation OKRA, from July to December 2016.
- Corporal Stefan Guy Pitruzzello- For distinguished performance of duties in warlike operations as a Trainer within Task Group Taji Three in Iraq from May 2016 to December 2016.
- Wing Commander D – For distinguished performance of duties in warlike operations as Commander Task Unit 630.2 and Australian Target Engagement Authority within the Combined Air Operations Centre on Operation OKRA from September 2016 to January 2017.
- Group Captain Terence Rodney Deeth – For distinguished performance of duties in warlike operations as Director Combined Joint Operations, and Senior National Representative, Train Advise Assist Command – Air in Afghanistan on Operation HIGHROAD from March 2016 to March 2017.
- Air Commodore P – For distinguished performance of duties in warlike operations as the Commander Air Task Group, Middle East Region from July 2016 to February 2017.

=== Conspicuous Service Cross (CSC) ===
Conspicuous Service Cross ribbon

- Commander Sean Patrick Bowers, RAN – For outstanding achievement in enhancing the capability and management of Navy explosive ordnance.
- Captain Vanessa Louise Ganley, RAN – For outstanding achievement in the delivery of intelligence support to joint operations.
- Lieutenant Commander Barbara Jane Woodruff, RAN – For outstanding achievement as the Fleet Executive Issues Manager and Workplace Behaviour Coordinator in Fleet Command.
- Lieutenant Colonel Kurt Brown – For outstanding achievement in leading, planning and delivering critical operational Communications and Information Systems for Headquarters Joint Operations Command.
- Lieutenant Colonel James Patrick Campbell – For outstanding achievement in implementing significant reform in the structure and delivery of Army logistics.
- Lieutenant Colonel Melanie Paula Cochbain – For outstanding devotion to duty as the Commanding Officer of the Army Personnel Support Centre in the Australian Army.
- Colonel Peter John Connolly, DSC – For outstanding achievement in enhancing the international engagement of the Australian Army.
- Lieutenant Colonel Paul Duncan – For outstanding devotion to duty as the Operations Officer, Multinational Force and Observers, Sinai, Egypt.
- Colonel Scott Gills – For outstanding achievement in modernising the intelligence capabilities of the Australian Army.
- Colonel Suzanne Patricia Graham – For outstanding achievement as the Commanding Officer Joint Logistics Unit (South Queensland).
- Colonel Phillip John Hoglin – For outstanding achievement as Director Military Personnel Policy in Defence People Group.
- Lieutenant Colonel I – For outstanding achievement in international engagement and training in the Australian Army.
- Colonel Shaun Justin Love, CSM – For outstanding achievement in enhancing the strategic, operational and tactical communications capability of the Australian Defence Force.
- Colonel Michelle Irene McGuinness – For outstanding achievement in leadership and training development, and in international liaison.
- Colonel Brett Nathan Mousley – For outstanding achievement as the Deputy and Team Leader of the Capability Life Cycle Project Team.
- Colonel Penelope Anne-Louise Saultry – For outstanding achievement in providing legal advice to the Australian Defence Force, particularly in the areas of counter-terrorism, strategic operations and security.
- Lieutenant Colonel W – For outstanding achievement in advancing logistic governance and capability management within Special Operations Command.
- Group Captain Julie Adams – For outstanding achievement in training development and delivery at Number 1 Recruit Training Unit, Royal Australian Air Force.
- Flight Lieutenant David Callum Jackson – For outstanding achievement in the development and introduction of the Aircrew Performance Enhancement Program within Air Force Training Group, including gender and diversity initiatives.
- Chaplain (Air Commodore) Kevin Russell – For outstanding achievement in chaplaincy reform in the Royal Australian Air Force.
- Flight Lieutenant Thomas Patrick Scully – For outstanding achievement in advanced electronics engineering in the development of force protection systems for Australian deployed forces.
- Squadron Leader Darren John Shorter – For outstanding achievement in the management of the Woomera Weapons Test Range.
- Flight Lieutenant Douglas Ronald Susans – For outstanding achievement in the development of the operational capability of the C-17A Globemaster III aircraft fleet.
- Wing Commander Philip Paul Trigge – For outstanding devotion to duty while deployed as Commander Air Mobility Task Group, Middle East Region on Operation ACCORDION from July 2016 to January 2017.
- Group Captain Sandra Lea Turner – For outstanding achievement in materiel acquisition as the Australian Defence Force Senior Supply Liaison Officer in the United States Air Force Security Assistance and Cooperation Directorate, Air Force Life Cycle Management Centre, Wright-Patterson Air Force Base.
- Sergeant Christopher Colin Watkins – For outstanding devotion to duty in leadership, instruction and mentoring as a Divisional Senior Non-Commissioned Officer and Divisional Officer at the Australian Defence Force Academy.

=== Conspicuous Service Medal (CSM) ===
Conspicuous Service Medal ribbon

- Petty Officer Paul Berry – For meritorious devotion to duty as a Senior Imagery Specialist within the Australian Defence Force Joint Public Affairs Unit.
- Warrant Officer Cheryl Anne Collins – For meritorious devotion to duty as the Ship's Warrant Officer in HMA Ships Perth and Stuart.
- Lieutenant Commander Susan Elizabeth Dengate, RANR – For meritorious devotion to duty in delivering personnel and welfare support in the Royal Australian Navy.
- Lieutenant Commander Susan Louise Harris, RAN – For meritorious devotion to duty in the field of Submarine Workforce Management.
- Commander Leigh Andrew Jackson, RANR – For meritorious achievement in the field of Navy personnel management systems.
- Petty Officer Andrea Kerr – For meritorious devotion to duty in personnel management and, in particular, in support of the Commanding Officer, HMAS Harman.
- Lieutenant Commander Sandon Timothy Morrell, RANR – For meritorious devotion to duty in the field of operational planning and implementation in direct support of Australian Defence Force operations.
- Petty Officer Michael Andrew Steffens – or meritorious achievement in the field of Navy physical and self-defence training.
- Lieutenant Commander Stefan Edward Zohar, RAN – For meritorious devotion to duty in Navy exercise planning and Anti Submarine warfare tactical development.
- Warrant Officer Class Two A – For meritorious achievement as the Acting Exploitation Team Leader at the Defence Force School of Intelligence.
- Warrant Officer Class One Stephan Andrew Colman, OAM – For meritorious devotion to duty as the Command Warrant Officer of Joint Task Force 633, while deployed to the Middle East Region from January 2016 to February 2017.
- Major Matthew Peter Cross – For meritorious devotion to duty to the planning and force generation of the Joint Amphibious Force for Defence.
- Warrant Officer Class One Kaylene Grace Dyke – For meritorious achievement as the District Manager of the 17th Combat Service Support Brigade.
- Warrant Officer Class Two John Robert Matthews – For meritorious devotion to duty as the Communications Systems Manager at the Defence Force School of Signals.
- Lieutenant Colonel Matthew John Nash – For meritorious achievement in the delivery of joint operational training as the Commanding Officer and Chief Instructor of the Australian Defence Force Peace Operations Training Centre.
- Warrant Officer Class Two Christopher David Pleszkun – For meritorious achievement as the Manager Electronic Warfare of the 72nd Electronic Warfare Squadron.
- Major Paul Frederick Prickett (Retd) – For meritorious devotion to duty as the Executive Officer of the 3rd Battalion, the Royal Australian Regiment, the School of Infantry and the Parachute Training School.
- Sergeant R – For meritorious achievement as the Facility Security Manager and Technical Operations Planner on Operation OKRA from April 2016 to November 2016.
- Lieutenant Colonel Leslie James Robinson – For meritorious achievement in support of the United Nations' Mission in South Sudan from 2016 to 2017.
- Warrant Officer Class Two Nathan Allan Tolman – For meritorious achievement in the performance of duty as the Master Coach of the 1st Recruit Training Battalion, Kapooka.
- Warrant Officer Class Two W – For meritorious achievement in the development of Special Operations Engineer capabilities.
- Squadron Leader Simon Martin Bartlett – For meritorious achievement in organisational development in establishing Number 20 Squadron and Royal Australian Air Force Base Woomera.
- Sergeant Aron Edward Green – For meritorious achievement in the development and implementation of the Technical Facilitation and Administration Cell at Number 3 Control and Reporting Unit.
- Sergeant Benjamin Thomas Hutchen – For meritorious achievement as an Avionics Technical Instructor at Number 285 Squadron, Royal Australian Air Force.
- Wing Commander Steven Adrian Madsen – For meritorious devotion to duty in the field of aerospace surveillance and air battlespace management for the Australian Defence Force.
- Sergeant Dean Paul Muscat – For meritorious achievement in the enhancement of Air Force capability through improved counter-sniper, marksmanship, and military driver training.
- Group Captain Brendan James Rogers, CSC – For meritorious achievement as the Commander Task Unit 630.1 on Operation OKRA from March 2016 to January 2017.
