= Balkin =

Balkin is the surname of the following people:

- Amy Balkin, American artist
- Jack Balkin (born 1956), American legal scholar
- Lee Balkin (born 1961), American high jumper
- Rosalie Balkin (born 1950), Australian maritime lawyer and international legal scholar

== See also ==
- Balkans
