= Frances Finch =

Frances Finch may refer to:

- Frances Finch, (17th–18th century), Countess of Winchilsea and Weymouth, wife of Thomas Thynne, 1st Viscount Weymouth, daughter of 3rd Earl of Winchilsea,
- Frances Finch, Countess of Dartmouth and Aylesford (1761–1838), English aristocrat, wife of George Legge, 3rd Earl of Dartmouth, daughter of 3rd Earl of Aylesford
- Frances Finch, Countess of Winchilsea and Nottingham (c. 1690 – 1734), English aristocrat and social reformer, wife of 8th Earl of Winchilsea, daughter of 4th Earl of Denbigh
- Gloria Frances Finch (1910–2010), better known as Gloria Stuart American actress and artist
- Caroline Frances Finch, Australian sports injury expert

== See also ==
- Francis Finch (disambiguation)
