= Don Henry =

Don Henry or Donald Henry can refer to:

- Don Henry (environmentalist), Australian environmentalist
- Don Henry (musician), American musician
- Don Henry, American murder victim in the death of Don Henry and Kevin Ives
- Donald Henry (cricketer) (1885-1973), Australian cricketer
