= Chief of Guided Weapons and Explosive Ordnance =

Role in Australian Defence Force

- Incumbent; Daniel Fankhauser since 3 September 2026
- Department of Defence
- Abbreviation: CGWEO
- Member of: Australian Defence Force
- Reports to: Chief of the Defence Force
- Formation: 8 May 2023
- First holder: Air Marshal Leon Phillips
- Website: Official website

The Chief of Guided Weapons and Explosive Ordnance (CGWEO) is a three-star role within the Australian Defence Force (ADF), responsible for guided weapons and explosive ordnance used by the Australian Defence Force.

In 2023, after the release of the Defence Strategic Review and a recommendation to consolidate the ADF's guided weapons and explosive ordnance (GWEO) across the services, leading to the creation of the Guided Weapons and Explosive Ordnance Group (GWEOG), and the appointment of Air Marshal Leon Phillips, OAM as its head. This moved the responsibility of acquisition and sustainment of Explosive Materiel within the ADF from the Capability Acquisition and Sustainment Group.

== Chiefs of Guided Weapons and Explosive Ordnancee ==
The following list chronologically records those who have held the post of CGWEO, with rank and honours as at the completion of the individual's term.

Rank	Name	Postnominals	Term began	Term ended
Air Marshal	Leon Phillips	OAM	8 May 2023	3 September 2026
	Daniel Fankhauser		3 September 2026	Incumbent

== See also ==
- Current senior Australian Defence Organisation personnel
