= Francis Finch =

Francis Finch may refer to:

- Francis Finch (MP for Winchelsea) (c. 1602–1677), English politician
- Francis Finch (MP for Walsall) (died 1874), British Liberal Party politician
- Francis Finch (MP for Eye) (1585–?), English lawyer and politician
- Francis Oliver Finch (1802–1862), English watercolourist
- Francis Miles Finch (1827–1907), American poet, academic and judge

== See also ==
- Frances Finch (disambiguation)
