= Joanna Hayter =

Australian gender equality advocate and humanitarian aid worker

Joanna Hayter AO
- Occupations: Gender equality advocate, humanitarian aid worker

Joanna Hayter AO is an Australian gender equality advocate and humanitarian aid worker.

== Career ==
In the 1980s Hayter was Western Australian coordinator of People for Nuclear Disarmament. From 1987 to 1994 she worked for the Overseas Service Bureau as regional director of Africa programs. She then joined Save the Children UK and worked as country director in Vietnam from 1998 to 2000. Returning to Australia she spent two years with the Australian International Health Institute before moving to Myanmar as country director for the Burnett Institute in 2004. While working with AusAID on their illicit drugs program from 2007 to 2009, she also held several positions with the United Nations.

Hayter was CEO of the Melbourne-based International Women's Development Agency from 2010 to 2017. Under her leadership the agency's influence grew, with programs to benefit women and girls being run in the Asia Pacific Region.

She is a member of the Ministerial Council on Women's Equality, a panel which advises the Victorian Minister for Women.

== Honours and recognition ==
Hayter was named as one of the Australian Financial Review's Women of Influence in 2013. She was inducted onto the Victorian Honour Roll of Women in 2016.

She was appointed Officer of the Order of Australia for "distinguished service to women in the areas of gender equality and individual rights through leadership and policy development roles, and to the promotion of global health, peace and security" in the 2018 Australian Day Honours.
