= Leon Phillips (RAAF officer) =

Australian air force officer

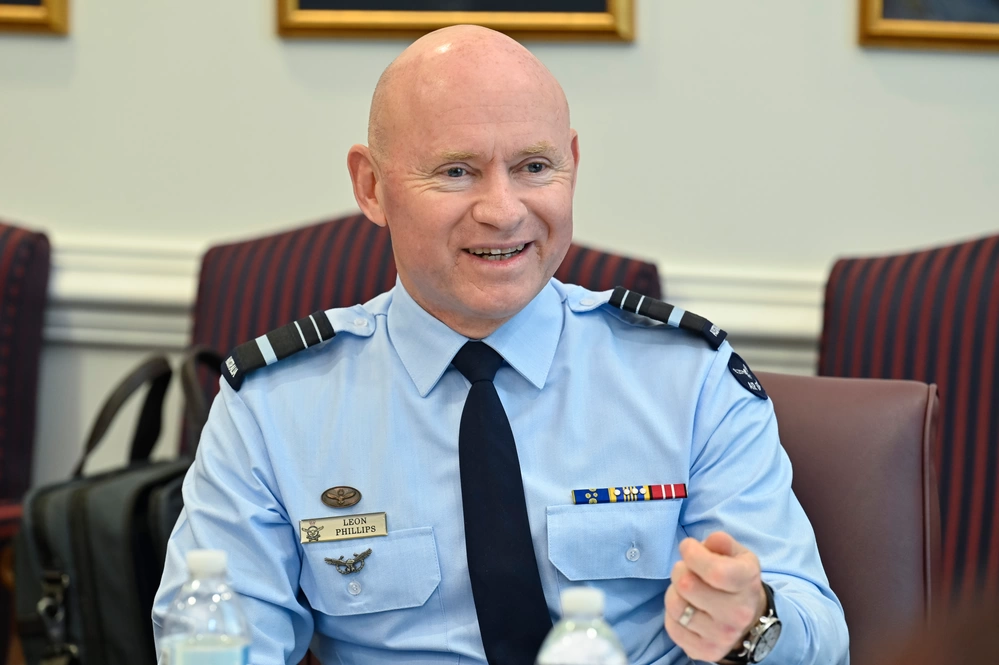
- Phillips at the Pentagon in August 2023
- Born: 1969 (age 56–57)
- Military career
- Allegiance: Australia
- Branch: Royal Australian Air Force
- Service years: 1987–2026
- Rank: Air Marshal
- Commands: Chief of Guided Weapons and Explosive Ordnance (2023–26); Head of Aerospace Systems (2022–23)
- Awards: Medal of the Order of Australia

Air Marshal Leon Nolan Phillips, OAM (born 1969) is a retired senior officer of the Royal Australian Air Force (RAAF). He joined the RAAF through the Australian Defence Force Academy in 1987. He was the Head of Aerospace Systems from January 2022 to May 2023, and the inaugural Chief of Guided Weapons and Explosive Ordnance from 8 May 2023 to 3 September 2026.

== RAAF career ==
In 2012, as a group captain, Phillips served as the Project Director of the Maritime Surveillance project, where he oversaw the acquisition of the Boeing P-8A Poseidon. He then served as the Officer Commanding, Surveillance and Control Systems Program Office from 2015 to 2016. In January 2017 he was promoted to air commodore and appointed the Director General Aerospace Maritime and Surveillance. As part of the 2018 Australia Day Honours, Phillips was awarded the Medal of the Order of Australia for "meritorious service in capability acquisition and sustainment for the Australian Defence Force". He was subsequently appointed the Director General Business Relationship Management from 2019 to 2021.

Phillips was promoted to air vice-marshal in 2022 and appointed as the Head of Aerospace Systems in the Capability Acquisition and Sustainment Group, before being promoted to air marshal and appointed as the inaugural Chief of Guided Weapons and Explosive Ordnance in May 2023. Phillips is the first engineer and the first person who is not a pilot to attain air marshal rank in the RAAF's history.

== Personal life ==
Phillips is married to Air Commodore Angie Castner and together they have four adult children. His interests include field hockey, having played in Australia's National Hockey League and competing for Australia at the Masters level, cycling and cooking.
