= Rhys Jones (Australian engineer) =

Australian engineer and professor

Rhys Jones AC
- Education: University of Adelaide
- Occupation: Professor of Engineering
- Organizations: Monash University; Wrexham University
- Known for: Aircraft safety and repair

Rhys Jones AC is an Australian mechanical and aerospace engineer and university professor of engineering. His main areas of research are aircraft structural mechanics, corrosion repair, and airworthiness. He has written extensively in the field, both books and academic publications. In 2018, he was appointed a Companion of the Order of Australia for his service to engineering and education.

== Early life and education ==
Jones initially studied Applied Mathematics at the University of Adelaide. He obtained his PhD in 1974, also from the University of Adelaide.

== Professional career ==
=== Academic career ===
After graduating with a PhD, Jones started as a lecturer in civil engineering at Swinburne University. In 1976, he joined the Aeronautical Research Laboratory (ARL) at the Australian Defence Science and Technology Organisation; he held the position of research leader in Aircraft Structures and Materials Division there until 1993.

In 1993, Jones moved to Monash University, where he took up the role of chair professor in the Department of Mechanical and Aerospace Engineering, a position he held until 2017. While there, he led the Centre of Expertise in Aircraft Structural Mechanics, focusing on enhancing the safety and longevity of aircraft structures. On his retirement, he was appointed professor emeritus in January 2018.

Between 2016 and 2019, Jones was also a professor in the School of Applied Sciences, Computing, and Engineering at Wrexham University.

Commencing 2021, Jones joined the Australian Research Council Industrial Transformation Training Centre in Surface Engineering for Advanced Materials (SEAM) as a senior associate investigator. He was also an adjunct professor at Swinburne University in the Department of Mechanical Engineering and Product Design Engineering.

=== Contributions to engineering ===
Jones' contributions have mainly concerned improving aircraft safety, an interest which began in 1988 when Aloha Airlines Flight 243 suffered explosive decompression in flight. He has conducted extensive research on the most effective ways to repair cracks and corrosion, which are leading causes of aircraft structural failures. In collaboration with RUAG and the U.S. Navy, Jones developed a technique to remediate aluminium corrosion by spraying fine metal particles at supersonic speed onto the aircraft bodies, effectively restoring them nearly to their original condition.

In March 2018, Jones joined the Australian manufacturing company Titomic Limited as Structural Mechanics and Integrity Advisor.

=== Professional service ===
Jones serves as an associate editor for the Polymeric and Composite Materials section of Frontiers in Materials.

== Awards and recognition ==
In the 2018 Australia Day Honours, Jones was awarded Australia's highest civilian honour, Companion of the Order of Australia, "for eminent service to mechanical and aerospace engineering, and to education as an academic, researcher and author, particularly in the area of aircraft structural mechanics, corrosion repair and airworthiness." This is the first time that this honour was awarded to a structures/materials scientist.

Other awards and achievements include:

- 2019 Best Paper Award 2019 Australian International Aerospace Conference
- 2017 Best Paper Award 2017 Australian International Aerospace Conference
- 2012 RAAF Maritime Systems Project Office Commendation
- 2008 Top Ten Defence Science Paper in the Period 1907-2007: the Australian chief Defence Scientist selected Jones's work on thermo-elasticity as one of the top ten Defence Science publications during the century from 1907 to 2007
- 1994 The Technical Cooperation Program (TTCP) Defence Science Award for "Defects in Composite Structures"
- 1989 Sir George Julius Medal, awarded by The Institution of Engineers Australia
- 1982 Institution of Engineers Australia Engineering Excellence Award, for his work on Mirage III aircraft

== Publications ==
=== Academic papers ===
As of March 2025, ResearchGate lists 558 of his scientific publications with 10,034 citations.

Meanwhile, Google Scholar lists 13,714 citations to his works, giving an h-index of 56.

=== Books ===
- Jones, Rhys; Callinan, R. J. (1979). A Design Study in Crack Patching. Aeronautical Research Laboratories. ISBN 978-0-642-89264-5.
- Jones, Rhys; Callinan, R. J. (1979). A Crack Opening Displacement Approach to Crack Patching. Aeronautical Research Laboratories. ISBN 978-0-642-89272-0.
- Jones, Rhys; Callinan, R. J.; Aggarwal, K. C. (1981). Stress Analysis of Adhesively Bonded Repairs to Fibre Composite Structures. Aeronautical Research Laboratories. ISBN 978-0-642-87827-4.
- Jones, Rhys; Goldman, A. (1983). Evaluation of a Vibration Technique for Detection of Barely Visible Impact Damage in Composites. Aeronautical Research Laboratories. ISBN 978-0-642-07909-1.
- Jones, Rhys; Paul, J.; Broughton, W. (1984). On the Effects of Delamination Damage in Fibre Composite Laminates. Department of Defence, Aeronautical Research Laboratories, Defence Science and Technology Organisation. ISBN 978-0-642-10882-1.
- Paul, J.; Jones, Rhys (1984). Analysis of the Double Overlap Fatigue Specimen. Aeronautical Research Laboratories. ISBN 978-0-642-07898-8.
- Jones, Rhys; Heller, M. (1984). On the Stress Analysis of Bonded Inserts. Aeronautical Research Laboratories. ISBN 978-0-642-10397-0.
- Watters, K. C.; Sparrow, J. G.; Jones, Rhys (1985). Shadow Moire Monitoring of Damaged Graphite/epoxy Specimens. Aeronautical Research Laboratories. ISBN 978-0-642-11350-4.
- Jones, R.; Baker, A. (1988). Bonded repair of aircraft structures: Volume 7 of Engineering Applications of Fracture Mechanics. Springer Science & Business Media. ISBN 9789024736065.
- Molent, Loris; Paul, J.; Jones, Rhys (1988). Criteria for Matrix Dominated Failure (U). Department of Defence, Defence Science and Technology Organisation, Aeronautical Research Laboratory. ISBN 978-0-642-14135-4.
- Baker, A. A.; Rose, L. R. F.; Jones, Rhys (23 January 2003). Advances in the Bonded Composite Repair of Metallic Aircraft Structure. Elsevier. ISBN 978-0-08-052295-1.
- Jones, Rhys; Baker, A. A.; Matthews, Neil; Champagne, Victor K. (5 December 2017). Aircraft Sustainment and Repair. Oxford, United Kingdom: Butterworth-Heinemann. ISBN 978-0-08-100544-6.
