= David Kissane =

Australian psychiatrist

David Kissane AC
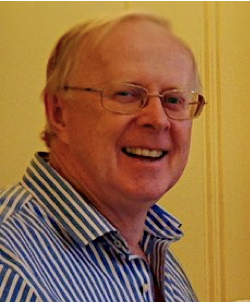
- Born: David William Kissane; Melbourne, Australia
- Education: University of Melbourne; Monash University
- Scientific career
- Fields: Psychiatry psycho-oncology
- Workplaces: Monash University; University of Notre Dame Australia

David William Kissane, AC (born 1951) is an Australian academic psychiatrist, palliative care physician, and psycho-oncology researcher. He is Professor Emeritus of Psychiatry at Monash University and Professor Emeritus of Palliative Medicine at the University of Notre Dame Australia (UNDA).

He is known for his research on demoralization, existential distress, family and group psychotherapy in cancer care, and communication skills in oncology and palliative medicine.

== Early life and education ==
Kissane was born in Melbourne, Australia, and schooled at Parade College. He earned his Bachelor of Medicine and Bachelor of Surgery (MB BS) from the University of Melbourne in 1974, followed by a Master of Psychological Medicine (MPM) from Monash University in 1991 and a Doctor of Medicine (MD) from the University of Melbourne in 1995.

He trained initially in general practice (FRACGP, DObstRCOG), before specializing in psychiatry with his residency (FRANZCP) at St. Vincent’s Hospital Melbourne and completing his consultation-liaison psychiatry fellowship (FACLP) at Monash Medical Centre in Melbourne.

== Academic and Clinical Career ==
Kissane began his academic career at Monash University and the University of Melbourne, where he rose through teaching and research appointments in psychiatry and psychological medicine. In 1996, he became the Foundation Professor and Director of Palliative Medicine at the University of Melbourne, establishing the Centre for Palliative Care and Australia’s first Master of Palliative Medicine degree program.

From 2003 to 2012, he served as Chairman of the Department of Psychiatry and Behavioral Sciences at Memorial Sloan-Kettering Cancer Center (MSKCC) in New York, and Professor of Psychiatry at Weill Cornell Medical College. During this period, he expanded MSKCC’s psycho-oncology service into one of the largest programs of its kind, founding six research laboratories and the influential Comskil Communication Skills Training Laboratory.

In 2012, Kissane returned to Australia to become Head of the Department of Psychiatry at Monash University, a role he held until 2019. He later joined the University of Notre Dame Australia as Chair of Palliative Medicine Research and was appointed Professor Emeritus of Palliative Medicine upon his retirement in 2024.

Kissane continues to practice as a Consultation-Liaison Psychiatrist with the Melbourne Oncology Group at Cabrini Health.

== Research ==
Kissane is best known for defining Demoralization as a clinical syndrome distinct from depression, characterized by poor coping, hopelessness, helplessness, and loss of meaning. His Demoralization Scale (2004) and its revision DS-II (2016) have been translated into over 25 languages and widely used in psycho-oncology and research of the medically ill.

In 2024, the World Health Organization formally recognized Demoralization (ICD-11 code MB22.2) as a psychiatric diagnosis, marking the culmination of Kissane’s 25 years of work in this field.

Kissane pioneered Family-Focused Grief Therapy (FFGT), a preventive model for families at risk of complicated grief, tested in multiple randomized controlled trials and summarized in his books Family-Focused Grief Therapy (2002) and Bereavement Care for Families (2014).

He also developed Cognitive-Existential Group Therapy (CEGT) for early-stage breast cancer patients, demonstrating improved quality of life and reduced fear of recurrence, and led Australia’s replication of Supportive-Expressive Group Therapy (SEGT) for advanced cancer, ultimately providing the Australian evidence for the benefits of group therapy in cancer care.

At MSKCC, Kissane led the creation of the Comskil Laboratory for clinician communication skills training, culminating in the Oxford Textbook of Communication in Oncology and Palliative Care (2017, 2026). He has also published influential work on the ethics of end-of-life care and existential suffering.

His editorship with Professor Maggie Watson of the Handbook of Psychotherapy in Cancer Care (2011, 2026) integrates the maturation of these psychological interventions.

=== Honors and awards ===
Kissane served as President of the International Psycho-Oncology Society (2000-2003), Chair of the Fifth World Congress of Psycho-Oncology (2000), and was awarded their Sutherland Award for Lifetime Achievement (2008).

Kissane has also served as the Chairman of the Faculty of Consultation-Liaison Psychiatry, Australian and New Zealand College of Psychiatrists (2001-2003).

At MSKCC, he was awarded the Alfred P. Sloan Chair of Research (2004-2008) and the inaugural Jimmie C. Holland Chair in Psychiatric Oncology (2008-2012). In 2012, he received the Klerman Award for Psychotherapy Research from Weill Cornell Medical College in recognition of his scholarship in the development of new models for patient care in medicine and psycho-oncology.

In Australia, he received the Clinical Oncology Society of Australia (COSA) Australian Psycho-Oncology Award (2017). Kissane was made Companion of the General Division of the Order of Australia (AC, 2018) for eminent service to psychiatry, particularly psycho-oncology and palliative medicine, as an educator, researcher, author and clinician, and through executive roles with a range of national and international professional medical bodies.

Kissane has been honored as a Plenary Lecturer at various international conferences and universities, including Sandra Goldberg Visiting Professor in Ethics and Palliative Care for McGill University (2004), Nina and Jerzy Einhorn Memorial Lecture at the 2005 Annual Congress of the Swedish Society for Medicine, Stockholm, Hong Kong University (2008, 2017), Taiwan Hospice Foundation (2008), University of Ferrara, Italy (2010), HAMAD Hospital Corporation, Qatar (2010, 2014), Brazilian National Oncology Conference (2011), University of Milan Family Therapy Training (2013), Roskilde University, Denmark (2013), University of California, San Francisco (2014), Dame Cecily Saunders Memorial Lecture for King's College London (2017), and numerous lectures at the European Palliative Care Association, American Psycho-Oncology Society and the International Psych-Oncology Society.
