= Rosalie Balkin =

Australian maritime lawyer, international legal scholar and public servant

Rosalie Balkin AO
- Born: Rosalie Pam Balkin; 1950 (age 75–76); Johannesburg, South Africa
- Occupations: Maritime lawyer, international legal scholar, public servant

Academic background
- Education: University of the Witwatersrand
- Thesis: A critical analysis of the treaty-making powers of the Union of South Africa and the Republic of South Africa (1978)

Rosalie Pam Balkin AO (born 1950) is an Australian maritime lawyer, international legal scholar and public servant.

Rosalie Pam Balkin was born in Johannesburg, South Africa in 1950. She was educated at the University of the Witwatersrand, completing BA, LLB and PhD degrees. She moved to Australia in 1977.

From 1987 to 1998 Balkin was employed by the Office of the Australian Attorney-General, culminating as assistant secretary, Office of International Law. In 1993 she was ACT Human Rights Commissioner. She then moved to London in mid-1998 to work as Director, Legal Affairs and External Relations Division at the International Maritime Organization, rising to Assistant Secretary-General in 2011, before retiring at the end of 2013.

In the 2018 Australia Day Honours Balkin was made an Officer of the Order of Australia for "distinguished service to maritime law through roles with a range of organisations, to the improvement of global shipping transport safety and standards, and to education as an academic and author".

As of 2021 Balkin is serving a three-year term as board member of Australian Maritime Safety Authority. She is a member of the Advisory Group at Seafarers' Rights International and is on the editorial board of The Tort Law Review.

== Selected works ==
- Balkin, R. P.; Davis, J. L. R. (2013), Law of torts (Fifth ed.), LexisNexis Butterworths, ISBN 978-0-409-33206-3
