= Don Henry (environmentalist) =

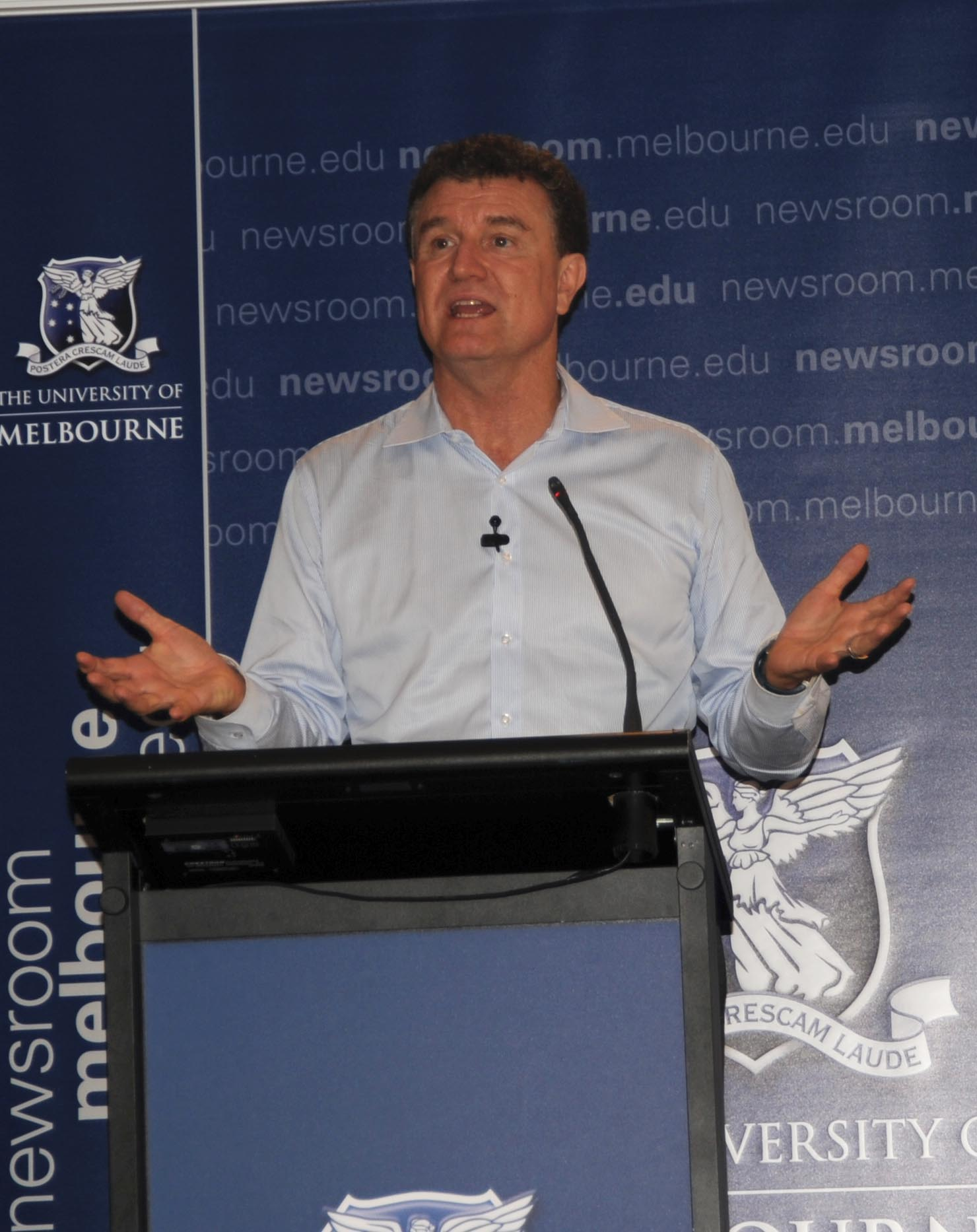
Donald Hugh Henry

Donald Hugh Henry AM is Enterprise Professor of Environmentalism. Previously based in the Melbourne Sustainable Society Institute (disbanded), he is in Melbourne Climate Futures and the Biodiversity Institute, as well as the Melbourne Business School, University of Melbourne. He is also an International Board member of Al Gore's ‘Climate Reality Project', arranging training workshops on climate science and impacts for potential and new leaders, primarily in Oceania.

From 1998 to 2014 Henry was the chief executive officer of the Australian Conservation Foundation.

Prior to 1998 he served with the World Wildlife Foundation in Washington DC. He is on the board of the Smart Energy Council.

== Awards ==
- 1991: Global 500 Environment Award from the United Nations Environment Program in recognition of outstanding practical achievements in the protection of the environment.
- 2008: Equity Trustees Not For Profit CEO of the Year award
- 2013: United States Association of Australia Prime Minister's Environmentalist of the Year Award.
- 2018: Member of the Order of Australia (AM) as recognition for his significant work in protecting Australia's native wildlife and the environment.

== See also ==
- Geoff Mosley
