= Caroline Finch =

Australian statistician

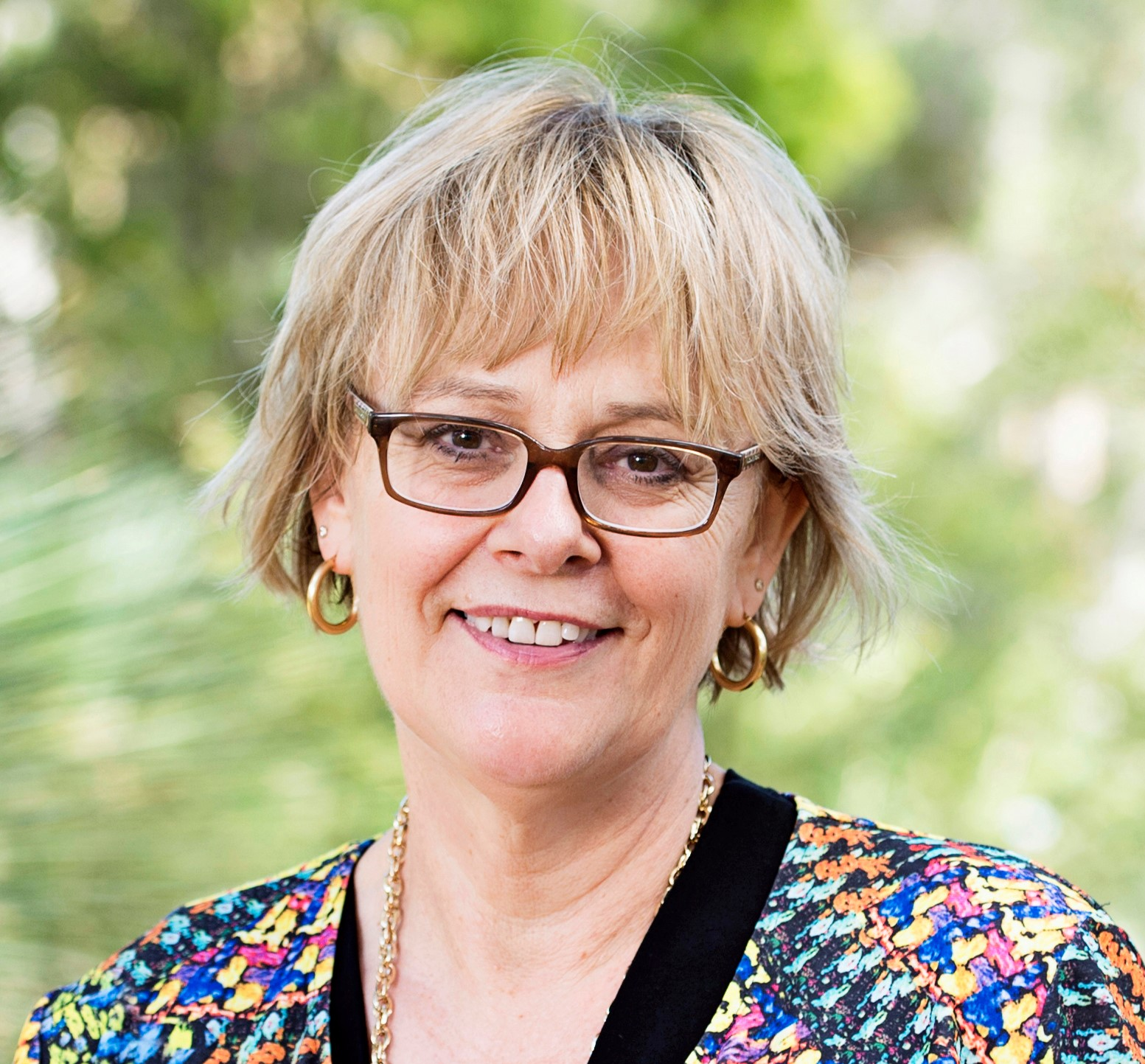
- Caroline Finch in 2018
- Education: Monash University, La Trobe University
- Occupations: Sports injury epidemiologist and sports injury prevention researcher
- Medical career
- Profession: Epidemiologist and Biostatistician
- Institutions: Monash University Accident Research Centre; Monash University, Department of Epidemiology and Preventive Medicine; NSW Injury Risk Management Research Centre, University of New South Wales; School of Human Movement and Sport Sciences, University of Ballarat; Australian Centre for Research into Injury in Sport and its Prevention (ACRISP); Federation University, Ballarat; Edith Cowan University, Perth, Western Australia
- Awards: 2015 International Distinguished Career Award by the American Public Health Association's (APHA) Injury Control and Emergency Health Services (ICEHS) Section; 2018 Officer of the Order of Australia (AO)

Caroline Finch AO is an Australian sports injury epidemiologist and sports injury prevention researcher. Her research has been adopted and used to directly inform safety policy by Government Departments of Sport and Health, health promotion and injury prevention agencies, and peak sports bodies both within Australia and internationally. Her injury prevention research has been applied to falls in older people, road safety, workplace safety and injuries in children.

== Education ==
Finch graduated from Monash University, Melbourne in 1983 with a BSc (Hons, 1st Class) majoring in statistics. In 1985 La Trobe University awarded her a MSc in Statistics. In 1995 she was awarded a PhD in Mathematical Statistics from Monash University for a thesis titled: Fasting plasma glucose distributions and their implications for the diagnostic criteria for non-insulin dependent diabetes mellitus in Pacific populations.

At high school Finch was interested in disease prevention. As an undergraduate student she realised this interest could be combined with her strong mathematics and statistics skills which led to her career as an epidemiologist and biostatistician.

== Career ==
Finch began work as a Researcher at the Monash University Accident Research Centre training in injury research from 1992 until 1997 and continued from 2001 to 2003 within the Monash University, Department of Epidemiology and Preventive Medicine.

From 2003 to 2006 Finch was Professor and Director, NSW Injury Risk Management Research Centre, University of New South Wales and then held the position of Research Professor, School of Human Movement and Sport Sciences, University of Ballarat until 2010.

In 2010 she returned to Monash Injury Research Institute as Research Professor and National Health and Medical Research Council (NHMRC) Principal Research Fellow in the Australian Centre for Research into Injury in Sport and its Prevention (ACRISP). ACRISP is one of only nine centres worldwide recognised as International Research Centres for Prevention of Injury and Protection of Athlete Health and supported by the International Olympic Committee (IOC).

Finch became the Robert HT Smith Professor and Personal Chair at Federation University, Ballarat, Australia in 2013. In December 2017 she was appointed Deputy Vice-Chancellor (Research) at Edith Cowan University, Perth, Western Australia.

Finch has held positions as a sports injury prevention adviser to the Commonwealth Department of Health and Aged Care, the Australian Sports Commission, Sports Medicine Australia, Sport and Recreation Victoria, Department of Human Services (Victoria), the Victorian Health Promotion Foundation, The Australian Football League and other national and state sports bodies. She is a continuing Board Member, Sports Medicine Australia, since 2015, a Member of the Concussion Advisory Group for World Rugby, since 2014, a Member of the Victorian Government Sports Injury Prevention Taskforce from 2011 to 2013 and a Member of the National Sports Safety Framework Committee in 1996, 1997 and 2003.

Funding for Finch's research has come from the NHMRC, Australian Research Council, VicHealth, the International Olympic Committee (IOC), the US and Canadian National Institutes of Health, Australian Federal and State government departments for health and sport and from peak sports bodies including the International Rugby Board, Fédération Internationale de Football Association (FIFA), the Australian Football League and Cricket Australia.

Finch has worked to improve community safety in sport and to drive significant change around children's and women's sport and in the Australian school system, to improve safety equipment and training methods in individual sports and to create a database for sports injuries. The work of Finch and her teams has led to government departments of health and peak sport bodies recognising that they have a duty of care to everyone, not just the elite athletes and that sports safety is their business as well.

"My end goal would be that any policy that has anything to do with promoting exercise or fitness or health in any context has a component that this will follow the principles of sports safety."

— Caroline Finch, January 2018,

Finch is a Senior Associate Editor (Injury Prevention) for the British Journal of Sports Medicine and the Injury Prevention and Health Promotion BJSM Series and a member of the Editorial Boards of the international journals: Journal of Science and Medicine in Sport, Injury Epidemiology and Sports Medicine. She has published over 250 articles.

== Awards ==
Finch was awarded the 2015 International Distinguished Career Award by the American Public Health Association's (APHA) Injury Control and Emergency Health Services (ICEHS) Section. The award recognised her "outstanding dedication and leadership in injury/violence prevention and control and emergency health services internationally with contributions and achievements that have a significant and long term impact on the field".

In January 2018 Finch was made an Officer of the Order of Australia (AO), "for distinguished service to sports medicine, particularly in the area of injury prevention, as an educator, researcher and author, and to the promotion of improved health in athletes and those who exercise."

== Projects ==
Projects Finch has been involved with include:

=== NoGAPS ===
Carried out from 2010 to 2013, NoGAPS (National Guidance for Australian football Partnerships and Safety) was a NHMRC Partnerships Project which aimed to develop, deliver, implement and evaluate new evidence-based guidelines for exercise training programs to prevent lower limb injuries in community Australian football. It aimed to identify factors that affect the application of evidence-based injury prevention interventions into practice in community sport, and to find evidence for the effectiveness of an evidence-based exercise-training program for lower limb injury prevention in community Australian football. The project involved partnerships with the Australian Football League, Victorian Health Promotion Foundation, NSW Sporting Injuries Committee, JLT Sport, a division of Jardine Lloyd Thompson Australia Pty Ltd; Department of Planning and Community Development - Sport and Recreation Victoria Division; and Sports Medicine Australia - National and Victorian Branches (SMA).

=== Preventing Australian Football Injuries through eXercise (PAFIX) project ===
Finch was the project leader of the 2015 PAFIX study which followed 18 community-level Australian football clubs in Western Australia and Victoria through an entire season aiming to understand and prevent knee injuries in community Australian football. The large scale PAFIX project was unique in its use of a multi-level approach to understand the cause and prevention of knee injuries in community Australian football. Published results provide information to assist coaches and sports clubs to implement injury prevention programs. Data was also collected during the project focusing on concussion with the aim to understand and prevent head injuries within a community Australian football setting.

=== Helmets and headgear ===
Since the mid 1990s Finch has carried out studies relating to use of helmets for both pedal and motor cyclists.

In 2013 Finch jointly published results of a study of associations between helmet use and brain injuries amongst injured pedal- and motor-cyclists. The study was carried out at the University of New South Wales, School of Risk and Safety Sciences under funding by an Australian Research Council (ARC) Linkage Grant: Pedal and Motor Cycle Helmet Performance Study. The project partners were: the Commonwealth Department of Infrastructure and Transport, NSW Roads and Traffic Authority (NSW RTA), Transport Accident Commission Victoria, NRMA Motoring and Services, NRMA-ACT Road Safety Trust and DVExperts International.

Finch has also been involved in research into the efficacy and methods of improvement of protective headgear in rugby union, rugby league, and Australian rules football.

=== Child safety ===
Finch's research has also encompassed several aspects of child safety including vehicular safety restraints, parent/caregiver supervision and water safety.

=== Fall prevention in older adults ===
Finch has been involved in research around falls prevention and implementation of fall prevention strategies in older people.
