= 2002 Australia Day Honours =

Appointments to various orders and honours

The 2002 Australia Day Honours are appointments to various orders and honours to recognise and reward good works by Australian citizens. The list was announced on 26 January 2002 by the Governor General of Australia, Peter Hollingworth.

The Australia Day Honours are the first of the two major annual honours lists, the first announced to coincide with Australia Day (26 January), with the other being the Queen's Birthday Honours, which are announced on the second Monday in June.

== Order of Australia ==
=== Companion (AC) ===
==== General Division ====
Recipient	Citation	Notes
Morrish Alexander Besley	For service to the community through the promotion of economic and social development, the advancement of science, innovation and education, and for distinction at the forefront of government and corporate responsibilities.	
Professor Glyn Conrad Davis	For service to public administration, particularly as an advocate for good governance, constitutional reform and the creation of infrastructure to enable the development of a 'knowledge-based' nation, to tertiary education in the field of political science, and to the community.	
Ross William Dunning	For service to the development of transport systems, particularly the development of modern and efficient rail services, to the export economy, to the construction industry, and to the community through support for cultural activities and charitable organisations.	
The Honourable John Joseph Fahey	For service to the Australian and New South Wales Parliaments, particularly through landmark reform of industrial relations, facilitation of high technology and industry growth, and for raising the international profile of Australia as Chairman of the Bid for the Sydney 2000 Olympic Games.	
Emeritus Professor Richard Norman Johnson	For service to education as the inaugural Chancellor of the University of Technology, Sydney, for the development of academic standards and leadership in education issues, to the Australian Council of Professions, and to the architectural profession.	
The Reverend Dr Gordon Keith Moyes	For service to the community in the delivery and expansion of social welfare and outreach services through the Wesley Mission, for fostering networks and partnership arrangements with other agencies to make services more widely available, and to religion.	
Maurice Lionel Newman	For service as an outstanding contributor to the Australian business and financial sectors through a range of policy advisory bodies, to the development and promotion of Australia's international trade relations, and to the community.	
Dr Carlo Salteri	For service as a leader in industrial and technological development in Australia, to the engineering, construction and manufacturing industries, and to the community through a range of artistic, cultural and health-related organisations.	

=== Officer (AO) ===
==== General Division ====
Recipient	Citation	Notes
Dr Joseph Thomas Baker	For service to marine science, to the development of commercially viable and environmentally sustainable aquaculture industries, to environmental research and protection, and to the progress of ecologically sustainable development in Australia and internationally	
Anthony John Beddison	For service to business, particularly in the areas of human resource management, recruitment, and consultancy services, and to the community as a leading contributor to a range of cultural, celebratory, medical research, historical and social welfare organisations.	
Professor Clifford Douglas Blake	For service to tertiary education, particularly through the development of vocationally oriented and professional development courses at Charles Sturt University, the provision of distance education services, for leadership in industrial relations matters in higher education, and to the community.	
David Charles Blyth	For service to blind and visually impaired people nationally and internationally, particularly as a leading advocate for access to education, training and services to enable economic independence and community participation.	
Professor Clement Russell Boughton	For service as a leading authority in the prevention and control of infectious diseases, particularly in the areas of research and teaching, to clinical medicine, and as an advocate for the need for vaccination.	
The Honourable Mr Justice Alan James Boulton	For distinguished service to industrial arbitration and labour relations at state and national level, to the Australian Defence Force, and to the development of labour policy and standards in the South East Asian region through the auspices of the International Labour Organisation.	
William Bowmore	For service to the arts as a collector, donor, benefactor and patron of galleries in Australia, and to young musicians as a teacher and sponsor of concerts and scholarships.	
Arthur Worrall Bragg	For service to primary industry through the Royal Agricultural Society of New South Wales, particularly through the provision of leadership in the area of future growth, for furthering relations between agricultural societies and for fostering the importance of the organisation in the Australian community.	
Emeritus Professor Charles Bridges-Webb	For service to medicine, particularly in the field of primary care research and practice.	
Clarence Raymond Briese	For service to the law, particularly the establishment of statutory independence for magistrates in New South Wales and the development of induction and education programmes recognised as models for common law jurisdictions.	
George Edward Chapman	For service to the promotion and development of ecotourism projects, to business, to the establishment and expansion of educational facilities and services, and to the communities of far north Queensland through a range of youth support, health research and social welfare groups.	
Rear Admiral Ian McLean Crawford	For service to veterans of the Korean War as the Chairman of the Australian National Korean War Memorial Committee, and for raising awareness in the wider community of the role of the business sector.	
Emeritus Professor Patrick Macartney de Burgh	For service to medical research in microbiology and immunology at the University of Sydney, particularly as a teacher and mentor.	
Dr Lynette Joyce Fragar	For pioneering service to rural health care and safety issues in Australia, particularly through the establishment of training courses to teach farm safety, identification of specific risk factors for the rural population, and focussing on injury prevention to reduce the numbers of emergency admissions to health facilities.	
Mavis Marjorie Gallienne	For service to community health in relation to Motor Neurone Disease at local, state, national and international levels, as an advocate for the development of support services, and for raising public awareness of this condition.	
Leonard James Goodman	For service to the community through the programmes of the YMCA and Rotary International, through youth employment initiatives, as a contributor to the establishment of Diabetes Australia, and locally through health, emergency services, educational and arts groups.	
Dr John MacDonald Grant	For service to sport, particularly through the Sydney Paralympic Organising Committee, and to people with disabilities as a contributor to improving the range and quality of medical, social and sporting rehabilitation services.	
David Alexander Hollway	For service to public administration, particularly as a senior adviser to government, to sport through the Sydney Organising Committee for the Olympic Games, and to the community.	
Professor David William James	For service to the development of regional education services in Ballarat and western Victoria, to science, particularly in the fields of liquids and lasers, and to the community through forging business and cultural links between educational institutions and regional centres.	
Carol May Kendall	For service to the indigenous community through 'Link Up', to fostering the reconciliation process through the National Sorry Day Committee and the Journey of Healing, and to the recording and preservation of Aboriginal women's history.	
The Honourable Michael Steven Knight	For service to Olympic and Paralympic sport, particularly in the area of Games' administration, to the New South Wales Parliament, and to the community of Campbelltown.	
Geoffrey Edmund Mitchell	For service to the Australian sugar industry, particularly in the areas of industrial relations, research development and extension, technological innovation and market maintenance, and to the Queensland community through a range of cultural, health, education and sporting organisations.	
Jacques Nasser	For service to the automotive industry through the development of export and trade opportunities for Australian manufacturing, as an adviser to government on international activities affecting Australian industry, and to education in the area of technology transfer.	
The Honourable Justice Robert David Nicholson	For service to the judiciary and to the law, to education, particularly in the area of university administration, and to the community.	
Professor Geoffrey Ivan Opat	For service to scientific research, particularly in the fields of theoretical and experimental physics, to tertiary education in Australia and overseas, as an advocate for the need to stimulate the interest of young people in the sciences, and to the community, particularly the Victorian College of the Arts and the Museum of Victoria.	
John Henry Pascoe	For service to business and commerce, to children's health, particularly the needs and rights of patients and their families, to the Children's Hospital at Westmead, and to youth training, nationally and internationally, through the Duke of Edinburgh's Award Scheme.	
Professor George Paxinos	For service to neuroscience at national and international levels, particularly the publication of atlases of the brain.	
Daphne Edith Read	For service to the community, particularly through the activities of the Royal Life Saving Society, in the development of social education programmes in East Timor, and to youth as an educator and initiator of arts programmes that foster children's participation and development.	
Sister Judith Elizabeth Redden	For service to education, particularly through the promotion of educational opportunities for girls, to children from refugee families and students from lower socio-economic backgrounds, and to promoting the development of programmes to encourage professional development for teachers.	
Associate Professor Peter Lawrence Reilly	For service to the advancement of neurosurgery through clinical practice, research, education, and professional organisations, and in the prevention and treatment of head injuries.	
Rear Admiral Ian Herbert Richards	For service to the community through the enhancement of the standing of the Winston Churchill Memorial Trust, and through executive membership of a broad range of health, national heritage and service organisations.	
David Thomas Richmond	For service to public administration, particularly in the areas of public works, housing, land development and health, and to Olympic and Paralympic sport through the Olympic Coordination Authority and the Olympic Roads and Transport Authority.	
Michael Bennett Robinson	For service to the law, particularly the development and encouragement of international practise for Australian law firms and the provision of assistance to the legal services structures in countries within the Asia Pacific region, to business and business regulation, and to the community through support for the tertiary and secondary education sectors, medical research institutions and private health service administration.	
Denis Walsh Rogers	For service to cricket, particularly as an administrator, to fostering growth within the sport, to pioneering the development of national juniors, and to advancing indigenous participation.	
Norbury Rogers	For service to the accounting profession, to business through executive membership of a range of financial, technology and research corporations, and to the community through the University of Queensland and the Australian Olympic Games Team Fund Appeal (Queensland).	
Dr Philip John Rose	For service as a leader in business management education, particularly in the area of research and the development of new perspectives on international business links, as a senior economic adviser to government, and to the arts.	
Commander Anthony Frederick Sallmann LVO	For service to the community, particularly as a major contributor to the financial administration of public hospitals and medical research institutes conducted by the Sisters of Charity, and to the cultural life of Victoria.	
Frank Ernest Sartor	For service to the community, particularly through the implementation of plans to improve facilities and infrastructure in the City of Sydney, and to support for the Olympic and Paralympic Games.	
The Honourable Justice Terence William Sheahan	For service to the law, particularly in the area of alternative dispute resolution, to the New South Wales Parliament, and to the community through organisations concerned with health, care of the aged, human rights and the environment.	
Rosemary Edna Sinclair	For service as a leading advocate for the welfare of abused and neglected children, particularly through raising public awareness, developing preventative strategies, education programmes and support services for the parents of 'at risk' children, and through fundraising endeavours to maintain and expand services.	
Professor Struan Keith Sutherland	For service to science as a leading contributor to research in clinical toxicology and the biology of Australia's venomous creatures, and for the development of the funnel web spider antivenom.	
Emeritus Professor John Melvin Swan	For service as an outstanding contributor to the advancement of Australian science, particularly in the fields of chemistry, marine science and meteorology, to education, and to the management, protection and conservation of the natural environment.	
Ronald Sidney Tauranac	For service to motor racing, particularly through the engineering design, construction and production of Formula One racing cars, providing young drivers with opportunities to compete at top levels, and sharing knowledge with others for the advancement of the sport.	
Barbara Joan Tynan	For service to the promotion of indigenous health in northern Australia, particularly in the areas of nursing and professional instruction, and to fostering relations between training institutions and indigenous communities to facilitate skills development in Aboriginal health workers.	
Dr David Ronald Warren	For service to the aviation industry, particularly through the early conceptual work and prototype development of the 'Black Box' flight data recorder.	

==== Military Division ====
Branch	Recipient	Notes
Navy	Rear Admiral Geoffrey Francis Smith, AM RAN	Appointment terminated 27 March 2015

=== Member (AM) ===
==== General Division ====
Recipient	Citation	Notes
Professor John Henry Alpers	For service to respiratory medicine, particularly in the areas of education and research, and through the establishment of coordinated regional services.	
Valma Esmé Angliss	For service to occupational therapy, rehabilitation medicine and education, particularly through the International Society for Prosthetics and Orthotics.	
Dr John Henry Arundel	For service to veterinary science as an educator and researcher, and to the profession through participation in the Australian Veterinary Association.	
Lois Catherine Baker	For service to the community, particularly the aged and people with disabilities, through the provision and organisation of care, respite and welfare services.	
Dr Donald Sidney Biddle	For service to education through the administration of the Sydney Teachers' College, and to the field of geography through the development of curricula and participation in professional geographical organisations.	
Patricia Enid Bjerregaard	For service to the occupational therapy profession in the areas of management and education, and to the community, particularly through the development of outreach and family support programmes for remote communities in far north Queensland.	
Valda May Broadbent	For service to the community through the Australian Red Cross, particularly the promotion of the organisation's work and programmes and by improving services.	
Ralph Maurice Burnett	For service to agriculture through the development of independent research into the use and application of broadacre crop protection techniques, and to farmer education, particularly through the pioneering of small local discussion groups as forums to disseminate information.	
Sylvia Mary Byers	For service to education, particularly through the development of services to provide assistance to children with learning difficulties living in rural and remote areas of Western Australia, and to the community through Rotary International.	
Dr Thomas George Callcott	For service to science, particularly in the fields of particle science, coal carbonisation and coal technology.	
David Ian Campese	For service to Rugby Union football as a player and promoter of the sport, and to the community.	
William Chanen	For service to medicine through contributions to the early detection, prevention and treatment of gynaecological cancer, particularly cervical cancer, and as an educator in colposcopy and the management of precancerous diseases.	
Ronald David Christie	For service to public administration, particularly transport management in New South Wales.	
John Kenneth Clezy	For service to medicine, particularly in the field of surgery, and to international humanitarian aid.	
William Stewart Coleman	For service to industrial relations, particularly as Chief Industrial Commissioner for the Western Australian Industrial Commission, and to the community through support for diabetes research.	
Beth Muir Dawson	For service to nursing and to the promotion of community health and care, particularly through St John Ambulance Australia.	
Peter Roderick Dornan	For service to physiotherapy, particularly in the treatment of sports injuries, to the community through the development of support services for men's health issues, and to military history.	
John Gordon Duncan	For service to the community, particularly through the Royal Agricultural and Horticultural Society of South Australia and the Royal Adelaide Wine Show.	
Dr Daphne Clair Elliott	For service to the promotion of women's education, particularly in the field of science, and as an advocate for improving the status and human rights of women.	
Peter James Evert	For service to local government, to the promotion and development of tourism in outback Queensland, and to the community.	
Michael Ernest Eyers	For service to public administration and policy development in New South Wales, and to sport through the Sydney Organising Committee for the Olympic Games.	
Kevin Francis Fahy	For service to the community, particularly through research into the history of Australian furniture making and the decorative arts.	
Dr Lorraine June Ferguson	For service to critical care nursing, particularly in clinical, management, and education disciplines, and through professional nursing organisations.	
Ernest David Ferris	For service to industrial relations and the development of industry in the Illawarra region, particularly through the Australian Industry Group.	
David Wycliffe Ford, CVO, GM	For service to the community in the area of protocol, particularly in the planning and management of visits of Heads of State and major public events held in Victoria, and to ex-Service and sporting groups.	
The Honourable Robert John Garlick	For service to industrial relations, particularly through the Industrial Relations Commission of Victoria and the Australian Industrial Relations Commission.	
Andrew Barry Gaze	For service to basketball, to Olympic sport, and to the community.	
Robert Gerrit Gelok	For service to the community through the Nhulunbuy unit of the Northern Territory Emergency Service.	
William John Gillooly	For service to public administration, particularly through the development of policies and programmes relating to sport and recreation and to national park and wildlife management, and to the community.	
Patrick Bernard Gilroy	For service to mining, particularly as a significant contributor to improving occupational health and safety in the mining industry through the development of policy and legislation relating to mine safety.	
Tonia Lesley Godhard	For service as an advocate for early childhood education and care, and to organisations that promote opportunities for children.	
Neville James Grayson	For service to public education as a primary school principal and as an advocate for the professional development and welfare of school principals.	
Kaye Annette Griffiths	For service to science in the field of ultrasonography, particularly as a researcher, educator and contributor to the advancement of diagnostic ultrasound, and to the promotion of the profession.	
Thorold Harvey Gunnersen	For service to the forest industry, particularly to sustainable timber resource management and development, and to the welfare of communities dependent on the timber industry.	
Dr Geoffrey Charles Hall	For service to the dental profession, particularly through the maintenance of standards and by pioneering a complaints resolution mechanism, and through involvement in dental aid projects in Pacific nations.	
John Edward Harrison	For service to sailing, particularly as an administrator at Olympic level, as a competitor, and to youth.	
Anthony Rowand Hewison	For service to education, particularly as Headmaster of St Michael's Grammar School and through the Association of Independent Schools of Victoria.	
Dr Peter John Holt	For service to indigenous people in rural and remote areas of Queensland, particularly through improvements to the delivery of medical services.	
Donald Henry Hyde	For service to the community through the promotion of activities to celebrate Australia Day, to medical research through the Centre for Molecular Biology and Medicine, and to children through programmes aimed at the prevention of abuse.	
Patricia Igoe	For service to the community of northern Tasmania as a counsellor, administrator and educator, particularly through the Road Trauma Support Team, Lifelink Samaritans and the Northern Region Disaster Planning Group.	
Donald Kenyon	For service to public administration, particularly the promotion of Australian trade and commercial interests.	
David Arthur Kinchin	For service to youth through the Scout Association of Australia, particularly as a leader, administrator and promoter of scouting opportunities for children from indigenous and ethnic backgrounds.	
Ross Kingsland	For service to education at the primary and secondary school level, particularly through the development of science education outreach services providing support for teachers and students.	
Deborah Catherine Kirwan	For service to the community by raising awareness of issues affecting seniors, and developing and promoting participation in health, safety, welfare and education programmes.	
Vernon Andrew Knight	For service to the community in the area of family welfare, particularly through the establishment and operation of Mallee Family Care and Chances for Children, and in the establishment of a social work course by distance education in rural Victoria.	
Associate Professor John Frederick Leditschke	For service to medicine in the fields of paediatric and burns surgery, to the promotion of child safety and accident prevention, and to the community, particularly through support for St John Ambulance Australia.	
Robert Burgess Leece	For service to sport, particularly through the design, construction and delivery of Olympic and Paralympic sporting facilities, management of the transport system, and to the community.	
Noelene Veronica Lever	For service to the indigenous community, particularly as a contributor to the establishment and operation of legal services and children's welfare organisations in Sydney, and by fostering children.	
Rosalie Mary Lewis	For service to the nursing profession, particularly in the fields of paediatric care and hospital administration at the Mater Children's Hospital.	
John Weston Mackenzie	For service to agriculture and agricultural policy through the development of economic, land and water management strategies, advocacy in Native Title matters, and participation in peak national agricultural and business organisations.	
Felicity Deirdre Maddison	For service to people with disabilities and to their families and carers, particularly through the Queensland Council of Carers and the National Disability Advisory Council.	
Emeritus Professor Ian Maddocks	For service to medicine, particularly as a pioneer in fostering the discipline of palliative care, as an educator in the field, and as a contributor to medical organisations concerned with the prevention of war.	
Robyn Leigh Maher	For service to basketball as a player and administrator, and for the promotion of the sport among young people.	
Abd-Elmasih Rashed Malak	For service to multicultural health services, particularly through the Australian Transcultural Mental Health Centre and Network.	
Associate Professor William Lee Maley	For service to humanitarian causes, particularly as an advocate for the elimination of land mines.	
Mary Frances Mallett	For service as a leader of the Aboriginal community in Tasmania.	
Dr John Robinson Marshall	For service to medicine in the field of general practice, and to the promotion of continuing medical education for practitioners through the Royal Australian College of General Practitioners.	
Robert Lionel Marshman	For service to vocational education and training, particularly in providing opportunities for people from a disadvantaged background and for indigenous people, to programmes aimed at generating employment opportunities, and to industrial relations.	
Dr Ian Roderick McPhail	For service to conservation and the environment, particularly through the development of Government policies and programmes, and to the reform of national parks and wildlife administration in Australia.	
Margaret Donaldson Moore	For service to the community of northern Tasmania through participation in a broad range of charitable and voluntary organisations.	
Lorraine May Morgan	For service to athletics, particularly as an administrator, and as a contributor to the organisation of the Sydney 2000 Olympic and Paralympic Games.	
Rex Henry Morgan	For service to education as founder and Executive Principal of Pittwater House Schools and through the Australian College of Education.	
Alexander Robert Morrison	For service to the wool industry, particularly through strategies aimed at promoting wool as a fibre and developing new wool-based textiles.	
Dr Patricia Diana Mowbray	For service to community health, particularly through the Australian 'Healthy Cities' movement in the Illawarra region, and for improvement to the environment through local community action.	
Athol Wilson Noble	For service to the community of the South Coast region, particularly as a contributor to the development and administration of cricket and Rugby League football, and to veterans.	
Joy Beryl Noble	For service to the volunteer movement as a founder, to the development of the principles and practice of volunteering, and as a contributor to the academic body of knowledge in the field of volunteering.	
Gregory Gordon Norris	For service to the Huon Valley community through local government initiatives aimed at tourist promotion, industry development and the establishment of health, social support and sporting facilities.	
The Honourable Dr Peter Edward Nygh	For service to international law, particularly through honorary assistance to the Hague Conference, and to Australian law through the Family Court of Australia and the Refugee Review Tribunal.	
Michael Vincent O'Brien	For service to the planning and organisation of the urban remediation works in the Homebush Bay area and management of the site prior to and during the Sydney 2000 Olympic and Paralympic Games.	
Thomas James O'Brien	For service to the community through executive support for a range of religious and charitable organisations, and to business.	
The Honourable Judge John Lawrence O'Meally	For service to the judiciary, particularly through the Dust Diseases Tribunal of New South Wales, and to the community through overseas humanitarian aid projects and membership of a range of charitable and education groups.	
Warwick Hood Olson	For service to the community, particularly in the area of overseas humanitarian aid through the promotion of the programmes and activities of a range of religious and charitable organisations.	
Professor John Michael Papadimitriou	For service to medical research, particularly diagnostic and experimental pathology, and to the community through the St¬†John Ambulance and Hellenic language and cultural organisations in Western Australia.	
Professor Judith Milburn Parker	For service to nursing, particularly in the fields of nursing education and the development of evidence-based nursing practice, and as editor of the international journal Nursing Inquiry.	
Mary Alice Pelham Thorman	For service to the community, particularly the social welfare needs of people with disabilities, overseas students and the aged.	
Gordon Winston Pickard	For service to the South Australian community as a benefactor to a broad range of charitable and youth sporting organisations, and to the building industry.	
Emeritus Professor Colin Nelson Power	For service to education, particularly in the area of educational research, and to UNESCO as the Deputy Director-General (Education).	
Ila Purdon	For service as a leader of the Aboriginal community in Tasmania.	
William Henry Pyle	For service to the dairy industry, particularly in the implementation of industry reforms, the development of new markets, fostering training programmes and encouraging technological innovation.	
Ian Jefferson Randall	For service to the community through the programmes of the YMCA and a broad range of youth, sporting, service, social support and environmental groups.	
Roger Hamline Riordan	For service to the community, particularly through the provision of a range of scholarship funds, and to information technology as a pioneer in the field of computer antivirus software.	
Robert Lancelot Rofe	For service to education, particularly as the Headmaster of Brighton Grammar School, and as an advocate for reforms focusing on recognition of excellence in learning and improvement in curriculum standards.	
Professor Jarlath Ronayne	For service to tertiary education as the Vice-Chancellor of the Victoria University of Technology, particularly through course expansion, fostering links with overseas universities and providing increased funding for research.	
John Clement Seale	For service to the arts as an Australian and internationally acclaimed cinematographer.	
Eric Baker Searle	For service to the development of special education resources, programmes and facilities for people with vision impairment, and to the establishment of support programmes for their families.	
Dean William Semler	For service to the arts as an Australian and internationally acclaimed cinematographer.	
Maggi Sietsma	For service to dance as a performer, choreographer and artistic director, and to dance education.	
Professor Martin Silink	For service to medicine, particularly clinical practice in the fields of paediatric endocrinology and juvenile diabetes, and through professional and community organisations that support research, education and advocacy for children with diabetes.	
Sister Judith Anne Sippel	For service to education as a leader, mentor and administrator in catholic education, particularly as the Principal of Mary McKillop College, Wakeley.	
John David Spencer	For service to the community through St John Ambulance Australia and through the provision of first aid services for the Sydney 2000 Olympic and Paralympic Games.	
Kenneth Hugh Spencer	For service to the accountancy profession, particularly through the pursuit and development of an internationally accepted set of accounting standards.	
Janis Coralie Star	For service to local government, particularly through environmental, water management and planning related matters, and to the community.	
Dr Thomas McIntyre Stevenson	For service to medicine, particularly in the field of orthopaedic surgery and education, and to the community.	
Alfred Street	For service to the community, particularly as a benefactor of the arts, medicine and education.	
Loys Eden Thompson	For service to the community, particularly through the Cancer Patients' Assistance Society of New South Wales.	
Marie Elizabeth Thompson	For service to education, particularly as a contributor to the improvement of education services in rural areas, and to the community, especially in relation to issues concerning law and order.	
John Anthony Townend	For service to people with diabetes, particularly in promoting the need for research funding and leadership in the diabetes movement, and to the fundraising industry.	
Julie Anne Warn	For service to the arts, particularly in the field of administration and through the professional development of the Tasmanian Symphony Orchestra.	
John Stanley Watt	For service to the Australian mineral industry through the development and application of nuclear analysis techniques.	
Ida Amelia West	For service as a leader of the Aboriginal community in Tasmania.	
George Richard Williams	For service to landscape architecture, particularly as an educator and administrator.	
Dr David Orme Wood	For service to the community, particularly in the areas of prevention and treatment of child abuse, and to medicine in the field of paediatrics.	

==== Military Division ====
Branch	Recipient	Notes
Navy	Captain Malcolm David Adams RAN	
Navy	Warrant Officer David Bruce Wilson	
Army	Brigadier Michael Lewis Clifford	
Army	Colonel Michael Peter Crane	
Army	Colonel Gary Phillip Hogan	
Army	Colonel Ian Charles Mitchell	
Army	Lieutenant Colonel Bruce Edward Peet	
Army	Colonel David Angus Smith	
Air Force	Air Commodore Paul David Ekin-Smyth	

=== Medal (OAM) ===
==== General Division ====
Recipient	Citation	Notes
Dr Richard Abicair	For service to the community, particularly the Lebanese community in Victoria through the organisation Australian Lebanese Welfare Inc.	
Dr Edward Ambrose Allcock	For service to the community, particularly as a general practitioner in the Maclean Shire.	
Betty Allen	For service to people with visual impairments, particularly as a volunteer preparing teaching and learning resources.	
Nellie Joan Ames	For service to the community, particularly through Your Place Drug Rehabilitation Centre, the David Collins Leukaemia Foundation and the Australian Continence Foundation.	
Betty Amsden	For service to the community as a philanthropist for the arts, animal welfare and health care facilities.	
Hilda Margaret Armstrong	For service to the community, particularly as a supporter and representative for the families of missing persons in the Hunter Valley region.	
Dr Clive Oswald Auricht	For service to medicine, particularly as an advocate for rural medical practice and rural internships for medical graduates, and as the designer of innovative medical records systems.	
Aida Olive Ball	For service to early childhood education in the Launceston area.	
Ross Ernest Barlow	For service to the Australian music industry through the promotion of the work of singers and musicians, and to the community.	
Nerida Gwynne Barnsley	For service to the community, particularly as a fundraiser for the Royal Alexandra Hospital for Children and the Children's Hospital at Westmead.	
Paul Martin Bateman	For service to the community through the Young Sydney Singers.	
Edward James Baynes	For service to the community of Indigo Valley through a range of local safety, conservation and recreational organisations.	
Russell John Beazley	For service to the community, particularly through the Salvation Army in the Northern Territory.	
Ruth Mary Beazley	For service to the community, particularly through the Salvation Army in the Northern Territory.	
Kenneth Frederick Beck	For service to the community of Taree, particularly through fundraising for the Mid North Coast Kidney Association.	
Patricia Jean Begg	For service to aged care through the Uniting Church of Victoria, and to the arts through the Melbourne Symphony Orchestra Society and the Ceramics and Glass Circle of Australia.	
Lyall Alvin Beven	For service to music, particularly as a singer and teacher, and to the community through support for a range of charitable groups.	
Dianne Frances Biggs	For service to the families of members serving in the Australian Defence Force.	
Valmai Ethel Bird	For service to the community of Rylstone through a range of health, aged care, emergency service and social welfare organisations.	
Eric Roberts Black	For service to the community, particularly through the programmes of Lions International.	
Audrey Mae Blood	For service to the community of Macksville through a range of social welfare, ex-Service and sporting organisations.	
Douglas St Clair Blow	For service to the community of Albion Park through support for a range of rural, youth, sporting, church and school organisations.	
Joan Bolton	For service to the community as a teacher of porcelain painting in rural areas of south west New South Wales.	
Giulia Bonacina	For service to the Italian community in the Wollongong area through a range of social welfare, cultural, women's and senior citizen organisations.	
Christina Urquhart Boughen	For service to the arts, particularly as a performer, teacher and examiner of piano, and through the development and organisation of the City of Brisbane Civic Concerts Programme.	
John William Bowdren	For service to the community, particularly through the Albury and Border Rescue Squad, the New South Wales Volunteer Rescue Association and Riding for the Disabled.	
Adele Alice Brain	For service to the community of Melbourne as an advocate for educational, health and welfare services for disadvantaged families and people with disabilities.	
Robyn Bree	For service to people with visual impairments through the Royal Blind Society and the Friends of the Royal Blind Society.	
Dr Desmond James Brennan	For service to medicine as a general practitioner in the Ashfield area.	
David Brook	For service to primary industry, particularly through the production, marketing and export of organic beef, to local government, and to the communities of Birdsville and the Outback.	
Ronald Thomas Buckley	For service to the community, particularly as an advocate for the rights of youth appearing in Victorian Juvenile Courts and as a probation order supervisor.	
Bruce Henry Buesnel	For service to the community through fundraising for the Children's Hospital at Westmead.	
Rosemary Burkitt	For service to the community, particularly through the Homecare Service of the Northern Territory Division of the Australian Red Cross.	
Dr Mary Barbara Burns	For service to the community of Wangaratta, particularly through participation in cultural organisations including the Arts Council and the Festival of Jazz.	
Robert William Byleveld	For service to the community of Walpole, particularly through voluntary service with St John Ambulance.	
Jacqueline Mildred Byrnes	For service to sport, particularly in the area of athletics.	
Ronald Bruce Cameron	For service to the finance industry, particularly in the areas of administration and regulation, and in the area of public relations.	
Irene Winifred Campton	For service to nursing, particularly as an administrator and fundraiser through the Royal North Shore Graduate Nurses Association.	
Jessie Rosina Canfield	For service to the local communities of Liverpool and Willoughby through support for a range of historical, aged care, welfare and multicultural groups.	
Joanna Susan Capon	For service to the community, particularly through the Arts Programme of the Children's Hospital at Westmead and Operation Art.	
Allan Kenneth Chatto	For service to the pipe band movement, particularly in the area of drumming and as a teacher.	
Betty Checkley	For service to the community, particularly through Baptist Community Services NSW & ACT and the Baptist Union of New South Wales.	
Terence Herbert Childs	For service to the community through participation in heritage and service organisations, and to education.	
Nicholas Dominic Chircop	For service to the Maltese community of Victoria through participation in a range of ex-Service, welfare, historical and recreational organisations.	
Charles Christensen	For service to surf lifesaving, particularly through the North Bondi Surf Life Saving Club.	
Graham John Christensen	For service to the community of Hervey Bay, particularly through the Police-Citizens Youth Club.	
Mervyn Frederick Christiansen	For service to the community of Mandurah through local government and a range of sporting, youth, aged care and charitable organisations.	
The Reverend Dr Gareth Hamilton Clayton	For service to the community as a chaplain to naval associations, and to youth through the Knox Grammar School.	
Dixie Brettell Clement	For service to the community of Mandurah through support for a range of service, social welfare, aged care and sporting groups.	
Francis James Colcott	For service to youth through programmes aimed at improving education, health and welfare services, and providing employment opportunities for young people.	
Betty May Comeadow	For service to the community of Euroa, particularly in providing assistance to children and young adults with reading difficulties.	
Beryl Inkster Coombe	For service to overseas communities through the work of Interserve, and to the Anglican Diocese of Melbourne in the areas of financial administration and education.	
Michael Gerald Coombes	For service to the community of Boorowa, particularly through veterans, social welfare and cultural organisations.	
Beryl Valerie Corney	For service to the community of Gympie, particularly through Gympie Meals on Wheels and the Gympie Cystic Fibrosis Association.	
Joyce Marie Costello	For service to the community of Portland through a range of charitable and sporting organisations.	
Joan Craggs	For service to the visual and performing arts in the community of Altona through the Hobsons Bay Arts Society and Advisory Committees, the Annual Festival of Arts and Palette Pals.	
John Daniel Crosby	For service to business and commerce, particularly as a property developer, and as a contributor to the provision of rail and water services.	
Howard Clement Crozier	For service to the credit union movement, to the wool industry, and to the community through participation in rural organisations.	
Sister Christina McInerney Cullen	For service to education as a teacher and role model for students.	
Gwenda Elizabeth Cunningham	For service to the community, particularly through the Australian Retired Persons Association and Zonta International.	
Dr Robert John Dalgliesh	For service to veterinary science, particularly through the research and development of vaccines against tick-borne diseases affecting cattle in tropical areas.	
Kevin William Davern	For service to industrial relations, particularly through the Finance Sector Union.	
Neil Charles Davie	For service to people with disabilities, particularly autism, through the foundation of the Allamanda Autistic Adult Accommodation Association.	
Jacqueline Anne Davie	For service to people with disabilities, particularly autism, through the foundation of the Allamanda Autistic Adult Accommodation Association.	
Stanley George Davis	For service to the housing construction industry, and to the welfare of veterans.	
Margaret Anne Dawes-Smith	For service to education, particularly as a teacher and mentor, and to the community as a volunteer with the Breast Cancer Support Service and with the Smith Family.	
Clarice Edna Dawson	For service to the community of Uralla through local government and a range of women's, health and aged care groups.	
Sister Eleanor Dawson	For service to the community, particularly through the provision of pastoral and spiritual support services.	
Nola Fay Dean	For service to the community, particularly through the Busby United Hospital Auxiliary.	
Rhoda Margaret Denton	For service to the community, particularly as a volunteer in aged care facilities.	
William Thomas Deveney	For service to the community through the development of aged care and youth services, and as a health administrator within the Melbourne metropolitan region.	
Ross Dewell	For service to sport, particularly as a referee for wheelchair basketball.	
Victor Albert Dey	For service to veterans through the Korean Veterans' Association of Australia.	
Dr Patrick John Docherty	For service to medicine, particularly through improvements to the delivery of health care services in the Mullewa region.	
Roy Doueal	For service to the community of the Mornington Peninsula, particularly through the Southern Peninsula Community Fund.	
Mabel Constance Doyle	For service to the communities of Boggabilla and Goondiwindi through the Australian Red Cross and the Anglican Church, and as a promoter and supporter of the performing arts.	
Gwendolene Mary Dundon	For service to the community, particularly through researching and recording the history of the Gosford area.	
John Keith Dunstan	For service as a journalist and author, and to the community, particularly as a supporter of the Berry Street Babies Home.	
Geoffrey Arthur Durham	For service to environmental conservation, particularly through the Victorian National Parks Association and the National Parks Advisory Council, and to the community through the Scouting movement.	
Maria Dziendziel	For service to the community of Glenorchy, particularly the Polish community, through participation in welfare, women's and senior citizens organisations.	
Frederick William Ebrey	For service to veterans and their families, particularly through the Returned and Services League of Australia and the establishment of Errol Noack House.	
Robert Alexander Elphinston	For service to sport through the Sydney Olympic 2000 Bid Company and the Sydney Organising Committee for the Olympic Games.	
Eva Engel	For service to the Jewish community, particularly as a mentor and supporter of refugees and through assistance to survivors of the Holocaust.	
Frankston Frederick Evans	For service to the community through the development of technical aids to assist people with disabilities, and to lawn bowls.	
Percy Neil Everist	For service to the architecture profession, and to the community through the Geelong Art Gallery and Lifeline.	
George John Ezzy	For service to local government, and to the community of Millmerran.	
Barry John Feld	For service to the community of Camden through emergency service, cultural and sporting groups.	
Max Raymond Ferguson	For service to the community of Fairfield through a range of aged care, health, school and church groups.	
Alan Graham Field	For service to the community of Nillumbik, particularly through organisations providing care for the aged and people with disabilities, and to the environment.	
Alan Finney	For service to the Australian film industry, particularly in the areas of film distribution and promotion.	
Patricia Irene Fisken	For service to the community of Ballarat, particularly through Riding for the Disabled.	
Margaret Helen Fitzgibbon	For service to the community of the Rutherglen region, particularly youth, through a range of social welfare and cultural groups.	
Peggy Fletcher	For service to the community through the development and administration of health and aged care services in the Armidale area.	
Dorothy Helen Foran	For service to veterans and their families through the Returned and Services League of Australia, Western District.	
Barry John Ford	For service to the community through the Ryde Asthma Children's Swimming Group.	
John Murray Forster	For service to the horse racing industry in north Queensland as an administrator of race clubs and as an advocate for the industry, and to the community of Richmond through local government.	
Rose Mary Foster	For service to the community through the Morega Physical Culture Association.	
Roy Bowden Fraser	For service to youth through The Boys' Brigade, and to the Baptist Church, particularly as an administrator.	
Marie Ethel Freeman	For service to children with disabilities through the teaching of handicrafts, and through the Guiding and Scouting movements.	
Eva Mabel Garland	For service to children with visual impairments as a transcriber of books into braille.	
Sister Wilma Anne Geary	For service to the community, particularly in the establishment of safe houses for women and children at risk from domestic violence.	
Bernard Michael Geary	For service to youth from disadvantaged backgrounds through community health and employment access programmes, and in criminal justice settings.	
Shirley Lynette Gemmell	For service to youth, particularly through the establishment and operation of the youth refuge service Restoration House Inc.	
Charles William Gerrish	For service to primary industry, and to the community of the Goulburn Valley through organisations including the Victorian Agricultural Society Association and the Mooroopna Base Hospital Board.	
Raymond George Gilbert	For service to local government through the Noarlunga and Onkaparinga City Councils, and to the community through a broad range of welfare, health and sporting organisations.	
Dr Arthur Donald Gillespie	For service to medicine and to the community, particularly in the Queanbeyan district, as a general practitioner and as an advocate for improved public health services.	
Leonard George Glare	For service to public administration through management of the Family Court of Australia.	
Maurice Raymond Gleeson	For service to the social and physical welfare of people with disabilities, particularly people with a visual impairment, through participation in a range of support organisations.	
Thomas George Goldman	For service to the Jewish community through sport.	
Neville Henry Goldsmith	For service to veterans and their families through the Epping Sub-Branch of the Returned and Services League of Australia, and to the community.	
Roger Lance Graham	For service to the passenger transport industry in Australia, particularly bus and coach operations, through the development of the industry's service standards and economic regulatory structure.	
Ian Heyward Granland	For service to Australian Rules football in New South Wales as a player, administrator and promoter of the sport.	
Gaetan Anthony Grech	For service to the Maltese community of South Australia, particularly through the Maltese Guild of South Australia, the Maltese Community Radio of South Australia and the Maltese Community Council of South Australia.	
William Green	For service to the community through the Southern Highlands Pipe Band and the 'Bundanoon is Brigadoon' highland gathering.	
Rosalie Denise Grieve	For service to the community of Naracoorte, particularly through local government and support for charitable and sporting organisations.	
Donald McKenzie Gum	For service to the preservation and promotion of Australia's farming heritage, to primary industry through the development of Red Poll cattle, and to the community of Pinnaroo.	
Nathan Gutman	For service to music, particularly as a violin teacher and mentor to music students in Victoria.	
Dr Allan Geoffrey Hahn	For service to sports science research, particularly in the area of rowing.	
Ethel May Hall	For service to the community of Currarong through youth, church and aged care organisations, and through the provision of assistance to children with learning difficulties.	
Dr John Kilburn Hall	For service to the community, particularly through the Rotary Club of Oakleigh and the establishment of the Foundation for Homeless Youth.	
Councillor William James Hanley	For service to the communities of the Hunter Valley through local government and a range of conservation, commercial, sporting and welfare bodies.	
Maud Kelly Hann	For service to the community of Narrabri through a broad range of charitable, agricultural and sporting organisations, including the Australian Red Cross and the Narrabri Show Society.	
Neil Verland Harcourt	For service to veterans and their families through the Burleigh Heads and Surfers Paradise Sub-Branches of the Returned and Services League of Australia.	
Cynthia June Harfield	For service to the community, particularly through the Scouting movement and sporting groups.	
Leonard Malcolm Harris	For service to surf lifesaving as a competitor and coach.	
Dr Diana Lorraine Hart	For service to medicine through the Australian Medical Association, the Royal Australian College of General Practitioners and the Nepal Cleft Palate project, and as an advocate for the role of women in medicine, particularly in general practice.	
Gregory Neil Hartung	For service to sports administration, to sport for people with disabilities, and to the Sydney 2000 Paralympic Games.	
Kenneth James Haylings	For service to the youth of New South Wales through the Scouting movement.	
Margaret Nancy Haywood	For service to the community of Mypolonga through a range of service, religious and sporting organisations.	
Samuel Thomas Haywood	For service to the community of Mypolonga through a range of service, religious and sporting organisations.	
Gwendoline Dinah Henderson	For service to the welfare of veterans through the Returned Sisters Sub-Branch of the Returned and Services League of Australia.	
Lionel Roy Hendy	For service to the community, particularly through support for patients and their families involved with the Queensland Liver Transplant Service.	
Diane Elizabeth Henry	For service to the community and to the Sydney 2000 Olympic and Paralympic Games through the organisation and management of the Torch Relays.	
Dr Margaret Bertha Henry	For service to education as an author, researcher, teacher and administrator in the field of early childhood education, particularly in regard to indigenous children and children with intellectual disabilities.	
Keith Heritage	For service to the community through a range of service and sporting groups, and to the funeral industry, particularly through membership of the Australian Funeral Directors Association.	
Michael Frank Herman	For service to the community of the Yarra Valley as a fundraiser for charitable organisations, and as a benefactor to medical research and emergency service groups.	
John Henry Hewlett	For service to primary industry in Victoria through the Murray Goulburn Co-operative, and to the community through the Anglican Church in the Diocese of Bendigo and the Rich River Golf Club.	
Dr David Charles Hickman	For service to basketball as a coach, mentor and administrator, and to the youth of the community of Eltham.	
Margaret Anne Hickman	For service to the community through the Morega Physical Culture Association and the Bronte Ladies Amateur Swimming Club.	
Henry Roland Hoare	For service to the community of Wollondilly, particularly for the design and construction or restoration of community buildings and facilities, and through service clubs.	
Barbara Anne Holborow	For service to the community as a magistrate and through organisations promoting the welfare and rights of children.	
The Reverend Canon Thomas Henry Hood	For service to the community, particularly to youth as honorary Chaplain to the Naval Reserve Cadet organisation.	
David John Hopkins	For service to veterans through a range of ex-Service organisations, and to the community of the Bankstown area.	
Maxwell Wallace Hopper	For service to education, particularly through the development of distance education programmes and the establishment and management of tertiary institutions in regional Victoria.	
Maurice Pell House	For service to community development, particularly through the Great Southern Area Consultative Committee.	
Dr Ian James Howie-Willis	For service to the community through researching and writing the history of St John Ambulance in Australia.	
Judith Margaret Hunter	For service to the arts in north Queensland, particularly through the establishment, management and promotion of the North Queensland Opera and Music Theatre, and to education and librarianship through the School Library Association of Queensland.	
Shirley Roma Hunter	For service to the community of Bogan Gate through the organisation and promotion of the Bogan Gate Centenary celebrations and as an office bearer in the Bogan Gate Branch of the Country Women's Association.	
Kenneth Lionel Hurley	For service to the community of Glenthompson through local government and a range of ex-Service, religious, sporting and community organisations.	
George Leonard Hutcheon	For service to local government and to the rural community of Coolamon, particularly through support for the North East Riverina Rural Counselling Service and the Allawah Lodge Aged Care Hostel.	
William Brett Iggulden	For service to music, particularly the Bellingen Jazz Festival, as artistic director, promoter, administrator and performer.	
Catherine Davidson Imrie	For service to the community through Meals on Wheels in the South Sydney district.	
Milton Brian Ingerson	For service to the Australian film industry as a cinematographer, producer and director, and through training and encouraging young people in the industry.	
Edward Sydney Ingram	For service to the community of the Myall Lakes, particularly through a range of social welfare programmes for veterans and the aged.	
Robin Margaret James	For service to the community of Manly through a number of charity and social welfare groups including the Manly Hospital Auxiliary.	
Peter Wadds Jeffery	For service to the arts through a range of media-related activities including film and television education, filmmaking, assistance to emerging filmmakers, and to the community through the operation of community television.	
Thomas Ernest Jelbart	For service to primary industry, particularly the stud sheep industry through the development of the Polwarth breed of sheep, and to the community through a range of agricultural, service and welfare organisations.	
Margaret Rosemary Jowett	For service to the community of Norfolk Island, particularly through the provision of health care services and the preservation of the island's natural and historical heritage.	
Alan William Keates	For service to the community of Wondai as a supporter of a range of commercial, cultural, welfare, sporting and tourism organisations.	
Irene Frances Keeshan	For service to veterans and their families through the Queensland Section of the Naval Association of Australia.	
John Kell	For service to the sport of shooting, particularly through antique firearm clubs, and to the community through research into and preservation of the history of arms in Australia.	
Barbara Elsie Kelly	For service to women, particularly through the Country Women's Association, and to the community through support for aged care facilities and sporting organisations.	
Ian John Kennedy	For service to the community through the Starlight Children's Foundation.	
Norah Lillian Killip	For service to the community, particularly through the preservation of the heritage significance of Parkville.	
Aubrey Wilfred King	For service to veterans through the organisation of the presentation of the French Medal to Normandy veterans and the annual D-Day Celebrations in South Australia.	
William John King	For service to the community, particularly through the provision of aged care facilities in the Port Stephens area.	
James Edwin Kirkness	For service to the community of Gosford, through a range of service, charitable, social welfare and youth organisations.	
Marjorie Dawn Knipe	For service to the community of Wentworth, particularly the aged, through the Wentworth District Hostel Society, Murray House and Meals on Wheels, and to the Country Women's Association.	
Pieter Anthonius Koster	For service to veterans through the Launceston Sub-Branch of the Returned and Services League of Australia.	
Dr Max Emory Lake	For service to the establishment of the boutique wine industry in Australia as a winemaker, judge, promoter and author.	
Bernice Adele Lane	For service to the community, particularly through the organisation Compassionate Friends.	
Robert William Lapthorne	For service to veterans, particularly through the Tasmanian Branch of the Totally and Permanently Disabled Soldiers' Association of Australia, and to the community through a range of health, service and sporting organisations.	
Lionel Laurie Latham	For service to the community, particularly through the Balmoral Uniting Community Centre.	
Donald Bruce Lawson	For service to the beef industry in Australia through the development and application of genetic selection and breeding techniques, performance testing and objective measurement of cattle.	
Peter Joseph Low	For service to the Chinese community of Queensland and to the business community of Fortitude Valley as a leader of Chinese community groups, a contributor to local health, safety and welfare organisations, and an instigator of multicultural events in the area.	
Charles William Lucre	For service to the community, particularly through the provision of pastoral care services at the Canberra Hospital.	
Edith Marie Lunn	For service to the community of Bendigo, particularly through the preservation and recording of local history.	
Joan Lynn	For service to the community in the field of crisis and suicide counselling.	
Dennis Ian MacKenzie	For service to public education as a teacher and administrator, particularly within the community of Bankstown.	
Sandra Kaye Mackenzie	For service to the community, particularly through the Sir¬†Robert Menzies Memorial Foundation.	
Valerie Jean Mackenzie	For service to the community of the Wimmera region as a music teacher and as a performer and director of amateur stage productions.	
Gregory Alan Mackie	For service to the community through the promotion of the arts, particularly the Adelaide Festival of Ideas.	
Jennifer Kim Maclennan	For service to Olympic and Paralympic sport as Coordinator of Volunteers for the Southern Highlands Olympic Committee, and to the broader community through health and education related organisations.	
Commander Norman Armstrong MacMillan	For service to the Australian Defence Force as State Chairperson of the Tasmanian Defence Reserve Support Committee.	
Bennett William Macpherson	For service to music as a conductor, chorus master and administrator, particularly through the Sydney University Musical Society and Intervarsity Choral Festivals.	
Earl Thomas Magee	For service to the communities of Manly-Warringah and Bathurst, particularly through ex-Service organisations and through youth sporting organisations.	
Claudio Magris	For service to the development and promotion of Australian cuisine and through the restaurant and catering industry.	
Dr Helen-Anne Manion	For service to the community and to medicine in the field of palliative care, particularly through the establishment of the Home Hospice programme.	
Dr Desley Ellen Marshall	For service to medicine as a practitioner and as an advocate for rural medicine, and to the community of St George through services for the aged.	
Jesse David Martin	For achievement in completing a solo, unassisted and non-stop circumnavigation of the globe without the use of fossil fuels, and for service to the community, particularly youth.	
Dr Bruce Robert Mason	For service to sport, particularly through the application of biomechanics to swimming.	
James Sydney Mason	For service to the community of Penrith and the lower Blue Mountains, particularly as treasurer or honorary auditor for a range of civic and sporting organisations.	
Margaret Mason	For service to the community of Gloucester and the Hunter Valley through local government, the promotion of tourism, and involvement in service, environmental and historical groups.	
The Reverend Dr Ian George Mavor	For service to the community through a range of church, social welfare, education and health groups.	
Archibald John McArthur	For service to entomology and to the environment through the collection and study of ants, and to the community, particularly through the National Parks Consultative Committee for the Lower South East Area, South Australia.	
David John McClelland	For service to veterans and their families through the Western Australian Branch of the Returned and Services League of Australia and as Chairman of the War Veterans Homes Board.	
Chris Lillian McConnell	For service to the community through a range of health and safety organisations, particularly organisations dedicated to improving the quality of life for amputees.	
Melva Claire McCrae	For service to the community through the Broken Hill Philharmonic Society Choir.	
Gladstone Paul McGowan	For service to agricultural science and agricultural consulting, particularly in the fields of sustainable agriculture, environment protection and water resource management.	
Joyce Veronica McGrath	For service to the collection and preservation of historical documentation relating to art and music, particularly through the establishment of the Australian Art Archives.	
Coral McGregor	For service to the community of Stirling through a range of service, welfare and sporting organisations.	
Dr Gregory Scott McKie	For service to cricket, particularly through support for youth cricket development programmes, including those for schoolgirl cricketers.	
Craig Gordon McLatchey	For service to Olympic sport through the Sydney Organising Committee for the Olympic Games and the Australian Olympic Committee.	
Eva Marion McPhail	For service to older people in the community of Claremont, particularly through the Aged Persons Support Services and the Friends of Wearne Hostel.	
Julie Margaret Miles	For service to children with disabilities, particularly through the development and training of athletes with Down Syndrome to enable their participation as gymnasts at the Special Olympics.	
Margaret Elizabeth Millard	For service to classical music, particularly as co-founder and Chairman of the Gold Coast Tropicarnival Eisteddfod and as President of the Gold Coast Branch of the Australian Society for Keyboard Music.	
Phillip John Mills	For service to the communities of the Torres Strait Islands and the Northern Peninsular area of Queensland through the development and implementation of a health strategy to address the unique health needs of the people of the region.	
Norman Miskelly	For service to the mining industry as a contributor to the work of the Joint Ore Reserves Committee in the formulation and promotion of public reporting standards for mineral resources and ore reserves, now known as the JORC Code.	
Guido Mohren	For service to the communities of Yarra Ranges and the City of Maroondah, particularly through the organisation and administration of citizenship ceremonies and support for a range of service, charitable and sporting organisations.	
Brian Monaghan	For service to the community of Stawell, particularly through the Rural Fire Brigade and the Stawell Agricultural Society.	
Ansa Gilchrist Moore	For service to the community through the Cairns Choral Society and SCOPE.	
Margery Pearl Moore	For service to the community as a contributor to social and recreational programmes for the Strathdon Community aged care facility.	
Dr Gerald John Morgan	For service to medicine, particularly in the provision of outreach palliative and aged care rehabilitation services in rural and remote areas of western New South Wales.	
Dr Francis Robert Moulds	For service to the community through the restoration of the Mount Macedon Memorial Cross, and to forestry, particularly as Chairman of the Senior Forests Commission of Victoria.	
John Terence Mullin	For service to catholic secondary education in the Port Pirie region, and to the wider community through Lions International.	
Robyn Eileen Murphy	For service to the community of Queanbeyan through local government and a range of sporting, senior citizen and health organisations.	
Dr Keith Murree-Allen	For service to the community of the Hunter Valley through the promotion of music and culture as an organist, musical director and chorister.	
Michael Mystakidis	For service to the Greek community, particularly through Greek language newspapers in Australia.	
Bruce Alexander Nairn	For service to golf as an administrator, both in New South Wales and nationally, and as Captain Manager of the Australian Amateur Team.	
Mary Adeline Nathan	For service to the community, particularly through the Moorabbin Hospital Ladies Auxiliary and the Bentleigh Branch of the Country Women's Association.	
Diana Dorothea Nelson	For service to the community of the Blue Mountains, particularly as a supporter of National Trust properties including the Norman Lindsay Gallery, 'Everglades' and the S H Ervin Gallery.	
Mervyn William Neubecker	For service to the community of Bundaberg through local government and participation in a range of local service and sporting groups.	
Dr Raymond Leonard Newcombe	For service to the medical profession and to the community, particularly through the executive of the Neurosurgical Society of Australasia.	
Thomas Richard Newhouse	For service to soccer as a coach, promoter and administrator, and through the development of the Baulkham Hills Soccer Club.	
Dr Mary Stewart Newlinds	For service to the community, particularly as an advocate for the conservation of local forest areas and for community consultation in the management of national parks and nature reserves.	
Ilma Adele Nicholson	For service to the welfare of veterans and their families through the New South Wales Division of the Royal Australian Air Force Association and the Ex-Servicewomen's Association, and to young women through the New South Wales Girls' Group of the Australian Air League.	
Henry Nissen	For service to the community, particularly disadvantaged youth in Melbourne, through programmes providing accommodation, food, material aid, sporting facilities, counselling and mediation to young people in crisis.	
John Leslie Noke	For service to the community through the Scouting movement, particularly as Warden of Gilwell Park.	
Christopher John Nunn	For service to sport as a coach, particularly to athletes with a disability, and for providing Australian Paralympic squads with elite sporting opportunities.	
Dr Peter Francis O'Brien	For service to the promotion of indigenous rights through the Australians for Native Title and Reconciliation (ANTaR) movement, to educational research in the area of early childhood education, and to adult education and training.	
Rosina O'Brien	For service to the community, particularly the aged in Mount Gravatt through Meals on Wheels.	
Theresa Louise O'Brien	For service to the community of the Hunter Valley region, particularly to children with disabilities and hearing impairments, as a 'signing choir' director, community columnist, radio commentator and provider of respite care.	
John Anthony O'Connor	For service to the welfare of veterans and their families in Tasmania, particularly as an executive member of the local branch of the Returned and Services League of Australia and the Returned and Services League of Australia Hostel for aged veterans.	
Margaret Joan O'Riley	For service to children with cancer through fundraising support for Camp Quality in South Australia.	
Sydney James Packham	For service to the food industry, particularly the development and promotion of bread making through the establishment of peak industry bodies, and to the community through a range of service, religious and cultural organisations.	
Thomas Albany Padbury	For service to the Australian sheep industry as a contributor to the improvement of merino genetics and as a stud master, judge and adviser to other breeders.	
Donald Maxwell Palmer	For service to veterans and their families as a benefactor to, fundraiser for and administrator of a number of ex-Service welfare organisations.	
Jean Margaret Paterson	For service to the community of Essendon, particularly through youth groups, including the Guiding and Scouting movements.	
John Paterson	For service to the community of Essendon through youth groups, particularly the Scouting movement.	
Pauline Perry	For service to people with disabilities as a benefactor, honorary coach, administrator and fundraiser for the Riding for the Disabled Association of Australia.	
George Thomas Phelps	For service to the community, particularly to people with disabilities through the provision of support services.	
Major John Vincent Phillips	For service to veterans and to the preservation of Australia's military heritage through the Royal Australian Army Pay Corps Historical Collection and Association.	
Glenda Philpott	For service to the community, particularly those with a fear of flying through the establishment and operation of the Fear of Flying Clinic, and through fundraising activities for the Sutherland Hospital and Camp Quality.	
Barry William Plane	For service to education as a teacher of design and technology, and to the community, particularly young people, through sailing and music activities.	
Gwen Eva Porter	For service to the community of Harrington through a range of organisations that promote community health and welfare programmes.	
Elaine Mary Postlethwaite	For service to the community of Marysville, particularly through educational, social welfare, service and church groups.	
Jack Joseph Prandolini	For service to lawn bowls as a player and administrator, and as a proponent of junior bowls.	
Dr Jeffrey James Prebble	For service to paediatric medicine as a practitioner, educator, and advocate for clinical care and practice standards for paediatrics.	
Mary Properjohn	For service to people with disabilities and their families, particularly through the fundraising activities and support services of the Spastic Centres of South Australia Foundation.	
Keith McKellar Queen	For service to the community, particularly the establishment of recreational facilities through the Blacktown Workers Club, and as a fundraiser for Westmead Hospital research.	
Wilfred Anthony Rafferty	For service to sport as an ultra runner and through the promotion of the benefits of physical fitness training.	
Vera Raymer	For service to veterans through the War Widows Guild of Australia, and to the community as a social worker and an advocate for the welfare of the aged.	
Barrie Roy Redman	For service to the community of Walkerville, particularly through the preservation and promotion of local history.	
Thomas William Reed	For service to the community, particularly through the Volunteer Marine Rescue Association of Western Australia.	
Edith Ellen Reeves	For service to the communities of Rappville and Casino, particularly through the Australian Red Cross.	
Cheryl Larraine Rixon	For service to the community as a foster parent.	
Charles Henry Roberts	For service to the welfare of veterans through support for the Gold Coast Ex-Prisoners of War Association, and to the community through sporting organisations.	
Yvonne Barbara Roberts	For service to the community, particularly women, through the National Council of Women of Tasmania and Caroline House.	
Ronald Charles Robertson-Swann	For service to the arts as a sculptor, teacher, mentor and advocate for sculpture, and to art education in Australia.	
Ewart Reginald Robson	For service to education through school sport programmes in New South Wales, particularly the administration of school Rugby Union football.	
Alexander Vernon Rose	For service to veterans and their families through the Mandurah Branch of the Western Australian Division of the Royal Australian Air Force Association, and to the community of Mandurah through a range of service, education, aged care and cultural organisations.	
Dr Solomon Rose	For service to veterans and their families through the Victorian Association for Jewish Ex-Servicemen and Women and as Director of the Sir Edward Dunlop Medical Research Foundation.	
Gwenda Ruth Rowe	For service to the community through compiling, recording and preserving the history of White Cliffs and the West Darling area of New South Wales.	
Ross McDonald Russell	For service to youth through the Scouting movement, and to the community through a range of health, disability and charitable organisations.	
Peter John Ryan	For service to medicine, particularly in the field of colorectal surgery, and in the prevention and management of road trauma.	
Robyn Veronica Ryan	For service to the community, particularly as a contributor to the musical and cultural life of the Hastings and Camden Haven districts.	
Thekla Olive Samuel	For service to swimming as an instructor and trainer of instructors, particularly through the NSW Swimming Association Learn to Swim programme.	
John Blennerhassett Savage	For service to sailing as a pioneer in the Australian boat-building industry and as an official measurer at national and international yachting events.	
Sava Savoff	For service to the Bulgarian community of South Australia, particularly through efforts to support and preserve cultural mores and traditions.	
Leslie Gustav Schulz	For service to the community of Temora, particularly through the Masonic Lodge and Rotary, and as a contributor to the preservation of local rural history.	
William Samuel Seay	For service to the community, particularly through surf lifesaving in the Illawarra region.	
Brian Leslie Slack	For service to equestrian sport, particularly through the organisation and management of three-day horse trials.	
Viktoras Sliteris	For service to the Lithuanian community in Sydney through a range of sporting, youth, recreational and cultural groups.	
James Christopher Sloman	For service to Olympic sport as a member of the Sydney Organising Committee for the Olympic Games and other committees that contributed to the success of the Games.	
Gladys Jean Smalley	For service to the aged community of Great Lakes, particularly through the development and administration of the Forster Tuncurry Senior Day Care Centre.	
Denise Winser Smith	For service to the community of the Hunter Valley, particularly as an educator of young people with disabilities and through the development of religious education programmes in local high schools.	
Kevin Smith	For service to sport in Newcastle, particularly to Rugby League football, and to surf lifesaving.	
Margery Smith	For service to the environment, particularly the Kosciuszko National Park, through the identification and preservation of the bio-diversity of the Park and the mapping and recording of its heritage sites.	
Ross Braham Smith	For service to sport, particularly at the Olympic level, through the provision of honorary physiotherapy services.	
Valerie Joan Smith	For service to the community of Newcastle, particularly to visually impaired people as a handicraft instructor, and to elderly people through musical therapy.	
William Joseph Smyth	For services to cricket as an umpire, trainer and administrator, and as a contributor to the development and rewriting of the Laws of Cricket.	
Ian Douglas Southwell	For service to sport in the Tamworth district as an administrator, coach, umpire and fundraiser, and to the community through local government.	
Jacques Spira	For service to the community, particularly through Rotary International, and to the arts through the Australian Ballet, the Australian Opera and the Sydney Symphony Orchestra.	
William Francis Staff	For service to the community through the Rylstone Historical and Dramatic Societies, the church and as a teacher.	
Dr George Meredith Stathers	For service to medicine, particularly in the field of geriatric medicine, as a leader and advocate for coordinated community health services for the aged.	
Robyn Lynette Stephens	For service to the community of Winton, particularly through the Outback Festival.	
John Dudley Stewart	For service to the communities of south east Melbourne through the Victoria State Emergency Service and a range of sporting, youth, civic and religious organisations.	
Marjorie Stiles	For service to the community of Lang Lang through fundraising for the Royal Children's Hospital and support for a range of local health, service and recreational bodies.	
Donald Edwin Stone	For service to youth, particularly through the Scouting movement, and to the community.	
Neil Joseph Street	For service to speedway motorcycle racing in Australia as a competitor, engineer, manager and mentor to young riders.	
Mary Patricia Stuart	For service to the communities of Young and Blayney, particularly through the Royal Far West Children's Health Scheme.	
Theresa Swanborough	For service to nursing, and to the community through programmes providing welfare and health care services to homeless people.	
Annie Irvine Swanson	For service to the community of Tullamore through women's service organisations.	
Colin Taylor	For service to the aged community of Chinchilla, particularly through the establishment and administration of Illoura Village.	
Daphne Lorna Taylor	For service to the aged community of Chinchilla, particularly through the establishment and administration of Illoura Village.	
Jacqueline Anne Taylor	For service to the visual arts, particularly through the Victorian Arts Centre.	
Dr Karin Tiedemann	For service to medicine, particularly in the field of paediatric oncology, through research, the establishment of a bone marrow transplant unit and the initiation of an umbilical cord blood bank for Victoria.	
John Desmond Tomes	For service to international seafarers through The Mission to Seafarers and to the Anglican Church in Tasmania.	
Mollie Constance Tomlin	For service to the Tasmanian community through the establishment and operation of Heartbeat Tasmania and through painting and sketching sites of historical and cultural interest.	
Peter Macquarie Toms	For service to the community of Newcastle, particularly through the Reserve Forces Day Newcastle Regional Council, and through local government.	
Sister Mary Patricia Trainor	For service to the communities of central western New South Wales, particularly people with disabilities, through the provision of chaplaincy services.	
Edward Mervyn Treagus	For service to the community, particularly the families of veterans, through participation in ex-Service welfare organisations.	
Cyril Percy Treasure	For service to the community of Cowra through local government, participation in a range of cultural, sporting and community groups, and in the preservation of local history.	
Robert Ross Tucker	For service to the Balwyn community, particularly veterans and their families through the Returned and Services League of Australia, to small business development, and to the extractive industry in Victoria.	
Llewelyn James Vale	For service to the community of the Shire of South Gippsland through Victorian water management organisations and a range of local educational, service, historical and financial groups.	
George Varlamos	For service to the community through fundraising and philanthropic activities in support of a number of health facilities, education, welfare and sporting organisations.	
Phyllis Shirley Walton	For service to the Central Coast community, particularly through the Anglican Parish of Gosford.	
Edwin John Walton	For service to the community of Gloucester, particularly young people, through initiating and supporting a range of educational, recreational, sporting and international exchange opportunities.	
Reginald Walter Ward	For service to youth, particularly in the Peakhurst area, through the Scouting movement.	
Rita Jean Ward	For service to the community, particularly through palliative care support groups.	
John Alexander Ware	For service to pharmacy and pharmaceutical administration by advancing the professional standards of pharmacy, and to the Seymour community through support for health and aged care facilities.	
Linda May Webb	For service to the Australian Capital Territory through public administration and social policy.	
Dr Warren Whiley	For service to the community of Cowra and district as a medical practitioner, particularly in the fields of obstetrics and gynaecology, and through a range of service, cultural and sporting organisations.	
Percy White	For service to the welfare of veterans and their families through participation in a range of ex-Service organisations, and as Deputy State Chief Marshal for the organisation of annual special commemorative days.	
Derek John Whitehead	For service to library and information services, particularly in the areas of acquisitions, collection management and the promotion of internet use, and to the development of multicultural library services in Australia.	
Linda May Whitham	For service to lawn bowls as a player, administrator and regional representative.	
John Charles Whittaker	For service to the development of tennis in New South Wales, and to the establishment of the Homebush Bay Tennis Centre.	
Robert Clarendon Whittle	For service to the community of Murwillumbah, particularly through the Murwillumbah Aero Club.	
Lesley Dawn Wilkinson	For service to the Tasmanian community, particularly through Parents Without Partners.	
Arthur Campbell Williams	For service to the Ballina community, particularly through the Ballina and Northern Rivers Co-operative Housing Society, and to the aged through the St Andrew's Retirement Village.	
Dr Geoffrey Arthur Williams	For service to conservation and the environment through research and promotion of Australia's animal and plant biodiversity, and through advice to local government on rainforest rehabilitation.	
Frank Andrew Willis	For service to the Crookwell community through local government and a range of service, sporting and aged care organisations.	
Glenmore Reginald Williss	For service to veterans and their families, particularly through the 2/27 Battalion Australian Infantry Ex-Servicemen's Association.	
The Reverend John William Woo	For service to the Anglican Church as a minister of religion, to multiculturalism and to the community.	
Heather Meryl Wood	For service to the community, particularly through the Australian Red Cross in the Padstow and Gosford areas.	
Danielle Anne Woodward	For service to sport, particularly Whitewater Slalom Canoeing, and to Olympic sport.	
Lloyd Cecil Worland	For service to the community of the Mornington Peninsula through a range of benevolent, health-related and musical organisations.	
Beverley Euphemia Wren	For service to hockey in the Lithgow region, particularly as an advocate for the sport and as a player, administrator, umpire, coach and fundraiser.	
The Honourable Kenneth Mackenzie Wright	For service to the community of Mildura as an elected representative at local and state government levels, as a supporter of health, youth and charitable organisations, and through the preservation of military history.	
Phyllis Jean Yates	For service to the arts in the Dandenong area, particularly through the Dandenong Festival of Music and Art for Youth.	
Cecily Veronica Yeo	For service to the community of Port Macquarie through local government and support for a range of ex-Service, health, aged care, women's and charitable organisations.	
David Alexander Young	For service to the conservation of Australian heritage sites, particularly as honorary Convenor of the Burra Charter Review Working Group.	

==== Military Division ====
Branch	Recipient	Notes
Navy	Warrant Officer David John Gray	
Navy	Chief Petty Officer Paul David Hayes	
Army	Warrant Officer Class Two Roger Michael Hyde	
Army	Major Denis Raymond Narramore	
Army	Major Ian Richard Parker	
Army	Chaplain Garry Allen Towle	
