= Ida West =

Australian Aboriginal elder and memoirist

Ida Amelia West AM (30 September 1919 – 8 September 2003) was an Australian Aboriginal elder who was better known as Aunty Ida. She was the author of Pride Against Prejudice.

== Biography ==
Ida West was born on Aboriginal reserve on Cape Barren Island on 30 September 1919 and moved with her family to Flinders Island as a young child. She was attended school in Lughrata.

In 1939 she married Marcus Sydney West. They had a daughter and two sons, but divorced in 1960.

West spent her life lobbying for better health services and land rights for the Aboriginal community in Tasmania. She was president of the Tasmanian Aboriginal Centre in Hobart.

In 1984 her memoir, Pride Against Prejudice: Reminiscences of a Tasmanian Aborigine, was published by Australian Institute of Aboriginal Studies. An extract from this memoir was included in the Anthology of Australian Aboriginal literature.

== Awards and recognition ==
West was awarded the Centenary Medal in 2001 for "services to social welfare, justice and reconciliation" and appointed a Member of the Order of Australia in the 2002 Australia Day Honours for "service as a leader of the Aboriginal community in Tasmania".

She received the Female Elder of the Year award at the 2002 NAIDOC Awards and was given a National Special Achievement Award at the 2003 NAIDOC ceremony. She was inducted onto the Tasmanian Honour Roll of Women in 2005, its inaugural year.

== Death and legacy ==
West died of cancer on 8 September 2003.

Speeches were made in Australian Federal Parliament on 10 September and in the Tasmanian Parliament on 23 and 30 September 2003, expressing condolences and recognising West's life and work.

The Department of Health in Tasmania established the Ida West Aboriginal Health Scholarship in 2003 in her honour.
