= Marjorie Parker =

Australian civic and political activist

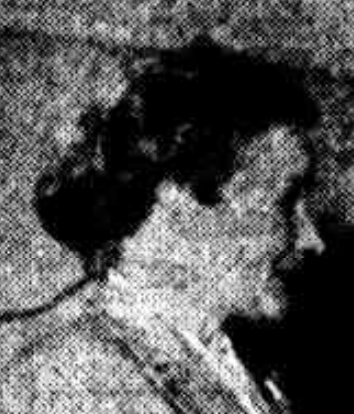
Dame Marjorie Parker (1900–1991)

Dame Marjorie Alice Collett Parker, DBE (née Shoppee; 30 June 1900 – 18 February 1991), known as Margot Parker, was an Australian civic and political activist who was created a Dame Commander of the Order of the British Empire in 1977.

== Family life ==
Parker was born in Ballarat as Marjorie Alice Collett Shoppee to salesman Walter Collett Shoppee and Victoria Alice (née Tilley). She attended Ballarat State School. She married James Maxwell Parker on 12 June 1926 and they had one child, a son, Alan. They moved to Launceston, Tasmania, in 1935.

== Career ==
From 1941 to 1969, she was an announcer and director of women's interests with 7EX Radio in Launceston. In 1954, Parker became the Public Relations Adviser for the Girl Guides Association, a position she held until 1968.

Beginning in 1961, she was president and organiser of the Launceston Red Cross Meals on Wheels for ten years. During this time, she was also Northern Regional President of the Australian Red Cross Society of Tasmania Division (1965–1968).

From 1964 to 1971, she joined the State Executive of the Tasmanian Division of the Miss Australia Quest. In 1964, she became State Executive and Public Relations Officer of the Tasmanian Good Neighbour Council, a post she held until 1970. From 1964 until 1968, Parker was also the vice-president of the United Nations Association in Launceston.

== Death ==
Predeceased by her husband (d. 1976), she died on 18 February 1991 at Launceston. She was survived by their son, her only child.

== Affiliations & legacy ==
Parker was a member of the Royal Commonwealth Society, Victoria League, Launceston of which she was president from 1966 to 1969.

The Society for the Care of Crippled Children made Parker a life member in 1973. She had been an executive member of the Society for many years.

In 1974, she was made a life member of the National Council of Australian Women, of which she had been deputy chairperson from 1960 to 1964.

== Awards & honours ==
- Parker was appointed a DBE in the New Year Honours List of 1977 for distinguished community service. She had been first honoured for her charitable work in Launceston, Tasmania when appointed an MBE in 1950 and promoted to OBE in the Birthday Honours List of 1970.
- The City of Launceston granted her the "Freedom of the City" in 1984; she was the first woman to be so honoured. She was inducted into the Launceston Hall of Fame in 2007.
- Parker was posthumously inducted to the Tasmanian Honour Roll of Women in 2007 for service to the community.
- She was the founder and President for 28 years of Launceston's first crèche, which has since been named in her honour.
- She is commemorated by the Dame Marjorie Parker Memorial Award at the University of Tasmania, funded by Soroptimist International of Launceston, of which she was president in 1951 and editor of the Tasmanian Soroptimist magazine in 1954. The award has helped over 30 women in their studies.
