= Margaret Findlay =

Australian architect

Margaret Keitha Findlay
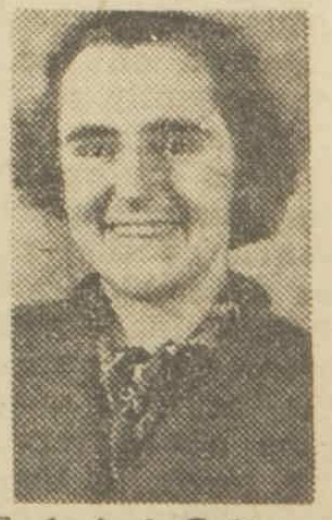
- Margaret Keitha Findlay, c. 1945
- Born: Margaret Keitha Findlay; 1916; Scottsdale, Tasmania, Australia
- Died: 2007 (aged 90–91)
- Education: Hobart Technical College; University of Sydney
- Occupations: Architect, town planner
- Awards: Tasmanian Honour Roll of Women (2011)
- Buildings: ANM Village, New Norfolk, Tasmania

Margaret Keitha Findlay (1916–2007), known as Keitha Findlay, was a pioneering Australian architect and town planner. She was the first woman in Tasmania to qualify as an associate of the Royal Australian Institute of Architects (RAIA) and the first woman to be registered as an architect in the state. Her career was marked by significant contributions to domestic architecture, town planning, and architectural education, particularly for women.

== Early life and education ==
Margaret Keitha Findlay was born in Scottsdale, Tasmania, in 1916. In the 1930s, her family relocated to New Norfolk, Tasmania, where she completed her secondary education.

Upon completing her schooling, Findlay pursued a career in architecture, an uncommon path for women at the time. She commenced an apprenticeship with Hobart architect A.T. Johnston while simultaneously undertaking architectural studies at Hobart Technical College. The college's program was then affiliated with the Sydney Technical College, requiring students to complete their final two years in Sydney. Findlay completed the five-year course and qualified for her architecture diploma in 1943.

== Career ==
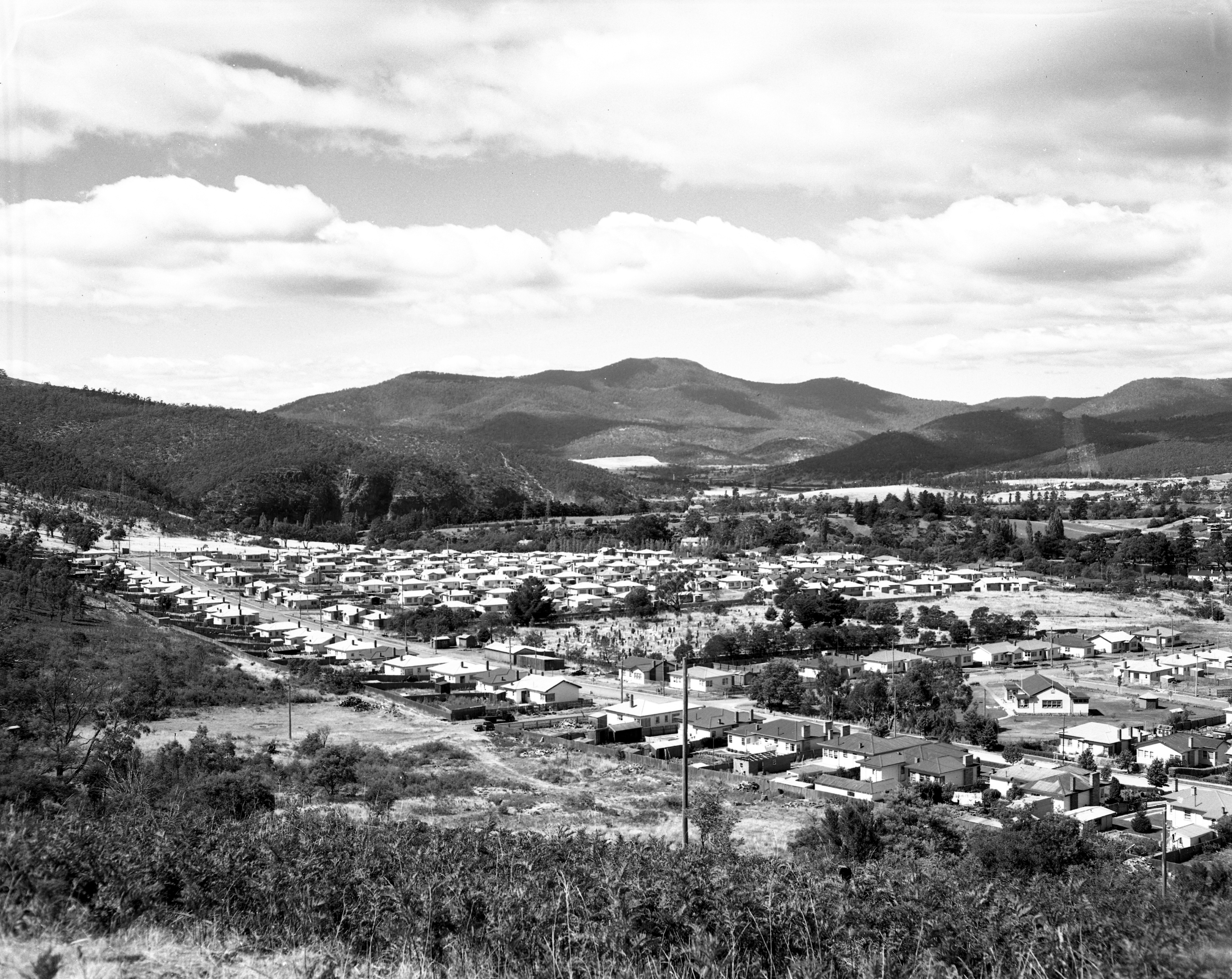
Findlay's workers’ housing at Boyer, built for employees of the ANM, c. 1952

Findlay's professional career began immediately after finishing her apprenticeship. She was employed as an architectural draftswoman for Australian Newsprint Mills (ANM) at Boyer, near New Norfolk. After only 15 months, the head architect left the company, and Findlay, at a young age, was appointed to the role. She assumed full architectural responsibility for the company's "town-site" project—a significant residential development designed to house workers and their families. In this capacity, Findlay personally designed at least 60 houses for ANM staff.

In 1943, Findlay achieved a major milestone by passing the qualifying exam to become an associate of the Royal Australian Institute of Architects, alongside one other Tasmanian, Charles Crawford. This made her the first woman in Tasmania to earn this professional qualification. She was also the first woman to be registered on the Roll of Architects for Tasmania.

Findlay became the first female architect employed by the Tasmanian Public Works Department in 1944. Her growing reputation led to a prestigious appointment in 1945 as an Instructor in Architectural Draughtsmanship at the University of Sydney. She was the first and, at that time, the only woman to hold such a position at the university's School of Architecture.

While teaching, Findlay pursued further studies in a field she was passionate about, graduating with a Diploma in Town and Country Planning from the University of Sydney in 1951. She remained a central figure in the architecture department at the university until her retirement in 1970.

== Architectural philosophy and advocacy ==
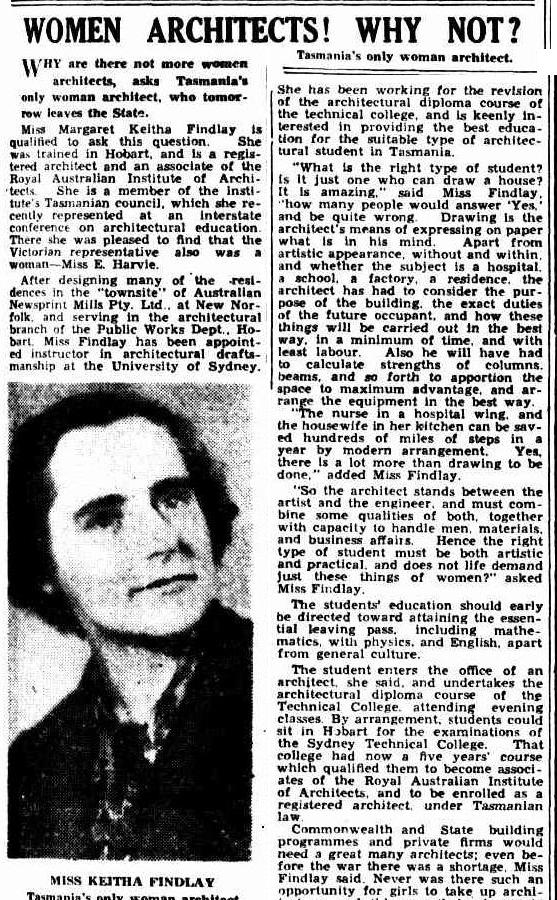
1945 article in The Mercury profiling Margaret Findlay, Tasmania’s first female architect.

Findlay was a vocal advocate for the role of women in architecture and for the importance of thoughtful domestic design. She believed that the post-war era presented a unique opportunity for women to enter the profession. In a 1945 interview with The Mercury, she famously stated:

"Never was there such an opportunity for girls to take up architecture, and this was their chance to... show the profession and the public what they could do."

She championed the idea that women brought a unique and essential perspective to home design. With a special emphasis on practical spaces like kitchens, she argued that the insights of women architects and housewives were crucial for creating functional and livable homes. "I think women architects and house-wives should have some say in the planning of the new homes," she told The Mercury in 1944. Throughout her career, Findlay consistently stressed the connection between well-designed domestic architecture and the health and happiness of women and their families.

Findlay also had a profound interest in urban design and expressed a strong belief in the "need for town planning." This interest was not just theoretical; it was evident in her work at the ANM town-site and her later formal studies in the field.

== Legacy ==
Margaret Findlay's legacy is multifaceted. As a pioneer, she broke down significant barriers for women in the male-dominated field of architecture in Australia. Her achievements provided a tangible example for future generations of female architects.

Her influence extended to architectural education. Findlay was instrumental in formulating an improved five-year architectural curriculum for Hobart Technical College. This new system was designed to ensure that its graduates would be qualified for associate membership of the RAIA and could become registered architects under Tasmanian law, thereby strengthening the profession within the state.

In recognition of her significant contributions to architecture and her pioneering role for women in the profession, Findlay was posthumously inducted into the Tasmanian Honour Roll of Women in 2011.

== Notable works ==
- ANM Village (now part of New Norfolk), Tasmania (c. 1942–1944): Findlay was the lead architect for this residential suburb, personally designing at least 60 individual houses for workers of the Australian Newsprint Mills.
