= Evelyn Masterman =

Australian librarian and peace activist

Evelyn Loois Masterman (31 May 1907 – 5 May 2014) was an Australian peace activist, teacher and librarian. Also known as Eve Masterman, she was appointed the first Tasmanian Parliamentary Librarian in 1945.

== Early life and education ==
Evelyn Loois Masterman was born on 31 May 1907 in Kent, England. She was the second daughter and youngest child of Lilla (née Osmond) and engineer Charles Edward Masterman. Her only sister was the writer, Nan Chauncy. The family moved to Hobart, Tasmania in 1912 where her father worked on diversion of the Hobart Rivulet.

Masterman was educated at St Michael's Collegiate School and was a prefect in 1925, her final year. She graduated from the University of Tasmania in 1933 with a Bachelor of Arts.

== Career ==
At the time of her father's death in 1938, Masterman was teaching French at Methodist Ladies' College in Adelaide. She subsequently studied librarianship in Melbourne before being appointed the first Tasmanian Parliamentary Librarian in 1945. She received the Sir John Morris Memorial Scholarship in 1958 and undertook a study tour of the parliamentary libraries in London and Washington.

Having joined the Women's International League for Peace and Freedom in the 1940s she served as delegate to conferences held in Geneva in 1968 and 1973.

== Awards and recognition ==
In the 1976 Queen's Birthday Honours, Masterman was appointed a Member of the Order of Australia for public service. She was awarded the Australian Peace Prize in 1986 and in 2001 a United Nations award.

She was inducted onto the Tasmanian Honour Roll of Women in recognition of her human rights work in 2009.

== Death and legacy ==
Masterman died on 5 May 2014. The Tasmanian Branch of the Women's International League for Peace and Freedom inaugurated the Eve Masterman Peace Poetry Prize in her honour.

Her contribution to the development of the International Peace Park in Berriedale, Tasmania is memorialised by a plaque.
