= Tony Beddison =

Australian businessman (1948–2020)

Anthony John Beddison AC (3 October 1948 – 14 January 2020) was an Australian businessman and philanthropist, who was founder and chairman of the Beddison Group, a workforce recruitment and consultancy service.

== Early life and career ==
Beddison was born in 1948, and educated at Caulfield Grammar School. His first job was as a trainee for BP from 1966 to 1969. He served in the Australian Army from 1969 to 1972, reaching the rank of lieutenant. He worked as a management consultant in Europe until 1974, when he joined Drake International as a manager.

== Business career ==
In 1977, Beddison founded SACS Consulting, a consulting firm specialising in organisational psychology. SACS merged with other companies over the next twenty years, including Hoban Recruitment and Clicks IT Recruitment.

== Philanthropy and directorships ==
From the mid-1990s, Beddison served on the boards and committees of several organisations, sometimes as chairman or director. These included the committee of the FINA World Aquatics Championships Corporation from 2005 to 2007, the Centenary of Federation Victorian committee (1998–2000), the Moonee Valley Racing Club committee (1998–2009), and the council of the Australian War Memorial. He was chairman of the Australia Day Committee (1999–2004), the Royal Children's Hospital (2004–2013), and The Prince's Charities Australia (2013–2016); and director of the Murdoch Children's Research Institute (2004–2013) and the Australian War Memorial ANZAC Foundation (from 2011 until his death in 2020).

== Honours ==
Beddison was appointed as an Officer of the Order of Australia in the 2002 Australia Day Honours. He was upgraded to Companion of the Order at the Queen's Birthday Honours in 2016.
