= Alice Christina Irvine =

Australian domestic science teacher and cookery book author

- Born: 12 May 1879; Mathinna, Tasmania, Australia
- Died: 12 November 1940 (aged 61); South Hobart, Tasmania, Australia
- Occupation: Domestic science teacher; cookery book author
- Notable works: Central Cookery Book
- Notable awards: Tasmanian Honour Roll of Women

Alice Christina Irvine (12 May 1879 – 12 November 1940) was an Australian domestic science teacher and author of the Central Cookery Book.

== Life ==
Irvine was the third daughter of Peter and Flora (née McLaurin) Irvine. She was born on 12 May 1879 in Mathinna, Tasmania where her father was manager of a gold mine. She completed her schooling at Mangana State School and was employed as a monitor at Mathinna School in April 1897. She moved to West Zeehan State School in 1898 and then Burnie in 1902.

In 1906 the Tasmanian education department sent her and fellow teacher Frances A Stevenson to the Continuation School in Melbourne run by Flora Pell to learn the curriculum and teaching methods in readiness for the opening of cookery schools in Hobart and Launceston. Irvine took charge of the Launceston Cookery School from its opening in October 1907. She taught 20 girls from local schools one day a week for six months.

Irvine was head of the Launceston Cookery School from 1907 until it was incorporated into Launceston High School in 1921. She did, however, spend 1914 and 1915 at the Hobart Cookery School. In 1925 she was appointed to head teacher for domestic science at Launceston High, before spending 1926 in Melbourne at the Emily McPherson College of Domestic Economy. In 1927 she moved to Hobart High School as head of domestic science, remaining there until her death.

Irvine is best known as author of the Central Cookery Book. First published in 1930, it was used as a textbook in domestic science classes around Tasmania. Now in its 16th or 17th edition, it became a best seller at The Book Cellar in Campbell Town, Tasmania in 2020 due to COVID-19 lockdowns.

In 1934 Irvine was invited to speak on cookery on Hobart's 7ZL and her talks became a regular feature. In May 1939 she had a weekly time-slot for Cookery, which she continued until July 1940.

Irvine's contribution to education was recognised when she was posthumously inducted onto the Tasmanian Honour Roll of Women in 2009.

Irvine died on 12 November 1940 in hospital in South Hobart. She was buried at Fingal, Tasmania, following a Presbyterian service at the graveside.
