= 1976 Queen's Birthday Honours (Australia) =

Annual honours in Australia

The Queen's Birthday Honours 1976 for Australia were appointments to recognise and reward good works by citizens of Australia and other nations that contribute to Australia. The Birthday Honours are awarded as part of the Queen's Official Birthday celebrations and were announced on 12 June 1976 in Australia.

The recipients of honours are displayed as they were styled before their new honour and arranged by honour with grades and then divisions i.e. Civil, Diplomatic and Military as appropriate.

== Order of Australia ==
The following appointments were made for the Order of Australia.

=== Knight (AK) ===
==== General Division ====
- The Right Honourable Sir Robert Gordon Menzies KT PC CH – For extraordinary and pre-eminent achievement and merit in the field of government.

=== Companion (AC) ===
==== General Division ====
- Professor Bernard Yarnton Mills – For eminent achievement and merit of the highest degree to science, particularly in the field of radio-astronomy.

=== Officer (AO) ===
==== General Division ====
- Professor Richard Roderick Andrew – For distinguished service of a high degree in the field of medical research.
- Thomas Bevan Chandos Bell – For distinguished service of a high degree in the field of commerce and international relations.
- Gilbert John Brealey – For distinguished service of a high degree to the film industry.
- Geoffrey Piers Henry Dutton – For distinguished service of a high degree in the field of literature.
- Dr Norman Henry Fisher – For distinguished service of a high degree to science, particularly in the field of geology.
- John Vincent Howell – For distinguished service of a high degree to the community.
- Right Reverend Francis Oag Hulme-Moir – For distinguished service of a high degree to religion and the welfare of members of the armed forces.
- Frederick Vernon Kellow – For distinguished service of a high degree to commerce and the community.
- Dr Charles Henry Brian Priestley – For distinguished service of a high degree in the field of science.
- Colin Grassie Rankin – For distinguished service of a high degree in the field of hospital administration.
- Eileen Vimy Wilhelm – For distinguished service of a high degree in the field of community and social welfare.

==== Military Division ====
For distinguished service in responsible positions

- Air Vice Marshal Lyndon Spencer Compton OBE
- Chaplain General John Aloysius Morgan ED
- Air Vice Marshal Neville McNamara CBE AFC
- Rear Admiral Anthony Synnot
- Rear Admiral G J Willis
- Major General Robert Peter Woollard

=== Member (AM) ===
==== General Division ====
- Leslie Nicholas Aris – For services to the community.
- Richard Albert Bataille – For public service to the community of Norfolk Island.
- Alan Robert Bellhouse – For services to the community, particularly in the field of music.
- Elzio Luciano Bini – For services to the community and in the field of international relations.
- Charles Kasiel Bliss – For services to the community, particularly to handicapped children.
- John Francis Booth – For services to the community.
- Dr Nancy Tyson Burbidge – For services to botanical science.
- Lt Col Sister Clarice Esther Cavanagh – For services to nursing.
- Rev William George Coughlan – For services in the field of community and social welfare.
- Arthur Edmund Debenham – For services in the legal profession.
- Kurt Defris – For services to sport.
- Gordon Frederick Dell – For services to the community.
- Shirley Newsome Dibden – For services to the community, particularly in the field of social welfare.
- Jack Gerke – For services to the welfare of ex-service men and women.
- Oscar Alphons Guth – For services to the arts.
- Dr Hazel Yvonne Halse – For services to the community, particularly in the field of medical care.
- Robert Greig Hicks, MBE – For services to the community.
- Ian Melville Jolley – For services to the community.
- Ellen Violet Jordan – For services to local government.
- Vincent (Tommy) Lingiari – For services to the Aboriginal community.
- Cr Robert Oliver Luxford – For services to the community.
- Eva Bessie Marcus – For services to the arts.
- Evelyn Loois Masterman – For public service.
- Elsie Needham – For services to migrants, particularly in the field of social welfare.
- Catherine Alexis Nicholls – For services to conservation.
- Horace Donough O'Brien – For services in the field of medicine.
- Dr Thomas Athol Pressley – For services to science, particularly in the field of textile research.
- Reginald F Quartly – For services in the field of the performing arts.
- Margaret Peggy Raward – For services to the performing arts, particularly in the field of music.
- Philip Wynnes Reilly – For services to the trade union movement.
- John R Sainsbury – For public service.
- Yvonne Eliza Stewart – For services to the community, particularly in the field of social welfare.
- Alwyn Creighton Thomas – For services to industry.
- Walter George Trapnell – For services to horticulture.
- Irene Hazel Trevor – For services to the community, particularly aged and invalid pensioners.
- Eric George Webster – For services to sport and the community.

==== Military Division ====
For exceptional service or performance of duty.

- Lieutenant Colonel C. J. Cattenach
- Colonel R. S. Deacon
- Wing Commander A. L. Furniss
- Colonel W. J. S. Gordon
- Group Captain E. M. Johnston
- Senior Chaplain F. Lyons, RAN
- Lieutenant Colonel D. J. Mealey
- Commander N. S. Merrifield, RAN
- Lieutenant Colonel J. O'Neill
- Colonel K. P. Outridge
- Commander P. J. Shelvin, RAN
- Lieutenant Colonel R. T. Smith
- Commander F. G. Swindells, RAN
- Colonel K. E. Walsh, ED
