= Tasmanian Honour Roll of Women =

The State Government of Tasmania in Australia established the Tasmanian Honour Roll of Women in 2005 to recognise Tasmanian women who have been distinguished in their contributions to the State. In 2021 Martine Delaney became the first openly transgender woman into the Honour Roll.

The Honour Roll is generated from community involvement in the discovery of women's historical and contemporary contributions to Tasmania, to honour them and to ensure their memory is not lost.

Inductees are listed below by year, and for other formats and biographies of the individual inductees see the Tasmanian State Government Honour Roll of Women website. After 2009 announcements of additional names were made biannually.

== 2025 ==
The 2025 inductees were announced on 7 March by the Minister for Women, Jo Palmer:

- Ballard, Wafa (for service to community, advocacy and inclusion; multicultural affairs)
- Campbell, Rees (for service to environment; education; community, advocacy and inclusion)
- Carlton OAM, Melissa Paula (for service to sport and recreation; community, advocacy and inclusion)
- Chong FAICD, Heather (for service to government public service and politics; volunteering)
- Drummond Cawthon, Kelly (for service to arts or media; community, advocacy and inclusion)
- Girl Guides Tasmania (for service to community, advocacy and inclusion; education and training)
- Haigh ASM, Simone (for service to emergency services; workplace relations)
- Hallam, Dorothy (for service to arts or media; cultural heritage)
- Hobart Women's Shelter (for service to community, advocacy and inclusion; prevention of family violence)
- Huett, Judy (for service to human rights, justice and corrections, community, advocacy and inclusion)
- Kille AM, Dr Mary Lindsay (for service to health; human rights, justice)
- Landowski, Dr Lila (for service to science; education; community, advocacy and inclusion)
- Lester, Professor Elizabeth (Libby) (for service to education and training; arts or media)
- McCuaig, Mary Ann (for service to environment; government; community, advocacy and inclusion)
- Milne AO, Christine (for service to environment; government, public services and politics)
- Morice, Deb (for service to agriculture, primary industries; community, advocacy and inclusion)
- Munting, Katrina (for service to community, advocacy and inclusion; human rights, justice)
- Nettlefold, Dr Jocelyn (for service to arts or media; government, public services and politics)
- Pecl AM, Professor Gretta (for service to science, technology; environment)
- Polley OAM, Kim Petrina (for service to government public service and politics; community, advocacy and inclusion)
- Purnell OAM, Vicki May (for service to health; community, advocacy and inclusion; volunteering)
- Raake, Maria (for service to health; community, advocacy and inclusion)
- Scholes, Katherine (for service to arts or media; literature and education)
- Sumner, Cate (for service to human rights, justice; prevention of family violence)
- Swain AM, Elizabeth Jean (for service to engineering; community, advocacy and inclusion)
- Tame, Grace Lauren (for service to human rights, justice; community, advocacy and inclusion)
- Weindorfer, Kate Julia (for service to environment; tourism)
- Wise OAM, Sally (for service to tourism; volunteering)
- Women's Legal Service Tasmania (WLST) (for service to community, advocacy and inclusion; prevention of family violence)

== 2023 ==
- Alexander, Alison (for service to cultural heritage; literature)
- Adam-Smith, Patricia (Patsy) OBE AO (for services to cultural heritage; literature)
- Barwick, Heather JP (for service to community, advocacy and inclusion; government and public services)
- Bovill, Jane (for service to education and training)
- Baker, Barbara (Barb) (for service to health, community, advocacy and inclusion)
- Cowle, Gertrude (for service to business; community advocacy and inclusion)
- Cairns, Virginia (for service to arts; education; sport and recreation; community service)
- Cross, Carolyn (for service to arts; education)
- Duniam, Dr Mary (for service to community, advocacy and inclusion; government and public service)
- Dawkins, Andrea (for service to community, advocacy and inclusion; government and public services)
- Doddridge, Elizabeth (Libby) (for service to education and training; community)
- Escott, Ros (for service to volunteering and health)
- Fordyce, Kathryn (for service to community, advocacy and inclusion; volunteering)
- Gates, Dr Genevieve (for service to education and training; environment; science and research)
- Green, Hyacinth (for service to community, advocacy and inclusion)
- Holmdahl, Christina (for service to arts and media; community, advocacy and inclusion; literature; government, public services and politics; volunteering)
- Harris, Dr Rebecca (for service to education; science and research; environment)
- Hesketh, Gwendoline (Gwen) MBE (for service to community, advocacy and inclusion; health; human rights, justice; volunteering)
- Little, Elizabeth (Liz) (for service to community, advocacy and inclusion, government, public services; human rights; justice; prevention of family violence)
- Melbourne-Thomas, Jess (for service to the environment; science and research)
- Machen, Mary (for service to arts and media; community advocacy and inclusion; literature; volunteering)
- Maxwell, May MBE (for service to arts; community, advocacy and inclusion; government and public service; volunteering)
- Munday, Jessica (for service to community, advocacy and inclusion; human rights and justice)
- Mountney, Glenda (for service to volunteering)
- McAlpine, Colette (for service to cultural heritage; arts and media; community advocacy and inclusion; volunteering)
- Nolan, Susan (for service to childcare; education and training; government and public services; volunteering)
- Payne, Barbara OBE AM (for service to community; advocacy and inclusion; education; government and public services)
- Pockett, Teresa (for service to education and training; community advocacy and inclusion)
- Rooke, Jessie (for service to community, advocacy and inclusion; government, public services and politics; human rights)
- Rodway, Florence (for service to arts and cultural heritage)
- Ritchie, Allison (for service to community, advocacy, and inclusion; government and public services; human rights; sport and recreation)
- Selby, Jill (for service to childcare; community advocacy and inclusion; education and training; volunteering)
- Soroptimist International of Launceston (for service to community, advocacy and inclusion; education; environment; health; human rights; prevention of family violence; volunteering)
- Wriedt, Paula (for service to community, advocacy and inclusion; education and training; government, public services and politics)
- Wylie, Kristen (for service to community, advocacy and inclusion; education; government and public services; human rights; prevention of family violence)
- Young, Patricia (for service to volunteering)

== 2021 ==
- Cox, Suzanne Gertrude AM (for service to health, volunteering, arts and media, and Aboriginal and Torres Strait Islander Affairs)
- Delaney, Martine (for service to human rights, justice and corrections, community advocacy and inclusion, and sport and recreation)
- Dean, Mary Clarrissa (for service to business, industry and workplace relations, community advocacy and inclusion, education and training, environment, and volunteering)
- Eldridge, Margaret Ursula AM (for service to multicultural affairs, community advocacy and inclusion, education and training, and volunteering)
- Fahlborg, Honora (Maud) (for service to community advocacy and inclusion, education and training, health, and human rights, Justice and Corrections)
- Goodwin, Dr Vanessa (for service to Public Services and Politics, human rights, Justice, and Corrections, community advocacy and inclusion, arts and media)
- Healey, Janine (for service to arts and media, Business, Industry and Workplace Relations, community advocacy and inclusion, human rights, Justice and Corrections, agriculture/Primary Industries, Tourism, and Volunteering)
- Heyward, Roseanne (for service to Public Services and Politics, community advocacy and inclusion, environment, and Volunteering)
- Holman, Beverley Helen (for service to community advocacy and inclusion)
- Kennedy, Lorna Doone Pleasance AO (for service to community advocacy and inclusion, Public Services and Politics, Tourism, Volunteering, health, and arts and media)
- Lewis, Rosalind Mary (for service to community advocacy and inclusion, education and training, Multicultural Affairs, human rights, and the environment)
- Merridew, Sarah (for service to Business, Industry and Workplace Relations, community advocacy and inclusion)
- Pennicott, Edna Florence OAM (for service to community advocacy and inclusion)
- Poulett-Harris, Harriet (Lily) (for service to sport and recreation)
- Presentation Sisters Tasmania (for service to education and training)
- Roberts, Diana Ruth (for service to community advocacy and inclusion)
- Radcliffe, Dora Christine (for service to tourism)
- Stafford, Jean Honora (for services to arts and media)
- Tasmanian Women's Amateur Athletics Association (for service to Sport and Recreation)
- Walker, Lorraine Faye (for service to community advocacy and inclusion)
- Zonta International District 23, Area 5 (for service to volunteering, arts and media, human rights, justice and corrections, prevention of domestic and family violence, community advocacy and inclusion)

== 2019 ==
- Adams, Donna Louise (for service to the community, police, emergency services and defence)
- Denne, Josephine (for service to the community)
- Duncombe, Kathy (for service to the community)
- Durrani, Hina (for service to multicultural affairs)
- Edwards, Carole Jacqueline (for service to community, environment, local government and planning, architecture and engineering)
- Ellis, Neroli (for service to health and community)
- Flower, Glynis (for service to community)
- Gale, Jenny (for service to Government)
- Gaskell, Siobhan (for service to community, education and training and government)
- Giudici, Rossalyn (for service to community)
- Holderness-Roddam, Myrtle (Georgie) (for service to education and training)
- Jackson, Frances Isabel (for service to sport and recreation)
- Kelly, Diane Lesley OAM (for service to the community, sport and recreation)
- Kerslake, Marjory (for service to education and training, and sport and recreation)
- McNamara, Catherine (for service to police, emergency services and defence)
- Millar, Ann Janette (for service to the community)
- Miller, Maureen (for service to community, arts or media and health)
- Murphy, Dianne (for service to community)
- National Council of Women (for service to community)
- O'Neill, Lindy (for service to community, human rights, justice, education and training)
- Overeem, Alison (for services to the community, education and training and cultural heritage)
- Perry, Pauline OAM (for service to community and sport and recreation)
- Ray, Jean Diamond (for service to community)
- Roe, Kim (for service to the arts or media)
- Seagram, Kim (for service to business or industry)
- Sharpe, Moya (for service to education and training)
- Smith, Bronilyn (for service to education and training, community and sport and recreation)
- Speers, Sandra Michelle (for service to sport and recreation)
- Tennent, Shan (for service to justice and human rights)
- Travers, Judith (Judy) Ellen (for service to education and training)

== 2017 ==
- Bender, Frances (for service to business or industry)
- Bird, Margaret (for community service)
- Brock, Cynthia (for services to education and training)
- Bushby, Hazel (Elaine) (for community service)
- Clementson, Lesley Ann (for science or medicine)
- Cameron, Mel (for services to business, industry or tourism)
- Female Convicts Research Centre (for community service, education and training, justice and tourism)
- Fenton, Karla (for service to science or medicine)
- Flint, Deirdre OAM (for service to government)
- Friedersdorff, Alywn (for community service, education and training and government)
- Gillam, Liz (for service to government)
- Grant, Joan (for community service, education and training)
- Giddings, Lara (for service to government)
- Hore, Kerry (for service to sport and recreation)
- Hickey, Sue (for service to government, business and industry)
- Howard, Pat AM (for Human Rights)
- Linegar, Karen (for service to health)
- Mujkic, Ljiljana (for community service and human rights)
- Nichols, Verna (for service to Aboriginal affairs, arts or media, education and training and community service.)
- Snowden, Dianne (for service to education and training)
- Triffitt, Deidre (for community service)
- White, Kathleen (Betty) (for community service)

== 2015 ==
- Andrew, Wendy (for service to environment, Local Government, Planning, Engineering and Architecture)
- Burgess, Mavis (for community Service)
- Bardenhagen, Marita (for service to arts or Media, health, Planning, Engineering or Architecture)
- Cornish, Ros (for service to community)
- Coleman, Rosemary (for service to sport and recreation)
- Clarke, Maureen (for service to health)
- Cumming, Elsie (for community Service and health)
- Clark, Linda (for service to arts or Media, Science and Medicine)
- Davies, Margaret (for service to Science)
- Eden, Elizabeth (for service to the arts or Media)
- Furmage, Rhyllis (for service to the community)
- Greeno, Lola (for service to Aboriginal Affairs and the arts)
- Goodsell, Ros (for community Service, education and training and Multicultural Affairs)
- Kay, Mary (for community Service)
- Miller, Julie (for community Service)
- Madsen, Roz (for community Service, education and training and Human Rights)
- Moore, Audrey (for Human Rights)
- Midlands Multi-Purpose health Centre Auxiliary, Oatlands (for service to health and community Service)
- Payne, Ellen (for service to the arts)
- Rimes, Julie (for service to education and training)
- Russell, Loris (for service to education and training)
- Smith, Sue (for service to Government)
- Soroptimist International of Circular Head (for service to health and Human Rights)
- Symons, Janet (for service to the community)
- Smart, Margot (for service to Business or Industry, community Service and Local Government)
- Smith, Ann (for service to the community)

== 2013 ==
- Andrews, Gloria (for service to Aboriginal Affairs)
- Australian Women's Army Service (Tasmanian Division) (for services to Defence)
- Bonham, Prudence (Pru) (for service to the community, Local Government and Science)
- Barnsley, Kathryn (for service to health)
- Bartkevicius, Margaret (for service to Education, Training and the community)
- Chapman, Sister Phillipa (for service to the community)
- Cleaver, Judith (for service to the community)
- Country Women's Association of Tasmania (for service to the community)
- Crotty, Anna (for service to Human Rights)
- De Williams, Deborah (for service to the community, sport and recreation)
- Denholm, Fay (for service to sport and recreation)
- Griffiths, Maxine (for service to Human Rights)
- Gourlay (Cawley), Helen (for service to sport and recreation)
- Hamer, Jennifer (Jenny) (for service to the community)
- Haswell, Emma (for service to the community)
- Henri, Christina (for service to the arts)
- Hine, Olive Rosalie (for service to the community)
- Hughes, Renate (for service to health and the community)
- Haines, Susan (for service to health and Defence)
- Jamieson, Norma (for service to health and the community)
- Mayhead, Betty (for service to the community)
- Murray, Dorothy (for service to Aboriginal Affairs)
- Orr, Elizabeth (Lizzie) (for service to health and Defence)
- Phong, Kim (for service to Multicultural Affairs)
- Roberts, Yvonne (Bonnie) (for service to the community)
- Shelley, Pauline (for service to the community)
- Truchanas, Melva (for service to the environment)
- Tasmanian Women in agriculture (for service to agriculture)
- Waddle, Annette (for service to Government)

== 2011 ==
- Australian Women's Land Army (Tasmanian Division) (for service to Defence)
- Blackburn, Susan Irene (for service to Science)
- Coy, Johanna (for service to health)
- Clark, Elizabeth Mabel (for service to the community)
- Curtain, Constance (Connie) Marie (for service to the community)
- Denman, Kay Janet (for service to the community)
- Findlay, Margaret Keitha (for service to Architecture)
- Fulton, Amabel (for service to agriculture)
- Fulton, Elizabeth (Beth) Ann (for service to Science, service to the environment)
- Greeno, Dulcie (for service to Aboriginal Affairs, service to the arts)
- Gee, Helen (for service to the environment)
- Hall, Karen Naree (for service to Business)
- Hobart Women's health Centre (for service to health, service to Human Rights)
- Johnson, Eileen (for service to education and training)
- Knowles, Mary Carmel (for service to the community)
- Luckman, Jessie Sheila (for service to the environment, service to the arts)
- Lodder, Mary (for service to Cultural Heritage)
- Maddox, Austra (for service to Human Rights)
- Maddock, Beatrice (Bea) Louise (for service to the arts)
- Mack, Margaret Annette Rose (for service to the community, service to health)
- Napier, Suzanne (Sue) Deidre (for service to Government)
- Putt, Margaret (Peg) Ann (for service to the environment)
- Ratcliff, Patricia Margaret Fitgerald OAM (for service to Cultural Heritage)
- Schneiders, Kim Michelle (for service to the arts)
- Webb, Joan (for service to the arts, service to the community)
- Wijffels, Susan Elizabeth Anne (for service to Science)

== 2009 ==
- Barnes, Vera Florence OAM (for service to the community)
- Baker, Florence Jean (for service to Defence)
- Colville, Margaret Jean (for service to the community)
- Crisp, Mary Murdoch (for service to the community)
- Frohmader, Carolyn Patricia (for service to Human Rights)
- French, Sandra Anne (for service to the community)
- Fullard, Corrie Lavinia (for service to the arts, service to Aboriginal Affairs, service to education and training)
- Fitzallen, Lilah Maud (for service to the community)
- Greig, Annie (for service to the arts)
- Hodgetts, Diana (for service to Human Rights)
- Irvine, Alice Christina (for service to education and training)
- Jackson, Judith (Judy) Louise (for service to Government, service to Human Rights)
- Jackson, Marilyne Jayne (for service to sport and recreation)
- Kelly, Merma (for service to Multicultural Affairs)
- Masterman, Evelyn (Eve) Loois (for service to Human Rights)
- Mead, Isabella Jane (for service to Cultural Heritage)
- Miller, Dame Mabel Flora DBE (for service to Government, service to the community)
- Park, Priscilla OAM (for service to the environment)
- Rooney, Marjorie Lorna MBE (for service to education and training)
- Sparkes, (Jan) Maria (for service to the community)
- Myrtle Searle (for service to health)
- Swan, Louisa (for service to the arts)
- Shields, Ethnee Patricia AM (for service to education and training)
- Smit, Nellie (Nel) Suzanna (for service to education and training)
- Weeks, Josephine (Jo) Frances Emily (for service to the community)
- Wellard, Emmeline Louisa (for service to health, service to Defence)
- Watson, Lilian Delsa (for service to Cultural Heritage)
- Willson, Barbara Brenda (for service to the community)
- Wayn, Amelia Lucy MBE (for service to the Cultural Heritage)

== 2008 ==
- Bennett, Jane (for service to agriculture)
- Barron, Elizabeth Lauretta OAM (for service to health)
- Blackburn, Elizabeth Helen (for service to Science)
- Berger, Shirley May (for service to Emergency Services)
- Burns, Kathryn Ann (for service to health, service to the community)
- Braham (Beeton Braham), Elizabeth (for service to Human Rights)
- Cavanagh-Russell, Megan (for service to education and training)
- Carswell, Joan (for service to sport and recreation)
- Drake, Anne Marie (for service to the community)
- Degrassi, Kerry (for service to the community)
- Dennis, Margaret Linda (for service to health, service to the community)
- Frohmader, Wendy Noeline (for service to education and training)
- Fernon, Catherine (for service to the community)
- Geard, Helen Edith (for service to the community, service to the environment)
- Goss, Suzanne (Sue) (for service to the community)
- Hull, Patricia Joan (Pat) (for service to the community)
- Kelly, Joan Phyllis (for service to the arts)
- McShane, Clare Elizabeth (for service to agriculture)
- Pitchford, Phyllis (Aunty Phyllis) (for service to Aboriginal Affairs, service to the arts)
- Piemontese, Jenny Kay (for service to the community)
- Pearce, Dorothy MBE (for service to the community)
- Paterson, Ruth Joan (for service to agriculture)
- Rout, Ettie Annie (for service to health)
- Rawson, Joan Gladys BEM (for service to the community)
- Rowntree, Amy OBE (for service to education and training, service to the arts)
- Sing, Margaret Anne (for service to Human Rights)
- Stanton, Catherine (Kate) Marie (for service to sport and recreation)
- Steele, Anne Mary (for service to sport and recreation)

== 2007 ==
- Andersch, Lynette (Lyn) Anne (for service to Multicultural Affairs)
- Barnett, Barbara (for service to the community, service to health)
- Burgess, Jean Heather (for Service to the community)
- Barron, Jennifer (Jen) (for service to the community)
- Burbury, Marion (Jill) (for service to the community)
- Bennett, Elizabeth Gay (Beth) (for service to the community)
- Blizzard, Jan Mary (for service to the community, service to Government)
- Binns, Sister Marlene (for service to the community)
- Campbell, Mary (for service to the community)
- Grant, Linley OAM (for service to the community)
- Grey, Carol Aileen (for service to the community)
- Hine, Vera Margaret (for service to the community)
- Hill, Mary OAM (for service to education and training)
- Kent, Julie (for service to sport and recreation)
- Kerslake, Irene Mary (for service to education and training)
- Matson-Green, Vicki maikutena (for service to Aboriginal Affairs)
- McGarry, Anne OAM (for service to the arts, service to education and training)
- McConnon, Joyce Elaine OAM (for service to the community)
- Osborne, Leila (Margaret) OAM (for service to the community, service to sport and recreation)
- O'Connor, Christine (for service to the community)
- O'Toole, Miriam Evelyn Fairham OBE (for service to the community)
- Parker, Dame Marjorie Alice Collett DBE (for service to the community)
- Perkins, Jean (for service to the community, service to Government)
- Peardon, Annette Elizabeth (for service to Aboriginal Affairs)
- Reid, Sandra (for service to education and training)
- Vickers, Carlene (for service to the arts)
- Walley, Janet (Jan) OAM (for service to sport and recreation)

== 2006 ==
- Ahearn, Patricia (Pat) (for service to the community, service to education and training)
- Buckingham, Beverley (Bev) (for service to sport and recreation)
- Brown, Geraldine Mary (for service to sport and recreation)
- Beven, Mavis (for service to the arts)
- Bladel, Frances (Fran) (for service to Government, service to education and training, service to the community)
- Cowen, Donna (for service to the community)
- Coaldrake, Maida (for service to education and training)
- Cameron, Mary AM (for service to Science)
- Campbell, Enid AC OBE (for service to education and training)
- Cameron, Patricia (Aunty Patsy) (for service to education and training, service to Aboriginal Affairs)
- Deacon, Clare MM (for service to health)
- Edwards, Marie (for service to the arts)
- Espie, Nellie Jane (Nell) AM (for service to health, service to Veterans)
- Fox, Mary Elizabeth Gertrude MBE (for service to education and training, service for sport and recreation)
- Farrell, Lynne (for service to Science)
- Goiser, Stella (for service to the community, service to Multicultural Affairs)
- Given, Sheila AM (for service to education and training)
- Gibson, Heather (for service to Medicine)
- Giordano, Margaret Anne (for service to the arts)
- Jeffrey, Shirley AM (for service to Science)
- Layton, Faith AM (for service to the community, service to education and training)
- Myhill, Marion Elizabeth (for service to the community, service to Cultural Heritage)
- Meredith, Bronwen (for service to Human Rights)
- Newson, Lennah (Aunty Lennah) (for service to Aboriginal Affairs, service to the arts)
- Olley, June AM (for service to Science)
- Pybus, Betty Jean Vyvyan OAM (for service to health, service to the community)
- Polack, Mary Catherine OAM (for service to health)
- Roberts, Mary Grant (for service to the community)
- Smyth, Eris Mary OAM (for service to the community)
- Sattler, Barbara Millie MBE (for service to the community)
- Wilkinson, Robin Jane AM (for service to Human Rights)

== 2005 ==
- Adams, Gwendolyn Isabelle AM (for service to agriculture, service to the environment)
- Andersen, Clair (for service to education and training)
- Archer, Dr Geraldine (for service to Medicine, service to the community, service to the environment)
- Baker, Marjorie Gladys OAM (for service to the community)
- Ball, Aida Olive OAM (for service to education and training, service to the environment)
- Benjamin, Hon Phyllis Jean AO MBE (for service to Government)
- Binks, Mary OAM (for service to the community)
- Bligh, Marjorie Alfreda Willis (for service to the community, service to the arts)
- Bond, Ailsa Gray AM (for service to the community)
- Brown, Daphne Joyce OAM (for service to the community)
- Bright, Kathy (for service to the community)
- Burt, Glenn Vivien (for service to the community)
- Butler, Heather Rose (for service to Tourism, service to the community)
- Cairns, Joy Miriam OAM (for service to the community)
- Campbell-Smith, Mollie MBE (for services to education and training, service to the community)
- Carey, Eleanor Eileen (Nell) MBE (for service to the community)
- Chauncy, Nancen Beryl (Nan) (for service to the arts, service to the environment)
- Clingleffer, Janet (for service to sport and recreation)
- Coleman, Jill Estelle (for service to the community)
- Coombe, Shirley (for service to the community)
- Cowie, Roxena (Roxy) OAM (for service to the community)
- Curtis, Winifred Mary (for service to Science)
- Delrue, Chantale (for service to the arts)
- Dermody, Jacqueline Elizabeth (Jackie) (for service to the community)
- Dobson, Emily (for service to the community)
- Dodson, Gladys (for service to the community)
- Donohue, Mynie (Jane) (for service to the community, service to sport and recreation)
- Duerinckx, Chantal (for services to Childcare)
- Dulfer-Hyams, Joyce (Sue) (for service to Human Rights)
- Edwards, Dorothy Edna Annie CBE (for service to Government)
- Fazackerley, Kim (for service to sport and recreation)
- Fitz-Nead, Joan AM (for service to the community)
- Fitzpatrick, Cris OAM (for service to the community)
- Forlong, Eliza (for service to agriculture)
- Gartlan, Patricia Frances (for service to the community)
- Gillanders, Sandra (for service to Industry)
- Graham, Jessie (Iris) OAM (for service to the community, service to the arts)
- Grey, Eleanor (Betty) OAM (for service to the community, service to Human Rights)
- Grounds, Lucy Margaret (for service to Government, service to the community)
- Gurr, Elizabeth Joan (Betty) (for service to the community)
- Guy, Mary Phyllis (for service to the community)
- Harris, Patricia Margaret (for service to the community)
- Harvey, Pamela OAM (for service to the community)
- Harwood, Gwen AO (for service to the arts)
- Herbert, Rennie Elaine OAM (for service to the arts)
- Hiller, Christine (Kit) (for service to the arts)
- Holmes, Edith Lilla (for service to the arts)
- Innes, Heather AM (for service to Police, service to sport and recreation)
- Jack, Elizabeth (for service to sport and recreation)
- James, Gillian Hilma (Gill) AM (for service to the community)
- Johnson, Linda Mary (for service to the community)
- Johnstone, Philippa (for service to the community, service to health)
- Leary, Alma May (for service to sport and recreation)
- Le Mottee, Noreen (for service to the arts)
- Lindsay, Helen Ruth (for service to the community)
- Luck, Marjorie Ann OAM (for service to the arts, service to Human Rights)
- Lyons, Dame Enid AD OBE (for service to Government)
- Mallett, Dr Mary Frances (Aunty Molly) AM (for service to the community, service to Aboriginal Affairs)
- Mason, Norma (Lynn) (for service to Government, service to the community)
- McIntyre, Margaret Edgeworth OBE (for service to Government, service to the community)
- McTye, Doreen Margaret (for service to the arts)
- Moore, Robyn (for service to the arts)
- Morffew, Anne Lynette (Lynne) (for service to the community)
- O'Byrne, Anne AM (for service to the community, service to Human Rights)
- Paul, Lexie (for service to the community, service to the environment)
- Reeve, Valma (Fay) (for service to the community)
- Roe, Dr Margot (for service to Human Rights)
- Rudge, Maureen OAM (for service to health)
- Scott, Dr Margaret Daphne (for service to arts, service to education and training)
- Seen, Frances Ellen OAM (for service to the community)
- Sherwin, Frances Lillias (Amy) (for service to the arts)
- Smith, June OAM (for service to the community)
- Sumar, Sajini (for service to multicultural affairs)
- Twibell, Christina Beverley Clare (Bev) OAM (for service to the community)
- Trueman, Gwenith Patricia (Pym) (for service to the community)
- Venn, Kathleen Joan OAM (for service to the community)
- Vincent, Marion Mary (for service to the community)
- Walsh, Sister Mary MBE (for service to health, service to the community)
- West, Ida Amelia (Aunty Ida) AM (for service to Aboriginal Affairs)
- Wills, Beverley Ann AM (for service to the community)
- Williams, Nell OAM (for service to Industry)
- Winter, Christina Beatrice MBE (for service to the community)
- Woodberry, Dr Joan Merle AM (for service to Literature and Education)
- Woolley, Myra Fay OAM (for service to the community)
