= Prudence Bonham =

Australian politician and marine biologist

- Born: 1948 (age 77–78); Sydney
- Occupations: Politician, scientist

Academic work
- Institutions: CSIRO
- Main interests: Marine biology

Prudence Bonham (born 1948) is an Australian former politician and marine biologist. She was a Hobart City Council Alderman from 1990 to 2002 and the deputy lord mayor of Hobart from 1994 to 2002.

Bonham spent 26 years working as a marine biologist for CSIRO. She took part in various marine expeditions in the Australian region and the Antarctic.

Bonham was inducted into the Tasmanian Honour Roll of Women in 2013.
