= Martin Silink =

Australian paediatric endocrinologist

Martin Silink AO is an Australian paediatric endocrinologist specialising in type 1 diabetes, and Professor of Paediatrics and Child Health at the University of Sydney. In 2006, he became the first Australian president of the International Diabetes Federation. As the president of the IDF, he campaigned for international support of a United Nations resolution on diabetes, which encouraged governments to develop policies to prevent and treat diabetes. He was appointed Member of the Order of Australia in 2002 and promoted to Officer of the Order of Australia in 2014. He was nominated for Senior Australian of the Year in 2013.
