= List of alumni of Clare College, Cambridge =

The following is a list of alumni of Clare College, Cambridge, a constituent college of the University of Cambridge.

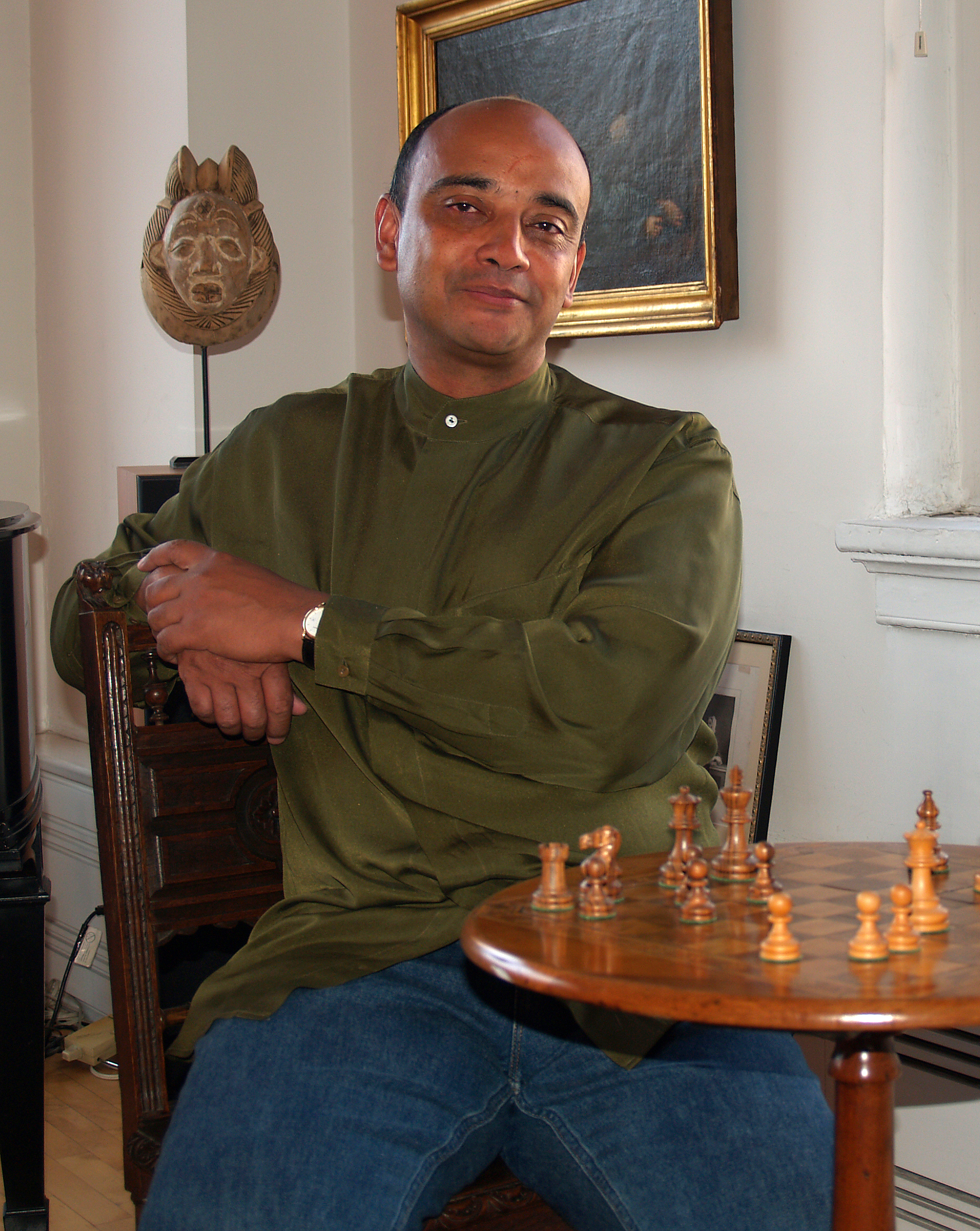
Kwame Anthony Appiah

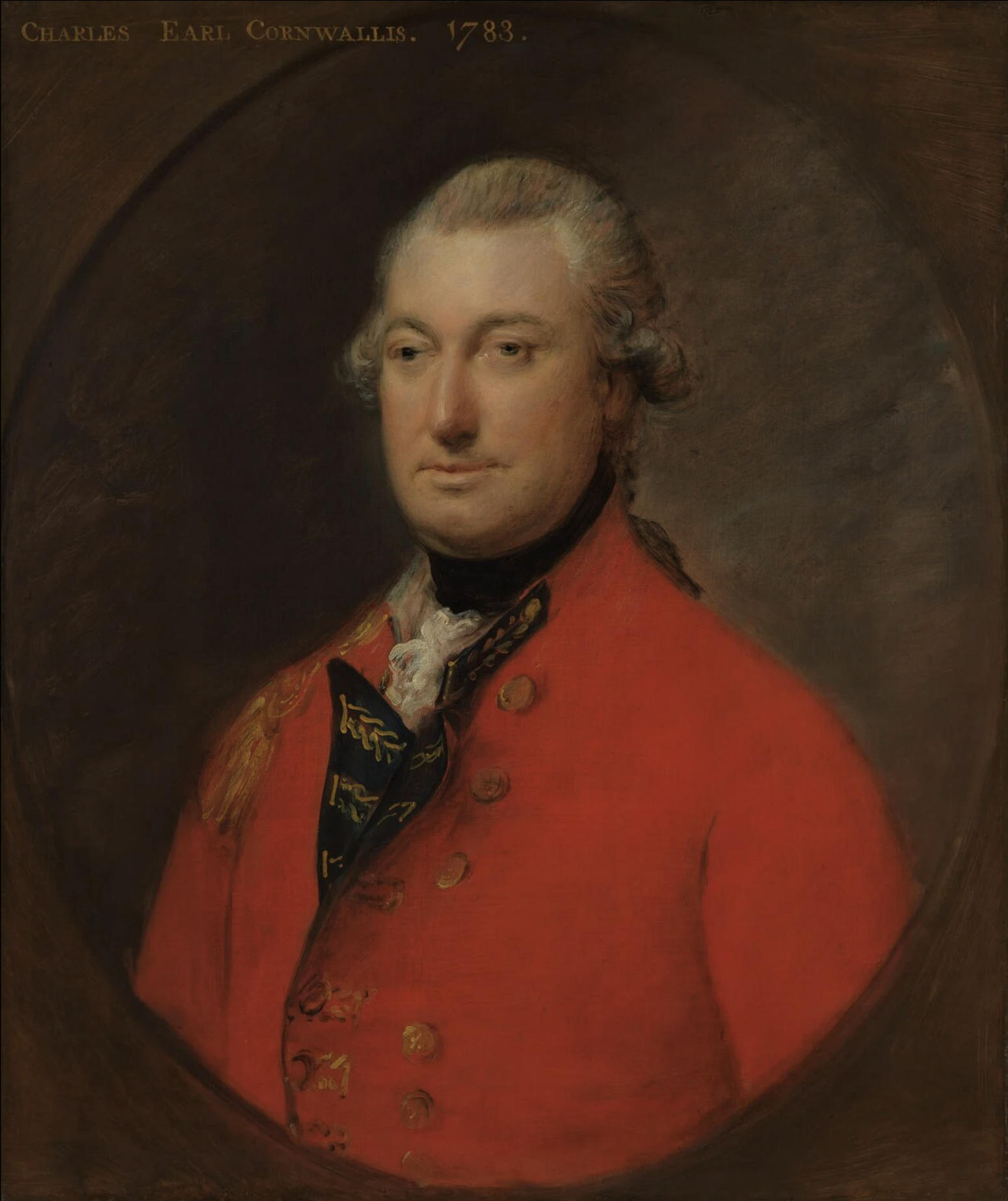
Charles Cornwallis, 1st Marquess Cornwallis

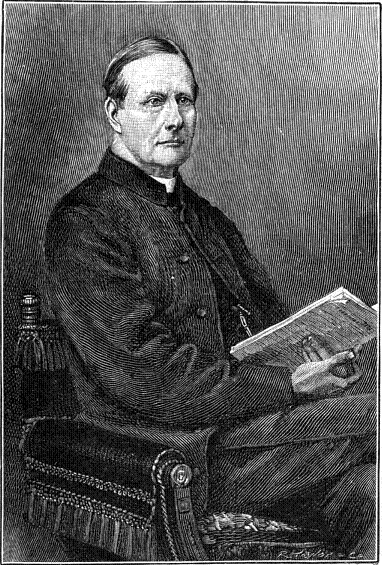
Sabine Baring-Gould

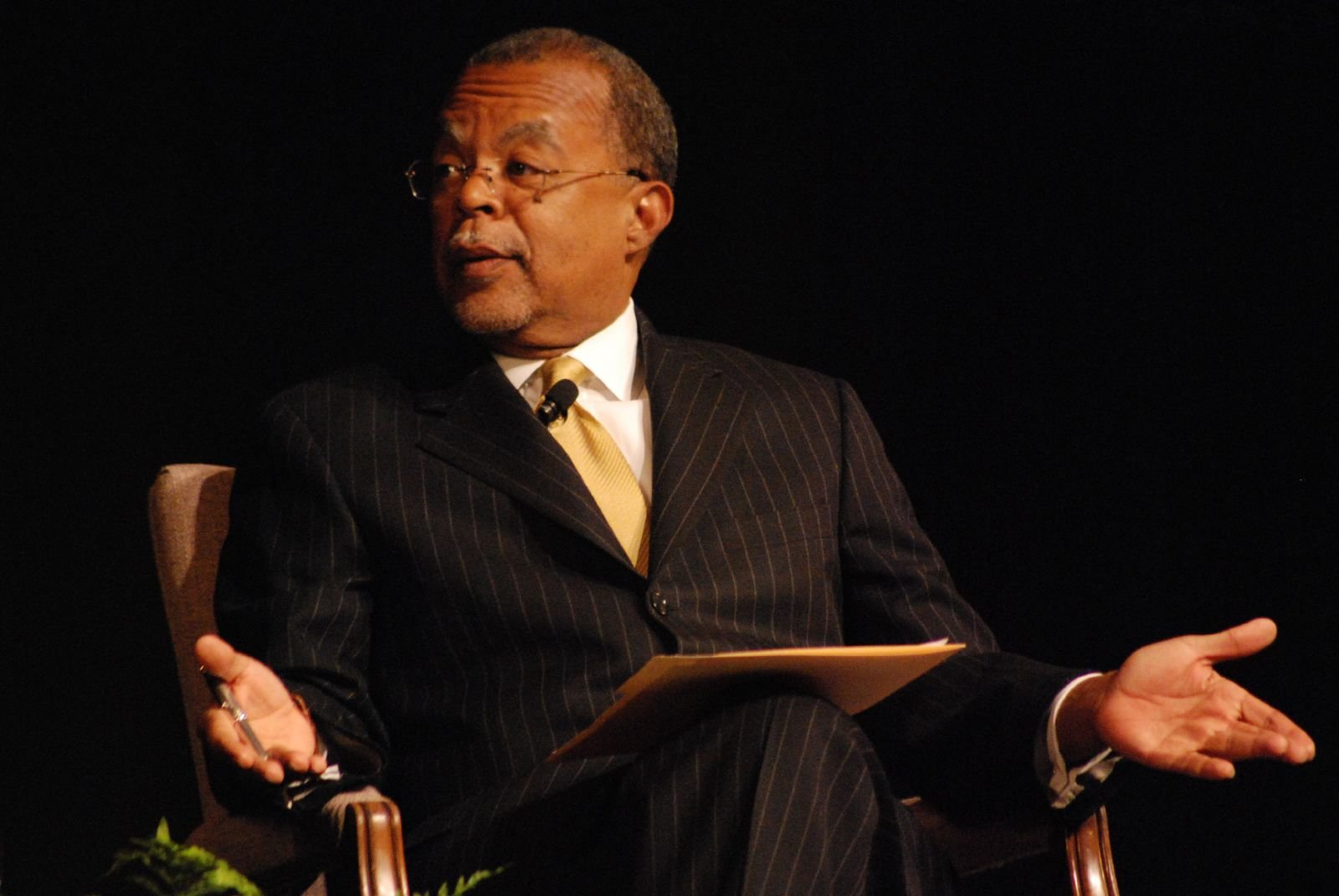
Henry Louis Gates Jr.

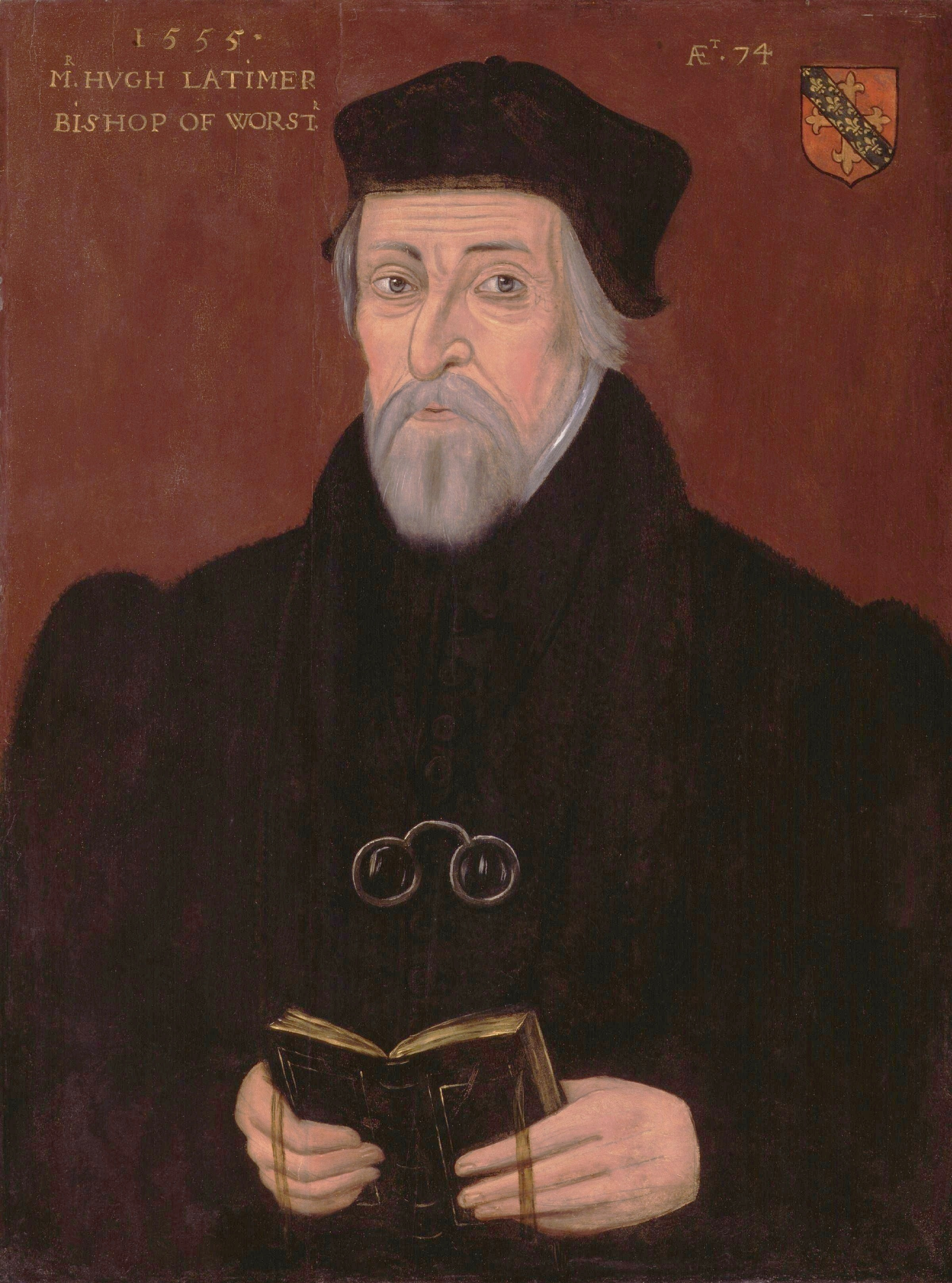
Hugh Latimer

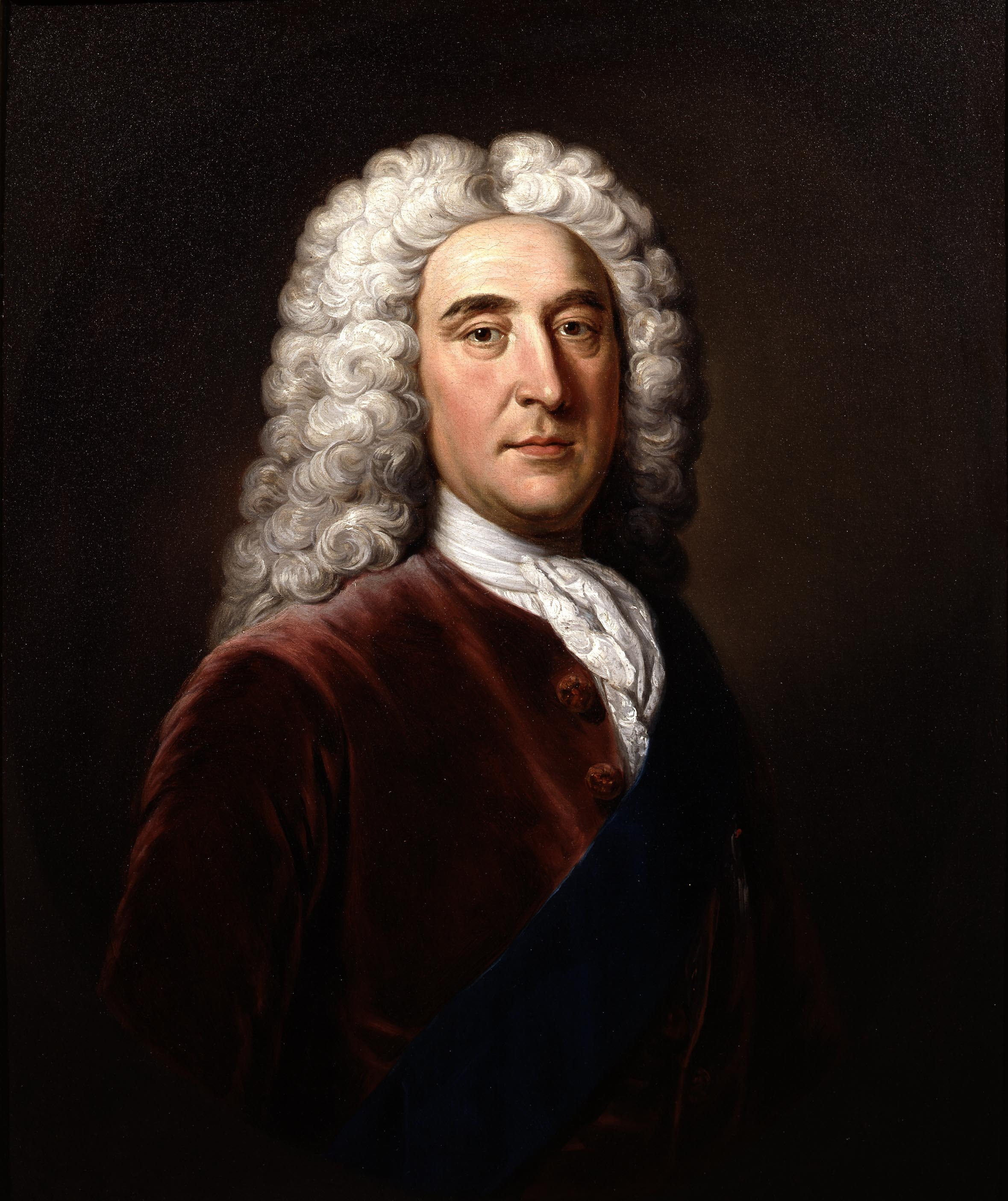
Thomas Pelham-Holles, 1st Duke of Newcastle

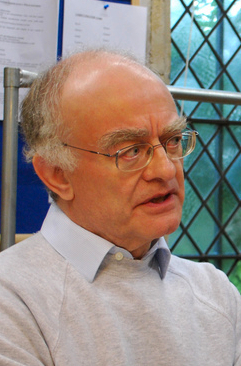
John Rutter

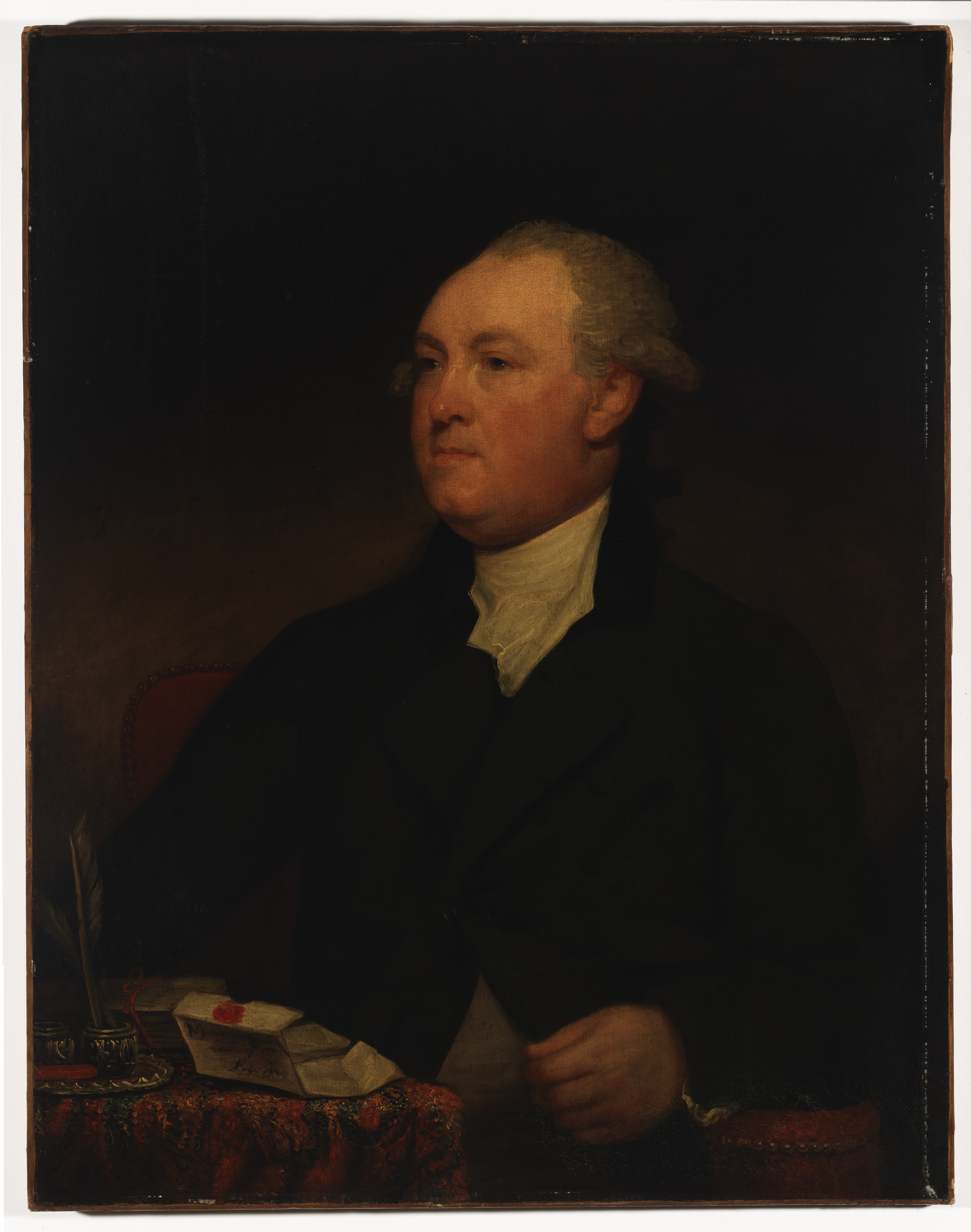
Thomas Townshend, 1st Viscount Sydney

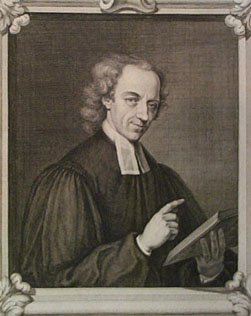
William Whiston

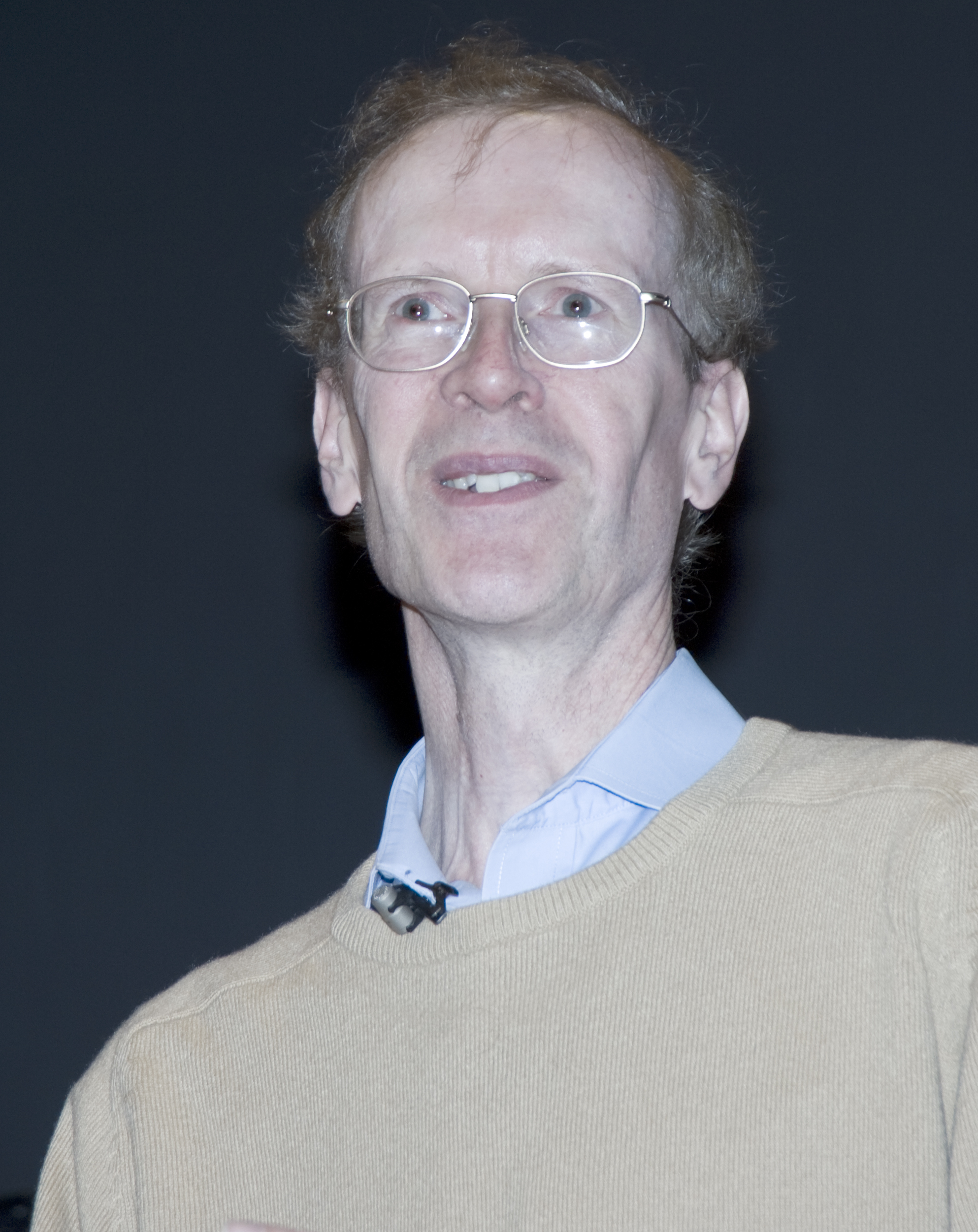
Andrew Wiles

== Former students ==
=== Academia ===
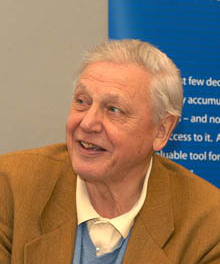
Sir David Attenborough, naturalist and broadcaster

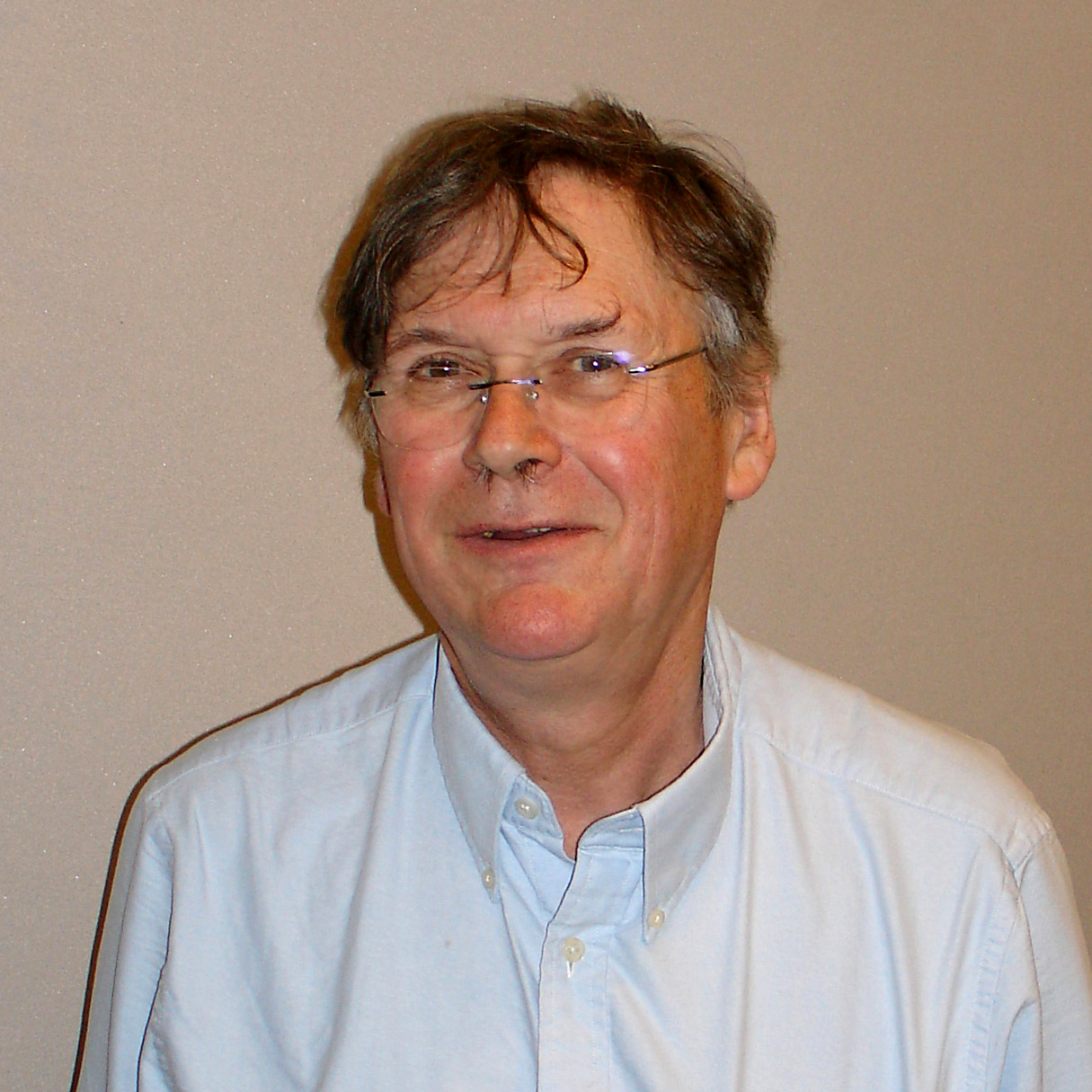
Tim Hunt, biochemist

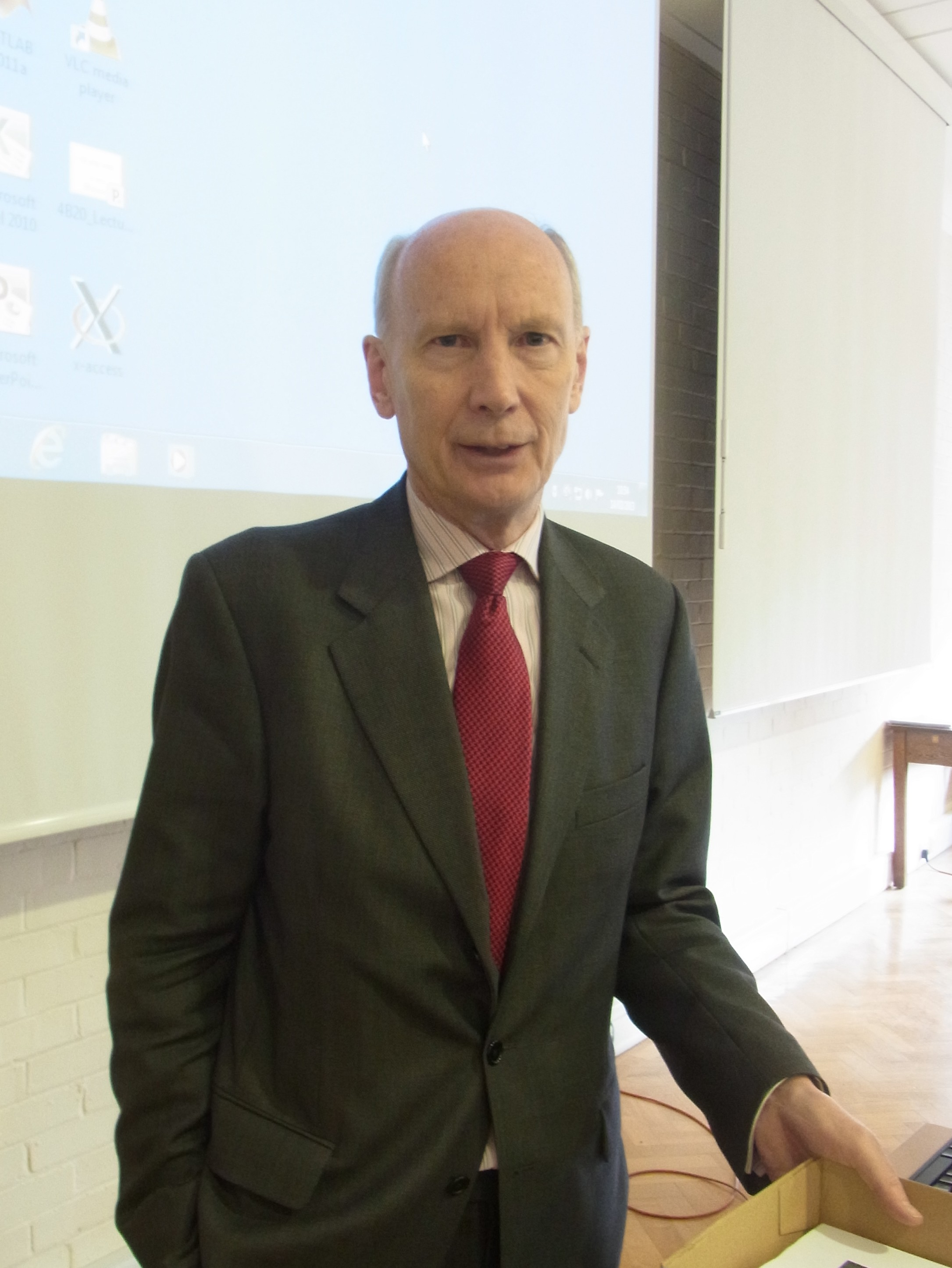
Robert Mair, Master of Jesus College, Cambridge

- Anthony Appiah, philosopher
- Eric Ashby, Baron Ashby, botanist and natural scientist, Master of the College 1959–67, Vice-Chancellor of the University of Cambridge 1967–69, founded Clare Hall, Cambridge
- Sir David Attenborough, naturalist
- John Baker, Baron Baker, scientist and engineer, Professor of Mechanical Sciences (latterly renamed Professor of Engineering) at the University of Cambridge, 1943–70
- David Mowbray Balme, classicist, First principal of the University College of the Gold Coast and later University of Ghana 1948 - 57, Professor of Classics, Queen Mary University of London
- Meredith Belbin, management theorist
- Jim Bennett, historian of science, museum curator in Cambridge and Oxford
- Roger Blench, anthropologist and linguist
- Sir John Boyd, Master of Churchill College, Cambridge 1996–2006
- David Cannadine, historian
- Hector Munro Chadwick, philologist and historian, Elrington and Bosworth Professor of Anglo-Saxon at the University of Cambridge 1912–41
- Mary Collins, immunologist
- Stephanie Cragg, professor of neuroscience at the University of Oxford
- Ralph Cudworth, philosopher and theologian, leader of the Cambridge Platonists, Master of the College 1644–50, Regius Professor of Hebrew at the University of Cambridge 1645–88
- David Dane, virologist
- Morris Dickstein, American cultural historian
- Daryl Dixon, economic writer and superannuation expert
- Julian Downward, cancer researcher
- Sir Ernest De Silva, Sri Lankan philanthropist
- Sir Geoffrey Rudolph Elton, historian of the Tudor period, Regius Professor of Modern History at the University of Cambridge 1983–88
- Eric Fawcett, physicist
- David Finney, statistician
- Steve Fuller, American sociologist, professor at the University of Warwick
- Henry Louis Gates, African-American academic
- Sir Harry Godwin, botanist and ecologist, founded the Godwin Institute for Quaternary Research in the University of Cambridge
- Trisha Greenhalgh, professor of primary health care at the University of Oxford
- John Guy, leading Tudor historian and Fellow of the college
- Nicholas Geoffrey Lemprière Hammond, classicist, historian and archaeologist
- James Rendel Harris, biblical scholar, theologian, palaeographer and mathematician
- Neil Harris, cultural historian at the University of Chicago, Guggenheim Fellow
- Thomas McKenny Hughes, Woodwardian Professor of Geology at the University of Cambridge 1873–1917
- Tim Hunt, biochemist
- Arthur Jaffe, mathematician and physicist, Professor at Harvard University
- Oscar Kempthorne, Distinguished Professor of Science and Humanities at Iowa State University, statistician and geneticist
- Geoffrey Kirk, 35th Regius Professor of Greek at the University of Cambridge
- Frances Kirwan, Professor of Mathematics at Oxford University
- Robert Mair, Master of Jesus College, Cambridge
- David Morley, British pioneer in children's health care
- Arthur Peacocke, scientist and theologian, Dean of the College 1973–84
- Sir Brian Pippard, first President of Clare Hall, Cambridge, Cavendish Professor of Physics at the University of Cambridge 1971–84
- Bethan Psaila, Professor of Haematology at Oxford
- James Raven, Professor of History at the University of Essex
- John D. Rosenberg, professor of English at Columbia University
- George Ruggle, early seventeenth-century scholar, philologist and playwright
- Mina Ryten, Van Geest Professor at the University of Cambridge and clinical geneticist
- Sir Nicholas John Shackleton, geologist, Professor at the Godwin Institute for Quaternary Research and the Department of Earth Sciences in the University of Cambridge
- Cecil Sharp, folklorist and ethnographer
- Merlin Sheldrake, mycologist and writer
- Rupert Sheldrake, scientist
- T. C. Smout, historian
- Harold McCarter Taylor, architectural historian
- Richard Taylor, Professor of Mathematics at Harvard University
- Sir Mark Walport, director of Wellcome Trust
- James D. Watson, double helix discoverer and human genome advocate
- Abraham Whelock, seventeenth-century scholar, philologist and Arabist
- William Whiston, Lucasian Professor of Mathematics at the University of Cambridge 1702–11, theologian
- Andrew Wiles, mathematician who proved Fermat's Last Theorem
- Lauren Winner, professor of theology at Duke University
- Simon Wren-Lewis, Professor of Economics at Oxford

=== Arts ===
- Peter Ackroyd, author
- Robyn Addison, actor, played Sarah Boyer in Survivors and Joanne Coldwell in Casualty
- Sabine Baring-Gould, Victorian novelist
- John Berryman, American poet
- Christian Coulson, actor
- Amanda Craig, novelist
- Trent Ford, American actor and model
- Tessa Hadley, novelist
- Nick Harkaway, novelist
- Georgie Henley, actress, best known for her role as Lucy Pevenise in The Chronicles of Narnia series
- Kit Hesketh-Harvey, comic performer and scriptwriter
- Sue Lenier, poet and playwright
- Ian McDonald, writer
- China Miéville, writer
- Stuart Murphy, chief executive of the English National Opera
- Allison Pearson, author and newspaper columnist
- Siegfried Sassoon, war poet
- David Shapiro, American poet
- Marcel Theroux, writer
- Richard Wald, television executive, former president of NBC News
- Stephen Wyatt, television writer
- William Whitehead, Poet Laureate 1757–85
- Dan Zeff, director

=== Business ===
- Mohammed Amin, businessman
- Sir Max Bemrose, industrialist
- Stewart Butterfield, Canadian entrepreneur, co-founded photo-sharing website Flickr and the team-messaging application Slack.
- Randy Lerner, American entrepreneur, owner of Aston Villa and Cleveland Browns
- Constantine Leventis, Greek Cypriot businessman and philanthropist
- Paul Mellon, benefactor
- Jirō Shirasu, Japanese bureaucrat, businessman

=== Clergy ===
- John Barret (1646–1650), Presbyterian divine and religious writer
- M. A. Bayfield (1852–1922), classical scholar, author, headmaster, clergyman and spiritualist
- Nicholas Ferrar, religious leader
- John Short Hewett, Rector of Rotherhithe and Fellow of Clare College
- John Hewett founder of All Saints', Babbacombe
- James Butler Knill Kelly, Anglican Bishop of Newfoundland
- Hugh Latimer, chaplain to Edward VI, Bishop of Worcester and martyr
- Thomas Merton, writer, Catholic thinker and monk
- John Moore, Bishop of Ely 1707–14
- David Payne, Anglican priest
- John Tillotson, Archbishop of Canterbury 1691–94
- Joseph Truman, ejected minister 1631–1671
- Ralph Wheelock (1600–1684), puritan scholar, first schoolmaster of America's first free school in Dedham, Massachusetts, and great-grandfather of Dartmouth College founder Eleazer Wheelock
- Vernon White Canon Theologian & Subdean of Westminster Abbey
- Richard Williamson, traditionalist Catholic bishop

=== Journalism ===
- D. D. Guttenplan, American journalist, editor of The Nation
- Richard Locke, American critic, former editor-in-chief of Vanity Fair and president of the National Book Critics Circle
- Henry Longhurst, sports journalist, television broadcaster
- D. Keith Mano, political commentator
- David Meek (as David Tyler), television and radio producer
- Norman Podhoretz, neoconservative journalist and cultural commentator
- Najam Sethi, journalist
- Gillian Tett, US managing editor of the Financial Times and author of the book Fool's Gold
- ((Matthew Parris)), Times political sketch writer and columnist. Host of BBC Radio 4 Great Lives

=== Law ===
- Desmond Ackner, Baron Ackner, British judge and Lord of Appeal in Ordinary
- Sheldon Amos (1835–1886), English jurist
- Sir Paul Girvan, Lord Justice of Appeal, Supreme Court of Northern Ireland
- Sir Bob Hepple, attorney, advocate and anti-apartheid campaigner in South Africa until 1963, specialist in labour law, industrial relations, equality and anti-discrimination law, Master of the College 1993–2003, Professor of Law at the University of Cambridge 1995–2001
- Kurt Lipstein, German-born lawyer, specialist in Roman law and conflict of laws within private international law and public international law and pioneer in comparative law, Fellow of the College 1956–2006, Professor of Comparative Law at the University of Cambridge 1973–76
- Dame Clare Moulder, former High Court judge
- Usha Vance, American lawyer and wife of JD Vance, Vice President of the United States

=== Military ===
- Charles Cornwallis, 1st Marquess Cornwallis, British general in the American Revolutionary War
- Sir Michael Le Fanu, Admiral of the Fleet of the Royal Navy
- Sir Charles Hanson, 2nd Baronet, soldier and stockbroker
- Sir Richard Knighton, Chief of the Air Staff
- General Sir Charles Richardson, Chief Royal Engineer and Master-General of the Ordnance

=== Music ===
- Ivor Bolton, conductor and musical director, founded the St James's Baroque Players, founder and musical director of the Lufthansa Festival of Baroque Music, regular conductor at the Bavarian State Opera, Principal Conductor of the Mozarteum Orchestra of Salzburg
- Tim Brown, conductor and choral director
- Clive Carey, baritone and composer
- Nicholas Collon, musician, co-founded Aurora Orchestra and Cappella Artois
- Richard Egarr, harpsichordist and fortepianist, musical director of the Academy of Ancient Music
- Patrick Gowers, composer, conductor and arranger
- Ruth Holton, soprano
- Martin How, composer and organist
- Andrew Manze, baroque violinist and broadcaster, musical director of The English Concert
- Sir Roger Norrington, conductor, founded the London Classical Players
- Graham Ross, composer, conductor and Director of Music of the Choir of Clare College, Cambridge 2010–present
- John Rutter, composer, conductor, editor, arranger, record producer and Director of Music of the Choir of Clare College, Cambridge 1975–79
- David Schiff, American composer
- Peter Seabourne, composer, record producer at Sheva Contemporary. Composition pupil of Robin Holloway 1980-83
- Richard Stilgoe, songwriter, lyricist and musician
- Jeremy Thurlow, composer
- Robin Ticciati, conductor, pianist, percussionist and violinist, co-founded Aurora Orchestra
- Clive Wearing, musician, musicologist, broadcaster and amnesiac
- Christopher Willis, film composer
- Maury Yeston, composer, lyricist, musicologist

=== Politics and public service ===
- Brian Abel-Smith, health economist and special adviser to the Wilson administration.
- Sir Alex Allan, chairman of the Joint Intelligence Committee, 2007-11
- Patrick Diamond, former special adviser to Peter Mandelson during the first Blair administration.
- Sir Ernest Gowers, civil servant and author of Plain Words.
- John Hervey, 1st Earl of Bristol, British MP and supporter of the Hanoverian Succession
- John Hervey, 2nd Baron Hervey, British MP and eldest son of John Hervey, 1st Earl of Bristol by his second marriage
- David Howarth, former Liberal Democrat MP for Cambridge and Fellow of the college
- Robert Key, Conservative MP
- Jon Lansman, co-founder and chair of Momentum
- Peter Lilley, Conservative MP
- Liz Lloyd, adviser to former Prime Minister Tony Blair
- Tim Loughton, Conservative MP
- Matthew Parris, broadcaster, political analyst and former Conservative MP
- Thomas Pelham-Holles, 1st Duke of Newcastle-upon-Tyne, Prime Minister of Great Britain
- Geoffrey Robinson, Labour MP
- Amanda Spielman, Her Majesty's Chief Inspector, Ofsted
- Peter Malden Studd, Lord Mayor of London and cricketer
- Richard Taylor, Independent Kidderminster Hospital and Health Concern, MP
- Thomas Townshend, 1st Viscount Sydney, senior British politician after whom Sydney, Australia was named
- Russell Viner, Chief Scientific Advisor at the Department for Education, and Professor of Adolescent Health at UCL Great Ormond Street Institute of Child Health
- Richard Wainwright, Liberal MP
- Sir John Waldron, Commissioner of Police of the Metropolis, 1968–72
- Christopher Wandesford, Lord Deputy of Ireland in 1640
- Michael Wills, Labour MP
- Paul Wilson, Baron Wilson of High Wray, Governor of the BBC and Lord Lieutenant of Cumbria
- Richard Wilson, Baron Wilson of Dinton, civil servant and Cabinet Secretary, Master of Emmanuel College, Cambridge
- Ian Winterbottom, Baron Winterbottom, Labour MP and peer

=== Sports ===
- Tim Anderson, Commonwealth Games gold medal winner and Olympian
- Granville Coghlan (1907–1983), rugby union international, represented Great Britain on 1927 British Lions tour to Argentina
- Harry Colt, golfer and golf course architect, credited with the design of Wentworth Club, Royal Portrush and Royal Liverpool
- Noël Cunningham-Reid, winner of the 1957 1000 km of Nürburgring sportscar race
- Duleepsinhji, cricketer and Indian public servant
- Merrick Elderton (1884–1939), cricketer and educator
- Churchill Gunasekara, cricketer, first player from Ceylon to play for an English county in county cricket
- John Human, cricketer, played first-class cricket for Middlesex
- David Jennens, rower who represented Cambridge University and Great Britain
- Paul Klenerman (born 1963), Olympic sabre fencer
- Alfred Perry Lucas, cricketer, played test cricket for England in five matches
- John Rinkel, Olympic athlete
- Charles Sergel, rower who represented Cambridge University and Great Britain

=== Other ===
- Dudley Hooper (1911–1968), British accountant, early promoter of electronic data processing, and President of the British Computer Society
- Matt Kirshen, stand-up comedian
- Rebecca Levene, author of Doctor Who novels
- Mohan Munasinghe, environmental campaigner, founder of Munasinghe Institute for Development, vice chair of IPCC which won Nobel Peace Prize 2007 jointly with Al Gore
- Andrew Sentance, Member of Bank of England Monetary Policy Committee, 2006–11, and Chief Economist 1998–2006 at British Airways

== See also ==
- List of Masters of Clare College, Cambridge
