= Australian Research Council Centre of Excellence in Synthetic Biology =

Facility in Sydney, Australia

Coordinates: 33.773824°S 151.11265°E

The Australian Research Council (ARC) Centre of Excellence in Synthetic Biology (CoESB) is a research centre that combines molecular biology, biotechnology, engineering, philosophy and ethics to design and build microbes that produce valuable products from agricultural and municipal waste. The Centre aims to use these microbes to seed a bio-based circular economy and leverage Australia's strengths in agriculture.

The CoESB was awarded A$35 million in funding by the Australian Research Council, A$1 million from the New South Wales Government and A$13.1 million from partner organisations including Australian and international universities, public and private companies and government departments. As of December 2021 CoESB members have attracted A$23 million in additional funding from competitive grant schemes.

The Centre held a virtual soft launch on 8 December 2020 and is planned to run for seven years (2020-2027).

One start-up company, Samsara, has been spun out the Centre. Samsara is an enviro-tech company using bacterial enzymes to recycle otherwise hard to recycle plastics.

== Organisation ==
Distinguished Professor Ian Paulsen from Macquarie University is Centre Director and Professor Aleksandra Filipovska from The University of Western Australia is Centre Deputy Director. The CoESB headquarters are located at Macquarie University.

Collaborators and partners of the CoESB are

- The University of Western Australia
- Queensland University of Technology
- The University of Queensland
- University of Newcastle (Australia)|The University of Newcastle
- The Australian National University
- The University of New South Wales
- Curtin University
- Western Sydney University
- The University of Sydney
- The University of Melbourne
- Commonwealth Scientific and Industrial Research Organisation (CSIRO)
- The University of York, UK
- University of Edinburgh, UK
- National University of Singapore
- The University of Manchester, UK
- Imperial College London
- Weizmann Institute of Science
- Chinese Academy of Sciences
- Amyris
- LanzaTech
- Gratuk Technologies
- Microbial Screening Technologies
- Microba
- Spanish National Research Council
- Manildra Group
- Australian Wine Research Institute
- Department of Primary Industries (New South Wales)
- Calysta Energy
- Bioplatforms Australia
- East West Capital
- Neochromosome Inc
- New York University
- Scion New Zealand Crown Research Institute
- Bondi Bio
- Twist Bioscience
- Cemvita Factory
- AllG Foods

The CoESB has engaged a Designer-in-Residence, Dr Jestin George, in 2021-2022 to run workshops for Centre members on the intersection of synthetic biology and design. The Designer-in-Residence in conjunction with a Centre Associate Investigator, Dr Andrew Care, edit an Australian not-for-profit magazine SYNTHESIS.

== Research Programs ==
The aims and objectives of the CoESB are to "engineer synthetic microbes to create a new environmentally friendly and sustainable advanced biomanufacturing industry" and "build next generation microbial cell factories capable of biochemical transformations that are not possible using natural systems".

The CoESB has three research themes:

- Synthetic Microbial Communities
- Synthetic Organelles
- Neobiochemistry

The Centre also has three research capabilities that underlie and support the research themes to maximise research impact:

- Systems Bioengineering
- Industrial Translation
- Social Dimensions

== Investigators ==
As at December 2021, the CoESB has 17 Chief Investigators, 18 Partner Investigators, 22 Associate Investigators, 43 postdoctoral research fellows and 82 higher degree research students conducting research.

Role	Name	Organisation
Director	Ian Paulsen	Macquarie University
Deputy Director	Aleksandra Filipovska	The University of Western Australia
Chief Operating Officer	J-L Heylen	Macquarie University
Chief Investigators	Brett Neilan	The University of Newcastle
Chief Investigators	Lars Nielsen	The University of Queensland
Chief Investigators	Rachel Parker	The University of Queensland
Chief Investigators	Michael Gillings	Macquarie University
Chief Investigators	Lawrence Lee	The University of New South Wales
Chief Investigators	Oliver Rackham	Curtin University
Chief Investigators	Ian O'Hara	Queensland University of Technology
Chief Investigators	Robert Speight	Queensland University of Technology
Chief Investigators	Esteban Marcellin	The University of Queensland
Chief Investigators	Kirill Alexandrov	Queensland University of Technology
Chief Investigators	Nicki Packer	Macquarie University
Chief Investigators	Wendy Rogers	Macquarie University
Chief Investigators	Josh Wodak	Western Sydney University
Chief Investigators	Colin Jackson	The Australian National University
Chief Investigators	Brad Sherman	The University of Queensland
