= Manuel Ferreira =

Manuel Ferreira can refer to:

- Manuel Ferreira (footballer) (1905–1983), an Argentine footballer
- Manuel Ferreira (writer) (1917–1992), a Portuguese writer
- Manuel Ferreira, geneticist, Ruth Stephens Gani Medalist

== See also ==
- Manuel Ferrara (born 1975), a French pornographic actor and director
