= List of Survivors episodes =

List of Survivors episodes may refer to:

- List of Survivors (1975 TV series) episodes
- List of Survivors (2008 TV series) episodes
