= Marnie Blewitt =

Australian epigeneticist

Marnie E. Blewitt
- Born: Marnie E. Blewitt
- Education: University of Sydney (University Medalist, Ph.D.)
- Known for: X-inactivation
- Awards: Genetics Society of Australia DG Catcheside; L'Oréal-UNESCO Awards for Women in Science
- Scientific career
- Fields: Epigenetics
- Workplaces: Walter and Eliza Hall Institute, University of Melbourne
- Doctoral advisor: Emma Whitelaw

Marnie Blewitt is head of a division at WEHI, which focuses on X-inactivation, and is engaged in research on the role of polycomb-group proteins in hematopoietic stem cell function.

== Scientific career ==
=== Education ===
She completed undergraduate studies in 1999 at The University of Sydney, with honours and a double major of Molecular Biology and Genetics. As part of her doctoral research at the same institution under the supervision of Associate Professor Emma Whitelaw, she designed a sensitised mutagenesis screen to find new epigenetic modifiers in mice, for which she was awarded the Genetics Society of Australia DG Catcheside prize for the best PhD in genetics. She moved to Melbourne at the end of 2005 to accept a Peter Doherty post-doctoral fellowship in Doug Hilton's lab from 2005 to 2009, before becoming laboratory head in January 2010.

=== Research interests ===
Blewitt's lab focuses on molecular mechanisms behind epigenetic control of gene expression. Her lab has worked on one of the mouse mutants identified in the mutagenesis screen, identifying a critical role for the protein Smchd1 in X inactivation in cancer. Other research activities include the study of the roles of polycomb-group proteins in hematopoietic stem cell function.

== Teaching and public service ==
Marnie Blewitt conducted a massive open online course in epigenetics at Coursera starting on 28 April 2014.

== Awards and honors ==
- Genetics Society of Australia D.G. Catcheside Prize (2006)
- National Health and Medical Research Council Fellowship (2006)
- L'Oréal-UNESCO Awards for Women in Science (2009)
- National Health and Medical Research Council Grants (2008, 2011, 2012, 2013)
- Australian Academy of Science Ruth Stephens Gani Medal (2009)

== Personal life ==
Blewitt is married and has two children.

== Selected publications ==
- Blewitt ME, Gendrel AV, Pang Z, Sparrow DB, Whitelaw N, Craig JM, Apedaile A, Hilton DJ, Dunwoodie SL, Brockdorff N, Kay GF, Whitelaw E (2008). "SmcHD1, containing a structural-maintenance-of-chromosomes hinge domain, has a critical role in X inactivation". Nat Genet. 40 (5): 663–9. doi:10.1038/ng.142. PMID 18425126.
- Majewski IJ, Blewitt ME, de Graaf CA, McManus EJ, Bahlo M, Hilton AA, Hyland CD, Smyth GK, Corbin JE, Metcalf D, Alexander WS, Hilton DJ (2008). "Polycomb repressive complex 2 (PRC2) restricts hematopoietic stem cell activity". PLOS Biol. 6 (4): e93. doi:10.1371/journal.pbio.0060093. PMC 2292752. PMID 18416604.
- Blewitt ME, Vickaryous NK, Hemley SJ, Ashe A, Bruxner TJ, Preis JI, Arkell R, Whitelaw E (2005). "An ENU screen for genes involved in variegation in the mouse". Proc Natl Acad Sci U S A. 102 (21): 7629–7634. doi:10.1073/pnas.0409375102. PMC 1140414. PMID 15890782.
- Ashe A, Morgan DK, Whitelaw NC, Bruxner TJ, Vickaryous NK, Cox LL, Butterfield NC, Wicking C, Blewitt ME, Wilkins SJ, Anderson GJ, Cox TC, Whitelaw E (2008). "A genome-wide screen for modifiers of transgene variegation identifies genes with critical roles in development". Genome Biol. 9 (12) R182. doi:10.1186/gb-2008-9-12-r182. PMC 2646286. PMID 19099580.
- Chong S, Vickaryous N, Ashe A, Zamudio N, Youngson N, Hemley S, Stopka T, Skoultchi A, Matthews J, Scott HS, de Kretser D, O'Bryan M, Blewitt M, Whitelaw E (2007). "Modifiers of epigenetic reprogramming show paternal effects in the mouse". Nat Genet. 39 (5): 614–22. doi:10.1038/ng2031. PMC 3199608. PMID 17450140.
- Blewitt ME, Vickaryous NK, Paldi A, Koseki H, Whitelaw E (2006). "Dynamic reprogramming of DNA methylation at an epigenetically sensitive allele in mice". PLOS Genet. 2 (4): e49. doi:10.1371/journal.pgen.0020049. PMC 1428789. PMID 16604157.
- Rakyan VK, Chong S, Champ ME, Cuthbert PC, Morgan HD, Luu KVK, Whitelaw E (2003). "Transgenerational inheritance of epigenetic states at the murine AxinFu allele occurs following maternal and paternal transmission". Proc Natl Acad Sci U S A. 100 (5): 2538–43. doi:10.1073/pnas.0436776100. PMC 151376. PMID 12601169.
