= Vanessa Hayes =

Australian geneticist

- Born: Cape Town, South Africa
- Citizenship: Australia
- Awards: Fellow of the Australian Academy of Health and Medical Sciences (2024)
- Scientific career
- Fields: Cancer genomics, comparative human genomics

Vanessa Hayes is a South African-Australian geneticist conducting research into cancer genomics and comparative human genomics. She leads a research group at the Garvan Institute of Medical Research in Sydney Australia and holds the Petre Chair of Prostate Cancer Research at the University of Sydney.

== Early life and education ==
Hayes was born in Cape Town, South Africa. She undertook BSc and Masters education at Stellenbosch University In 1999 she completed PhD studies in cancer genetics at the University of Groningen, Netherlands.

== Career ==
Hayes' first research position was at Stellenbosch University, investigating genetic susceptibility to HIV/AIDS. Her work identified the lack of knowledge about African gene variants that hindered pharmacogenomics research, including into the efficacy of HIV treatments.

In 2003, Hayes moved to Sydney, Australia, to lead research into cancer genetics at the Garvan Institute of Medical Research. She subsequently joined the Children's Cancer Institute of Australia (CCIA)

In 2009, Hayes was awarded a Fulbright professional scholarship to develop her expertise in genome analysis at Penn State University, with the intention of establishing a cancer genome research program focusing on prostate cancer, at the newly established UNSW Lowy Cancer Research Centre.

While at the CCIA, Hayes worked on the South African Genome Project with researchers from the University of New South Wales and Penn State University in the US to compile the genome sequences of southern Africans, including Archbishop Desmond Tutu. Until this research, most human genome sequences had been derived from people of European origin. Hayes and her collaborators revealed in 2010 that the genetic diversity among people in southern Africa is greater than among other populations worldwide.

In 2010, Hayes joined the J. Craig Venter Institute in San Diego, California, US, where she continued her research into human genetic diversity. That year she began leading a study sequencing DNA from a skeleton of an African hunter gatherer from around 315 BC found in St Helena Bay in South Africa. The DNA identified the skeleton as being from a man who was part of a previously unknown branch of the human family tree that diverged from the common lineage shared by all humans alive today. The study highlighted the significance of southern African archaeological remains in defining human origins and was published in the journal Genome Biology and Evolution in 2014.

In 2011, Hayes was part of a research team that released details of Tasmanian devil population genetics, part of the research efforts towards understanding the devil facial tumour disease

Hayes's research also includes the study of prostate cancer genetics. One aspect has been investigating the genetic causes of aggressive prostate cancer that is seen in men of African ancestry

Since January 2014, Hayes has held the Petre Chair of Prostate Cancer Research at the University of Sydney.

== Media appearances ==
On Tuesday 23 February 2016 ABC broadcast an episode of Catalyst entitled 'Out of Africa' which explored Hayes's comparative genomics work in southern Africa.

On Tuesday 23 October 2017, Hayes appeared on SBS Insight's “DNA Surprises ” episode which dealt with the complex issues around ancestry testing through online companies, and particularly the unexpected information ancestry testing can uncover.

== Awards and recognition ==
- 2006 – BNP Paribas Award for Cancer Genetics
- 2007 – Australian Young Tall Poppy Award for Science
- 2007 – NSW Premier's Award for Outstanding Cancer Research Fellow
- 2008 – Ruth Stephens Gani Medal for Human Genetics, Australian Academy of Science
- 2009 – Fulbright professional scholarship
- 2013 – Celebration of African Australians Inc Award
- 2024 – Fellow of the Australian Academy of Health and Medical Sciences
