= Sera (Dragon Age) =

Fictional character in Dragon Age franchise

- Dragon Age character
- Sera as she appears in Dragon Age: Inquisition.
- First appearance: Dragon Age: Inquisition (2014)
- Voiced by: Robyn Addison

Sera is a fictional character in BioWare's Dragon Age franchise. She first appears in 2014's Dragon Age: Inquisition, where she serves as a party member. She is a member of a secret society called the Friends of Red Jenny, an enigmatic group of subversive vigilantes trying to undermine the perceived abuse committed by the nobility of Thedas, the setting of Dragon Age, by engaging in espionage and social banditry. Sera is voiced by English actress Robyn Addison.

Sera has received mixed commentary from critics; while some sources appreciated Sera for her irreverent personality or as a realistic portrayal of an LGBT character, other sources criticized the character's abrasiveness and called her irritating.

== Concept and design ==
Sera is written by Lukas Kristjanson, a senior writer for Inquisition. Kristjanson explained that the character is "all about the energy of the moment. She’s frustrating and fun at the same time. You have to meet her at her level, not drag her to yours. Her music was loud, silly, and mean, except when suddenly sweet. Stuff may or may not be on fire, but odds are good it will be soon". He noted that music by the Scottish band The Fratellis and American ska punk band Dance Hall Crashers would be something Sera would appreciate.

Sera's unconventional lifestyle, often in the company of like-minded people and with few permanent ties, is reflected in her appearance and choice of clothing. Sera's character kit, released by Bioware, describes her as someone who cuts her own hair in an unskilled manner and wearing whatever she likes for as long as she likes it, and that "should she like something else, she’ll steal it". In the Dragon Age series, she is the first female companion that can be romanced only by other women.

Sera is the subject of a song titled "Sera Was Never" composed by Raney Shockne. "Sera Was Never", along with other songs sung by Elizaveta Khripounova, are occasionally "performed" by a non-player character named Maryden Halewell whenever the Inquisitor enters the tavern in their base of operations. The song is part of a collection of tavern songs and song sheets called Dragon Age Inquisition: The Bard Songs, which were made free to download from January 26 to February 9, 2015 by BioWare due to substantial fan demand, after which they were offered available for sale on various digital platforms.

== Appearances ==
After the Inquisition, the player character's paramilitary organization, concludes their business at Val Royeaux early in the game, an arrow with a message attached will land nearby, giving the locations of three satchels with instructions. These clues lead the player to a confrontation with a non-player character in a secluded courtyard, who assumes that the Inquisition was targeting him. Sera kills the man with a bow and arrow, then introduces herself and asks to join the Inquisition to fight for the less privileged. She will justify her killing of the non-player character if challenged, and insists that "bad things should happen to bad people".

Sera's recruitment allows players access to side quests and war table operations, which involve locating information or resource caches left for a member of her vigilante organization, the Friends of Red Jenny. Unlike other party members, the player may dismiss Sera from the Inquisition at any time after she joins. The nature of her response will vary depending on her approval rating at the time. She will eventually leave the Inquisition on her own if she continually disapproves of the Inquisitor's actions. Her departure from the Inquisition will also end any romantic relationship between her and the Inquisitor.

Sera may appear in the Trespasser downloadable content (DLC) if she stays in the Inquisitor's party, where she will offer the Inquisitor membership in the Friends of Red Jenny. The Inquisitor may accept Sera's wedding proposal if they are still in a relationship by the events of Trespasser; this is noted by Jessica Hylton, author of an essay published in the book Women and Video Game Modding: Essays on Gender and the Digital Community, as "one of the first explicitly same-sex weddings seen on screen" at the time. If Sera is not in a romantic relationship with the Inquisitor, the epilogue for the Trespasser DLC reveals that she is dating the dwarven arcanist, Dagna.

== Critical reception ==
Sera has received a mixed response from critics and players. Gita Jackson, writing for Kotaku, said Sera is "hate at first sight" for her, but conceded that the character is not poorly written. She took issue with the fact that Sera's personality is too self-absorbed to have long-term plans, and that the class issues she fights for is eclipsed by her personal issues. She compares and contrasts her to Robin Hood, noting that "Robin Hood, though, had a specific man he wanted to overthrow, to help specific people, overthrowing a specific oppressive system for the betterment of a community. Sera doesn’t have any specificity, nor any real desire to create lasting change for the lower classes". Kath Rella, guest writing for The Queerness for its gaming month in March 2017, said her first impression of Sera is "rude, crude and thoroughly argumentative", and that she is "like a chimpanzee on cocaine". Conversely, Fraser Brown from PCGamesN called Sera the best character in Inquisition, and mentions The Iron Bull being the closest contender. Among the aspects that Brown has praised include her antics, her incidental party banter, and the "Sera Was Never" song. He noted that Sera is paradoxically loopy yet grounded as a character, and that she "elicit strong feelings. A lot of people seem to hate her", comparing her divisive reception to the general public perception of marmite. Nicholas Scibetta from GameCrate was in agreement, praising Sera's sense of humour, her combat abilities and spontaneous reactions to various adversaries, her personal quests and side missions, the "Sera Was Never" song, as well as her care and concern for the common folk.

The depiction of Sera's sexuality in Inquisition has been commended by some sources for its avoidance of tokenism: MCV/Develop staff considers her character to be properly fleshed out and without the usual stereotypes of a poorly written or implemented LGBT character that exists simply to tick a box. Rella said Sera is not just another stereotypical angry lesbian, but a multi-layered character who requires patience to understand. She believed that Sera is one of the best-written characters in Bioware games, and that her character arc progressed in a realistic fashion across Inquisition's narrative. Rella liked that the focus is on Sera's character, actions and abilities, while her sexuality is a relatively minor part of her personality. Lucy O'Brien from IGN felt Sera was very "alive" and "three-dimensional" in the game, though she clashed with her Inquisitor character on numerous matters of principle. She disclosed that the aftermath of her character's relationship breakdown with Sera left her feeling "needy and gross and alone", but praised Bioware's integrity for not tying up Inquisition's romances in "neat little boxes", and for showing "a willingness to ditch the usual power fantasies in the pursuit of authenticity". On the other hand, Hylton alleged that the depiction of the lesbian relationship between the Inquisitor and Sera is "fetishized" and reinforces "some troubling stereotypes".

== See also ==
- Elves in fiction
- Media portrayal of lesbianism
