= Jian Yang (geneticist) =

Professor of statistical genomics

- Education: Zhejiang University
- Awards: Lawrence Creative Prize from the Centenary Institute (2012); Ruth Stephens Gani Medal from the Australian Academy of Science (2015); Frank Fenner Prize for Life Scientist of the Year from the Prime Minister of Australia (2017)
- Scientific career
- Fields: Statistical genetics
- Institutions: University of Queensland
- Thesis: Developing Methods and Software for Genetic Analysis of Complex Traits (2008)
- Doctoral advisor: Jun Zhu
- Other academic advisors: Peter Visscher

Jian Yang is a Chinese statistical geneticist and Professor of Statistical Genomics at the University of Queensland's Institute for Molecular Bioscience, as well as an affiliated professor at the Queensland Brain Institute. He received the 2015 Ruth Stephens Gani Medal for his research on the "missing heritability" of complex traits. In 2017, he received the Frank Fenner Prize for Life Scientist of the Year from the Prime Minister of Australia for his work on the basis of genetic variation in complex human traits, such as obesity and schizophrenia. He has researched the contribution of numerous single nucleotide polymorphisms to variation in quantitative traits, such as human height, as well as the role of natural selection in driving genetic variation in such traits. He and his colleagues have also used genetic data on common diseases to study potential environmental risk factors for them.
