= Nicki Packer =

Australian glycoscientist

Nicki Packer (also known as Nicolle Packer) FRSC is an Australian college professor and researcher. She currently serves as a distinguished professor of glycoproteomics in the School of Natural Sciences at Macquarie University and principal research leader at Griffith University's Institute for Glycomics. Packer is a Fellow of the Royal Society of Chemistry and in 2021 received the Distinguished Achievement in Proteomic Sciences Award from the Human Proteome Organization. Her research focuses on biological functional of glycoconjugates by linking glycomics with proteomics and bioinformatics. She was elected a Fellow of the Australian Academy of Science in 2026.

== Career ==
Packer's research focuses on glycoconjugates, a topic at the intersection of chemistry and biological sciences which aims to identify and study the function of the collection of glycoproteins, glycolipids and proteoglycans in cells and on cell surfaces. Her research program examines the structure, function and role of glycans in cancer and microbial infections, as well as their application in therapeutics.

Packer started her research career with a PhD from the University of Sydney in 1978. In 1999 she co-founded Proteome Systems Limited, an Australian biotech company which developed glycoanalytical technology and informatics tools. Packer became a professor at Macquarie University in 2007 and in 2017 became a distinguished professor and also became the principal research leader at the Institute for Glycomics at Griffith University.

Packer is academic lead of the Australian Proteome Analysis Facility at Macquarie University. In 2017 Packer co-founded the Human Glycoproteomics Initiative (HGI) as part of the Human Proteome Organisation (HUPO) and the Australian Glycoscience Society Glyco@Oz in 2019 to connect Australian glycoscientists. She was deputy director of Macquarie University's Biomolecular Discovery Research Centre.

Packer has had multiple roles in ARC-funded research centres, including:

- Chief investigator in The ARC Training Centre for Facilitated Advancement of Australia's Bioactives (FAAB) funded in 2021
- Chief investigator in the ARC Centre of Excellence in Synthetic Biology (CoESB), funded in 2020
- Associate investigator in the ARC Centre of Excellence for Innovations in Peptide and Protein Science (CIPPS), funded in 2020
- Chief investigator in the ARC Centre of Excellence in Nanoscale BioPhotonics (CNBP), funded in 2014
- Chief investigator in the ARC Industrial Transformation Training Centre for Molecular Technology in the Food Industry (ITTC), funded in 2013

== Awards and prizes ==
Packer's awards and prizes include:

- 2022 The Simpson Lecturer Award from the Australasian Proteomics Society
- 2021 The Distinguished Achievement in Proteomic Sciences Award from the Human Proteome Organization
- 2017 Distinguished Professor of Glycoproteomics at Macquarie University
- 2016 Gold Medal for International Genetically Engineered Machine (iGEM) project "Solar Synthesisers" (team advisor)
- 2015 Molecular and Cellular Proteomics (MCP) / American Society for Biochemistry and Molecular Biology (ASBMB) Lectureship Award
- 2015 Macquarie University Research Excellence Award for her work on understanding the role carbohydrates play in the spread of disease
- 2015 Gold Medal for International Genetically Engineered Machine (iGEM) project "Chlorophyll II: Return of the Hydrogen" (team advisor)

== Media ==
Packer's glycoproteomics work has been reported in The Toronto Star, The Age, BioSpectrum Asia and by the Royal Society of Chemistry. Her work with The Australian biotechnology company Proteome Systems was reported in the New York Times. Packer's work on the role of sugars in a wide range of human diseases was featured in the Macquarie University publication, The Lighthouse.

== Publications ==
Packer has published over 250 journal articles and book chapters, has over 12,000 citations and has an h-index of 61 (as at April 2022). Packer is an editor of the textbook Essentials of Glycobiology.

=== Selected journal articles ===
- Oliveira, Tiago; Thaysen-Andersen, Morten; Packer, Nicolle H.; Kolarich, Daniel (2021). "The Hitchhiker's guide to glycoproteomics". Biochemical Society Transactions. 49 (4): 1643–1662. doi: 10.1042/BST20200879. PMID 34282822.
- Varki, Ajit; Cummings, Richard D; Aebi, Markus; Packer, Nicole H; Seeberger, Peter H; Esko, Jeffrey D; Stanley, Pamela; Hart, Gerald; Darvill, Alan; Kinoshita, Taroh; Prestegard, James J (2015). "Symbol Nomenclature for Graphical Representations of Glycans". Glycobiology. 25 (12): 1323–1324. doi:10.1093/glycob/cwv091. PMID 26543186.
- Jensen, Pia H; Karlsson, Niclas G; Kolarich, Daniel; Packer, Nicolle H (2012). "Structural analysis of N- and O-glycans released from glycoproteins". Nature Protocols. 7 (7): 1299–1310. doi: 10.1038/nprot.2012.063.
- Cooper, Catherine A.; Gasteiger, Elisabeth; Packer, Nicolle H. (2001). "GlycoMod - A software tool for determining glycosylation compositions from mass spectrometric data". Proteomics. 1 (2): 340–349. doi: 10.1002/1615-9861(200102)1:2<340::AID-PROT340>3.0.CO;2-B.
- Thaysen-Andersen, Morten; Kolarich, Daniel; Packer, Nicolle H. (2021). "Glycomics & Glycoproteomics: From Analytics to Function". Molecular Omics. 17 (1): 8–10. doi: 10.1039/D0MO90019B.
- York, William S; Mazumder, Raja; Ranzinger, Rene; Edwards, Nathan; Kahsay, Robel; Aoki-Kinoshita, Kiyoko F; Campbell, Matthew P; Cummings, Richard D; Feizi, Ten; Martin, Maria; Natale, Darren A (2020). "GlyGen: Computational and Informatics Resources for Glycoscience". Glycobiology. 30 (2): 72–73. doi:10.1093/glycob/cwz080. PMID 31616925.
