= Ian Paulsen =

Australian microbiologist

Ian T. Paulsen is a tenured academic professor at Macquarie University. He is a microbiologist, synthetic biologist and scientist in the field of microbial genomics. His research has focused on characterisation of bacterial transport systems for nutrients and toxic compounds and he has discovered several classes of multidrug efflux pumps that can make bacteria resistant to several drugs by pumping them out of the cell.

Paulsen is currently the Director of the Australian Research Council Centre of Excellence in Synthetic Biology and works with Deputy Director Aleksandra Filipovska. Paulsen is a Fellow of the Australian Academy of Science and Fellow of the Royal Society of New South Wales. He is also a Chief investigator in the ARC Training Centre for Facilitated Advancement of Australia's Bioactives FAAB and a former ARC Laureate Fellow.

== Education ==
Paulsen received his PhD from Monash University in 1994 for his work on molecular analysis of multidrug resistance in Staphylococcus aureus.

== Career ==
Paulsen completed his postdoctoral research as an NHMRC C.J. Martin Fellow at the University of California, San Diego and later became a faculty member at the Institute for Genomic Research (TIGR) (2002–2007) and worked on microbial genome sequencing projects. In 2007, he moved back to Australia to work as a Professor at Macquarie University and currently serves as Distinguished Professor and the Director of the ARC Centre of Excellence in Synthetic Biology and Director of the Australian Genome Foundry. Paulsen won the 2025 Eureka Prize for Leadership in Science for his national impact in synthetic biology.

== Research ==
Paulsen's research has advanced understanding of membrane transport systems, microbial physiology and antibiotic resistance mechanisms. He has authored over 350 peer-reviewed publications, which have collectively garnered more than 100,000 citations, earning him an h-index of 139. His notable research contributions include leading genome sequencing projects for pathogens such as Brucella suis and the first complete genomes of Enterococcus, Pseudomonas fluorescens, and coastal Synechococcus. revealing key roles of lateral gene transfer and genomic adaptation in pathogenesis, biocontrol, and marine environmental specialisation. Recognised for his scientific impact, Paulsen was named one of the world's 3000 most influential scientific minds by Thomson Reuters in 2014. He has been honoured with several prestigious awards, including the 2024 NSW Premier’s Prize for Excellence in Biological Sciences. Paulsen’s genomic sequencing research was reported in the New York Times. His synthetic biology research has been reported in the Washington Post.

Paulsen was part of an international team constructing the world’s first synthetic yeast genome, "Yeast 2.0," by replacing natural DNA with chemically synthesised sequences to engineer microbes for industrial and environmental use; this was reported in ABC News. Paulsen is the co-leader of the Australian node of the Sc2.0 (Yeast 2.0) project, which successfully synthesised all 16 native chromosomes to produce the world’s first synthetic eukaryote. Paulsen was featured in articles appearing on Open Access Government and was featured in an Innovation Australia article highlighting the growth and diversification of the Australian bioeconomy beyond medicine, including advancements in synthetic biology. His work continues to shape the landscape of synthetic biology and microbial research in Australia and globally.
