= Alicia Oshlack =

Australian bioinformatician

Alicia Oshlack FAHMS
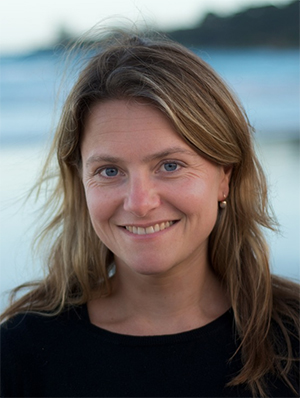
- Born: Alicia Yinema Kate Nungarai Oshlack; 1975 (age 50–51); Roleystone, Perth, Western Australia.
- Education: University of Melbourne (BSc, PhD)
- Known for: Genome wide expression profiling
- Awards: Ruth Stephens Gani Medal (2011), Millennium Award (2015)
- Scientific career
- Fields: Bioinformatics; RNA-seq; ChIP-seq; Clinical genomics
- Workplaces: University of Melbourne; Walter and Eliza Hall Institute; Murdoch Children's Research Institute; Peter MacCallum Cancer Centre
- Thesis: The central structure of radio quasars (2002)
- Website: oshlacklab.com

Alicia Yinema Kate Nungarai Oshlack is an Australian bioinformatician and is Co-Head of Computational Biology at the Peter MacCallum Cancer Centre in Melbourne, Victoria, Australia. She is best known for her work developing methods for the analysis of transcriptome data as a measure of gene expression. She has characterized the role of gene expression in human evolution by comparisons of humans, chimpanzees, orangutans, and rhesus macaques, and works collaboratively in data analysis to improve the use of clinical sequencing of RNA samples by RNAseq for human disease diagnosis.

== Early life and education ==
Alicia Oshlack was born in Roleystone, Perth in 1975. She graduated dux from Warrnambool College Victoria, Australia in 1993. She completed a Bachelor of Science (Hons) (1994–98) from the University of Melbourne, majoring in physics. She remained at the University of Melbourne to complete a PhD in astrophysics, which she completed on the topic of the central structure of radio quasars (1999–2003).

== Career ==
Oshlack made a career transition to apply her mathematics to genetics after moving to the Walter and Eliza Hall Institute, where she worked as a research officer (2003–07) and then senior research officer (2007–11) in the Bioinformatics Division. Oshlack moved to the Murdoch Children's Research Institute in Melbourne in 2011 to take up the post of Head of Bioinformatics. She was appointment as the co-chair of the Genomics and Bioinformatics advisory group for The Melbourne Genomics Health Alliance in 2013. She was also on the organising committee of Beyond the Genome in 2013. In 2019 Oshlack was appointed co-Head of Computational Biology at the Peter MacCallum Cancer Centre. She was elected a Fellow of the Australian Academy of Health and Medical Sciences in 2021. In 2022 she was nominated and highly commended in the Research Australia Frontiers Award.

== Research ==
=== Gene expression analysis ===
Oshlack's research has focused on methods for the analysis of genome expression, notably computational and statistical analysis of transcriptome data. This includes work on background correction methods for two-colour microarrays, normalisation of microarray data, comparative analysis of RNAseq data and normalisation of methylation patterns in human DNA beadchip data.

=== Human evolution ===
Oshlack's methodology has enabled gene expression levels between humans and other primates to be analysed in an unbiased manner. Her work comparing gene expression levels from liver tissues of five individuals from four different primate species: humans, chimpanzees, orangutans, and rhesus macaques, identified the rapid evolution of transcription factors in humans. Further related work looked at the expression level changes for these factor across multiple human tissues. For this work Alicia Oshlack was awarded the Ruth Stephens Gani Medal for Human Genetics from the Australian Academy of Science in 2011.

=== Clinical gene expression analysis ===
Oshlack has developed a software pipeline for performing clinical grade analysis of DNA sequencing data for diagnostic purposes. These tools are currently being used for the analysis of sequencing data in the diagnosis of cardiomyopathies at the Victorian Clinical Genetics Service. She has also developed tools for the analysis of tumour data, specifically detecting mutations caused by rearrangement of the tumour genome resulting in oncogenic fusion genes.

== Personal life ==
Oshlack's views on work life balance in science and communicating what bioinformaticians do to a general audience at parties have been published.
