= Mina Ryten =

British geneticist, consultant

- Education: University of Cambridge; University College London
- Scientific career
- Workplaces: University of Cambridge; University College London
- Thesis: Purinergic signalling in developing and regenerating skeletal muscle (2003)
- Academic advisors: John Hardy

Mina Ryten is a British geneticist who is Professor and Director of the Dementia Research Institute at the University of Cambridge. Her research uses human brain transcriptomics to understand neurological conditions. She was elected Fellow of the Academy of Medical Sciences in 2025.

== Early life and education ==
Ryten originally trained in medicine at the University of Cambridge, where she was a member of Clare College. She moved to University College London, where she started an MBPhD (an intensive research placement during an undergraduate medical degree). Her doctoral research considered purinergic signalling in skeletal muscle development.

Ryten worked as a junior doctor in the University College London Hospitals NHS Foundation Trust, and was awarded a clinical fellowship in neurology. After earning her doctorate, she was awarded a Medical Research Council postdoctoral fellowship, where she trained in bioinformatics and systems biology with John Hardy.

== Research and career ==
Ryten set up her own independent group at University College London in 2017. She moved into the UCL Institute of Child Health. She uses transcriptomic data as a genomic readout to better understand biological processes, and understand how RNA processing goes wrong in disease. She develops open access tools for human brain transcriptomic analysis, making it possible to visualise transcript structure, interrogate mitochondira-nuclear relationships and improve genetic diagnosis.

Ryten moved to the University of Cambridge as Director of the Dementia Research Institute in January 2024. She is interested in the interpretation of RNA sequences from human brain tissue to better understand neurodegenerative conditions. She is particularly interested in Lewy body diseases.

Ryten was elected to the Academy of Medical Sciences in 2025.

== Selected publications ==
- Adaikalavan Ramasamy; Daniah Trabzuni; Vibin Varghese; et al. (31 August 2014). "Genetic variability in the regulation of gene expression in ten regions of the human brain". Nature Neuroscience. 17 (10): 1418–1428. doi:10.1038/nn.3801. ISSN 1097-6256. PMC 4208299. PMID 25174004. Wikidata Q34398489.
- Alan E Renton; Elisa Majounie; Adrian Waite; et al. (20 October 2011). "A hexanucleotide repeat expansion in C9ORF72 is the cause of chromosome 9p21-linked ALS-FTD". Neuron. 72 (2): 257–68. doi:10.1016/j.neuron.2011.09.010. ISSN 0896-6273. PMC 3200438. PMID 21944779. Wikidata Q24634583.
- Jason L Stein; Sarah E Medland; Alejandro Arias Vasquez; et al. (15 April 2012). "Identification of common variants associated with human hippocampal and intracranial volumes". Nature Genetics. 44 (5): 552–561. doi:10.1038/ng.2250. ISSN 1061-4036. PMC 3635491. PMID 22504417. Wikidata Q36792668.
