= Warrnambool College =

School in Warrnambool, Victoria, Australia

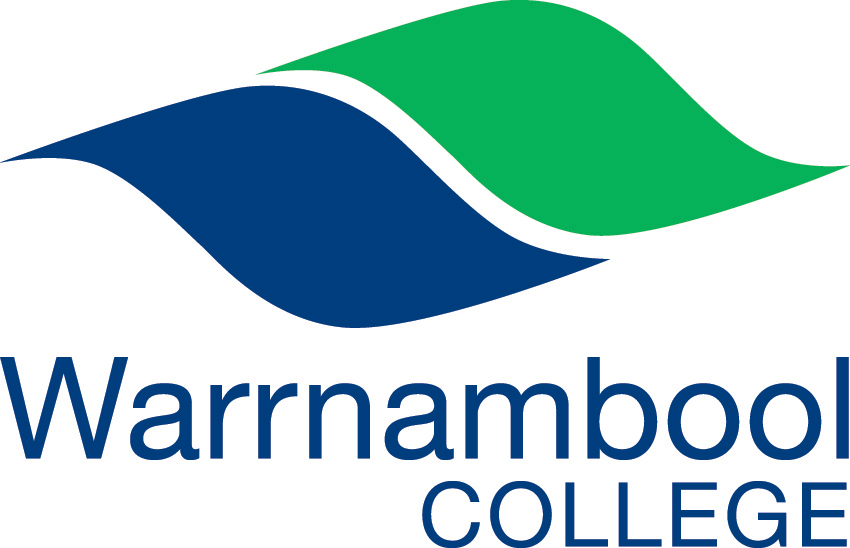

Location
- Warrnambool, Victoria; Australia; 38.3772°S 142.4994°E

Information
- Type: Government, co-educational, day school
- Motto: Every Warrnambool Student Thrives
- Established: 1907 (as Warrnambool Agricultural High School) opened 1995 as Warrnambool College
- Principal: David Clift
- Enrolment: 1300 (2022)
- Colours: Navy blue and green
- Website: www.wblcoll.vic.edu.au

Warrnambool College is a government high school (years 7–12) in the regional town of Warrnambool in south-west Victoria, Australia.

The school now known as Warrnambool College started out in 1907 as Warrnambool Agricultural High School. After a number of changes, the school opened as Warrnambool College in 1995 after the merger of Warrnambool Secondary College and Warrnambool North Secondary College.

Warrnambool College consists of two campuses. The main campus, which comprises the majority of the school community, is located in an extensive set of school buildings on Grafton Road, near the Warrnambool racecourse. The second campus, called the WAVE school, is an alternative educational setting for students who have had difficulty fitting into mainstream education. It is located in East Warrnambool.

== Houses ==
In 2011 Warrnambool College introduced a pastoral care system through six houses: Belfast, Childers, Flagstaff, Hopkins, Logans and Merri. These houses are named after local colonial named landmarks in the region, including the Merri and Hopkins Rivers Every year, a "celebration day" is held for each house, at different times of the year, in order to raise money for each house's charity. These houses were abolished for most uses for the 2026 academic year, being replaced with "sub-schools".

== School profile ==
Warrnambool College hosts a campus of the Clontarf Football Academy for male indigenous students. The staffing profile for the school (as at 2014) was – principal and two assistant principals, 85 full-time-equivalent teachers and 30 full-time-equivalent education support staff.

== School colours ==
The Warrnambool College school colours are navy blue, white and green, as displayed in the school uniform The houses that all staff and students are placed in as part of the pastoral care program have the following colours:

Belfast – Green

Childers – Yellow

Flagstaff – Red

Hopkins – Blue

Logans – Purple

Merri – Orange

== Controversy ==
In 2024, the school was brought before the Victorian Civil and Administrative Tribunal regarding student abuse towards teachers. VCAT has found that staff at the school at the time faced up to 20 violent and sexist attacks per day and that 70 have been responsible for these incidents.

== Notable alumni ==
- Sir John Eccles, Nobel Prize–winning scientist
- Ronald Mack, politician
- Hugh McCluggage, AFL Footballer
- Joe O'Connell, AFL Footballer
- Alicia Oshlack, bioinformatician
- Jamarra Ugle-Hagan, AFL Footballer
- Jay Rantall, AFL Footballer
- Wayne Schwass, AFL player
