= Robyn Addison =

English actress

- Born: 17 January 1984 (age 42); Belper, Derbyshire, UK
- Education: Clare College, Cambridge
- Occupation: Actress
- Spouse: Shane Zaza (m. 2016)

Robyn Addison (born 17 January 1984) is an English actress known for her roles in television series such as Doc Martin, Survivors and Casualty, as well as for providing the English voice of Y'shtola Rhul in the Final Fantasy series. She has numerous other television drama and theatre credits.

Addison portrayed Angela in the Zoo Venues production of Abigail's Party at the 2005 Edinburgh Festival.

== Roles ==
=== Television ===
| Year | Title | Role | Notes |
|---|---|---|---|
| 2007 | Dalziel and Pascoe | Katherine Hamilton | Episode: "Demons on Our Shoulders" |
| 2007 | The Street | Kirsty Blackwell | Episode: "The Promise" |
| 2008 | CASUAL+Y | Joanne Coldwell | 13 episodes |
| 2008–2010 | Survivors | Sarah Boyer | 11 episodes |
| 2009 | Inspector George Gently | Maggie Alderton | Episode: "Gently in the Blood" |
| 2009 | Lightning Strikes | Angel | TV Movie |
| 2010 | Waterloo Road | Anna | 2 episodes |
| 2012 | Secrets and Words | Stacey | Episode: "Mightier Than the Sword" |
| 2012 | Starlings | Lisa | 1 episode |
| 2013 | Great Night Out | Natalie | 1 episode |
| 2015–2022 | Doc Martin | Janice Bone | 19 episodes |
| 2022 | Father Brown | Elsie Peters | Episode: "The Enigma of Antigonish" |
| 2022 | The War Master | Gallia | 1 episode (voice) |

=== Video games ===
| Year | Title | Voice role | Notes |
|---|---|---|---|
| 2010 | Final Fantasy XIV | Y'shtola Rhul | English dub |
| 2014 | Grid Autosport | Voice | |
| 2014 | Dragon Age: Inquisition | Sera | |
| 2015 | Final Fantasy XIV: Heavensward | Y'shtola Rhul | English dub |
| 2015 | Dragon Age: Inquisition – Jaws of Hakkon | Sera | |
| 2015 | Dragon Age: Inquisition – Trespasser | Sera | |
| 2015 | Mobius Final Fantasy | Y'shtola Rhul | English dub |
| 2016 | World of Final Fantasy | Y'shtola Rhul | English dub |
| 2017 | Mass Effect: Andromeda | Nexus general merchant | |
| 2017 | Final Fantasy XIV: Stormblood | Y'shtola Rhul | English dub |
| 2018 | Dissidia Final Fantasy NT | Y'shtola Rhul | English dub |
| 2019 | Final Fantasy XIV: Shadowbringers | Y'shtola Rhul, Titania | English dub |
| 2019 | Anthem | Strider Driver's Girlfriend, Civilian | |
| 2020 | Assassin's Creed Valhalla | Kadlin, Augusta the Cheerful, Acha | |
| 2021 | Discovery Tour: Viking Age | Abbess Magdalena, Eadith | Add-on for Assassin's Creed Valhalla |
| 2021 | Final Fantasy XIV: Endwalker | Y'shtola Rhul, Nophica | English dub |
| 2022 | Warhammer 40,000: Chaos Gate - Daemonhunters | Kartha Vakir | |
| 2024 | Final Fantasy XIV: Dawntrail | Y'shtola Rhul | English dub |

=== Narrated books ===
- Collen, Alanna (2015). 10% Human: How Your Body's Microbes Hold the Key to Health and Happiness. William Collins. ISBN 0007584024.
- Denzil, Sarah A. (2020). You Are Invited:A Ghost Story. Sarah Dalton. ISBN 978-1916223530.
- Nour, Eva (2020). The Stray Cats of Homs. Doubleday. ISBN 0857526766.
- Bray, Carys (2020). When the Lights Go Out. Random House. ISBN 1473577071.
- Gray, Afsaneh (2023). The Other Woman. Audible Originals. ASIN B0DM4RZF41.
