= List of population genetics projects =

This is a list of population genetics projects.

== Multiple populations ==
- 1000 Genomes Project
- HapMap Project

== Population based projects ==
| Country | Name | Details | Reference |
|---|---|---|---|
| United Kingdom | UK10K | 4000 healthy British and 6000 with extreme health problems | |
| Netherlands | GoNL | 250 trios (father, mother and child) of Dutch descent | |
| South Africa | NA | 1 from Southern Kalahari, 3 from Northern Kalahari, 1 Bantu from South Africa | |
| Singapore | Singapore Genome Variation Project | 268 individuals from the Chinese, Malay, and Indian population groups in Southeast Asia | |
| Italy | SardiNIA Project | 2,000 sequenced Sardinian people | |
| Germany | PopGen (German) | Genotyping of 10,000 German people | |
| Ukraine | GenomeUkraine | Whole genome sequences of 97 Ukrainians from Ukraine | |

== See also ==
- List of genetics-related topics
