= Sarah Medland =

Australian geneticist

Sarah Medland OAM FAA FASSA FAHMS
- Born: Sarah Elizabeth Medland
- Education: University of Queensland
- Awards: 2017 Ruth Stephens Gani Medal
- Scientific career
- Fields: Psychiatric genetics
- Institutions: QIMR Berghofer Medical Research Institute
- Thesis: The genetic epidemiology of behavioural laterality (2006)

Sarah Elizabeth Medland is Professor and Psychiatric Genetics Group Leader at the QIMR Berghofer Medical Research Institute in Herston, Brisbane, Australia. She played a major role in the development of the ENIGMA brain imaging consortium.

== Honours and awards ==
In 2010, Medland received the Queensland Young Tall Poppy Science Award from the Australian Institute of Policy and Science. In 2011, she received the Fuller & Scott Award from the Behavior Genetics Association. In 2015, she was awarded the Theodore Reich Young Investigator Award from the International Society of Psychiatric Genetics. In 2017, she received the Ruth Stephens Gani Medal from the Australian Academy of Science. In October 2019, Medland was elected Fellow of the Australian Academy of Health and Medical Sciences (FAHMS). Also in 2019, she was elected Fellow of the Academy of the Social Sciences in Australia, while in 2020 she was awarded the Medal of the Order of Australia for "service to medical research in the field of genetics". She was elected a Fellow of the Australian Academy of Science in 2022.
