= Joseph Truman (minister) =

English clergyman and ejected minister, religious writer

Joseph Truman (1631–1671) was an ejected minister and metaphysician.

== Life ==
He was the son of Richard and Mary Truman, was born at Gedling, near Nottingham, and baptised there on 2 February 1630–1. His father, who held some public post in the place, got into difficulties by speaking disrespectfully of the ‘Book of Sports.’

Joseph was educated first by the minister of Gedling, and afterwards at the free school at Nottingham. He was admitted a pensioner at Clare College, Cambridge, on 9 June 1647, proceeded B.A. in 1650, and M.A. in 1654. He was made rector of Cromwell, Nottinghamshire, near Nottingham (probably by the assembly of divines, as his name does not appear on the institution books), some time after 4 December 1656, when the former ‘minister of Cromwell’ (Henry Trewman, instituted 27 July 1635) was buried. The similarity in the two names (or possibly identity with a variation in the spelling) suggests a family connection.

After the passing of the Act of Uniformity in 1662, Truman, according to Calamy, declined to read the whole of the service in the Book of Common Prayer, because, he said, there were ‘lies in it;’ to prove his assertion, he quoted the collect for Christmas Day, and pointed out that not only was the birth of Christ stated to have taken place on that day, but also on the following Sunday. The collect is said to have been amended in consequence, but in reality it had already been altered by the Savoy Conference in 1661. Truman's successor in the rectory was instituted on 3 November 1662.

After his ejectment he resided in Mansfield in order to be near his friend Robert Porter, and always attended the services of the established church. He refused, however, all offers of preferment, was frequently indicted for nonconformity, and was once unsuccessfully sued to an outlawry.

He died at Sutton, Bedfordshire on 19 July 1671, while returning home from visiting Richard Baxter; he was buried in the chancel of the church there on 21 July.

== Works ==
In 1669 Truman published anonymously his first work, The Great Propitiation, in which he endeavoured to explain the Apostle Paul's theory of justification without works. He attached to his work (also anonymously) A Discourse concerning the Apostle Paul's meaning of “Justification by Faith,” in which he maintained that it was not intended ‘to exclude repentance and sincere obedience from being a condition of our justification,’ but that they were indeed included in the meaning of the word ‘faith.’ The Great Propitiation reappeared in London in 1671, 1672, and 1843. On the appearance early in 1670 of Bishop Bull's Harmonia Apostolica, Truman felt that many of his positions were seriously assailed, and commenced at once to write an answer in English for private circulation. It was, however, published anonymously under the title of An Endeavour to rectify some prevailing Opinions contrary to the Doctrine of the Church of England (London, 1671). Truman's main contention was the all-sufficiency of the Mosaic law, which, he argued, was able not only to work true sanctification in man, but, if rightly interpreted, to insure eternal life. Interpreted as a law of grace, it was no type or shadow, but the very gospel itself, to which the Sermon on the Mount had added nothing essential, and which remained in force to the present day.

In the same year (1671), Truman, still with Bull's views in mind, published anonymously A Discourse of Natural and Moral Impotency, in which he contended that whereas natural inability excuses from blame or guilt in proportion to its extent, moral inability aggravates it in like proportion, consisting as it does in aversion of the will. The book was republished with the writer's name in 1675 and again in 1834. Bull answered Truman at some length in his Examen Censuræ, pp. 149 et seq.

Truman's writings all exhibit close, subtle argumentation. He was a man of unusual learning and untiring diligence and industry.
