= Ruth Stephens Gani Medal =

Annual award for research in human genetics

The Ruth Stephens Gani Medal has been awarded annually since 2008 by the Australian Academy of Science to recognise research in human genetics.

The award honours the contributions by Ruth Stephens Gani to human cytogenetics.

It is an early career award normally for Australian resident nominees up to ten years work post doctorate.

== Recipients ==
Source: Australian Academy of Science

Year	Recipient	Citation extract	Ref
2025	Ira Deveson	"Using new genomic technologies to improve the diagnosis of genetic disease."	
2024	Sonia Shah	Research has led to new insights into heart failure biology and shifted understanding of genetic risk factors for familial hypercholesterolemia, impacting patient management in the UK. Dr Shah’s current research focuses on understanding cardiovascular risk in understudied groups, such as women and genetically diverse groups, in whom current tools for identifying high-risk individuals are less accurate, with the goal of developing more effective tools for disease prevention in these groups and ensuring more equitable translation of genomics research.	
2024	Stephin Vervoort	Innovative approach to understand RNAPII regulation uses genome-wide analyses paired with computational methods. His work has resulted in ground-breaking discoveries of fundamental regulatory mechanisms of RNAPII-driven gene expression, uncovering how these are dysregulated in cancer, and which component can be targeted therapeutically in cancer.	
2022	Loic Yengo		
2021	Joseph Powell	Professor Powell’s research uses single cell sequencing technology to investigate why diseases arise in different cell types, and how early-stage diseases can be diagnosed and treated by targeting the specific disease driving cell populations.	
2020	Marina Pajic	Uses of genomic technologies to improve the understanding of how cancers develop, and become resistant to treatment.	
2019	Justin Wong	Made the significant discovery that the natural accurate positioning of gene spacers is important to control how genes are turned on or off. He has also discovered that a ‘punctuation mark’ called DNA methylation can instruct the accurate usage of spacer sequences. The work by Dr Wong uncovers a novel way to control gene expression with vast therapeutic potential for cancers and other genetic diseases.	
2018	Irina Voineagu	Significant contributions to the genetics of neurodevelopmental disorders, including work on molecular mechanisms of DNA instability, autism genomics and transcriptomics; elucidated the role of DNA repeat expansions in neurodevelopmental disorders as well as identified a novel syndrome of intellectual disability caused by mutations in the CCDC22 gene; identified networks of genes that showed altered expression in autistic brain tissue in the first landmark large-scale transcriptome study of autistic brain.	
2017	Sarah Medland	Neuroimaging genetics, Child & Adolescent Psychopathology and Women’s health; a leading role and was instrumental in the formation of the ENIGMA brain imaging genetics consortium, which is currently the largest brain imaging study in the world; significantly advanced the understanding of the ways that genetics influences the structure and function of the human brain.	
2016	Geoffrey John Faulkner	Leading researcher in the field of genomics, where computers can be combined with high-throughput machines to analyse the DNA found in individual human cells; he and his team have discovered unusual genetic changes in neurons associated with the activity of mobile DNA, a type of ‘jumping gene’; his work has major implications for healthy brain function, and may provide opportunities to better understand mental health and neurodegenerative conditions.	
2015	Jian Yang	Developed novel statistical analysis methods to show that individual differences between people for many characteristics are due to the cumulative effect of many genes; solved the problem that genes identified from recent large-scale genetic studies explained only a small part of the genetic basis of characteristics such as height or susceptibility to disease; distributed his software tools widely and many researchers now apply his statistical genetic methods to their data.	
2014	Ryan Lister	Development of key techniques to map the epigenome has made possible major advances in our understanding of its role in gene regulation in both plants and animals.	
2013	Aleksandra Filipovska	Significant contributions to the field of human mitochondrial gene expression; developed new technologies to investigate mitochondrial nucleic acids and the roles of proteins that regulate the expression of genes encoded on the mitochondrial DNA; discovered several mitochondrial proteins important for energy production and consequently cell health; developed new tools to modulate mitochondrial gene expression and potential therapeutics for the treatment of mitochondrial genome mutation disease.	
2012	Manuel Ferreira	Established the Australian Asthma Genetics Consortium, which recently carried out the largest asthma genetics study in Australia; identified a gene – the interleukin-6 receptor – that has a more active version and a less active version the finding suggests that a drug that reduces the activity of this gene – currently used to treat rheumatoid arthritis – may be effective in asthma.	
2011	Alicia Oshlack	Major advances in understanding human evolution and the biology of human genomes by comparing changes in gene expression levels between humans and apes; developed methodology specifically for gene expression analysis that can be applied to many aspects of human biology and medical genetics; pioneering analysis of new DNA sequencing technology for studying gene expression.	
2010	Stuart Macgregor	Developed new methods and tools to analyse a wide range of diseases, ranging from schizophrenia to cancer and glaucoma; known for his work in relation to gene mapping, having developed ways to analyse pooled DNA for large-scale genetic association studies, that has led to the discovery of a new genetic risk variant in melanoma.	
2009	Marnie Blewitt	Major advances in our understanding of epigenetics – how we silence or activate particular regions of DNA to orchestrate normal development and prevent disease; identified new epigenetic mechanisms that influence how geneticists interpret the inheritance of phenotypic traits; identified a new gene that regulates X-inactivation, the process by which expression of genes on the X-chromosome is equalised between male and female mammals, including humans.	
2008	Vanessa Hayes	Identifying genetic risk factors for cervical and colorectal cancer; demonstrated the importance of genetic polymorphisms in progression of HIV disease in the African population; providing a major stimulus to the effective use of human genetics in prevention and treatment of this disorder; identified genetic markers associated with an increased risk of prostate cancer and the prediction of prostate cancer outcome.	

== See also ==
- List of genetics awards
