= Stephanie Cragg =

British neuroscientist

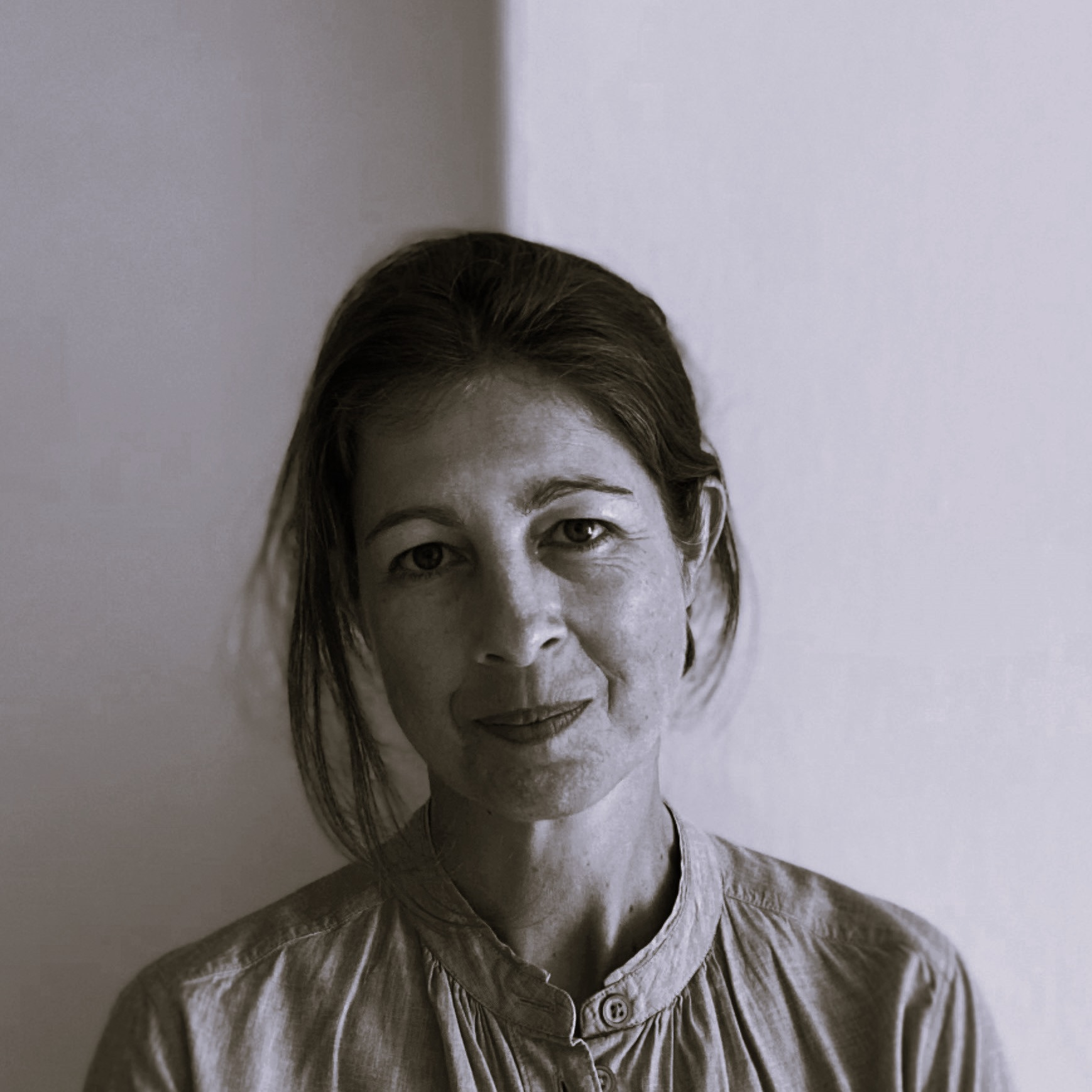
- Education: University of Cambridge; University of Oxford
- Scientific career
- Workplaces: University of Oxford

Stephanie J. Cragg (MA DPhil MAE) is a British physiologist who is Professor of Neuroscience at the University of Oxford. She holds a joint appointment as Professor in the Department of Physiology, Anatomy and Genetics, University of Oxford and as a Fellow (Official Student), Director of Studies and Tutor for Medicine at the college Christ Church, Oxford.

== Early life and education ==
Cragg studied Natural Sciences at Clare College, University of Cambridge, followed by a DPhil in neuropharmacology at the Department of Pharmacology, University of Oxford and Lincoln College, Oxford. Her graduate supervisors were Baroness Professor Susan Greenfield (Oxford) and Dr Margaret Rice (New York University).

== Research and career ==
Cragg is a neuroscientist at the University of Oxford. In her early postdoctoral research career, she was an E.P. Abraham Junior Research Fellow at St. Cross College, then an E.P. Abraham Research Fellow at Keble College, then received a Beit Memorial Fellowship followed by a Paton Research Fellowship from the Department of Pharmacology, University of Oxford. She was a visiting scientist at New York University Depts of Physiology & Biophysics, and Neurosurgery, and at the University of North Carolina at Chapel Hill. She took up post as Associate Professor in Biomedical Sciences in DPAG, in association with a Tutorial Fellowship at Christ Church in 2006, before being made full Professor in 2014. She received the honour of election to Membership of the Academia Europaea in 2026.

Her work focusses on understanding the functioning in health and disease of the brain's dopamine circuits and related cell types that become dysregulated in Parkinson's disease, addictions and other neurological and neuropsychiatric disorders. This work focusses particularly on the regulation of dopaminergic transmission.

Cragg's work includes the study of how dopamine release in the striatum is regulated by other neuronal circuits, non-neuronal cells (astrocytes), and neuromodulators, including the neurotransmitters acetylcholine, GABA, adenosine, and dysregulation in Parkinson's disease. Some of her most cited work relates to the axonal regulation of dopamine transmission by acetylcholine, cholinergic interneurons and nicotinic acetylcholine receptors (nAChRs). In 2025, she co-edited with Prof. Mark E. Walton The Handbook of Dopamine, a defining volume capturing current understanding of dopamine biology in the brain.

== Scientific leadership ==
=== Scientific journals ===
- Addiction Neuroscience
- ACS Chemical Neuroscience
- npj Parkinson's Disease

=== Societies ===
Engagement with scientific societies include:

- Election to Membership of the Academia Europaea (2026)
- President of the International Society for Monitoring Molecules in Neuroscience (2024-2026)
- College of Experts for Parkinson's UK

=== Keynote lectures ===
- European Journal of Neuroscience Special Feature Plenary Lecture, FENS Forum 2018, Berlin, Germany
- Keynote Speaker, ViDA 2020 - Virtual Dopamine Conference
- Swedish Basal Ganglia Society 2022
- Plenary Lecture, Dopamine 2022, Montreal, Canada
- 18^{th} International Conference on Monitoring Molecules in Neuroscience 2022, Lyon
- Doris Cecelia Levy Memorial Seminar on Brain Disease 2023, Jerusalem
- NeuroFrance 2025 Plenary Lecture, Montpellier, France
