= Emma Whitelaw =

Australian molecular biologist

- Awards: International Union of Biochemistry and Molecular Biology Jubilee Medal
- Scientific career
- Fields: Molecular biologist

Emma Whitelaw FAA is an eminent molecular biologist and NHMRC Australia Fellow at QIMR Berghofer and is among Australia's leading researchers of epigenetics. Whitelaw was the first to demonstrate epigenetic inheritance in mammals. She now currently works at La Trobe University in Australia.

== Biography ==
Whitelaw performed undergraduate studies at the Australian National University and obtained her D.Phil. from University of Oxford. She has worked for 15 years in London and Oxford, and since 1991 in Australia. She heads the Department of Population Studies and Human Genetics, dedicated to the study of epigenetics and mammalian gene expression, at Queensland Institute of Medical Research.

== Work ==
Whitelaw has worked extensively on the control of gene expression in higher eukaryotes. In 1999 Whitelaw, together with her co-workers made the first-ever demonstration of epigenetic inheritance in mammals.

== Awards ==
In 2008, Whitelaw was awarded a National Health and Medical Research Council (NHMRC) Australia Fellowship and in 2011 she became a Fellow of the Australian Academy of Science. In 2011, she received the Jubilee Medal from the International Union of Biochemistry and Molecular Biology for work on the transgenerational inheritance of epigenetic marks.
