= Aleksandra Filipovska =

Australian scientist

Professor Aleksandra Filipovska FAA FAHMS
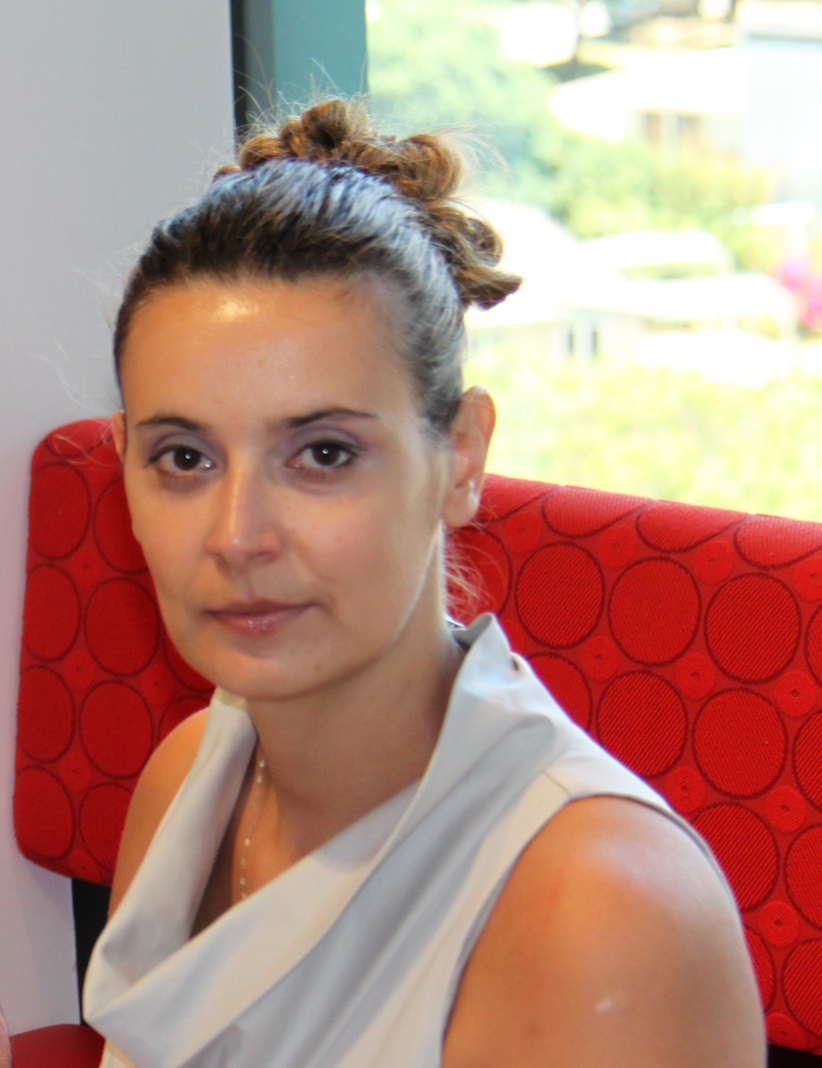

Personal details
- Occupation: Biochemist, molecular biologist

Aleksandra Filipovska is an Australian biochemist and molecular biologist. She is a professor, Deputy Director of the ARC Centre of Excellence in Synthetic Biology and NHMRC Investigator at the University of Western Australia, heading a research group at the Telethon Kids Institute. Specializing in biochemistry and molecular biology, she has made contributions to the understanding of human mitochondrial genetics in health and disease.

== Education and training ==
After graduating with a Bachelor of Science (with Honors, 1st Class) in 1998, Filipovska received her Ph.D. at the University of Otago, New Zealand in 2002. Between 2003-2005 she completed postdoctoral training as a New Zealand Foundation for Research, Science and Technology Fellow at the MRC Mitochondrial Biology Unit in Cambridge, the United Kingdom, before relocating to Australia in 2006 as a National Health and Medical Research Council of Australia (NHMRC) Howard Florey Fellow. From 2009-2014, she was an Australian Research Council (ARC) Future Fellow. She has been supported by an NHMRC Senior Research Fellowship from 2014 to 2024 and an NHMRC Investigator Grant since 2024 as well as project grants from the NHMRC and ARC.

== Research focus ==
Filipovska's research focuses on mitochondria, the 'powerhouses' that provide all human cells with energy. Dysfunction of mitochondria contributes to a variety of debilitating human diseases including neurodegenerative, cardiovascular and metabolic disorders, as well as cancer. During her graduate studies, Filipovska investigated how mutations in genes encoding for mitochondrial proteins can lead to disease, and developed new approaches to manipulate mitochondrial DNA replication and expression as potential therapies. During her postdoctoral work, she explored the use of compounds targeting mitochondria as a means to reduce oxidative stress in cells during aging and disease. Since establishing her research group at the Harry Perkins Institute of Medical Research and Telethon Kids Institute, Filipovska has continued to focus on molecular mechanisms that govern mitochondrial gene expression and protein synthesis and how defects in these processes can cause disease.

== Awards and prizes ==
Filipovska has been awarded the:

- 2018 Georgina Sweet Award for Women in Quantitative Biomedical Science
- 2016 The Genetics Society of AustralAsia Ross Crozier Medal
- 2014 Merck Millipore Research Medal from the Australian Society of Biochemistry and Molecular Biology;
- 2013 Ruth Stephens Gani Medal for research in human genetics from the Australian Academy of Science;
- 2012 Young Investigator Award from the Australia and New Zealand Society for Cell and Developmental Biology;
- 2011 WA Tall Poppy Award from the Australian Institute of Policy and Science, for excellence in science as well as involvement in science communication and outreach.

She was elected a Fellow of the Australian Academy of Health and Medical Sciences in 2022 and in 2026 was elected a Fellow of the Australian Academy of Science.
