= Survivors (2008 TV series) =

British 2008–2010 television series

- Survivors title sequence
- Genre: Post-apocalyptic drama
- Created by: Adrian Hodges; Terry Nation (novel)
- Starring: Julie Graham; Max Beesley; Freema Agyeman; Paterson Joseph; Zoë Tapper; Phillip Rhys; Robyn Addison; Nikki Amuka-Bird; Geraldine Somerville; Nicholas Gleaves; Chahak Patel; Jack Richardson; Emma Lowndes; Sacha Parkinson
- Country of origin: United Kingdom
- Original language: English
- No. of series: 2
- No. of episodes: 12

Production
- Running time: 60 minutes 90 minutes (Series 1 Episode 1)

Original release
- Network: BBC One; BBC HD
- Release: 23 November 2008 – 23 February 2010

Related
- Survivors

Survivors is a British science fiction television series produced by the BBC. It depicts the lives of a group of people who survived a virulent unknown strain of influenza which has wiped out most of the human species. According to the producers, the series is not a remake of the 1970s BBC television series Survivors (1975–1977), created by Terry Nation, but rather is loosely based on the novel of the same name that Nation wrote following the first series of the 1970s programme. Two series were produced of the new show: series 1 ran on BBC One and BBC HD in November–December 2008, and series 2 ran in January–February 2010, ending with a cliffhanger. The BBC announced on 13 April 2010 that due to poor viewing figures Survivors had been cancelled.

The series premiered in South Africa on BBC Entertainment, in September 2009, in France on DTTV channel NRJ 12 on 12 January 2010, on BBC America in the United States on 13 February 2010, and in Australia on Channel Nine, on 21 March 2010.

== Synopsis ==
Set in the 2000s, the series focuses on a group of ordinary people who survive the aftermath of a devastating viral pandemic – referred to as "European flu" – which kills most of the world's population by causing cytokine storms in the body's immune system. The series sees the characters struggling against terrible dangers in a world with no society, no police, and no law, led by the de facto matriarch of the group, Abby Grant.

== Production ==
Sue Hogg, an executive producer at the BBC, was inspired to remake Survivors following the recent increase in concerns about future pandemics and diseases such as SARS. It was decided that the show would be a re-imagining of the 1970s material made by BBC Productions rather than an external production company. The BBC pursued the rights for Survivors from Terry Nation's estate so that the series could be revived. The agreement, which was signed in 2007, took months of negotiations. For legal reasons, the new series is billed as being based on Nation's novelisation of material from his episodes of the 1970s series.

In remaking the series, Adrian Hodges worked to avoid criticisms of the 1970s series, and he felt it was "important that a new version had a cultural and class mix that really represented the country as it is now"; to meet their needs, they created two new characters, Al and Najid. The writers claimed that the new series retained the "spirit" of the 1970s show, but Hodges concentrated on the hope and the humanity in what was said to be an attempt to make it "less depressing" to watch.

The city scenes in the first series were filmed in Manchester, while city scenes in the second series were filmed in Birmingham.

To help create a world with no people, some scenes were shot very early on a Sunday morning, including a sequence where Al Sadiq drives his car at speed around the city centre. Producer Hugh Warren said this approach reduced the amount of computer-generated imagery required and allowed the budget to be spent on effects such as when the city starts to flood and burn. Other locations included a house near Helmshore in Lancashire, which doubled as the survivors' main base; the disused Earth Centre in the village of Denaby Main near Doncaster; and the Jaguar Cars test track in Nuneaton, which stood in for deserted motorways.

The series was shot using 35 mm film. Warren said this was chosen over high-definition video cameras due to the low light levels that would be experienced when filming in a world without electricity and during an autumn filming period, and over Super 16 due to high-definition transmission requirements.

The first series received a mixed critical reception, with some reviewers concerned that it was too derivative and predictable, while others were more positive. The producers were happy to have started well, survived the ratings lull in the middle, and ended with an upward curve in the last two weeks. Audience breakdowns indicate that a higher proportion of younger viewers were tuning in to Survivors than many other shows.

The second season of Survivors was delayed because of the real-life swine flu pandemic in 2009 and thus was broadcast in 2010.

== Cast and characters ==
=== Main ===
- Julie Graham as Abby Grant. The protagonist and moral compass of the group, she's determined to find her missing son Peter, who she insists throughout the series has survived the pandemic. She strives to maintain peace and welcome new arrivals. She and Peter are found to be the only characters to have survived the virus without a pre-existing immunity, which makes them of paramount importance to a shadowy consortium of companies that released the virus and is seeking a cure.
- Max Beesley as Tom Price. Price was serving a long prison sentence at Wandsworth prison when the virus struck. He escapes after killing the sole remaining guard and makes his way home, only to discover that his mother had also died during the pandemic. Price's remorselessness and violent streak provide an element of friction within the group, though he is often proven right about the darker side of human nature. Largely through his relationship with Anya, Tom becomes quite loyal to the group. At the close of the second series (and the programme), Tom has secreted himself aboard a consortium aeroplane bound for parts unknown.
- Paterson Joseph as Greg Preston. Greg first encounters Abby on the motorway. His original wish is to be self-sufficient and alone, but as Abby convinces the other survivors to come together he decides to remain within the group. Greg is shown to be better prepared than most to survive in this post-virus world, having immediately assembled a range of necessities. Before the pandemic kill-off, Greg's wife had left him for a civil servant and had told Greg she was visiting Boston. At that point, she and their two children vanished. Greg later discovered that his wife possibly knew about the virus before the outbreak and might have escaped it.
- Zoe Tapper as Dr. Anya Raczynski. Anya was a doctor in a busy city hospital when the virus struck and watched hundreds of patients die of the virus, including her friend and lover Patricia Kelly, and Patricia's flatmate Jenny Walsh. After treating a badly wounded Tom on the road, she joins the group. She privately discloses that, in the face of the pandemic, her faith in practicing medicine was deeply shaken, and she had initially sought to kill herself. Only later does she regain her confidence to successfully deliver a breech birth infant.
- Phillip Rhys as Al Sadiq. The son of an immensely wealthy man, Al lived a life of leisure before the pandemic and has had difficulty adapting to a life without modern conveniences. He finds Najid alone in the city and soon develops a paternal relationship with the boy. He has a close relationship with Sarah and grows despondent when she dies from a mutated strain of the virus near the end of the second series. He volunteers for the experimental vaccine and survives.
- Chahak Patel as Najid Hanif. Najid is an 11-year-old Muslim boy. He awakens in a mosque to find the entire congregation, including his parents, dead. He meets Al, and the pair join the group. He had relatives in Blackburn but doesn't know if they survived the pandemic. Shown to be a friendly, considerate child, Najid is adopted into the group with the most ease and forms especially close bonds with Abby and Al.
- Robyn Addison as Sarah Boyer. Before the virus, Sarah was an opportunist, manipulating men into supporting her. She joins the group after meeting Greg and eventually begins a relationship with Al. After stumbling upon an elderly couple with a new strain of the virus she is quarantined, but is infected and dies.
- Nikki Amuka-Bird as The Rt Hon Samantha Willis MP. One of the main antagonists of the first series, Willis – formerly the junior minister responsible for the government's media response to the virus – is the sole governmental official remaining. She moves into a small ecopolis, and seeks to establish a provisional government and restore order. Abby notes that Willis's methods are harsh and, ultimately, corrupt. This is signified, for example, by Willis's killing a woman found guilty of invading the ecopolis to steal food, as well as by her overruling a jury's finding of not guilty and giving the prisoner over to slave labour. She eventually forms a doomed alliance with Dexter, a violent gang leader who had been threatening her community.

=== Supporting ===
While some characters were emphasised in the BBC promotional material, such as Freema Agyeman, most only appeared in the first episode as perishing during the viral pandemic.

- Anthony Flanagan as Dexter. A vicious thug whom the group initially encounters while foraging for supplies. He claims grocery stores and later warehouses as part of his turf. Later he joins with Samantha's provisional government, seeking to eventually assume leadership of it. Cold and ruthless, he is killed by Tom, to whom Samantha has promised an opportunity to "escape", in return for his eliminating Dexter, who was a threat to her power.
- Nicholas Gleaves as Dr. James Whitaker. Whitaker serves as the main antagonist of the second series. He is a biochemist leading the research into a cure for the virus from the safety of a biologically secure research and development facility. As the research begins to require increasingly unethical practices, he lies and rationalises in the struggle to maintain the loyalty of his colleagues. Unbeknownst to the other workers (all of whom had lost loved ones in the pandemic), he had secreted his wife (portrayed by Alisa Arnah) and young son within the facility, violating protocol. His true motives are suspect, as he answers to someone called Mr. Landry, with whom he communicates over a satellite video link. Until his death he was using stolen anti-virus produced from Abby's blood for himself, keeping it from the others, who died when the virus got into the lab after Abby infected his wife. At the end of the second series, he is accidentally shot and killed by a sniper in Landry's employ.
- Christopher Fulford as Henry Smithson. A former Oxford professor of classical history, he has found a new career in managing forced slave labour at an old coal mine near the country manor where he has taken up residence (he justifies this by citing slavery in ancient Rome and Greece, saying every civilization has been built on it). He is last seen begging for mercy while being beaten to death by the slaves released by Tom (whom he also had enslaved).
- Roger Lloyd-Pack as Billy Stringer. A truck driver who kidnaps people he "befriends" along the road to work as slaves in Smithson's coal mine, in exchange for food and lorry fuel. Tied up and left in the woods by Tom, he is subsequently freed by Peter Grant, one of the children he had been transporting in the back of the truck. Lloyd-Pack is the only actor who appeared in the 2008 version who also appeared in the 1970s series; he played Wally in the Series 2 episode of the 1970s programme, titled "Lights of London" (1976).
- Patrick Malahide as Mr. Landry. He is part of a company which specialises in pharmaceutical research, which Whitaker was also once a part of; the pair would meet occasionally over a satellite video link to discuss further advancements. The group, following the details on a mysterious postcard, finds Landry, who admits that the virus is a genetically-engineered attempt to discover a universal cure for all known forms of influenza; it failed and escaped into the populace, creating the pandemic. Landry plans to take Peter Grant to a place where civilisation had been established months before, but is offered the newly created vaccine as an alternative. At the end of Series Two, he is heading back to this place via aeroplane.
- Jack Richardson as Peter Grant. Peter is Abby's young son. Unseen during the first series, he is unknowingly set free from Billy and a group of children his age. Billy finds him again and takes him to Dr. Whitaker, who uses him to find a cure for the virus, as he inherited his mother's ability to fight off the infection. He is reunited with his mother at the cliffhanger ending at the close of the second series.
- Freema Agyeman as Jenny Walsh. She is a young primary school teacher who lived with Patricia and was good friends with Anya before the virus, who dies shortly after discovering the true power of the disease. She appears in the first episode of Series One.
- Shaun Dingwall as David Grant. He is Abby's husband and Peter's father. When Abby contracts the virus and collapses, David cares for her until he believes that she has succumbed to the virus. When she awakens three days later, she discovers that David has died from the same flu that almost claimed her life.
- Sacha Parkinson as Kate. Greg and Tom see a helicopter flying over. They encounter an uninfected family who have been isolated since the onset of the virus, but when the family's daughter (Kate) reaches out to them, she risks infecting them. She appears in the third episode of Series One.

== Episodes ==
=== Series 1 (2008) ===
No. overall	No. in series	Title	Directed by	Written by	Original release date	UK viewers (millions)
1	1	"Episode 1"	John Alexander	Adrian Hodges	23 November 2008	6.97
As the "European Flu" virus spreads throughout the world, governments realise the scale of the problem. In just a few days, millions of people fall ill, including Abby Grant, Jenny Collins and her friend Patricia. The government minister in charge of the pandemic, Samantha Willis, MP, is told that at least 90% of the world's population will die. The virus is extremely virulent and kills the vast majority of the human race, leaving a small number of survivors who are either naturally immune or have caught the virus and recovered. Civilisation comes to a stop: broadcast media goes off the air, and the National Grid shuts down, leaving the country in darkness. The final national television broadcast is from Samantha Willis, who addresses the nation and urges the populace to keep calm and to wait for the government to retake control of the situation. Beneath her calm demeanour, however, she is fully aware of the catastrophic effects of the pandemic worldwide. One morning Al Sadiq, Anya Raczynski, Najid Hanif, and Tom Price awaken, they find everyone around them dead, and they struggle to find any fellow survivors. Abby awakens from her illness, to find that her husband David did not survive. She begins her search for her missing son Peter, believing he may also have survived. Eventually, the characters meet and realise they are going to have to stick together to survive. Note: A 90-minute episode.
2	2	"Episode 2"	Andrew Gunn	Adrian Hodges	25 November 2008	5.99
When the survivors go out for supplies from the local supermarket, they are confronted by armed thugs, led by the violent Dexter, who threaten to kill them if they return. Greg finds a warehouse containing a lifetime stock of food, a young woman called Sarah, and her injured companion, Bob. Al and Najid scavenge for supplies at some other shops in the area, where Al accidentally kills a surviving shopkeeper, before they return to the house with some live chickens.
3	3	"Episode 3"	Andrew Gunn	Gaby Chiappe	2 December 2008	5.22
Greg and Tom encounter an uninfected family who have been isolated since the onset of the virus. When the family's daughter reaches out to them, Greg and Tom realise with horror that they have exposed her to the virus. They propose taking her with them so that she will not infect her family, but in the end, her father (Neil Dudgeon) risks infection to keep her with them. Abby, in a search for her son, encounters Samantha Willis, the last surviving government minister, who is now in charge of a fledgling community that has hot water, food, light, and power. Initially, the two women bond, but Abby is appalled when she sees the lengths to which Samantha will go if she thinks her community is endangered. In a research lab, scientists are trying to develop a vaccine for the virus.
4	4	"Episode 4"	Iain B. MacDonald	Simon Tyrrell	9 December 2008	5.42
Abby travels to Waterhouse, a nearby manor, and inadvertently joins a land dispute between an aggressive group of teenage boys and Jimmy Garland, whose family owns the house. Tom, Al, Sarah and Najid find themselves attracted to the comfort and security within Samantha Willis' community, but Al falls foul of Samantha and is ejected. Tom struggles to prove himself to Samantha, a task complicated by his criminal past. Meanwhile, Anya and Greg confront some unwelcome visitors and learn some useful lessons about group solidarity.
5	5	"Episode 5"	Iain B. MacDonald	Adrian Hodges	16 December 2008	5.62
Suspicions are aroused when visionary spiritual leader John (Kieran O'Brien) turns up at the community's door with his ragged group of disciples. When Abby allows Linda, a pregnant woman from John's group, to stay with them until the baby is born, Anya fears that she will be forced to reveal that she is a doctor. After facing her personal demons, particularly over the death of Jenny Collins, Anya goes on to successfully deliver a breech birth. She becomes concerned for the group's safety after John becomes increasingly erratic. John proves to be a paranoid schizophrenic. In the research facility, the scientists tune into video messages recorded and broadcast by Samantha's group. One of them features Abby describing how she contracted the virus but survived. The scientists make it a high priority to find Abby and bring her to the facility for research.
6	6	"Episode 6"	Jamie Payne	Adrian Hodges	23 December 2008	4.65
Samantha Willis has expanded the scope of her community, employing armed thugs, including the violent Dexter. After Sarah reveals that Anya is a doctor, they kidnap Anya. Tom rescues her and kills Gavin, one of Samantha's men, and lets another one return to Samantha to bear witness. Abby and the others are forced to abandon their initial settlement, knowing that Samantha's people will come after Tom. Najid goes missing in the city, and the others look for him. While there, he meets Darren, a feral boy, and a community of other children under the protection of Craig and June, a sinister couple of adults. Greg is shot by Dexter, and Abby is kidnapped by a squad of armed men from the Lab. At the episode's end, a young boy is seen picking up a bag of belongings marked Peter Grant, and a horseback rider is shown looking for him.

=== Series 2 (2010) ===
A second series of six episodes was commissioned and began airing in January 2010. Adrian Hodges returned to oversee the project, and Julie Graham, Paterson Joseph, Zoe Tapper, Philip Rhys, Robyn Addison, Chahak Patel, and Max Beesley returned to their roles for the next series.

The cliffhanger is quickly resolved, while the story of the lab plays through Series Two, telling more about the backstory of the virus and the lab's direct connection with that. The production team's intention was to spend more time exploring the details of survival in the post-virus world and how the various characters cope.

Filming took place in various locations around Birmingham including Baskerville House (exterior) and the former ITV Central studios (interior) standing in for a fictional hospital.

No. overall	No. in series	Title	Directed by	Written by	Original release date	Viewers (millions)
7	1	"Episode 1"	Jamie Payne	Adrian Hodges	12 January 2010	5.16m
Abby has been kidnapped. Anya tries to remove the shotgun pellets from Greg, who is badly wounded, but she lacks medical equipment. She leads Al and Tom to a burning hospital. When the hospital collapses, Anya and Al are trapped. Tom brings Najid and Sarah to help, but they can't move the rubble. Another group of survivors arrives and helps. Meanwhile, Abby is interviewed by Whitaker, the leader of the laboratory scientists. Abby agrees to undergo medical experiments to help find a cure for the virus. Meanwhile, Sarah goes to see a brutal gang boss who agrees to provide lifting equipment in exchange for sexual favours. Abby is released from her confinement by a disillusioned scientist, but they are both quickly recaptured by Whitaker (who is revealed to have kept his wife, Jill, and infant son alive despite telling everyone they were dead). Anya and Al are freed from the rubble. With the medical supplies, Greg is saved. But the next day, Greg says he will leave if Tom stays, as he knows Tom killed a man in cold blood. Tom leaves the group.
8	2	"Episode 2"	Jamie Payne	Gaby Chiappe	26 January 2010	3.61 (overnight)
With Abby still missing and Greg recovering from his injuries, the Family are left scavenging for survival in the city. While Naj leaves graffiti messages for Abby, Tom steals supplies from other survivors. Greg and Naj find themselves attacked by the group Tom stole from, but Tom reappears in time to help. The Family learn that more people have been abducted as Abby was, and that the kidnappers' vans bear the markings of a known pharmaceutical company. In the Lab itself, Whitaker has Abby injected with a mutated strain of the virus, and he will stop at nothing to find his miracle vaccine. His wife Jill, desperate to escape confinement, absconds from her locked quarters and discovers Abby and later, imprisoned and deceased test subjects. Abby explains to her that everyone outside the lab is dead, including the government, and that she is being experimented on in search for a cure. Jill overhears her husband's plans for Jill and, unable to cope with the news, Jill releases Abby, who escapes from the building. Jill is arrested by the guards and put under quarantine. Whitaker struggles to maintain his authority over his rebellious staff, who are infuriated by the news that he has hidden his family in the laboratory. He advises the sinister Mr. Landry (his boss) about the loss of Abby and is ordered by him to ensure she is returned promptly.
9	3	"Episode 3"	David Evans	Simon Tyrrell	2 February 2010	3.89 (overnight)
The Family has stopped at a cottage to allow Abby time to recover, when they meet a travelling trader called Billy. Later, at the eco-compound, Billy passes on to Samantha Tom and the group's location, and she orders her henchmen to arrest Tom, intending to put Tom on trial for killing Gavin. Abby leads Greg and Anya after them, and takes on the role of defence counsel, while Greg and Anya become members of the jury. In a surprise power grab, Samantha's head thug Dexter votes "not guilty" and publicly denounces Samantha's style of leadership. Samantha overrules the jury's vote, declares Tom guilty, and announces that Tom is set to be imprisoned at an undisclosed location. Samantha secretly visits Tom and offers him freedom if he will kill Dexter. He does but is immediately captured by Samantha's men. Meanwhile, Greg and Al have arrived in an attempt to free Tom. Greg is captured along with Tom, but Al escapes.
10	4	"Episode 4"	David Evans	Jimmy Gardner	9 February 2010	3.82 (overnight)
Tom and Greg are enslaved alongside dozens of other men in Mr. Smithson's coal mine. Meanwhile, the Family are desperately hunting for them. They encounter Billy again, and he invites them to his home base, a roadside inn. He introduces his girlfriend, Sally, who offers them food and drink. When questioned about Tom and Greg, Billy feigns ignorance and exits under the pretence of asking around while on his trading route, leaving the Family with Sally. Sarah forms a bond with Sally, and when a carload of men arrives at the inn, Sally warns the Family to hide. She reveals that Billy brings people to the inn in order to sell them into slavery. She also reveals that Tom and Greg are being held at the nearby mine and reluctantly agrees to help free them. Greg gets himself promoted from slave to enslaver by convincing Smithson that he is a geologist and more valuable as management than as labor. Unfortunately, Abby inadvertently exposes him. The Family is captured and enslaved, and Greg is sentenced to death. Meanwhile, Tom has escaped. He hijacks Billy's truck, ties Billy to a tree, and returns to the mine in time to save Greg. He frees the slaves, who take brutal revenge on their enslavers. The Family rescue Sally and depart. The episode ends with a young boy freeing Billy from his bonds. The boy is revealed to be Peter Grant.
11	5	"Episode 5"	Farren Blackburn	Simon Tyrrell	16 February 2010	N/A
Reunited and on the road, the Family travel south on the lookout for a new home. They encounter a small but thriving community of survivors and accept their offer of hospitality. Al and Sarah enjoy their new romance. Tom simmers as Anya makes friends with the new community's leader, Judy. But Tom's anger is short-lived when his relationship with Anya takes a dramatic twist. Greg and Abby leave together to follow up Greg's suspicions about a mysterious postcard, which leads them to an abandoned airfield. There they meet the mysterious Mr Stevens (Kevin Doyle), who ends up committing suicide in front of them. Sarah discovers a family who are sick with a new mutant strain of the virus and quarantines herself with them. As Al keeps an anguished vigil outside the house, Sarah falls ill. Abby eventually enters the house, finds Sarah dead inside, and sets the house on fire. Concerned about the new strain of the virus, the Family visit the Lab where Abby was reinfected. They find the Lab full of dead scientists. Watching one of the security monitors, Abby sees her son approach the entrance of the Lab, and she sprints outside to look for him.
12	6	"Episode 6"	Farren Blackburn	Adrian Hodges	23 February 2010	N/A
In mourning over the loss of one of their own, and with a new strain of the virus set to take hold, the Family find themselves battling on all fronts. They convene in the ruined Lab, discovering that Fiona has survived the outbreak of the virus. A vaccine is more important now than ever, and Fiona and Anya work to create it. But Abby's only concern is to find her son, Peter, previously glimpsed briefly outside the Lab. Al, believing that he has nothing left to lose, volunteers himself to test the vaccine. Meanwhile, Whitaker, who has survived off the serum culled from Abby's blood, continues to hamper the Family's plans with lies and deceptions. He is eventually captured and held hostage in one of the test rooms within the ruined lab. Abby urges Tom to get him to tell her where Peter is, whatever the cost, but to no avail. Fiona helps Whitaker escape, but as the two make their way to the caravan site where Peter is hiding, Peter inadvertently shoots and kills Fiona with the gun Whitaker gave him for protection. Whitaker takes Peter and attempts to flee but is stopped in his tracks by Tom, who tries to urge Peter to come with him by telling him his mother is looking for him. The situation is too much for Peter to bear, and he fires the gun a second time, causing a nearly fatal consequence. Whitaker flees with Peter once again with the group hot on their trail, leading them to the abandoned airbase for a deadly showdown with the mysterious Landry, who informs the group that his pharmaceutical firm developed the genetically engineered influenza vaccine that mutated into the virus. Peter is about to be taken on the aeroplane with Landry, but Whitaker is killed, and Landry leaves, with Abby and Peter reunited. While the family begin the search for Tom, he has already managed to sneak onto Landry's aeroplane for the closing shot of him stowed-away on board with a machine gun.

== Series 1 DVD extras ==
- Making of featurette
- Character profiles
- Effects reel
- Easter egg

On disc one the Easter egg can be revealed by going to the main menu, highlighting episode selection then when the grey corpuscle appears press up and the corpuscle selects. This reveals around nine to ten minutes of behind the scenes footage.

== Media ==
Cover of re-released edition of Survivors novel

To tie in with the broadcast of the series Terry Nation's 1976 novelisation was released as a new edition by Orion Books. The 2008 series is credited as being based on this novel.

Screenshot of BBC Survivors Interactive website

A website was launched to tie in with the series, entitled "Survivors Interactive", which included interviews with actors, clips from the programme and original character pieces-to-camera. The interactive component was based on visitors selecting characters from the show and then answering either/or dilemma-based questions, which are then profiled by what type of survivor they would make as they travel through the post-plague environment.

The first series was released by 2 Entertain Video on DVD on 26 January 2009, and includes special features such as an Easter egg, A New World – The Making of Survivors documentary, character profiles and a Survivors Special Effects featurette.

In 2013, when the show was added to the Netflix platform, it was the highest watched program and consequently, Netflix were in contact with the BBC for discussions on continuing the program. Nothing since has been heard of this rumour.

Classic TV Press published the book Worlds Apart: an unofficial and unauthorised guide to the BBC's remake of Survivors (March 2010), written by Rich Cross, shortly after transmission of the second series completes. The book incorporates: in depth synopses and reviews for all the episodes from Series 1 and 2; insights into the making of the series; examination of the similarities and differences between the new series and the 1970s series; a photographic guide to filming locations; and exclusive production shots.

== Differences from the source material ==
In the credits, the re-imagined series is said to be based on the 1976 novel by Terry Nation; however, there are a number of differences between the series and its source material. In the novel, Jenny Richards survives, whereas her counterpart in the 2008 series, Jenny Collins, does not; this means that Greg Preston and Jenny cannot have a child as the years unfold. Abby Grant still falls in love with Jimmy Garland; however, in the book, he eventually dies from septicaemia.

There is a Tom Price in the 1970s novelisation and series. However, in the novelisation, he was a Welsh tramp who witnessed the climactic accidental killing of Abby Grant by her son, Peter. In the television series, he was an escaped convict who joined Abby's community.

The television characters Anya Raczynski, Najid Hanif, and Al Sadiq have no direct counterparts in the book. Samantha Willis does not appear in the book, either, but her television characterisation incorporates and parallels some of the personality and leadership ambitions of the book character Arthur Wormley, a "ruthless former trade union leader," who establishes a paramilitary organisation called the National Unity Force which is responsible for Abby's community's eventual decision to leave Britain for the Mediterranean in the latter chapters of the novelisation.

At the end of the book, Peter Grant, who has joined a nomadic gang of feral adolescents, accidentally shoots and kills Abby, whom he has not seen for the last four years. However, at the end of the incarnation of Survivors series 2, Peter shoots but doesn't kill Tom, and Abby is finally reunited with Peter, without her accidental death.

The television portrayal of Sarah Boyer is probably the closest character to her portrayal in the novelisation. In the book, her companion was named Vic, not Bob, and in the 1970s series, she was named Anne Tranter. Vic's fate is not revealed in the novelization, but it can be inferred that he starved to death. In the 2008 television series, Bob survives his initial abandonment. In the 1970s series, Anne (Sarah in the 2008 version) leaves during Episode 11; in the 2008 version, she dies from a mutated version of the virus.
