= List of HGSA Orations =

The HGSA Oration was established in 1990 in order to honour a pre-eminent member of the Human Genetics Society of Australasia (HGSA). It is a lecture given by a senior member of the HGSA who has contributed significantly to the profession over many years. The oration is given annually at the Annual Scientific Meeting of the HGSA.

| Year | Orator | Oration Title |
|---|---|---|
| 1990 | Anthony C Pollard AM | Birth and adolescence of the HGSA and its sibling 'ACH Chem-Path' |
| 1991 | O. Margaret Garson AO | Seven little Australians |
| 1992 | David M. Danks AO | What we can do/What we should do |
| 1993 | Richard Cotton AM | Detection of mutations in DNA |
| 1994 | Peter Fitzgerald | A human perspective |
| 1995 | Gillian Turner AM | The X chromosome and intelligence |
| 1996 | Grant R Sutherland AC | Fragile sites: from medium 199 to dynamic mutation |
| 1997 | Bridget Wilken AM | Mild disease carriers and problems with screening |
| 1998 | John Rogers AM | From medical genetics to psychotherapy and back again |
| 1999 | William (Bill) Carey PSM | Lysosomes, peroxisomes and other very important matters |
| 2000 | Dianne Webster ONZM | Newborn screening quality – lessons from the past |
| 2001 | Sr Regis Mary Dunne AO | Ethics and public policy in the genomic era |
| 2002 | John J Hopwood AM | Lysosomal storage disorders: early diagnosis and effective therapy |
| 2003 | Robert (Bob) Williamson AO | Ethics, the new genetics and public health |
| 2004 | Jack Goldblatt AM | Do genetics - see the world |
| 2005 | Michael Partington | Forays in syndromology over 50 years |
| 2006 | Not held | 11th International Congress of Human Genetics |
| 2007 | Mac Gardner | Some reflections on the philosophy and practice of medical genetics |
| 2008 | John C Mulley | Forty years from markers to genes |
| 2009 | Ian Walpole | Clinical genetic services: base to horizons |
| 2010 | Jane Halliday | A trip down memory lane: progress in prenatal testing |
| 2011 | John H Pearn AO | Courage in discovery |
| 2012 | David O Sillence AM | Teaching and learning in genetic medicine |
| 2013 | Joanne W Dixon, ONZM | Genetics in clinical practice: integrating new discoveries into patient care over three decades |
| 2014 | Eric A Haan AO | Genetics - it's personal |
| 2015 | Alan Bittles AM | Why community genetics? |
| 2016 | Agnes Bankier OAM | Links and second chances... |
| 2017 | James (Jim) McGill AM | A fortuitous metabolic pathway |
| 2018 | Kristine Barlow-Stewart AM | I wanted to be a genetic counsellor ….. and this is my story |
| 2019 | Mary-Anne Young | Systems and change |
| 2020 | Not held | Not held due to the global COVID-19 pandemic |
| 2021 | Janice Fletcher | Phenotype, proteins, and pathology |
| 2022 | Nigel Laing AO | Tales of a grandfather (molecular genetics) |
