= List of presidents of the Human Genetics Society of Australasia =

List of presidents of the HGSA

This list of presidents of the Human Genetics Society of Australasia (HGSA) includes all presidents since the society's creation in 1977.

== Presidents ==
Term	Name	Comments
1977-1979	Anthony C Pollard AM	
1979-1981	David M Danks AO	
1981-1983	Charles Kerr AM	
1983-1985	John H Pearn AO	
1985-1987	Robert L Kirk	
1987-1989	Cyril Chapman	
1989-1991	Grant R Sutherland AC	
1991-1993	O Margaret Garson AO	
1993-1995	Robert Robertson	
1995-1997	Jack Goldblatt AM	
1997-1999	Bridget Wilcken AM	
1999-2001	Agnes Bankier OAM	
2001-2003	Eric A Haan AO	
2003-2005	Cynthia Roberts	
2005-2007	John Christodoulou AM	
2007-2009	David Thorburn	
2009 –2011	Julie McGaughran	
2011 –2013	Kevin Carpenter	
2013 –2015	Joanne W Dixon ONZM	
2015–2017	Mary-Anne Young	
2017–2019	Michael Buckley	
2019–2021	Vanessa Tyrrell	
2021-2023	Alison McEwen	
2023-2025	Yemima Berman	
