= Michael T. Gabbett =

Australian clinical geneticist and academic (born 1974)

Michael Terrence Gabbett MBBS MMedSc MHM FRACP
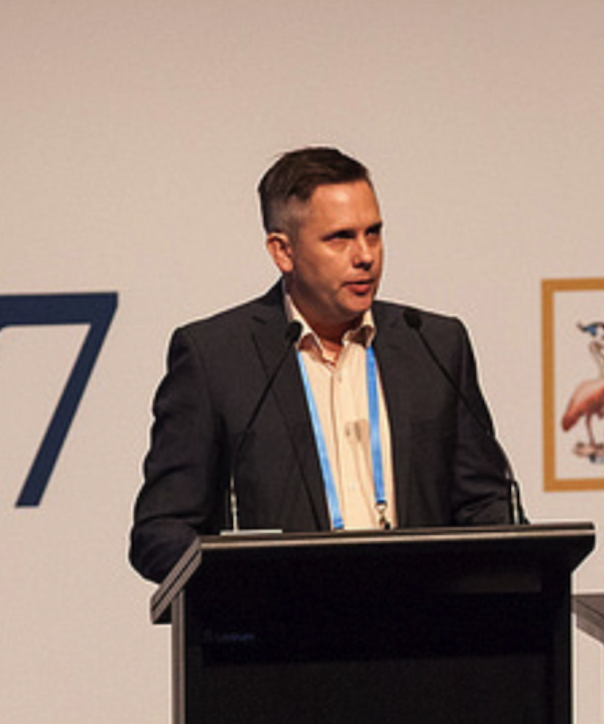
- Michael Gabbett chairing 2017 RACP Congress in Melbourne
- Born: 1974 (age 51–52)
- Education: University of Queensland (MBBS 1997); University of Newcastle (MMedSc 2006); University of New South Wales (MHM 2018)
- Known for: Temple–Baraitser syndrome Semi-identical twins
- Scientific career
- Fields: Clinical genetics, paediatrics, medical education
- Workplaces: Queensland University of Technology

Michael Terrence Gabbett (born 1974) is an Australian clinical geneticist and academic. He holds academic titles at a number of universities in South East Queensland. Gabbett is known for contributing to discovering the genetic basis of semi-identical (sesquizygotic) twins and defining the clinical features and molecular cause of Temple–Baraitser syndrome.

== Early life ==
Gabbett attended high school at Marist College Ashgrove, where he was awarded the Australian Student Prize and was accepted into the University of Queensland to study medicine.

== Service to science ==
Gabbett was joint first author on the paper that demonstrated biallelic mutations in the mismatch repair genes are associated with malfomations of the brain. Gabbett and colleagues helped define the oculoauriculofrontonasal syndrome. In 2015, Gabbett and his molecular genetic colleagues demonstrated the cause of Temple Baraitser syndrome, a condition that Gabbett clinically defined seven years earlier. Gabbett and Nick Fisk were able to postulate, with supportive molecular evidence, how semi-identical (sesquizygotic) twinning is the result of a single egg being fertilized by two sperm from the same man.

== Service to professional organisations ==
Gabbett has contributed to authorship of the Australasian clinical genetics training curriculum, and led the 2022 working party that made recommendations to medical schools on their genomics curriculum. For three years (2015-2018), he was chair of the scientific programme and the local organising committees (Lead Fellow) for RACP Congress, the annual scientific meeting of the Royal Australasian College of Physicians. Gabbett has served as president of the Australasian Association of Clinical Geneticists (2017-2019). From 2018 to 2022, Gabbett sat on Council of the Human Genetics Society of Australasia as Treasurer.

== Awards and recognition ==
Year	Body	Award	Reason
2025	Human Genetics Society of Australasia	Education, Ethics and Social Issues Service Excellence Award	For outstanding service to the Education, Ethics and Social Issues Committee of the Human Genetics Society of Australasia
2023	Human Genetics Society of Australasia	Service Excellence Award	For outstanding service to the Human Genetics Society of Australasia and for significant contribution to the field of human genetics
2021	Queensland University of Technology, Centre for Genomics & Personalised Health	Education & Outreach Award	For demonstrating exceptional leadership as Course Co-ordinator for QUT's Master of Diagnostic Genomics Course and for contributing to the delivery of high quality and impactful professional development courses across Australia.
