= Marilla North =

Australian poet, educator, administrator and biographer

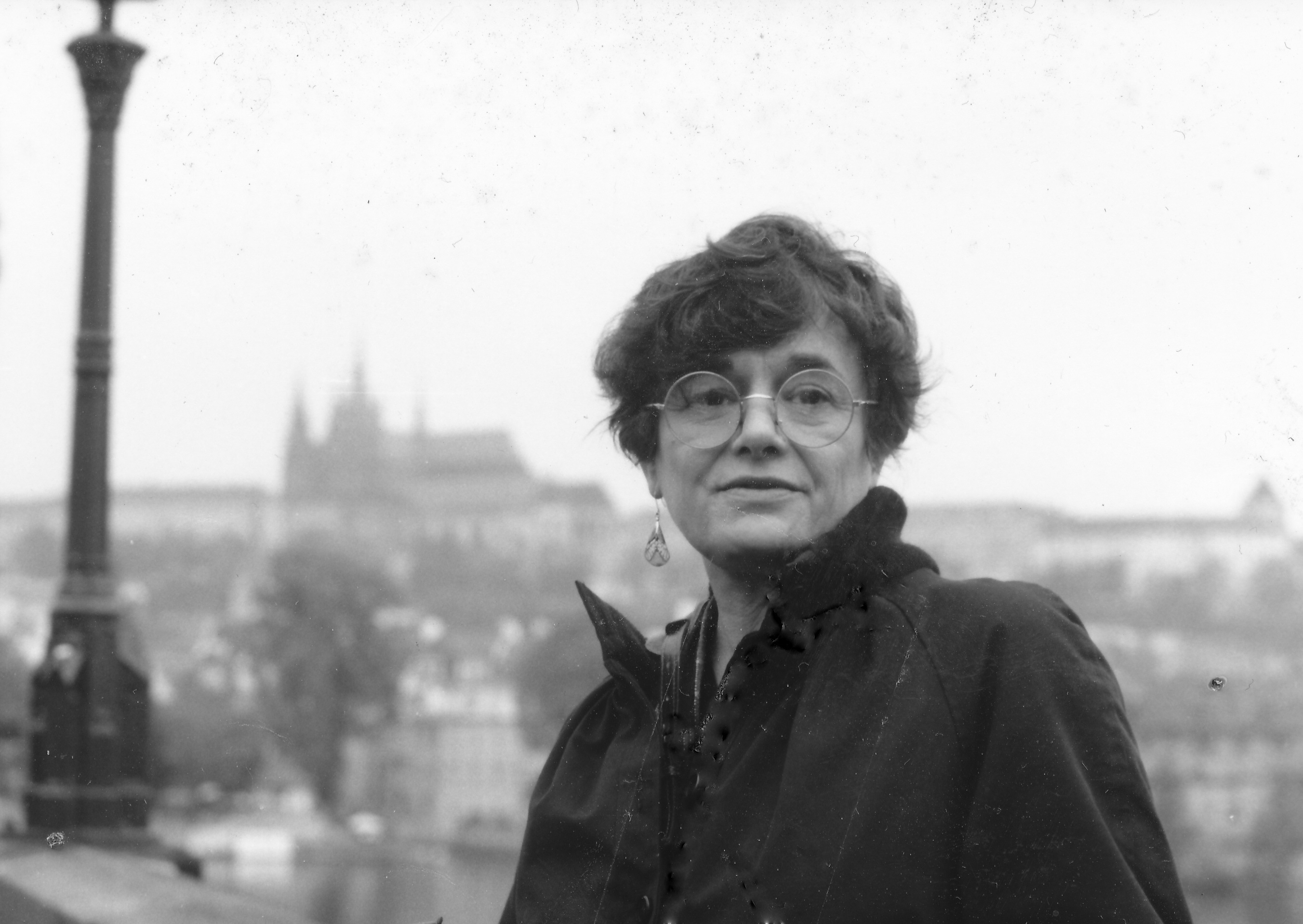
- Marilla North, Prague 1995
- Born: Marilla North; 1945 (age 80–81); Newcastle, New South Wales, Australia
- Children: 1
- Awards: 2001 Fellowship of Australian Writers Christina Stead Award for Biography – winner
- Website: http://www.yarnspinners.com.au/

Marilla North (also Marilla Wilson and Marilla Eidlitz) is a biographer and cultural historian, working in Australian women's literary history.

She is the sister of geneticist Professor Kathryn North.

== Career ==
North's book of poetry Blue Glass and Turtle Eggs was published in 1975.

With Ferencz Eidlitz, she exhibited an experimental design of her poetry in Canberra Theatre.

North organised music events for the Richmond Grove Winery in the Hunter Valley.

From 2000, North taught Australian literature at Boston University's Sydney Programme. In 2014 she was awarded a Postgraduate Scholarship at the University of Queensland.

In 2001, she published Yarn Spinners, an experimental biographical text of friendship, politics and literature woven through the letters between Cusack and two other contemporary writers Miles Franklin and Florence James. She later created Yarnspinners Press Collective with her husband. In 2017, she published a significantly revised and expanded second edition of Yarn Spinners.

== Publications ==
=== Books ===
- 1975: Blue Glass and Turtles Eggs, Jacaranda Press
- 2001: Yarn Spinners: A Story in Letters University of Queensland Press
- 2016: Yarn Spinners: A Story of Friendship, Politics and a Shared Commitment to a Distinctive Australian Literature, Woven Through the Letter of Dymphna Cusack, Florence James, Miles Franklin, and Their Congenials, Revised and expanded second edition, Brandle and Schlesinger, Sydney
- 2017: Come in Dymphna : The Life and Loves of Dymphna Cusack, Brandl and Schlesinger
- 2019: Singing Back the River, Yarnspinners Press Collective
- 2024: Remembering Dorothy co-written with Joe Flood, Deluge Publishing

=== Editor ===
- 2005: Co-editor with Prof Elizabeth Webby, "Australian and International Feminisms 1975–2005: Where We've Been and Where We're Going" Special Edition of Social Alternatives 24 (2)
- 2015: “Dymphna Cusack and the Hunter” in Bennett, J (ed) Radical Newcastle (New South Press) pp 144–151.

== Awards ==
- 2001 Fellowship of Australian Writers Christina Stead Award for Biography – winner for Yarn Spinners: A Story in Letters
