= David Sillence =

Australian geneticist

David Owen Sillence AM FRACP
- Born: 1944 (age 81–82)
- Education: University of Sydney; University of Melbourne
- Known for: Classification of osteogenesis imperfecta Founding clinical genetics in the Asia-Pacific
- Scientific career
- Fields: Medical Genetics
- Workplaces: University of Sydney; The Children's Hospital at Westmead
- Website: www.sydney.edu.au/medicine-health/about/our-people/academic-staff/david-sillence.html

David Owen Sillence AM (born 1944) is an academic and medical geneticist. He is an emeritus professor at the University of Sydney, where he was the foundation chair (Professor) of Medical Genetics.

== Early life and education ==
Sillence was born and raised in Australia. He received his bachelor of medicine from the University of Sydney in 1970 and an MD in medical genetics from the University of Melbourne in 1978.

== Career ==
In 1984, Sillence became the Foundation Head of the Department of Clinical Genetics at the Royal Alexandra Hospital.

He was the Foundation Professor of Medical Genetics at the University of Sydney in 1988 and the Foundation Head, Discipline of Genetic Medicine in 2005.

He was part of the committee that pioneered the measurement of bone density in children in Australia and the team that pioneered the systematic treatment of osteoporosis in Osteogenesis Imperfects in children in Australia. Sillence is also responsible for the discovery and delineation of many new skeletal disorders in children.

Sillence was a founding member of the Human Genetics Society of Australasia (1978), the Australian Teratology Society (1981), the Australian Faculty of Public Health Medicine (1990), and the American College of Medical Genetics (1993) and has held office in the Human Genetics Society of Australasia from 1981 to 2000, often with more than one concurrent position. He has also held office in the Royal Australasian College of Physicians from 1994 to 2000. He is a spokesperson for the International Nomenclature Committee for Constitutional Disorders of the Skeleton. He is part of the International mucopolysaccharidosis type I expert committee, the National Fabry Disease, and MPS expert committees for the LSDP.

Sillence was instrumental in establishing the first working party to write guidelines for training in Clinical Genetics in Australia and was granted Clinical Geneticist status (1987) through the grandfather clause. This certification model has been used by other Special Interest Groups within the Human Genetics Society of Australasia. He has been involved in a considerable amount of collaborative research as well as those within his department. He has published over 130 original articles, has contributed over 30 book chapters, 8 books/monographs, and has contributed to conference proceedings more than a dozen times. He has been a peer reviewer/editor to 8 different groups/journals.

Sillence created the standard four-type system of osteogenesis imperfecta in 1979. It enabled progress into the molecular causes of the disorder and collagen mutations.

In 2012, Sillence delivered the Human Genetics Society of Australasia Oration, a prestigious lecture in his field.

Sillence was appointed a Member of the Order of Australia (AM) in the 2013 Australia Day Honours.
