= AACG =

AACG may refer to:

- Acute angle closure glaucoma
- Australasian Association of Clinical Geneticists
