= Nicholas Fisk =

Nicolas Fisk may refer to:

- Nick Fisk, or Nicolas M. Fisk, Australian maternal-fetal medicine specialist, academic and higher education lead
- Nicholas Fisk (author), British writer of science fiction books mainly for children
