= Sillence =

Sillence is a surname. Notable people with the surname include:

- David Sillence (born 1944), Australian geneticist
- Roger Sillence (born 1977), English cricketer
