= Muin J. Khoury =

American geneticist and epidemiologist

Muin Joseph Khoury is an American geneticist and epidemiologist who conducts research in the field of public health genomics. He is the founding director of the Office of Public Health Genomics at the Centers for Disease Control and Prevention since 1997. He has also been a senior advisor in public health genomics at the National Cancer Institute since 2007.

== Biography ==
Khoury received his B.S. degree in Biology/Chemistry from the American University of Beirut in Lebanon. He received a Ph.D. in Human Genetics/Genetic Epidemiology and training in Medical Genetics from Johns Hopkins University. Khoury is board certified in Medical Genetics.

Khoury has developed various successful ongoing national and international initiatives to turn advances in genomics and precision health technologies into actions that improve health and prevent disease.

He has over 500 scientific publications and has authored several textbooks on genetic epidemiology. He is an adjunct professor in the Departments of Epidemiology and Environmental and Occupational Health at Emory University Rollins School of Public Health and an associate in the Department of Epidemiology at Johns Hopkins Bloomberg School of Public Health.

== Bibliography ==
- Fundamentals of Genetic Epidemiology (1993)
- Genetics and Public Health in the 21st Century (2000)
- Human Genome Epidemiology Vol. I (2004)
- Human Genome Epidemiology Vol. II (2010)

== Awards ==
- Public Health Service Special Recognition Award in 1990 for his contributions in the areas of birth defects and genetic epidemiology
- Arthur S. Flemming Award In 1994 for outstanding government service
- Senior Biomedical Research Service award in 1998 for outstanding contributions to public health
- CDC Research Honor Award in 2000 for outstanding national leadership in genetics and public health
