= GRaPH-Int =

GRaPH-Int Logo

The Genome-based Research and Population Health International Network (GRaPH-Int) is an international collaboration of experts and researchers focused in the area of population health. The principal goal of the network is to promote the translation of genome-based science and technology into improvements in population health.

One of GRaPH-Int's key features is the integration of knowledge from a range of disciplines, such as genome-based science, population sciences, the humanities and social sciences. The ‘Int’ underscores the interdisciplinarity of the collaboration, but also signifies that it is international and integrated.

== Mission ==
The mission of the Genome-based Research and Population Health International Network (GRaPH-Int) is to promote an international collaboration that facilitates the responsible and effective integration of genome-based knowledge and technologies into public policies, programmes, and services for improving population health.

== History ==
=== Bellagio Initiative ===
Modern research in genetics and molecular biology, boosted by information emerging from the Human Genome Project, offers new opportunities for the promotion of population health. Anticipated benefits include more effective population-based public health disease prevention and control activities; population screening and predictive genetic testing for common multi-factorial diseases; and targeted populations-based interventions.

However, mining the genome-based information for potential benefits and ensuring that they are effectively implemented, with appropriate attention to avoiding harm, has proven to be an enormous task. A new field within public health, called public health genomics has evolved which addresses these issues.

A meeting of experts was convened in Bellagio Italy in 2005 with funding from the Rockefeller Foundation to address the tasks involved in deriving public health benefit from this vast array of new knowledge. The delegates saw the need for an international network, which would promote the goals of public health genomics. Based on discussions of the challenges involved, they developed the framework and priorities of the Genome-based Research and Population Health International Network (GRaPH-Int). The Bellagio group defined GRaPH-Int as a network of individuals who are interested in the impact of the interaction between genes and the environment on population health

Following the Bellagio meeting, The GRaPH-Int website was launched at the 4th International DNA Sampling Conference - Montreal, June 2006.

== Goals ==
GRaPH-Int aims to establish itself as an international network that promotes the goals of public health, engages international experts, and shares knowledge and resources. The following six goals have identified for the network:

- To provide an international forum for dialogue and collaboration
- To promote relevant research
- To support the development of an integrated knowledge base
- To promote education and training
- To encourage communication and engagement with the public and other stakeholders

== Enterprise ==
The GRaPH-Int Enterprise was developed and introduced at the Bellagio workshop as a conceptual and systematic description of the flow of information. It describes the process of translating genome-based science and technology into improvements in population health.

== Bioportal ==
The recent overload of information on public health genome-based science necessitates the creation of an international search engine to link policymakers, researchers and public health professionals to national policy statements, epidemiological data, public health, news and events. GRaPH-Int has undertaken the task of developing this service, and the first phase of development began in 2007.

This search engine, referred to as the Bioportal, will optimize searches on:

- the ethical, legal and social issues surrounding public health genome-based science;
- public health genome-based literature;
- epidemiological data; and
- public health genome-based news and events.

== Governance ==
GRaPH-Int and its activity are overseen by an administrative hub, secretariat, executive committee and a steering committee.

=== The administrative hub ===
The GRaPH-Int Administrative Hub is located in Canada and is funded by the Public Health Agency of Canada (PHAC). A major component of the Administrative Hub is the secretariat (managed by the Centre de recherche en droit public), whose services better enable PHAC, as the designated administrative hub for the network.

=== Executive committee ===
The purpose of the GRaPH-Int Executive Committee is to provide leadership in fulfilling the mission and goals of GRaPH-Int. The founding Executive Committee members are Ron Zimmern, Public Health Genetics Unit (PHGU) now the PHG Foundation, Cambridge, UK, Wylie Burke, Institute for Public Health Genetics (IPHG) and Department of Medical History and Ethics, University of Washington, Seattle, U.S.A., Muin Khoury, National Office of Public Health Genomics (NOPHG), Centers for Disease Control and Prevention, Atlanta, U.S.A., Mohamed Karmali, Laboratory for Foodborne Zoonoses, and Office of Biotechnology, Genomics & Population Health, Public Health Agency of Canada, and Professor Julian Little, Canada Research Chair in Human Genome Epidemiology, University of Ottawa.

=== Steering committee ===
The purpose of the GRaPH-Int Steering Committee is to support the GRaPH-Int Executive Committee in their mission. The steering committee is composed of network participants in a mixture that will adequately represent the different institutional, scientific disciplines and perspectives necessary to address the mission and goals of GRaPH-Int. The Founder Chairman of the steering committee is Ron Zimmern.

The steering committee elects the following officers: chairperson, vice-chairperson, and secretary. The chairperson, vice-chairperson, the past-chairperson, secretary, and the executive director constitute the executive committee. The founding executive committee members include:

- Ron Zimmern, GRaPH-Int Interim Chair

Executive director, PHG Foundation, Cambridge, UK

- Mohamed A. Karmali, GRaPH-Int executive director

Director-general, Laboratory for Foodborne Zoonoses, Office of Biotechnology, Genomics & Population Health Public Health Agency of Canada, Ontario, Canada

- Wylie Burke, Institute for Public Health Genetics (IPHG),

Department of Medical History and Ethics University of Washington, Seattle, USA

- Muin Khoury, director, National Office of Public Health Genomics, Centers for Disease Control, Atlanta, US
- Julian Little, Canada Research Chair, University of Ottawa, Ottawa, Canada

=== Founding organizations ===
The following entities are recognized as GraPH-Int founding organizations:

- HumGen
- Institute for Public Health Genetics, University of Washington
- National Office of Public Health Genomics, Centres for Disease Control
- PHG Foundation
- Public Health Agency of Canada

=== Membership ===
Organizational participation in GRaPH-Int is open to new members throughout the world that have an interest in the development and use of genome-based knowledge and technologies for the benefit of population health.
