= Risk factors for tuberculosis =

There are a number risk factors for tuberculosis infection; worldwide the most important of these is HIV. Co-infection with HIV is a particular problem in Sub-Saharan Africa, due to the high incidence of HIV in these countries. Smoking more than 20 cigarettes a day increases the risk of TB by two to four times while silicosis increases the risk about 30 fold. Diabetes mellitus is also an important risk factor that is growing in importance in developing countries. Other disease states that increase the risk of developing tuberculosis are Hodgkin lymphoma, end-stage renal disease, chronic lung disease, malnutrition, and alcoholism. A person's genetics also play a role.

== Silicosis ==
People with silicosis have an approximately 30-fold greater risk for developing TB. Silica particles irritate the respiratory system, causing immunogenic responses such as phagocytosis, which results in high lymphatic vessel deposits. It is probably this interference and blockage of macrophage function that increases the risk of tuberculosis. Persons with chronic kidney failure and also on hemodialysis have an increased risk. Given that silicosis greatly increases the risk of tuberculosis, more research about the effect of various indoor or outdoor air pollutants on the disease would be necessary. Some possible indoor sources of silica include paint, concrete, and Portland cement. Crystalline silica is found in concrete, masonry, sandstone, rock, paint, and other abrasives. The cutting, breaking, crushing, drilling, grinding, or abrasive blasting of these materials may produce fine silica dust. It can also be in soil, mortar, plaster, and shingles.

Some drugs, including rheumatoid arthritis drugs that work by blocking tumor necrosis factor-alpha (an inflammation-causingcytokine), raise the risk of activating a latent infection due to the importance of this cytokine in the immune defense against TB.

== HIV ==
TB related deaths among those with HIV

HIV is a major risk factor for tuberculosis. The risk of developing TB is estimated to be between 20 and 37 times greater in people living with HIV than among those without HIV infection. TB is a leading cause of morbidity and mortality among people living with HIV. In 2009, there were 9.4 million new cases of TB, of which 1.2 (13%) million were among people living with HIV. Of the 1.7 million people who died of TB, 400,000 (24%) were living with HIV.

== Nutrition ==
Low body weight is associated with risk of tuberculosis. A body mass index (BMI) below 18.5 increases the risk by 2 to 3 times. An increase in body weight lowers the risk. People with diabetes mellitus are at increased risk of contracting tuberculosis, and they have a poorer response to treatment, possibly due to poorer drug absorption.

Other clinical conditions that have been associated with active TB include gastrectomy with attendant weight loss and malabsorption, jejunoileal bypass, renal and cardiac transplantation, carcinoma of the head or neck, and other neoplasms (e.g., lung cancer, lymphoma, and leukemia).

Diet may also modulate risk. For example, among immigrants in London from the Indian subcontinent, vegetarian Hindu Asians were found to have an 8.5 fold increased risk of tuberculosis, compared to Muslims who ate meat and fish daily. Although a causal link is not proved by this data, this increased risk could be caused by micronutrient deficiencies: possibly iron, vitamin B12 or vitamin D. Further studies have provided more evidence of a link between vitamin D deficiency and an increased risk of contracting tuberculosis. Globally, the severe malnutrition common in parts of the developing world causes a large increase in the risk of developing active tuberculosis, due to its damaging effects on the immune system. Along with overcrowding, poor nutrition may contribute to the strong link observed between tuberculosis and poverty.

== Crowding ==
Prisoners are particularly vulnerable to infectious diseases such as HIV/AIDS and TB. Imprisonment facilities provide conditions that allow TB to spread rapidly due to overcrowding, poor nutrition, and a lack of health services. TB outbreaks have been reported in prisons and jails throughout the world, and is particularly concerning in the United States, which incarcerates a larger proportion of its population than any other nation. The prevalence of TB in prisons is much higher than among the general population—in some countries as much as 40 times higher.

== Diabetes ==
There is a 3 fold increased risk of infection with TB for people who have diabetes mellitus. Higher associations have been found between diabetes mellitus and TB in study populations from Central America, Europe, and Asia. Developing countries with exponential economic growth such as India and China that account for 40% of incident TB cases in 2010 and are estimated to have a 69% increase in people with diabetes mellitus are of concern for the joint burden of disease between diabetes mellitus and tuberculosis.

== Other ==
Other conditions that increase risk include the sharing of needles among IV drug users, recent TB infection or a history of inadequately treated TB, chest X-ray suggestive of previous TB, showing fibrotic lesions and nodules, prolonged corticosteroid therapy and other immunosuppressive therapy, compromised immune system (30–40% of people with AIDS worldwide also have TB), hematologic and reticuloendothelial diseases, such as leukemia and Hodgkin's disease, end-stage kidney disease, intestinal bypass, chronic malabsorption syndromes, vitamin D deficiency, and low body weight. There is also genetic susceptibility.
