= John Christodoulou (geneticist) =

Australian geneticist

John Christodoulou AM FAHMS
- Education: University of Sydney; University of Melbourne
- Known for: Mitochondrial disease, Rett syndrome
- Awards: Member of the Order of Australia (2010); Fellow of the Australian Academy of Health and Medical Sciences (2017)
- Scientific career
- Fields: Medical Genetics
- Workplaces: Murdoch Children's Research Institute, University of Melbourne
- Website: www.mcri.edu.au/users/john-christodoulou

John Christodoulou is an Australian medical geneticist, genetic pathologist and clinical scientist. He is director of the Genetics Theme and Group Co-Leader of the Brain and Mitochondrial Research Group at Murdoch Children's Research Institute. Additionally, he holds the Chair in Genomic Medicine, Department of Paediatrics, The University of Melbourne.

== Career ==
After studying medicine at the University of Sydney, Christodoulou undertook his medical internship at Westmead Hospital. He subsequently trained in paediatrics at the Royal Alexandra Children's Hospital, before moving to Melbourne to undertake his PhD into birth defects. In 1990, Christodoulou then moved to Toronto to train in metabolic medicine, before moving back to Sydney to take up consultant positions at a number of hospitals across Sydney. In January 2016 he relocated from Sydney, and took up the inaugural Chair of Genomic Medicine at the Murdoch Children's Research Institute and the University of Melbourne.

== Publications ==
=== Journal articles ===
Google Scholar lists over 420 documents by Christodoulou, which have been cited in excess of 17,000 times, and calculates his h-index as 68.

=== Book chapters ===
- Christodoulou, J., Williamson, S., Ellaway, C. (2005). Rett Syndrome. In Jurgen Fuchs & Maurizio Podda (Eds.), Encyclopedia of Medical Genomics and Proteomics, (pp. 1–7). Europe: Marcel Dekker. ISBN 978-0-8247-5564-5
- Christodoulou, J., Wilcken, B. (2004). Biochemical Genetic Emergencies. In Henry Kilham & David Isaacs (Eds.), The Children's Hospital at Westmead Handbook: Clinical practice guidelines for paediatrics, (pp. 104–111). Sydney: McGraw-Hill Education. ISBN 007-4-71161-X
- Christodoulou, J. (2003). Genetic metabolic disorders. In Kenneth P. Nunn, Cybele Dey (Eds.), The Clinicians Guide to Psychotropic Prescribing Children and Adolescents, (pp. 332–346). Australia: Child and Adolescent Mental Health Statewide Network. ISBN 095-7-79514-9
- Christodoulou, J. (2002). A clinical approach to inborn errors of metabolism. In Rudolph AM, Kamei RK, Overby KJ (Eds.), Rudolph's Fundamentals of Pediatrics, (pp. 221–252). United Kingdom: McGraw-Hill Education. ISBN 978-0-838-58450-7
- Christodoulou, J., Barlow, R. (2001). It's all in our genes. In Kim Oates, Kathryn Currow & Wendy Hu (Eds.), Child Health: A Practical Manual for General Practice, (pp. 37–46). Australia: MacLennan & Petty. ISBN 0864-3-3154-1

== Service to professional organisations ==
Professor Christodoulou has served as a leader of medical and research genetics on a National level. Christodoulou is a former President of the Human Genetics Society of Australasia (2005-2007), and member of the Human Genetics Advisory Committee (2009-2015).

== Recognition ==
- National Health and Medical Research Council of Australia Postgraduate Medical Research Fellowship -1987-1990.
- American Society of Human Genetics Postdoctoral Clinical Research Student Award, 1992.
- Vice-Chancellor's Award for Excellence in Postgraduate Research Higher Degree Supervision, 2004.
- Member, Order of Australia (AM), 2010 Australia Day Honours. Awarded in recognition of my contributions to genetic practice and research, particularly in the area of genetic metabolic disorders.
- Ippokratis Award for outstanding achievement by a medical professional. Awarded by the Australasian Hellenic Educational Progressive Association (AHEPA), 2010
- Human Genetics Society of Australasia Sutherland Lecturer, 2010
- Elected as Fellow of the Australian Academy of Health and Medical Sciences, elected 2017
