= Human Mutation =

- Discipline: Human genetics
- Language: English
- Edited by: Garry R. Cutting

Publication details
- History: 1992–present
- Publisher: Wiley-Liss on behalf of the Human Genome Variation Society
- Frequency: Monthly
- Impact factor: 4.878 (2020)

Standard abbreviations
- ISO 4: Hum. Mutat.

Indexing
- CODEN: HUMUE3
- ISSN: 1059-7794 (print); 1098-1004 (web)
- LCCN: 92644035
- OCLC no.: 610376555

Links
- Journal homepage; Online access; Online archive

Human Mutation is a peer-reviewed medical journal of human genetics published by Wiley-Liss on behalf of the Human Genome Variation Society. It first appeared in 1992. The founding editors-in-chief were Haig H. Kazazian and Richard G.H. Cotton. Cotton served until his death in 2015, latterly with Garry R. Cutting, who became sole EIC.

According to the Journal Citation Reports, the journal has a 2020 impact factor of 4.878, ranking it 44th out of 176 journals in the category "Genetics & Heredity".
