= David M. Danks =

Australian paediatrician (1931–2003)

David Miles Danks AO FRACP
- Born: 4 June 1931; Melbourne
- Died: 8 July 2003 (aged 72)
- Education: University of Melbourne
- Occupation: Medical geneticist
- Known for: Founder, Murdoch Children's Research Institute; Menkes disease; Dysmorphology
- Medical career
- Profession: Medicine
- Field: Human genetics
- Institutions: Royal Children's Hospital, Melbourne; Murdoch Children's Research Institute
- Sub-specialties: Dysmorphology

David Miles Danks (4 June 1931 – 8 July 2003) was a paediatrician, medical researcher and is considered the founder of medical genetics in Australia.

Inspired to know 'why a disease had occurred' and 'how it could be anticipated and prevented', Danks trained with pioneers of human genetics in London and Baltimore from 1959. At that time, human genetics was scarcely known in Australia.

He identified the cause of Menkes disease in 1972 and made breakthroughs in PKU testing. Danks was appointed Professor of Paediatrics at the Royal Children's Hospital, Melbourne in 1974.

Professor Danks established the Murdoch Institute for Research into Birth Defects together with Dame Elisabeth Murdoch DBE AC, where he could fully implement his vision of unfettered basic scientific research wedded to clinical practice and services to public health. He applied his entrepreneurial flair to the development of a brilliant multi-disciplinary research team focussed on the identification of genetic diseases affecting newborns and their treatment in the clinic.

In 2000, the Murdoch Institute merged with the medical research institute of the Royal Children's Hospital to become the Murdoch Children's Research Institute.

The University of Melbourne honours Danks through the eponymous David Danks Chair in Child Health Research and an annual oration in his name. Since 2013, the Danks Chair has been held by Professor Kathryn North AC, when she also took over as Director of Murdoch Children's Research Institute.
