= John Danks & Son =

Australian manufacturing company

John Danks & Son was a major manufacturing company in Melbourne, Victoria and Sydney, New South Wales.

== History ==
John Danks (January 1828 – 28 February 1902) was born in Wednesbury, Staffordshire, England. He served an apprenticeship with his father, also named John Danks, a manufacturer of wrought iron tubing, then joined his brothers Samuel and Thomas, who were setting up a similar factory. In 1857, the brothers emigrated to Melbourne in the Shaftesbury, and started manufacturing iron pipes and plumbing fittings; one of their first major contracts was to manufacture connectors for Melbourne's pioneering Yan Yean Reservoir.

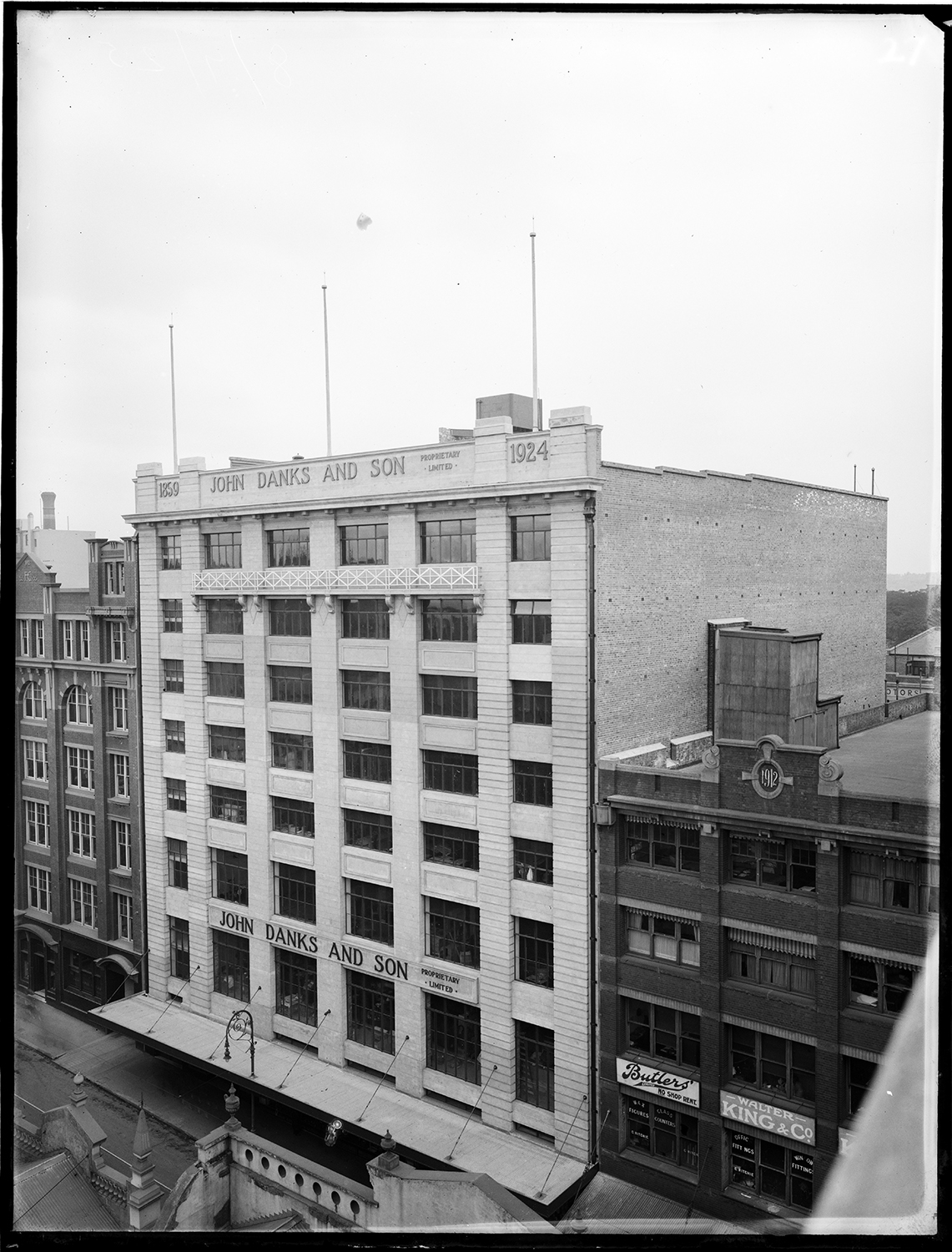
John Danks & Son, 324-330 Pitt Street, Sydney, 1925, by Arthur Ernest Foster

Thomas and Samuel Danks retired from business in 1860 and 1871 respectively; under John's management the company steadily grew; he brought in as a partner his son Aaron Turner Danks, who made a speciality of brass casting, and opened a subsidiary business in Staffordshire. The payroll grew from 35 to 150, aided by import tariffs of from 12½% to 20%. The business was hard hit by the Depression of the 1890s, but they opened a factory in Sydney, and won a major contract associated with expansion of the Melbourne sewerage network; by 1900 the payroll had reached 200. Aaron followed his father as managing director of John Danks & Son in 1902.

They cast and installed the eight bells of St Bartholomew's Church, Burnley 1927–1929.

In the Depression years of the 1930s, the company's manufacturing business shrank, and its fortunes depended on retail trade from its stores at 391 Bourke Street, Melbourne, and elsewhere.

John Danks & Son was floated as a public company in 1950.

In 1970, John Danks Holdings Ltd. became part of an Australia-wide chain of hardware retailers Australian Hardware Distributors Pty. Ltd., which comprised John Danks & Son, Pty. Ltd. of Sydney and Melbourne; Sandovers Ltd. of Western Australia; Colton, Palmer and Preston Ltd. of South Australia, W. Hart & Sons, Launceston, Tasmania; Homecrafts (Tasmania), Hobart, Tasmania; and Brett and Co. Pty. Ltd., Queensland.

Danks was acquired by a joint venture of Woolworths Group and Lowe's in 2009. In 2016, the former Danks operations were sold to Metcash.

== People ==
John Danks (January 1828 – 28 February 1902) was elected to the Emerald Hill Council in 1871 and served until 1880, including two years as mayor 1874-1876. In 1877 he stood, unsuccessfully, for the Emerald Hill seat in the Legislative Assembly. He was, like his Adelaide contemporary Samuel Perry, an active supporter of the Methodist Church and was for many years a Sunday school-teacher. He donated £3000 to the Cecil Street Wesleyan Church, and gave generously to other charitable institutions. He was married to Ann, née Turner (ca.1828 – 2 February 1910); they lived at "Vermont", Merton Crescent, South Melbourne, where he died in 1902 after a short illness.

Sir Aaron Turner Danks (1861 – 5 June 1928) was born in Melbourne and educated at Wesley College and Horton College, Tasmania. In 1887 he married Jane Blaylock Miles ( – 8 October 1931), daughter of the then Town Clerk of Melbourne. They had a daughter Annie, and two sons: John predeceased him by six years; the other, Frederick Miles Danks, succeeded Sir Aaron as managing director. He was involved in many philanthropic organizations: he was a member of the Melbourne Hospital Committee from 1916 and its president from 1920; he was president of the Walter and Eliza Hall Research Institute; he was chairman of the Metropolitan Hospitals Association; he was president of the Child Welfare Association; he was Special Magistrate on the Children's Courts at South Melbourne. He was on the executive of the Protectionist Association of Victoria and an active member of the member of the Victorian Chamber of Manufactures. He was knighted in 1925. They lived at "Hazeldene", 8 Balwyn Road, Canterbury.

Frederick Miles "Fred" Danks, sole remaining son of Sir Aaron, was an expert gardener and plant breeder, noted for his "Gartref" strain of Iceland poppy. He married Dorothy Twiston Williams (died 1974) in 1924. Their family included John Twiston Danks and David Miles Danks; they lived at "Gartref" (Welsh for "home"), 33 Balwyn Road, Canterbury.

John Twiston Danks (born 16 May 1926) was educated at Camberwell Grammar School and Wesley College. He married Norma Mary Butt in 1948. He joined John Danks and Son in 1948 and was a director of Danks Holdings from 1952 and General Manager from 1959.

David Miles Danks (4 June 1931 – 8 July 2003), born with an undiagnosed hole in the heart condition, he was a noted researcher into human genetics. He identified the cause of Menkes' disease in 1972 and was appointed Professor of Paediatrics at the Royal Children's Hospital, Melbourne, in 1974. The David Danks Professorship of Child Health Research at the University of Melbourne was named for him.
