= Murdoch Children's Research Institute =

Australian paediatric research institute

- Established: 1 December 1986; 39 years ago
- Mission: Applied medical research
- Focus: Paediatrics
- Chair: Patrick Houlihan
- Director: Kathryn North AC
- Staff: 1,800 (2025)
- Budget: A$295.1 million (2025)
- Subsidiaries: Victorian Clinical Genetics Services (VCGS)
- Formerly called: Birth Defects Research Institute; Murdoch Institute for Research into Birth Defects
- Location: 50 Flemington Road, Parkville, Melbourne, Victoria, Australia
- Coordinates: 37°47′37″S 144°56′58″E
- Interactive map of Murdoch Children's Research Institute
- Website: www.mcri.edu.au

The Murdoch Children's Research Institute (MCRI) is an Australian paediatric medical research institute located in Melbourne, Victoria. It is affiliated with the Royal Children's Hospital and the University of Melbourne. The institute has five research themes: Stem Cell Medicine (Theme Director: Enzo Porello), Clinical Sciences (Theme Director: Vicki Anderson), Genomic Medicine (Theme Director: John Christodoulou, Infection, Immunity, and Global Health (Theme Director: Andrew Steer), and Population Health (Theme Director: Sharon Goldfeld AM).

== History ==
The institute was established in 1986 by Professor David Danks and Professor Richard Cotton after media magnate Rupert Murdoch and his family donated A$5 million to the Birth Defects Research Institute at the Royal Children's Hospital in Melbourne in 1984. The institute was later renamed the Murdoch Institute for Research into Birth Defects, and Rupert's mother, Dame Elisabeth Murdoch became its patron.

In 2000, the Murdoch Institute merged with the medical research institute of the Royal Children's Hospital to become the Murdoch Children's Research Institute.

== See also ==
- Health in Australia
