= Medical genetic ethics =

Medical genetic ethics is a field in which the ethics of medical genetics is evaluated. Like other fields of medicine, medical genetics also faces ethical issues.

The availability of direct to consumer (DTC) genetic testing to analyses the genetic variants which predispose the individuals to medical conditions like breast cancer and ovarian cancer demands the review of the guidelines which are based on the ethical issues associated with the clinical setup.

Ethics principles, which are based on the physician-patient relationship, like respect for the autonomy of persons, beneficence, non-maleficence, and justice applied in medical field cover most of the ethical issues in medical genetics. However, due to the fact that the genetic information is shared by the family members and the information which is generated for a patient could involve those who are predisposed to the genetic condition, medical genetic ethics require additional measures.

== ELSI program ==
The Ethical, Legal, and Social Implications of Human Genetics Research (ELSI) program was developed in 1990 and funded by the agencies which funded the human genome project to look into the ethical, legal and social implications which will arise after the completion of human genome project and large scale availability of the genetic information. ELSI program focussed on the high priority areas, like privacy and fairness in the use and interpretation of genomic information, and clinical integration of genetic technologies, which are relevant to medical genetic ethics.

== ELSI of Next Generation Sequencing ==
Next-generation sequencing (NGS) is a massively parallel sequencing technology that offers ultra-high throughput, scalability, and speed. Unlike earlier sequencing technology, some of these NGS techniques are easily accessible to the public and can be used without much training and infrastructure. For example, Nanopore sequencing Technology currently provides the ability to do rapid DNA sequencing with a handheld device. Hence, Its also important to study the Ethical, Legal and Societal aspects of Nanopore-based sequencing technologies and in general Next Generation sequencing.

== WHO guideline ==
In 1995, the World Health Organization published the first guideline on ethical issues in medical genetics. During the time of the guideline, the genetic analysis was confined to the clinical setup and mostly to the developed nations but with the completion of human genome project in 2003 and the advent of high throughput sequencing techniques, the human genome has become accessible to both developed and developing nations and the regular household.
