= List of Annual Scientific Meetings of the Human Genetics Society of Australasia =

Number	Year	Venue	Theme	Notes
1st	1977	Melbourne, Vic		Inaugural Meeting
2nd	1978	Sydney, NSW		
3rd	1979	Queenstown, NZ		
4th	1980	Brisbane, Qld		
5th	1981	Canberra, ACT		
6th	1982	Adelaide, SA		
7th	1983	Perth, WA		
8th	1984	Lorne, Vic	Molecular Genetics	
9th	1985	Sydney, NSW	Genes, Environment and Mankind	
10th	1986	Canberra, ACT		
11th	1987	Rotorua, NZ		
12th	1988	Brisbane, Qld		
13th	1989	Alice Springs, NT		
14th	1990	Fremantle, WA		
15th	1991	Melbourne, Vic		
16th	1992	Newcastle, NSW		
17th	1993	Canberra, ACT		
18th	1994	Auckland, NZ		
19th	1995	Brisbane, Qld	Genes and Development	
20th	1996	Adelaide, SA		
21st	1997	Fremantle, ACT	Human Genetics: Diversity and Disease	
22nd	1998	Melbourne, Vic		
23rd	1999	Sydney, NSW	Genetics into the New Millennium	
24th	2000	Wellington, NZ	Just Genes	
25th	2001	Cairns, Qld		
26th	2002	Adelaide, SA		
27th	2003	Melbourne, Vic		
28th	2004	Fremantle, WA	Genes West	
29th	2005	Newcastle, NSW	Genetics in the Hunter	
30th	2006	Brisbane, Qld	11th International Congress of Human Genetics	Held in conjunction with 11th International Congress of Human Genetics
31st	2007	Auckland, NZ	Genetics for Hearts and Minds	
32nd	2008	Adelaide, SA	Genetics and Adelaide: a Brilliant Blend	
33rd	2009	Fremantle, WA	Genes for Health	Held in conjunction with the inaugural GRaPH-Int Conference
34th	2010	Melbourne, Vic	5th Australian Health & Medical Research Congress	Held in conjunction with 5th Australian Health & Medical Research Congress
35th	2011	Gold Coast, Qld	Genetics in the Sun	
36th	2012	Canberra, ACT	ACTion 2012	
37th	2013	Queenstown, NZ	Genetics of the Senses	
38th	2014	Adelaide, SA	The Changing Face of Genetic Medicine	
39th	2015	Perth, WA	Rare Diseases and Indigenous Genetics	
40th	2016	Hobart, Tas	Integrating Genomics into Healthcare	
41st	2017	Brisbane, Qld	Next Generation: Coming of Age	
42nd	2018	Sydney, NSW	Building Bridges	
43rd	2019	Wellington, NZ	Winds of Change	
Postponed	2020	Virtual meeting	From Promise to Precision: a 2020 Vision	Small virtual meeting held in lieu because of the global COVID-19 pandemic
44th	2021	Adelaide, SA	From Promise to Precision: Beyond a 2020 Vision	Conference held in hybrid format (face-to-face and virtual) because of the global COVID-19 pandemic
45th	2022	Perth, WA	Life Languages: Ancient Stories, New Conversations	
