= GMS =

GMS may refer to:

== Education ==
- Gates Millennium Scholars Program, higher education scholarship program in the United States
- Glen Mills Schools, in Thornbury Township, Delaware County, Pennsylvania, United States
- Governor Morehead School, in Raleigh, North Carolina, United States
- Great Marlow School, in Buckinghamshire, England
- Greenbriar Middle School, in Parma, Ohio, United States
- Noel Grisham Middle School, in the Anderson Mill community, Texas, United States

== Medicine ==
- General medical services, the contract under which NHS general practitioners work
- GMS syndrome, a genetic disorder

== Science and technology ==
- GMS (software), groundwater simulation software
- Geographic Messaging Service, a location-based mobile messaging service
- Geostationary Meteorological Satellite, a series of Japanese weather satellites
- Globalization management system, a type of software for automating human language translation
- Glycerol monostearate, a type of emulsifier
- Google Mobile Services, proprietary apps and services from Google bundled with Android devices
- Grocott's methenamine silver stain, histological stain used to identify fungi by staining of the cell walls
- Galvanized mild steel, a kind of prepainted metal
- GameMaker Studio, a game engine

== Other uses ==
- Gereja Mawar Sharon, a group of Christian Pentecostal churches in Indonesia
  - Gereja Misi Sejahtera, a part from Gereja Mawar Sharon
- GMS (duo), a Dutch psychedelic trance duo
- Global MapleStory, a multiplayer online role-playing game
- Good Morning Scotland, a Scottish breakfast radio news programme
- Greater Mekong Subregion, encompassing the Mekong River basin
- GMS Motorcycles, an English motorcycle designer
- GMS Racing, an American professional stock car racing team
- Gross Merchandise Sales, another name for Gross Merchandise Volume

== See also ==
- GM (disambiguation)
