= HumGen =

Canadian research centre

The Centre of Genomics and Policy (previously the HumGen team) is affiliated with McGill University and McGill University and Génome Québec Innovation Centre Canada. The Centre was launched to respond to the urgent need for informed public policy and analyses on socio-ethical issues related to human genetics research at the international, national, and provincial levels. Its website provides policy makers and the public access to policy statements concerning genetic research.

== History ==
=== The Centre for Genomics and Policy ===
Located within the McGill Genome Centre, the Centre of Genomics and Policy (CGP) works at the crossroads of law, medicine, and public policy. Applying a multidisciplinary perspective and collaborating with national and international partners, the CGP analyzes the socio-ethical and legal norms influencing the promotion, prevention and protection of human health.

Currently, the CGP's research covers several areas of genomics and policy that include: stem cell research and therapies, personalized medicine, prevention and treatment of cancer, data sharing in research, pediatrics, genetic counselling, digital health and AI, intellectual property and open science, epigenetics, intersex and diversity in health, gene editing, genetic discrimination and biobanking (population genetics).

These domains are approached using three guiding foundations: internationalization, policy development and knowledge transfer. First, the CGP promotes internationalization by undertaking comparative analyses of policies and guidelines around the world. Secondly, the CGP actively participates in the creation of international consortia with a view to promoting multidisciplinary policymaking. Finally, via its numerous workshops and lecture series, the CGP encourages knowledge transfer.

The CGP team was formerly affiliated with the Centre de recherche en droit public (CRDP) of the Université de Montréal under the name Genetics and Society Project.

=== HumGen.org ===
Advances in human genetics research have raised complex ethical, legal, and social issues for policymakers. The HumGen.org website provides policymakers and the public with access to legislation, policies, guidelines, and recommendations issued by governmental and nongovernmental organizations worldwide.

The website has been regarded as a unique source of international genetic policy information and has been cited as an important resource for geneticists who are interested in examining the wider implications of their work.

== The Centre for Genomics and Policy ==
=== GRaPH-Int ===
The Genome-based Research and Population Health International Network (GraPH-INT) is an international community of population health experts. GRaPH-INT promotes the use of genome-based research from the sciences, humanities, and social sciences to improve population health.

The website was launched in June 2006. In 2007, development began on the BioPortal search engine, aimed at optimizing searches on public health genome-based subjects (ethical, legal and social issues, research, literature, epidemiological data, and news and events).
