= Kathryn North =

Australian paediatric physician, neurologist, and clinical geneticist

Kathryn Nance North AC FAHMS is a paediatric physician, neurologist, and clinical geneticist. In 2013, she was appointed Director of the Murdoch Children's Research Institute and was named the David Danks Professor of Child Health Research at the University of Melbourne. In 2012, North was appointed chair of the National Health and Medical Research Council Research Committee. In 2014, she was appointed vice chair of the Global Alliance for Genomics and Health (GA4GH) and co-chair of its Clinical Working Group.

North received a doctorate in neurogenetics in 1994 from University of Sydney and later completed a postdoctoral fellowship in the Genetics Program at Harvard Medical School. North's laboratory research is focused on the molecular and genetic basis of inherited muscle disorders including muscular dystrophies and congenital myopathies, and of elite athletic performance. Her clinical research is focused on cognitive deficits in neurofibromatosis type 1 and intervention strategies for children with learning disabilities and inherited myopathies.

North was appointed a member of the Order of Australia (AM) in 2012 for "service to medicine in the field of neuromuscular and neurogenetics research, paediatrics and child health as a clinician and academic, and to national and international professional associations"(2012). She was promoted to Companion of the Order of Australia (AC) in 2019 for "eminent service to genomic medicine nationally and internationally, to medical research in the fields of genetics, neurology and child health, and as a mentor and role model." She was elected a Fellow of the Australian Academy of Health and Medical Sciences in 2014. In 2017, she was awarded an honorary Doctor of Medical Science from the University of Melbourne. In 2026, she was elected a Fellow of the Academy of Medical Sciences.
