= Richard Cotton (geneticist) =

Australian geneticist (1940–2015)

Richard Cotton AM
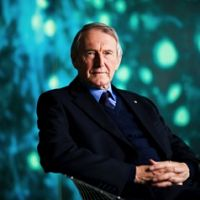
- Professor Richard Cotton
- Born: Richard Graham Hay Cotton; 10 November 1940; Wangaratta, Australia
- Died: 14 June 2015 (aged 74); Melbourne, Australia
- Education: University of Melbourne (DSc, PhD, BAgSc)
- Known for: Human Variome Project; Monoclonal antibody
- Spouse: Elizabeth Cotton (m. 1967)
- Children: Caroline (b. 1974); James (b. 1975); Michael (b. 1979)
- Awards: Order of Australia (2005)
- Scientific career
- Fields: Genetics; Human Mutation
- Workplaces: University of Melbourne; Oxford University; Cambridge University; John Curtin School of Medical Research

Richard Cotton AM (10 November 1940 – 14 June 2015) was an Australian medical researcher and founder of the Murdoch Institute and the Human Variome Project. Cotton focused on the prevention and treatment of genetic disorders and birth defects.

As a genetic researcher, he was instrumental in the development of techniques to produce monoclonal antibodies, and his diagnostic techniques and research into diseases such as Phenylketonuria have been fundamental to the early detection of affected individuals which has often led to life-saving interventions and the prevention of further disease progression. He was a pioneer in the field of Mutation Detection, developing methods for the chemical and enzymatic detection of human genetic mutations. Cotton was one of the first to recognize the need to document the extent of all human genetic variation in order to investigate, treat and prevent human disease. As the Founder and Scientific Director of the Human Variome Project, he has led the world in developing ways to collect, curate, interpret and share information on the genetic changes that underlie both inherited and complex disease. By working with clinicians, diagnostic labs and national governments around the world to make information on genetic variations and their effect on patients freely and openly available, the Human Variome Project enables universal access to knowledge that can be used to prevent, diagnose and treat all human disease.

== Early life ==
Cotton was raised at Kelwhr, a farm at South Wangaratta, Victoria, Australia which was predominantly a citrus grove, with cattle as well. The produce from the orchard funded his education as a Boarder at Melbourne Grammar School (where Richard Cotton went on to be appointed onto the Old Melburnians Council. Cotton has donated part of his farm to Trust for Nature, to ensure the land is preserved in its natural state for future generations. Cotton was also a trustee of the Trust for Nature organisation. Whilst on the Board of Trustees, Cotton launched an initiative with the Rural City of Wangaratta's in partnership with Trust for Nature to encourage land owners to undertake permanent protection of remnants of land abutting the Warby Ranges and to ensure their management of these remnants of land is consistent with advice provided by the relevant Trust for Nature Regional Manager. He also remains a foundation supporter of the Glenrowan Football Club.

== Education ==
After leaving boarding school, Cotton studied Agricultural Science at the University of Melbourne, where he entered residence at Trinity College in 1959, and was a member of the 2nd VIII rowing crew. The later years of the course were conducted at the Dookie campus, Victoria's oldest and Australia's second oldest agricultural college.

After graduating BAgrSc in 1963, it was assumed he would head back to assist on the family farm, but he was encouraged to undertake further studies at the University of Melbourne. Cotton began his career in the field of biochemical genetics with bacteria and the synthesis of amino acids, the building blocks of proteins, completing his PhD at the University of Melbourne in 1967. He was a postdoctoral fellow at some of the leading human genetics laboratories in the world, first at the John Curtin School of Medical Research at the Australian National University in Canberra, and then overseas at the Scripps Clinic and Research Foundation in southern California, and the Laboratory of Molecular Biology at the University of Cambridge. He graduated DSc from the University of Melbourne in 1983.

== Career ==
=== Nobel Prize & Discovery that formed foundation of Cancer Treatment Drugs ===
It was during his time in Cambridge that Cotton conceived, planned and executed the fundamental experiment that proved when two immunoglobulin producing cells were fused, the immunoglobulin of both parental cells were produced in the hybrid. This laid the practical and theoretical foundation for the now widely used monoclonal antibody technique for which César Milstein was awarded the Nobel Prize for Physiology or Medicine in 1984. Monoclonal antibodies are now regularly used in all aspects of medical research and clinical practice, and particularly in the treatment of cancer and rheumatoid arthritis and to prevent coagulation during coronary angioplasty. All cancer drugs on the market today with AB in the name are a direct result of Professor Cotton's work. These include Rituximab (trade names Rituxan, MabThera and Zytux).

=== TedX Talk by Professor Richard Cotton ===
Professor Cotton was invited to talk at TedX Sydney in 2011 on the Human Variome Project. The Talk can be viewed on the TedX Website at https://tedxsydney.com/talk/the-human-variome-project/

=== Human Genetic Mutations & PKU ===
Following this discovery, Richard's research focus shifted to the biochemical genetics of human disease and he focused on human genetic mutations, which is the damaging of our genetic material that causes inherited disease and cancer. Richard contributed greatly to identification of the genes for phenylketonuria (PKU) and its variants by conceiving, planning and executing myeloma studies, conceiving affinity adsorbents for PAH (phenylalanine hydroxylase, the enzyme deficient in PKU) & DHPR (di-hydro-folate reductase, also involved in PKU), as well as contributing to tests that are now applied worldwide to all newborns being screened for this disease. He also conceived the widely used tetrahydrobiopterin (BH4) load test to identify the serious genetic variants involved in PKU. This work has since been investigated as a potential treatment for heart disease.

=== Murdoch Children's Research Institute (Founder) ===
In 1986, Professor Richard Cotton, together with Dr David Danks, founded The Murdoch Institute (now named the Murdoch Children's Research Institute) at the Royal Children's Hospital in Melbourne, which brought genetic research to Australia. Their vision for an independent genetic research institute has since grown from a handful of researchers to become a world-class centre of genetics research and clinical genetics services.

In 1991 Professor Cotton initiated the biennial Mutation Detection Conferences and Workshops. These events bring together the world's leading scientists in the fields of mutation detection to exchange ideas and explore further ways of developing these technologies, as well as introduce these technologies and techniques to young scientists around the world.

=== Cleavage: Chemical & Enzymes Mutation Detection Methods (Inventor) ===
He is also the inventor of the chemical cleavage and enzyme cleavage mutation detection methods, at this time the most accurate methods to detect DNA mutations. Professor Cotton encouraged the development of "Mutation Detection" as a distinct field of endeavour in genetics, and has written extensively on the subject.

=== Human Mutation Journal (Founder) ===
In 1992, Professor Cotton founded the scientific journal Human Mutation, which is now a top 20 Genetics and Heredity Journal globally. As he recalls, he founded the journal because he thought it was absurd that researchers and doctors had no place to report and check the severity of the mutations they found in their patients. 25 Years after it was founded, an edition was dedicated to the life of Professor Cotton in the article titled "Infectious Enthusiasm! Larger than Life! That Laugh! That Smile! In Loving Memory of Richard G.H. (Dick) Cotton".

=== The Human Variome Project (Founder) ===
The establishment of Human Mutation lead Cotton and his colleagues globally to begin efforts to unify the field and make the collection of genetic variation information systematic, standardized and complete across all genes. In 1996, to further stimulate activity in this area, Cotton originally set up the Human Genome Organization Mutation Database Initiative. In 2001 this became the Human Genome Variation Society. Then in the early 2000s, closely following the widely acclaimed completion of the Human Genome Project, it became clear that a more active and more internationally focused effort was needed to enable the systematic collection, curation, interpretation and sharing of genetic variation information. From this realization, Cotton founded and launched the Human Variome Project.

The Human Variome Project was established in Melbourne, Australia, in 2006. The delegates that attended the first meeting included the world's top geneticists, clinicians and bioinformaticians and representatives of the World Health Organisation (WHO), OECD, European Commission, United Nations Educational, Scientific and Cultural Organisation (UNESCO), March of Dimes, Centers for Disease Control and Prevention (CDCP), some two dozen international genetics bodies, and numerous genetics journals. >

==== Benefits of the Human Variome Project ====
The Human Variome Project Consortium believes that the global knowledge capacity in medical genetics and genomics can be significantly improved if local knowledge is shared in a free and open manner to become global knowledge. If researchers, clinicians, genetic counsellors, and affected families have fast and reliable access to this type of knowledge, it has the ability to transform medicine by:

- enabling doctors to more rapidly diagnose and treat patients with rare genetic diseases;
- allowing development of new diagnostic tests;
- helping researchers develop new treatments for thousands of genetic diseases; and
- assist in uncovering the causes of common diseases, such as breast cancer and asthma.

Beyond benefits to individual patients, increased understanding of our genomes and their function enables governments to implement effective public health strategies and interventions. A complete understanding of the genomic determinants of health will enable more effective public health strategies, including:

- carrier detection programmes designed to identify potential parents who are at risk of conceiving a child with a genetic disorder;
- pre-conception care provision, including detection of genetic risks through family history, addressing the issue of consanguinity, counselling of preventive strategies such as pre-implantation genetic diagnosis and pre-natal diagnosis;
- routine pre-natal screening identify children with genetic disorders before birth;
- provision of genetic reproductive services such as genetic counselling to assist parents in assessing treatment, reproductive and family planning options; and
- new-born screening programmes to identify children with treatable genetic disorders shortly after birth but before symptoms appear.

The Human Variome Project Consortium is regularly called on to provide expert comment and advice on mutation documentation activities worldwide, including recently by the World Health Organisation.

== Awards, Honors & Recognition ==
=== Order of Australia ===
The importance of the Professor Richard Cotton's contribution to Human Genetics was recognised in 2005 by him being admitted as a Member of the Order of Australia for service to science through genetic research, particularly through the development of technologies to detect gene mutations that underlie birth defects or cause disease and through efforts to document findings.

=== UNESCO & WHO Endorsements ===
The importance of the Human Variome Project was recognised in 2011 by the United Nations Educational, Scientific and Cultural Organisation (UNESCO) in the Project's admittance to Official Partner status.

=== Selywn Smith Medical Research Prize 1991 ===
Richard Cotton was awarded the Selwyn-Smith Medical Research Prize in 1991 for his entry based on DNA probes, Mutation (Biology) and RNA

== Richard G. H. Cotton Memorial Fund ==
The Richard G.H. Cotton Memorial Fund was established to support the ongoing work of the Human Variome Project, in memory of him as the Founding Patron. Further details can be found at http://www.humanvariomeproject.org/donate.html

== Old Melburnians Dick Cotton Fellowship ==
The Old Melburnians Dick Cotton Fellowship was established by the Old Melburnians Council to honour his memory, with the Fellowship being awarded to a young Old Melburnian who demonstrates Dick's values, commitment, concern for the underdog, enthusiasm for life and desire to make a real difference. Further details can be found at https://www.mgs.vic.edu.au/mg/content/remembering-dick-cotton-om-1958
