= Nick Fisk =

Australian maternal-fetal medicine specialist

Professor Nicholas Fisk AM FAHMS FRSN
- Born: September 1956 (age 70)
- Education: University of Sydney (MBBS 1980); University College London (PhD 1992); Imperial College London (MBA 2008)
- Occupations: NED / consultant: R&D / clinical science / commercialisation / healthcare / higher education
- Known for: Fetoplacental disease Fetal microchimerism Fetal pain 'Natural' Caesarean section Semi-identical twins
- Medical career
- Profession: Academic
- Field: Obstetrician & gynaecologist
- Institutions: UNSW
- Sub-specialties: Maternal–fetal medicine

Nicholas Maxwell Fisk (born 1956) is an Australian maternal-fetal medicine specialist, academic and higher education lead. As a researcher, his group has pioneered advances in understanding fetoplacental disease and its treatment, including characterising early human fetal stem cell populations and their lifelong persistence in maternal tissues, documenting “fetal pain” and its blockade by opioid analgesia, and unravelling the vascular basis of twin-to-twin transfusion syndrome. As an obstetrician, Fisk is known for inventing the natural caesarean operation, also referred to as the family centred caesarean section.

Between 2016-24 he was Deputy Vice-Chancellor (Research & Enterprise) at the University of New South Wales (UNSW Sydney), during which time UNSW rose to a top 20 position in the QS rankings, and cemented its role as Australia's lead university for new start up/spin out companies.

== Early life and career ==
Nicholas Fisk was educated at St Ignatius College Riverview, the University of Sydney (MBBS 1980), University College London (PhD 1992) and Imperial College London (MBA 2008). Fisk was Professor of Obstetrics & Fetal Medicine (1992-2007) at Queen Charlotte's Hospital and Imperial College London, where his laboratory and clinical research program achieved an international reputation in fetal diagnosis and treatment.

He returned to Australia in 2008 as the inaugural Director of the Centre for Clinical Research at the University of Queensland, where between 2010-2016 he served as Executive Dean of the Faculties of Health, Medicine and Biomedical Sciences. From 2000-2001 he was President of the International Fetal Medicine and Surgery Society and from 2016-2020 Chair of the Association for Academic Health Centers International (AAHCI Steering Committee). He was elected to the Fellowship of the Academy of Health and Medical Sciences in 2014. In 2020 he was appointed a Member of the Order of Australia for significant service to tertiary education, and to maternal-fetal medicine. Nationally he has chaired the Go8 Deputy Vice-Chancellor's (Research) committee and the Go8 Deans of Medicine Committee and continues to serve on the Board of Research Australia (from 2016).

== Expertise and advocacy ==
Fisk’s research area is human fetoplacental disease and its treatment, including fetal stem cells, fetal “pain", and monochorionic (identical) twins. In 2019, Fisk and Michael Gabbett, along with their group, documented the likely genetic basis of semi-identical twins, with identical maternal DNA, but paternal DNA from different sperms. Fisk has published over 300 research papers, and served on the editorial boards of PLoS Medicine and Human Reproduction. As an influential clinician, he is known for promoting the natural caesarean operation, and as an advocate for women’s right to choose their mode of delivery. His research on fetal pain has been used by both sides in the abortion debate.

As a research leader, he has promoted proportionate research integrity reforms, defence trade controls, and indirect cost block funding, introduced a Living Wage for PhD students, and with Ian Jacobs developed the annual Aggregate Ranking of Top Universities.
