= Australasian Association of Clinical Geneticists =

Genetics organisation

- Formation: 1995
- Field: Medical Genetics
- Chair: Himanshu Goel
- Parent organization: Human Genetics Society of Australasia
- Website: aacg.org.au

The Australasian Association of Clinical Geneticists (AACG) is a professional membership organization for medical specialists who are qualified to work in the field of clinical genetics. The Association was founded in 1995. As of 2021, the organization had approximately 180 members. The Association's members include fully qualified clinical geneticists from Australia and New Zealand as well as individuals training in the field from those jurisdictions. The Association is a Special Interest Group of the Human Genetics Society of Australasia (HGSA).

== Mission ==
The AACG's mission is to:

- serve as a special interest group of the HGSA.
- provide representation for members of the HGSA who work in the field of clinical genetics in Australia and New Zealand to the HGSA and to other relevant bodies (e.g. the Royal Australasian College of Physicians (RACP)).

== Purpose ==
The purpose of the AACG is to:

- provide professional representation, on behalf of the HGSA, to external bodies on matters relating to clinical genetics.
- provide clinical expertise and advice to government and policymakers on all matters relating to medical and clinical genetics.
- develop and maintain professional standards in the field of clinical genetics.
- promote and support teaching and education for individuals training and working in the field of clinical genetics in Australia and New Zealand.

== AACG Biannual Meeting ==
The AACG's Biannual Meeting is the only National meeting of clinical geneticists in the region. The meeting brings specialists in the field together in the one place for education, clinical case discussions, and professional networking. The March meeting is held in an Australian capital city, on a rotational basis, and consists of an educational day for trainees plus a day for clinical case discussion for all members. A business meeting of the AACG is also held. The second meeting of the year is held concurrently with the Annual Scientific Meeting of the HGSA. The Association's annual general meeting is held at this time.

== Prizes ==
The Association awards prizes to its trainees based on merit. The Association's highest honor, awarded annually since 2015, is the Nigel Clarke Memorial Bursary, established in memory of clinical geneticist and researcher Dr Nigel Clarke. Several prizes are also awarded at the HGSA annual scientific meeting for best oral and/poster presentations.

== Education and Professional Development ==
The AACG promotes awareness of human genetics, advocates for genetic health care equity, acts as the peak clinical body in Australia and New Zealand to advise on professional education and curricula, and provides specialist advice on human genetic healthcare to governments and policymakers.

As the peak professional body representing clinical genetics physicians/paediatricians in Australia and New Zealand, the AACG advises the Royal Australasian College of Physicians on training requirements in clinical genetics.

== Past Presidents of the AACG ==
- 1995-1996 Agnes Bankier OAM (VIC)
- 1996-1998 Alison Colley (NSW)
- 1998-2002 Martin Delatycki (VIC)
- 2002-2004 Graeme Suthers (SA)
- 2004-2006 Matt Edwards (NSW)
- 2006-2008 Mary-Louise Freckmann (NSW)
- 2009-2011 David R. Mowat (NSW)
- 2011-2013 Julie McGaughran (QLD)
- 2013-2015 Elizabeth Thompson (SA)
- 2015-2017 Fiona Mackenzie (WA)
- 2017-2019 Michael Gabbett (QLD)
- 2019-2021 Yemima Berman (NSW)
- 2021-2023 Jason Pinner (NSW)
- 2023-2025 Gemma Poke (NZ)
- 2025-present Himanshu Goel (NSW)
