= Public health genomics =

Field of study

Public health genomics is the use of genomics information to benefit public health. This is visualized as more effective preventive care and disease treatments with better specificity, tailored to the genetic makeup of each patient. According to the Centers for Disease Control and Prevention (U.S.), Public Health genomics is an emerging field of study that assesses the impact of genes and their interaction with behavior, diet and the environment on the population's health.

This field of public health genomics is less than a decade old. A number of think tanks, universities, and governments (including the U.S., UK, and Australia) have started public health genomics projects. Research on the human genome is generating new knowledge that is changing public health programs and policies. Advances in genomic sciences are increasingly being used to improve health, prevent disease, educate and train the public health workforce, other healthcare providers, and citizens.

== Public policy ==
Public policy has protected people against genetic discrimination, defined in Taber's Cyclopedic Medical Dictionary (2001) as unequal treatment of persons with either known genetic abnormalities or the inherited propensity for disease; genetic discrimination may have a negative effect on employability, insurability and other socio-economic variables. Public policy in the U.S. that protect individuals and groups of people against genetic discrimination include the Americans with Disabilities Act of 1990, Executive Order 13145 (2000) that prohibits genetic discrimination in the workplace for federal employees, and the Genetic Information Nondiscrimination Act of 2008.

Main public concerns regarding genomic information are that of confidentiality, misuse of information by health plans, employers, and medical practitioners, and the right of access to genetic information. Concerns also exist about the equitable deployment of public health genomics, and attention is needed to ensure that the implementation of genomic medicine does not further entrench social‐equity concerns.

== Ethical concerns ==
One of the many facets involved in public health genomics is that of bioethics. This has been highlighted in a study in 2005 by Cogent Research, that found when American citizens were asked what they thought the strongest drawback was in using genetic information, they listed "misuse of information/invasion of privacy" as the single most important problem. In 2003, the Nuffield Council on Bioethics published a report, Pharmacogenetics: Ethical Issues. Authors of the document explore four broad categories of ethical and policy issues related to pharmacogenetics: information, resource, equity and control. In the introduction to the report, the authors clearly state that the development and application of pharmacogenetics depend on scientific research, but that policy and administration must provide incentives and restraints to ensure the most productive and just use of this technology. Involving the public in ethical oversight and other ways can improve public trust in public health genomics as well as acceptability of initiatives and ensuring that access to the benefits of genomics research is equitable.

== Genetic susceptibility to disease ==
Single nucleotide polymorphisms (SNPs) are single bases within a gene sequence that differ from that gene's consensus sequence, and are present in a subset of the population. SNPs may have no effect on gene expression, or they can change the function of a gene completely. Resulting gene expression changes can, in some cases, result in disease, or in susceptibility to disease (e.g., viral or bacterial infection).

Some current tests for genetic diseases include: cystic fibrosis, Tay–Sachs disease, amyotrophic lateral sclerosis (ALS), Huntington's disease, high cholesterol, some rare cancers and an inherited susceptibility to cancer. A select few are explored below.

=== Herpesvirus and bacterial infections ===
Since the field of genomics takes into account the entire genome of an organism, and not simply its individual genes, the study of latent viral infection falls into this realm. For example, the DNA of a latent herpesvirus integrates into the host's chromosome and propagates through cell replication, although it is not part of the organism's genome, and was not present at the birth of the individual.

An example of this is found in a study published in Nature, which showed that mice with a latent infection of a herpesvirus were less susceptible to bacterial infections. Murine mice were infected with murine gammaherpesvirus 68 and then challenged with the Listeria monocytogenes bacterium. Mice that had a latent infection of the virus had an increased resistance to the bacteria, but those with a non-latent strain of virus had no change in susceptibility to the bacteria. The study went on to test mice with murine cytomegalovirus, a member of the betaherpesvirinae subfamily, which provided similar results. However, infection with human herpes simplex virus type-1 (HSV-1), a member of the alphaherpesvirinae subfamily, did not provide increased resistance to bacterial infection. They also used Yersinia pestis (the causative agent of the Black Death) to challenge mice with a latent infection of gammaherpesvirus 68, and they found the mice did have an increased resistance to the bacteria. The suspected reason for this is that peritoneal macrophages in the mouse are activated after latent infection of the herpesvirus, and since macrophages play an important role in immunity, this provides the mouse with a stronger, active immune system at the time of bacterial exposure. It was found that the latent herpesvirus caused an increase in interferon-gamma (IFN-γ) and tumor necrosis factor-alpha (TNF-α), cytokines which both lead to activation of macrophages and resistance to bacterial infection.

=== Influenza and Mycobacterium tuberculosis ===
Variations within the human genome can be studied to determine susceptibility to infectious diseases. The study of variations within microbial genomes will also need to be evaluated to use genomics of infectious disease within public health. The ability to determine if a person has greater susceptibility to an infectious disease will be valuable to determine how to treat the disease if it is present or prevent the person from getting the disease. Several infectious diseases have shown a link between genetics and susceptibility in that families tend to have heritability traits of a disease.

During the course of the past influenza pandemics and the current influenza epizootic there has been evidence of family clusters of disease. Kandun, et al. found that family clusters in Indonesia in 2005 resulted in mild, severe and fatal cases among family members. The findings from this study raise questions about genetic or other predispositions and how they affect a person's susceptibility to and severity of disease. Continued research will be needed to determine the epidemiology of H5N1 infection and whether genetic, behavioral, immunologic, and environmental factors contribute to case clustering.

Host genetic factors play a major role in determining differential susceptibility to major infectious diseases of humans. Infectious diseases in humans appear highly polygenic with many loci implicated but only a minority of these convincingly replicated. Over the course of time, humans have been exposed to organisms like Mycobacterium tuberculosis. It is possible that the human genome has evolved in part from our exposure to M. tuberculosis. Animal model studies and whole genome screens can be used to identify potential regions on a gene that suggest evidence of tuberculosis susceptibility. In the case of M. tuberculosis, animal model studies were used to suggest evidence of a locus which was correlated with susceptibility, further studies were done to prove the link between the suggested locus and susceptibility. The genetic loci that have been identified as associated with susceptibility to tuberculosis are HLA-DR, INF-γ, SLC11A1, VDR, MAL/TIRAP, and CCL2. Further studies will be needed to determine genetic susceptibility to other infectious diseases and ways public health officials can prevent and test for these infections to enhance the concept of personalized medicine.

=== Type 1 Diabetes, immunomics, and public health ===
The term genomics, referring to the organism's whole genome, is also used to refer to gene informatics, or the collection and storage of genetic data, including the functional information associated with the genes, and the analysis of the data as combinations, patterns and networks by computer algorithms. Systems biology and genomics are natural partners, since the development of genomic information and systems naturally facilitates analysis of systems biology questions involving relationships between genes, their variants (SNPs) and biological function. Such questions include the investigation of signaling pathways, evolutionary trees, or biological networks, such as immune networks and pathways. For this reason, genomics and these approaches are particularly suited to studies in immunology. The study of immunology using genomics, as well as proteomics and transcriptomics (including gene profiles, either genomic or expressed gene mRNA profiles), has been termed immunomics.

Accurate and sensitive prediction of disease, or detection during early stages of disease, could allow the prevention or arrest of disease development as immunotherapy treatments become available. Type-1 diabetes markers associated with disease susceptibility have been identified, for example HLA class II gene variants, however possession of one or more of these genomic markers does not necessarily lead to disease. Lack of progression to disease is likely due to the absence of environmental triggers, absence of other susceptibility genes, presence of protective genes, or differences in the temporal expression or presence of these factors. Combinations of markers have also been associated with susceptibility to type-1 diabetes however again, their presence may not always predict disease development, and conversely, disease may be present without the marker group. Potential variant genes (SNPs) or markers that are linked to the disease include genes for cytokines, membrane-bound ligands, insulin and immune regulatory genes.

Meta-analyses have been able to identify additional associated genes, by pooling a number of large gene datasets. This successful study illustrates the importance of compiling and sharing large genome databases. The inclusion of phenotypic data in these databases will enhance discovery of candidate genes, while the addition of environmental and temporal data should be able to advance the disease progression pathways knowledge. HUGENet, which was initiated by the Centers for Disease Control and Prevention (U.S.), is accomplishing the integration of this type of information with the genome data, in a form available for analysis. This project could be thought of as an example of 'metagenomics', the analysis of a community's genome, but for a human rather than a microbial community. This project is intended to promote international data sharing and collaboration, in addition to creating a standard and framework for the collection of this data.

=== Nonsyndromic hearing loss ===
Variations within the human genome are being studied to determine susceptibility to chronic diseases, as well as infectious diseases. According to Aileen Kenneson and Coleen Boyle, about one sixth of the U.S. population has some degree of hearing loss. Recent research has linked variants in the gap junction beta 2 (GJB2) gene to nonsyndromic prelingual sensorineural hearing loss. GJB2 is a gene encoding for connexin, a protein found in the cochlea. Scientists have found over 90 variants in this gene and sequence variations may account for up to 50% of nonsyndromic hearing loss. Variants in GJB2 are being used to determine age of onset, as well as severity of hearing loss.

It is clear that there are also environmental factors to consider. Infections such as rubella and meningitis and low birth weight and artificial ventilation, are known risk factors for hearing loss, but perhaps knowing this, as well as genetic information, will help with early intervention.

Information gained from further research in the role of GJB2 variants in hearing loss may lead to newborn screening for them. As early intervention is crucial to prevent developmental delays in children with hearing loss, the ability to test for susceptibility in young children would be beneficial. Knowing genetic information may also help in the treatment of other diseases if a patient is already at risk.

Further testing is needed, especially in determining the role of GJB2 variants and environmental factors on a population level, however initial studies show promise when using genetic information along with newborn screening.

== Genomics and health ==
=== Pharmacogenomics ===
The World Health Organization has defined pharmacogenomics as the study of DNA sequence variation as it relates to different drug responses in individuals, i.e., the use of genomics to determine an individual's response. Pharmacogenomics refers to the use of DNA-based genotyping in order to target pharmaceutical agents to specific patient populations in the design of drugs.

Current estimates state that 2 million hospital patients are affected by adverse drug reactions every year and adverse drug events are the fourth leading cause of death. These adverse drug reactions result in an estimated economic cost of $136 billion per year. Polymorphisms (genetic variations) in individuals affect drug metabolism and therefore an individual's response to a medication. Examples of ways in which genetics may affect an individual's response to drugs include: drug transporters, metabolism and drug interactions. Pharmacogenetics may be used in the near future by public health practitioners to determine the best candidates for certain drugs, thereby reducing much of the guesswork in prescribing drugs. Such actions have the potential to improve the effectiveness of treatments and reduce adverse drug events.

=== Nutrition and health ===
Nutrition is very important in determining various states of health. The field of nutrigenomics is based on the idea that everything ingested into a person's body affects the genome of the individual. This may be through either upregulating or downregulating the expression of certain genes or by a number of other methods. While the field is quite young there are a number of companies that market directly to the public and promote the issue under the guise of public health. Yet many of these companies claim to benefit the consumer, the tests performed are either not applicable or often result in common sense recommendations. Such companies promote public distrust towards future medical tests that may test more appropriate and applicable agents.

An example of the role of nutrition would be the methylation pathway involving methylene tetrahydrofolate reductase (MTHFR). An individual with the SNP may need increased supplementation of vitamin B12 and folate to override the effect of a variant SNP. Increased risk for neural tube defects and elevated homocysteine levels have been associated with the MTHFR C677T polymorphism.

In 2002, researchers from the Johns Hopkins Bloomberg School of Public Health identified the blueprint of genes and enzymes in the body that enable sulforaphane, a compound found in broccoli and other vegetables, to prevent cancer and remove toxins from cells. The discovery was made using a "gene chip," which allows researchers to monitor the complex interactions of thousands of proteins on a whole genome rather than one at time. This study was the first gene profiling analysis of a cancer-preventing agent using this approach. University of Minnesota researcher Sabrina Peterson, coauthored a study with Johanna Lampe of the Fred Hutchinson Cancer Research Center, Seattle, in October 2002 that investigated the chemoprotective effect of cruciferous vegetables (e.g., broccoli, brussels sprouts). Study results published in The Journal of Nutrition outline the metabolism and mechanisms of action of cruciferous vegetable constituents, discusses human studies testing effects of cruciferous vegetables on biotransformation systems and summarizes the epidemiologic and experimental evidence for an effect of genetic polymorphisms (genetic variations) in these enzymes in response to cruciferous vegetable intake.

=== Healthcare and genomics ===
Members of the public are continually asking how obtaining their genetic blueprint will benefit them, and why they find that they are more susceptible to diseases that have no cures.

Researchers have found that almost all disorders and diseases that affect humans reflect the interplay between the environment and their genes; however we are still in the initial stages of understanding the specific role genes play on common disorders and diseases. For example, while news reports may give a different impression, most cancer is not inherited. It is therefore likely that the recent rise in the rates of cancer worldwide can be at least partially attributed to the rise in the number of synthetic and otherwise toxic compounds found in our society today. Thus, in the near future, public health genomics, and more specifically environmental health, will become an important part of the future healthcare-related issues.

Potential benefits of uncovering the human genome will be focused more on identifying causes of disease and less on treating disease, through: improved diagnostic methods, earlier detection of a predisposing genetic variation, pharmacogenomics and gene therapy.

For each individual, the experience of discovering and knowing their genetic make-up will be different. For some individuals, they will be given the assurance of not obtaining a disease, as a result of familial genes, in which their family has a strong history and some will be able to seek out better medicines or therapies for a disease they already have. Others will find they are more susceptible to a disease that has no cure. Though this information maybe painful, it will give them the opportunity to prevent or delay the on-set of that disease through: increased education of the disease, making lifestyle changes, finding preventive therapies or identifying environmental triggers of the disease. As we continue to have advances in the study of human genetics, we hope to one day incorporate it into the day-to-day practice of healthcare. Understanding one's own genetic blueprint can empower oneself to take an active role in promoting their own health.

Genomics and understanding of disease susceptibility can help validate family history tool for use by practitioners and the public. Institute of Medicine (IOM) is validating the family history tool for six common chronic diseases (breast, ovarian, colorectal cancer, diabetes, heart disease, stroke). Validating cost effective tools can help restore importance of basic medical practices (e.g. family history) in comparison to technology intensive investigations.

=== The genomic face of immune responses ===
A critical set of phenomena that ties together various aspects of health interventions, such as drug sensitivity screening, cancer or autoimmune susceptibility screening, infectious disease prevalence and application of pharmacologic or nutrition therapies, is the systems biology of the immune response. For example, the influenza epidemic of 1918, as well as the recent cases of human fatality due to H5N1 (avian flu), both illustrate the potentially dangerous sequence of immune responses to this virus. Also well documented is the only case of spontaneous "immunity" to HIV in humans, shown to be due to a mutation in a surface protein on CD4 T cells, the primary targets of HIV. The immune system is truly a sentinel system of the body, with the result that health and disease are carefully balanced by the modulated response of each of its various parts, which then also act in concert as a whole. Especially in industrialized and rapidly developing economies, the high rate of allergic and reactive respiratory disease, autoimmune conditions and cancers are also in part linked to aberrant immune responses that are elicited as the communities' genomes encounter swiftly changing environments. The causes of perturbed immune responses run the gamut of genome-environment interactions due to diet, supplements, sun exposure, workplace exposures, etc. Public health genomics as a whole will absolutely require a rigorous understanding of the changing face of immune responses.

=== Newborn screening ===
The experience of newborn screening serves as the introduction to public health genomics for many people. If they did not undergo prenatal genetic testing, having their new baby undergo a heel stick in order to collect a small amount of blood may be the first time an individual or couple encounters genetic testing. Newborn genetic screening is a promising area in public health genomics that appears poised to capitalize on the public health goal of disease prevention as a primary form of treatment.

Most of the diseases that are screened for are extremely rare, single-gene disorders that are often autosomal recessive conditions and are not readily identifiable in neonates without these types of tests. Therefore, often the treating physician has never seen a patient with the disease or condition and so an immediate referral to a specialty clinic is necessary for the family.

Most of the conditions identified in newborn screening are metabolic disorders that either involve i) lacking an enzyme or the ability to metabolize (or breakdown) a particular component of the diet, like phenylketonuria, ii) abnormality of some component of the blood, especially the hemoglobin protein, or iii) alteration of some component of the endocrine system, especially the thyroid gland. Many of these disorders, once identified, can be treated before more severe symptoms, such as mental retardation or stunted growth, set in.

Newborn genetic screening is an area of tremendous growth. In the early 1960s, the only test was for phenylketonuria. In 2000, roughly two-thirds of states in the US screened for 10 or fewer genetic diseases in newborns. Notably, in 2007, 95% of states in the US screen for more than 30 different genetic diseases in newborns. Especially as costs have come down, newborn genetic screening offers "an excellent return on the expenditure of public health dollars".

Because the risks and benefits of genomic sequencing for newborns are still not fully understood, the BabySeq Project, led by Robert C. Green of Brigham and Women's Hospital and Alan H. Beggs of Boston Children's Hospital (BCH) has been gathering critical research on newborn sequencing since 2015 as part of the Newborn Sequencing In Genomic Medicine and Public Health Consortium (NSIGHT), which received a five-year grant of $25 million from the National Institute of Child Health and Human Development (NICHD) and the National Human Genome Research Institute (NHGRI).

=== Understanding traditional healing practices ===
Genomics will help develop an understanding of the practices that have evolved over centuries in old civilizations and which have been strengthened by observations (phenotype presentations) from generation to generation, but which lack documentation and scientific evidence. Traditional healers associated specific body types with resistance or susceptibility to particular diseases under specific conditions. Validation and standardization of this knowledge/ practices has not yet been done by modern science. Genomics, by associating genotypes with the phenotypes on which these practices were based, could provide key tools to advance the scientific understanding of some of these traditional healing practices.

== See also ==
- American Journal of Public Health
- Community health
- Nutritional genomics
- GRaPH-Int

== Bibliography ==
- "Genome-based Research and Population Health. Report of an expert workshop held at the Rockefeller Foundation Study and Conference Center, Bellagio, Italy, 14–20 April 2005" (PDF). Archived from the original on January 7, 2008.
- Brand, A; et al. (2006). "Getting Ready for the Future: Integration of Genomics into Public Health Research, Policy and Practice in Europe and Globally". Community Genetics. 9 (1): 67–71. doi:10.1159/000090696. PMID 16490962. S2CID 22952412.
- Burke, W (July 2006). "The path from genome-based research to population health: Development of an international public health genomics network". Genetics in Medicine. 8 (7): 451–458. doi:10.1097/01.gim.0000228213.72256.8c. PMID 16845279. S2CID 863513.
- Khoury, MJ (December 1996). "From Genes to Public Health: The Applications of Genetic Technology in Disease Prevention". American Journal of Public Health. 86 (12): 1717–1722. doi:10.2105/ajph.86.12.1717. PMC 1380723. PMID 9003127.
- ten Kate LP: Editorial. Community Genet 1998; 1: 1–2.
- Beauchamp, Tom L.; et al. (2001). Principles of Biomedical Ethics (5th ed.). New York: Oxford University Press. ISBN 978-0195143324.
- Kandun, IN; et al. (23 November 2006). "Three Indonesian Clusters of H5N1 Virus Infection in 2005". New England Journal of Medicine. 355 (21): 2186–2194. doi:10.1056/NEJMoa060930. hdl:10722/45196. PMID 17124016.
- Hill, Adrian V.S. (2006). "Aspects of Genetic Susceptibility to Human Infectious Diseases". Annual Review of Genetics. 40: 469–486. doi:10.1146/annurev.genet.40.110405.090546. PMID 17094741.
- Bellamy, R (April 2006). "Genome-wide approaches to identifying genetic factors in host susceptibility to tuberculosis". Microbes and Infection. 8 (4): 1119–1123. doi:10.1016/j.micinf.2005.10.025. PMID 16513396.
