= Grant Robert Sutherland =

Australian geneticist (born 1945)

Grant Robert Sutherland AC FAA FRS
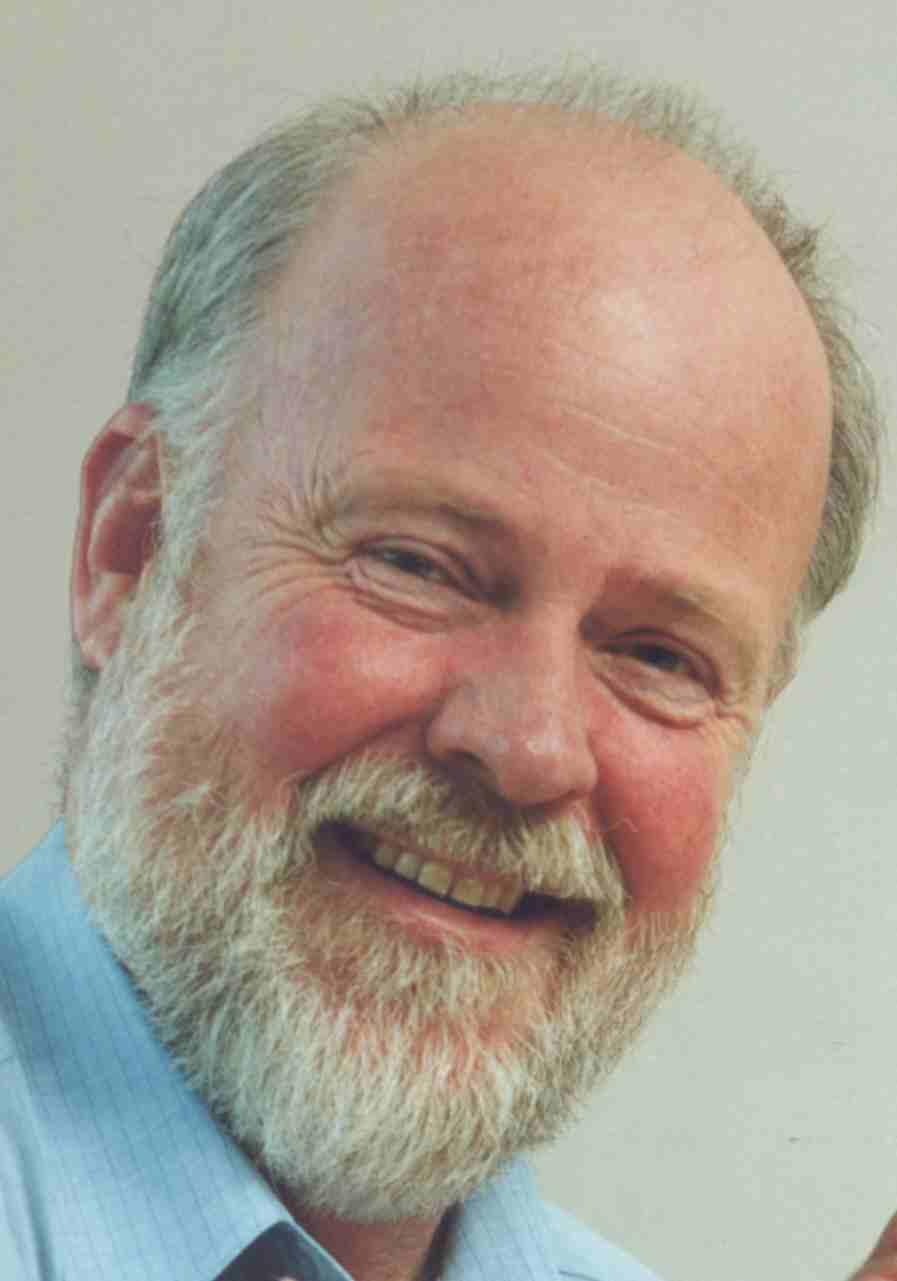
- Born: 2 June 1945 (age 81); Bairnsdale, Australia
- Education: University of Melbourne (BSc), (MSc); University of Edinburgh (PhD), (D.Sc.)
- Known for: Discovery of chromosomal fragile sites, Cloning of chromosome 16
- Awards: Australia Prize (1998), Centenary Medal (2001), Australian Achiever (2001), Companion of the Order of Australia (1998)
- Scientific career
- Fields: Human Genetics
- Workplaces: Women's and Children's Hospital, University of Adelaide
- Thesis: Studies in human genetics and cytogenetics (DSc)
- Website: www.adelaide.edu.au/robinson-research-institute/about-us/researchers/emeritus-faculty#professor-grant-sutherland-ac

Grant Robert Sutherland AC (born 2 June 1945) is a retired Australian human geneticist and cytogeneticist. He was the Director, Department of Cytogenetics and Molecular Genetics, Adelaide Women's and Children's Hospital for 27 years (1975-2002), then became the Foundation Research Fellow there until 2007. He is an Emeritus Professor in the Departments of Paediatrics and Genetics at the University of Adelaide.

He developed methods to allow the reliable observation of fragile sites on chromosomes. These studies culminated in the recognition of fragile X syndrome as the most common familial form of intellectual impairment, allowing carriers to be identified and improving prenatal diagnosis. Clinically, his book on genetic counselling for chromosome abnormalities has become the standard work in this area. He is a past President of the Human Genetics Society of Australasia and of the Human Genome Organisation.

== Early life and education ==
Sutherland was born in Bairnsdale, Victoria, on 2 June 1945. His father had served as a soldier in World War II and qualified for the soldier settlement farm scheme; as such, when Grant was 12, the family moved to a dairy farm at Numurkah. As a teenager, he bred budgerigars, which he credits for starting his interest in genetics. After completing at Numurkah High School, he left home and moved to Melbourne.

He studied at the University of Melbourne, graduating in 1967 with a BSc major in genetics and a sub-major in zoology. During vacations, he worked at the CSIRO as a technician, in the team that was developing a vaccine for contagious bovine pleuropneumonia. Still at the University of Melbourne, he went on to graduate with a MSc in 1971. He undertook his doctoral studies at the University of Edinburgh, graduating with a PhD in 1974 and a DSc in 1984, presenting the thesis Studies in human genetics and cytogenetics

== Career ==
After graduating with his BSc in 1967, Sutherland starting work as a cytogeneticist in the Chromosome Laboratory of the Mental Health Authority, Melbourne. In 1971, he became the Cytogeneticist-in-Charge in the Department of Pathology, Royal Hospital for Sick Children, Edinburgh, a role he held until 1974.

After graduating with his PhD, in 1975, Sutherland took up the role of Director of the Department of Cytogenetics and Molecular Genetics at the Women's and Children's Hospital (WCH) in Adelaide. In 2002, he moved to the role of Foundation Research Fellow at WCH, a position which he held until 2007.

In 1990, he also took on the role of Affiliate Professor in the Departments of Paediatrics and Genetics, University of Adelaide, and became Emeritus Professor in 2017.

=== Research ===
While at WCH, Sutherland's principal focus was on chromosomal fragile sites. Large family studies of genetic diseases revealed unexpected patterns, where some men were "carriers" who did not display the disease themselves but passed it on to their daughters. This was contrary to conventional genetic wisdom: "There was no way a male could pass on an X-linked disease without having it himself, or so we thought," Sutherland said. "We'd go to medical conferences with photos of these men, photos of their businesses and copies of their university degrees to show the sceptics they were normal. They didn't believe that a male could have this genetic mutation and be OK."

The explanation was in the DNA, which Sutherland commenced mapping in detail. He found that the fragile X fault behaved differently to most genetic mutations; it builds up as it replicates through generations until it reaches a threshold where the full-blown syndrome is triggered. Such a disease mechanism, where genetic abnormalities accumulate until they reach a critical level, had not been observed before. He developed techniques to observe fragile sites, which allowed him to specify critical DNA fragments on the fragile X chromosome and led him to identify fragile X syndrome as the most common cause of hereditary intellectual disability; in Australia it affects about 60 children each year. These findings allowed him to improve diagnostic tools and techniques, making identification of carriers more reliable and ultimately improving prenatal diagnosis.

As part of the Human Genome Project, his group mapped much of chromosome 16 and positional cloning of genes on this chromosome.

In 1998, Sutherland and Associate Professor Eric Haan discovered Sutherland–Haan Syndrome, which is another genetic disease that causes intellectual and physical problems among males. In 2004, they identified the specific genetic sequences that cause the condition. The discovery means that future generations who are at risk will be able to know if they are carriers and to test in utero for the disease.

The proposal of prenatal testing to diagnose genetic diseases has sometimes been controversial for Sutherland, because it raises the question of what to do if problems are detected.

=== Service to professional organisations ===
Sutherland was the president of the Human Genome Organization (HUGO) from 1996 to 1997, and he was involved in establishing the professional body in 1977, which grew into the Human Genetics Society of Australasia, and he served as its president from 1989 to 1991.

== Recognition ==
In the 1998 Australia Day Honours, Sutherland was appointed a Companion of the Order of Australia (AC) for service to science and in 2001, he was awarded a Centenary Medal.

Other significant awards include:

- 1983 - Fulbright Senior Scholar
- 1996 - Julian Wells Lecture and medal, Australian Genome Conference Board 1996
- 1996 - Orator, Errol Solomon Meyers Memorial Lecture, The University of Queensland Medical Society
- 1998 - Australia Prize (later renamed the Prime Minister's Prize) for Science (joint winner with three others in the field of genetics)
- 2001 - Macfarlane Burnet Medal and Lecture, Australian Academy of Science
- 2001 - Ramaciotti Medal for Excellence in Biomedical Research
- 2004 - Included in "The Magnificent Seventeen, Giants of Australian research" having the most highly cited papers across all fields
- 2013 - Honorary Doctor of Medicine awarded by the University of Adelaide
- 2013 - The Australian National Health and Medical Research Council named him an "all-time high achiever"

Since 1994 he has been an Honorary Fellow of the Royal College of Pathologists of Australasia. Professional society fellowships include the Royal Society of London (1996) and the Australian Academy of Science (1997). In 2005, the Human Genetics Society of Australasia introduced the annual "Sutherland Lecture" in his honour, allowing outstanding mid-career researchers to showcase their work.

== Publications ==
=== Journal articles ===
Scopus lists 458 documents by Sutherland, and calculates his h-index as 83.

=== Books ===
- Sutherland, Grant R.; Hecht, Frederick (1985). Fragile sites on human chromosomes. New York: Oxford University Press. ISBN 9780195035421.
- Gécz, Jozef; Sutherland, Grant R., eds. (2003). Nucleotide and protein expansions and human disease. Basel: Karger. ISBN 3-8055-7621-8.
- Gardner, R. J. M.; Sutherland, G. R. (1989). Chromosome abnormalities and genetic counseling (First ed.). New York: Oxford University Press. ISBN 0-19-504932-2.
- Gardner, R. J. M.; Sutherland, G. R. (1996). Chromosome abnormalities and genetic counseling (Second ed.). New York: Oxford University Press. ISBN 0-19-510615-6.
- Gardner, R. J. M.; Sutherland, G. R. (2004). Chromosome abnormalities and genetic counseling (Third ed.). New York: Oxford University Press. ISBN 0-19-514960-2.
- Gardner, R. J. McKinlay; Sutherland, Grant R.; Shaffer, Lisa G. (2012). Chromosome abnormalities and genetic counseling (Fourth ed.). Oxford: Oxford University Press. ISBN 9780195375336.
