= International Congress of Human Genetics =

The International Congress of Human Genetics is the foremost meeting of the international human genetics community. The first Congress was held in 1956 in Copenhagen, and has met every five years since then with the exception of the 2021 meeting which was postponed for two years because of the global COVID-19 pandemic. The Congress is held under the auspices of the International Federation of Human Genetics Societies, an umbrella organization founded by the American Society of Human Genetics, the European Society of Human Genetics and the Human Genetics Society of Australasia. Congresses have been held in such diverse venues as Berlin, Brisbane, Chicago, The Hague, Jerusalem, Mexico City, Paris, Rio de Janeiro, Vienna and Washington.

The purview of the International Congress of Human Genetics is all aspects of human genetics, including research, clinical practice, and education. The Congress now attracts thousands of participants, including M.D. medical geneticists, Ph.D. human geneticists and genetic counselors from 80 or more countries. It is by far the largest human genetics meeting in the world.
