= Margaret Garson =

Australian cytogeneticist, pathologist, and educator (1927–2020)

- Born: 4 October 1927; Benalla, Victoria, Australia
- Died: 17 May 2020 (aged 92)
- Other names: Olga Margaret Garson; Margaret Barnett
- Education: University of Melbourne
- Scientific career
- Workplaces: The Alfred Hospital; University of Texas; University of Melbourne; St Vincent's Hospital

Olga Margaret Garson AO (4 October 1927 – 17 May 2020), better known as Margaret Garson, was an Australian physician and cytogenetics researcher.

== Academic career ==
Olga Margaret Garson was born on 4 October 1927 in Benalla, Victoria.

She graduated from the University of Melbourne in 1951 and undertook further training in haematology and pathology. She was employed as pathology registrar at The Alfred Hospital from 1954 to 1957. She accompanied her husband to the United States in 1961 and worked as research fellow at the University of Texas. Returning to Melbourne in 1964 she was research fellow at the University of Melbourne in the Department of Medicine at St Vincent's Hospital. Her work in cytogenetics continued there and she was promoted to Director of the Department of Cytogenics in 1982 until her retirement in 1992.

Garson was president of Haematology Society of Australia in 1988–89 and was later made a life member of the Haematology Society of Australia and New Zealand. In 1981 she was the first woman to be invited to give the Carl de Gruchy Oration. She was elected president of the Human Genetics Society of Australasia (HGSA) in 1991 and gave the HGSA lecture, titled "Seven little Australians", in the same year.

In the 1993 Queen's Birthday Honours Garson was appointed Officer of the Order of Australia for "service to medical research and education, particularly in the field of cytogenetics". In 2015 the University of Melbourne recognised her contribution with a Doctor of Medical Science (honoris causa).

== Works ==
- Garson, O. Margaret (1989), A chromosomal study of long term exposure to radio frequency radiation [report], Sydney Worksafe Australia
- Barnett, Margaret Garson (October 2015), Dr Margaret Garson Barnett AO : memoir, [Fitzroy, Victoria] Margaret Barnett (published 2015), ISBN 978-0-646-94504-0

== Personal ==
Garson's husband, Dr John Sadler Barnett, predeceased her in August 2004. Garson died on 17 May 2020.
