= Human Genetics Society of Australasia =

Professional organization

- Formation: 1977
- Legal status: Incorporated under the Associations Incorporation Act S.A (1985)
- Headquarters: Sydney, Australia
- Field: Human Genetics
- Staff: https://www.hgsa.org.au/Web/Web/About/Secretariat.aspx
- Website: hgsa.org.au

The Human Genetics Society of Australasia (HGSA) is a membership organization for individuals in the field of human genetics who primarily practise in the Oceania region. Members typically hold both a qualification in human genetics and work in the field. Membership is drawn from clinical, laboratory and academic specialties. Members include clinical geneticists; genetic counsellors; laboratory scientists (molecular, cytogenetic and biochemical genetics); and academics (lecturers and researchers).

== Objectives ==
The objectives of the Society are to:

- ensure high ethical standards among those working in Human Genetics
- facilitate communication between those working in Human Genetics
- provide training and professional recognition for those involved in Human Genetics
- support professional and lay education about Human Genetics
- promote public awareness of Human Genetics
- consider and comment upon matters relevant to Human Genetics or the interests of the Society
- represent the interests of Human Genetics and those working in the field, and of the Society and its members, in public, professional, governmental and other forums
- promote and support research in Human Genetics.

== History ==
The Human Genetics Society of Australasia was founded subsequent to the growth in the field of genetics that occurred during the mid-twentieth century. During this time, the role that genetics plays in human health and disease became increasingly recognized. Genetic diagnostic techniques (in particular, in cytogenetics) were progressing rapidly. This coincided with the appreciation by medical specialists that genetic disorders, especially inborn errors of metabolism and birth defects, were of clinical interest.

In 1976, a meeting in clinical genetics was held as part of the celebrations of the Centenary Year of the Adelaide Children's Hospital. The meeting involved several high-profile international speakers, most of the senior medical practitioners with an interest in heritable disease working in Australia and New Zealand, and delegates of the annual meeting of local cytogeneticists. The group agreed that a small working group should be charged with setting up a human genetics society for the region. Subsequently, the Human Genetics Society of Australasia was formally incorporated in South Australia in 1977 to serve the Australia and New Zealand region. The original group consisted of 19 Foundation Members, paying just $A10 per annum for membership.

== Governance and structure ==
The HGSA is governed by a council, presided over by the president. The day-to-day strategic decision making is undertaken by an executive of council, consisting of the president, vice-president, treasurer and secretary. The Society employs a chief executive officer to run the administrative functions of the organization.

Executive members of HGSA council are elected to their positions by popular vote from the membership. The remainder of the council is representative of the membership. The jurisdictions are represented by the chairpersons of HGSA branches, while the special interest groups are represented by their chairs.

Council has the capacity to establish committees to undertake long-term high-level activities of the society. Longstanding committees include the Scientific Programme Committee; Annual Scientific Meeting Local Organising Committee; and the Education, Ethics and Social Issues Committee.

== Membership ==
As of 2021, the organization had approximately 1200 members. Persons wishing to become members of the Society must be nominated for membership by two existing voting members. Membership then must be endorsed by the Chair of the jurisdictional Branch in which the applicant lives. In the case of overseas applicants, it is the role of the Council Executive to approve admission to the Society.

Most members also belong to at least one of the five Special Interest Groups of the Society that represent members' primary field of practice in human genetics:

- Australasian Association of Clinical Geneticists
- Australasian Society of Diagnostic Genomics
- Australasian Society of Genetic Counsellors
- Australasian Society for Inborn Errors of Metabolism
- Australasian Cancer Genetics Group

== HGSA annual scientific meeting ==
The Annual Scientific Meeting of the HGSA is a conference of international regard. It has been held annually since 1977, usually in early August. The meeting features plenary presentations from invited international experts in the field of human genetics.

The conference provides a forum for members to showcase their own work in the fields of clinical genetics; genetic counselling; molecular genomics; cytogenomics; biochemical genomics and inborn errors of metabolism; ethics, legal and social issues; and education. A satellite day is held prior to the meeting for the Special Interest Groups to each hold a meeting of their own.

The Society's two peak events, the HGSA Oration and the Sutherland Lecture, are both delivered at the meeting.

== Awards and honours ==
The HGSA honours one eminent member annually by inviting them to present the HGSA Oration at the Annual Scientific Meeting. Additionally, one outstanding mid-career researcher is invited to deliver a presentation at the Annual Scientific Meeting to showcase their work in the Sutherland Lecture, named in honour of Prof Grant Sutherland.

Each year, the membership is invited to nominate eminent retiring members to Emeritus Membership of the Society. Nominations are called for members who have contributed significantly to the running and welfare of the Society for a Service Award. HGSA Council scrutinizes and considers these nominations before awarding.

== Education and professional development ==
The HGSA oversees professional training and certification in the fields of Diagnostic Genomics and Genetic Counseling. Two Boards of Censors oversee training in these two respective fields. The HGSA partners with the Royal College of Pathologists of Australasia to train senior diagnostic genomicists to become Fellows of the Faculty of Science.

The Australasian Association of Clinical Geneticists (AACG), a Special Interest Group of the HGSA, has direct ties with the Royal Australasian College of Physicians (RACP), which is the body that oversees training and accreditation in clinical genetics in Australasia. The AACG advises the RACP on curricula and training requirements. In addition, members of the AACG supervise the clinical training of RACP trainees in clinical genetics. The AACG also oversees a lecture series for clinical genetics trainees.

The HGSA hosts a large number of educational events throughout the year to help members undertake continuing professional development. In addition to the Society's Annual Scientific Meeting, members have access to a large number of webinars that are broadcast across Australia and New Zealand. Furthermore, each Branch holds face-to-face educational activities, such as lectures and symposia, for local members.

== Regulatory functions ==
The HGSA oversees the regulation of the genetic counselling profession throughout Australia and New Zealand. The profession self-regulates under the auspices of the National Alliance of Self-Regulation Health Professions. The HGSA maintains a register of appropriately qualified genetic counsellors, accredits and records their mandatory continuing professional development activities, and provides a mechanism to deal with professional concerns and complaints of genetic counsellors.

== Policy and advocacy ==
As the pre-eminent body representing human genetics in Oceania, the HGSA authors numerous policies and position statements to guide practitioners in the region. Such documents cover diverse topics such as genomic testing; screening for genetic disorders; ethical practice in genomics; genetic education; and clinical service delivery.

In addition, the HGSA actively comments on policy and guidelines authored by other institutions and provides expert advice to government and genomic regulatory authorities.

== See also ==
- List of Annual Scientific Meetings of the Human Genetics Society of Australasia
- List of presidents of the Human Genetics Society of Australasia
- List of HGSA Orations
