= Carapetis =

Carapetis is a surname. Notable people with the surname include:

- Alex Carapetis
- Elena Carapetis, Australian actress and writer
- Jonathan Carapetis (born 1961), Australian paediatric physician
