= Nicola Newton =

Prof. Nicola Newton is the Director of Prevention at the Matilda Centre for Research in Mental Health and Substance Use at the University of Sydney, Australia.

== Career ==
Newton's work in the field of school-based prevention programs includes the development of the first effective web-based programs to prevent substance use as well as her exploration on expanding such programs to include student as well as parenting components.

In 2018, Newton launched an eHealth program along with Prof. Maree Teesson, Dr Katrina Champion and colleagues at the University of New South Wales to target the six main lifestyle risk factors among young people, including binge eating and unhealthy eating, to help prevent chronic disease.

Newton is co-lead of the OurFutures Vaping program which has a demand-reduction approach to prevent e-cigarette use in young people. The OurFutures Vaping program aims to use a harm-minimisation and social influence approach to empower young people to avoid vaping. In 2024, The Hon Mark Butler MP (Minister for Health and Ageing, Australian Government) announced that Australia's first evidence-based vaping prevention program (OurFutures Vaping) is to be rolled out as part of a national program for year 7 and 8 students in more than 3,000 schools across Australia.

== Honours and recognition ==
- University of New South Wales, Faculty of Medicine, Dean's Rising Star Award 2012
- Australasian Society for Psychiatric Research, AFFIRM Early Career Researcher Award 2012
- Australian Institute of Policy & Science (AIPS) NSW Young Tall Poppy Science Award 2014
- National Drug and Alcohol Research Centre, Ian Webster Award for Research Excellence 2015
- Australian Rotary Health and Alliance for the Prevention of Mental Disorders, Early Career Research Award 2015
- Society for Mental Health Research, Rising Star Award 2016
- Australian Drug Foundation, National Alcohol and Other Drugs Excellence and Innovation Awards, Innovation in Prevention and Education Award 2017 for ‘Climate Schools’ (team award; lead)
- Australian Drug Foundation, National Alcohol and Other Drugs Excellence and Innovation Awards, Primary Prevention Award 2019 for ‘Preventure’, 2019 (team award; lead)
- The Australasian Professional Society on Alcohol and other Drugs (APSAD), Early Mid-Career Researcher (EMCR) Award 2019 for the most cited paper in the Drug & Alcohol Review journal, ‘A systematic review of combined student and parent-based programs to prevent alcohol and other drug use among adolescents’
- The University of Sydney, Researcher Accelerator Award (SOAR), 2020-2021
- The Australasian Professional Society on Alcohol and other Drugs (APSAD) Mid Career Award in 2021
- The Mental Health Services Learning Network of Australia and New Zealand, Mental Health Promotion/Mental Illness Prevention Service Award 2021 for ‘Climate Schools: health and wellbeing programs’ (team award; lead)
- The University of Sydney, Talented Researcher Fellowship, Nov 2023-Oct 2024
- Mental Health Matters Youth Award 2023 for ‘OurFutures’ – Highly Recommended (team award; lead)
- The OurFutures team. Australian Rotary Health (ARH) Mental Health Impact Award 2024 (team award; lead)
- Listed as team member on one of 10 of the best National Health and Medical Research Council (NHMRC) Research Projects in 2024
