= Kerryn =

Kerryn or Keryn is a given name, popular in Australia. Notable people with the name include:

- Kerryn Manning (born 1976), Australian horse trainer/driver
- Kerryn McCann (1967–2008), Australian athlete.
- Kerryn Phelps (born 1957), Australian medical practitioner and public commentator.
- Kerryn Rim (born 1962), Australian biathlete.
- Kerryn Tolhurst (born 1948), Australian musician and songwriter.
- Keryn Jordan (1975–2013), South African footballer.
- Keryn Williams (born 1949), Australian medical scientist and ophthalmology researcher.
