= Fabienne Mackay =

Australian immunologist and researcher (born 1965)

Fabienne Mackay is a French Australian research immunologist and institutional leader within the Australian medical research, education and innovation sectors. She has been a Director and the CEO of QIMR Berghofer in Brisbane, Queensland) since 2020, after being the inaugural Head of the School of Biomedical Sciences at the University of Melbourne (Victoria, Parkville campus) during the preceding five years. She is also an Honorary Professor at the Faculties of Medicine of the University of Queensland and the University of Melbourne. Her work has attracted public attention for its contribution to the pathophysiological understanding and treatment of lupus and other autoimmune diseases. Mackay has been notably awarded, achieving international reputation for her widely cited research describing B-cell activating factor (BAFF) and other cytokines of the TNF receptor superfamily, and their roles in B cell physiology, autoimmunity and cancer. She is an elected Fellow of the Australian Academy of Health and Medical Sciences.

== Biography ==
Mackay was born in Maine et Loire in 1965. She was diagnosed with Hodgkin's disease at 17, this event may have sparked her interest in medical research.

== Education ==
Mackay's formal education proceeded mostly in France. She completed high school (Baccalauréat D) at Lycée de jeunes filles de Moulins (1983). Between 1984 and 1986 she pursued the PCEM-1 program at Clermont-Ferrand Medical School, graduating in Biological Technology at the Institut Universitaire de Technologie Clermont-Ferrand, and in Biological Engineering at the Université de Clermont II. She obtained a doctorate degree (Ph.D.) in Immunology and Cell Biology at Louis Pasteur University (Strasbourg) in 1994 under the direction of Diane J. Mathis.

== Career ==
Mackay started her professional career as a scientist at the Basel Institute for Immunology, (Switzerland, 1989-1991). She spent the following three years as a PhD Student at Hoffman La Roche (Basel) and the Faculty of Medicine, Louis Pasteur University (Strasbourg). From 1994 to 2000 she worked as a scientist and project leader at Biogen Idec Inc. (Cambridge, MA, USA). From 2001 to 2006 she was a Research Fellow ascribed to the Arthritis and Inflammation Research Program, at the Garvan Institute of Medical Research (Darlinghurst, NSW, Australia). From 2006 to 2008 she was the Director of the Autoimmunity Research Unit at the Garvan Institute. Between 2009 and 2015 she worked at Monash University, (Melbourne), occupying positions as Head and Chair of the Department of Immunology, and Deputy Head of its Central Clinical School. From 2015 to 2020 she worked at the School of Biomedical Sciences, University of Melbourne, firstly as Head of the Department of Pathology (until 2017), then as Head of the School of Biomedical Sciences, Parkville Campus. She is currently the Director and CEO of the QIMR Berghofer Medical Research Institute, and an Honorary Professor at the Faculties of Medicine at the University of Queensland, and the University of Melbourne.

Her discovery of B-cell activating factor (BAFF) and its role in the pathophysiology of autoimmune diseases provided foundations for the development of belimumab (TM Benlysta, an anti-BAFF monoclonal antibody), a milestone therapy approved in 2011 for the treatment Systemic Lupus Erythematosus.

Some of her research papers rank among the most cited in the field, and have been highlighted for their importance by the respective journal editors in various opportunities. Her laboratory has deserved extensive funding by sponsoring bodies such as the National Health and Medical Research Council of Australia.

She is known to advocate for the recognition of women scientist efforts and accomplishments, her professional profile is featured in Women in STEMM Australia. A Fabienne Mackay Grant Award to promote gender equality was established in 2021 to benefit women independent researchers in the School of Biomedical Sciences, University of Melbourne.

== Works ==
=== Papers ===
Mackay has published over 200 papers in peer-reviewed journals, which have been cited over 30 thousand times. Some of her most cited papers are:

- Mackay, F.; Woodcock, S. A.; Lawton, P.; Ambrose, C.; Baetscher, M.; Schneider, P.; Tschopp, J.; Browning, J. L. (1999). "Mice transgenic for BAFF develop lymphocytic disorders along with autoimmune manifestations". The Journal of Experimental Medicine. 190 (11): 1697–1710. doi:10.1084/jem.190.11.1697. PMID 10587360
- Schneider, P.; MacKay, F.; Steiner, V.; Hofmann, K.; Bodmer, J. L.; Holler, N.; Ambrose, C.; Lawton, P.; Bixler, S.; Acha-Orbea, H.; Valmori, D. (1999). "BAFF, a novel ligand of the tumor necrosis factor family, stimulates B cell growth". The Journal of Experimental Medicine. 189 (11): 1747–1756. doi:10.1084/jem.189.11.1747. PMID 10359578
- Groom, Joanna; Kalled, Susan L.; Cutler, Anne H.; Olson, Carl; Woodcock, Stephen A.; Schneider, Pascal; Tschopp, Jurg; Cachero, Teresa G.; Batten, Marcel; Wheway, Julie; Mauri, Davide (2002). "Association of BAFF/BLyS overexpression and altered B cell differentiation with Sjögren's syndrome". The Journal of Clinical Investigation. 109 (1): 59–68. doi:10.1172/JCI14121. PMID 11781351
- Mackay, Fabienne; Schneider, Pascal; Rennert, Paul; Browning, Jeffrey (2003). "BAFF AND APRIL: a tutorial on B cell survival". Annual Review of Immunology. 21: 231–264. doi:10.1146/annurev.immunol.21.120601.141152. PMID 12427767
- Maslowski, Kendle M.; Vieira, Angelica T.; Ng, Aylwin; Kranich, Jan; Sierro, Frederic; Yu, Di; Schilter, Heidi C.; Rolph, Michael S.; Mackay, Fabienne; Artis, David; Xavier, Ramnik J. (2009). "Regulation of inflammatory responses by gut microbiota and chemoattractant receptor GPR43". Nature. 461 (7268): 1282–1286. doi:10.1038/nature08530. PMID 19865172

=== Book chapters ===
- Angehrn P, Banner D, Braun T, d'Arcy A, Gehr G, Gentz R, Mackay F, E.J. Schlaeger, H.J. Schoenfeld, H. Loetscher and W. Lesslauer. 1993. Two distinct TNF receptors in health and disease. In Tumor Necrosis Factor:molecular and cellular biology and clinical relevance, Fiers W., Buurman W.(eds) Karger, Basel, pages 33–39, ISBN 978-0123979339.
- Mackay F, Sierro F, Grey S, Gordon T. 2005. The BAFF/APRIL system: an important player in systemic rheumatic diseases. In B Cell Trophic Factors and B Cell Antagonism in Autoimmune Disease, Stohl, W., editor, Curr. Dir. Autoimm., 8:243-265, ISBN 978-3-8055-7851-6.
- Tangye SL, Mackay F. 2005. B cells and Autoimmunity, in The Autoimmune Diseases, edited by Noel Rose and Ian Reay Mackay, 4th ed, pages 139-156, ISBN 978-0125959612.
- Mackay F, Gommerman J. 2015. The role of lymphotoxin and the BAFF/APRIL system in B-lymphocytes. In Molecular Biology of B cells. Eds. Tasuku Honjō, Michael Reth, A. Radbruch, Frederick W. Alt, Elsevier. 2nd Edition. 251-276, ISBN 978-0-12-397933-9.

=== Opinion ===
Mackay's public opinion on diverse subjects including autoimmune diseases and women in science can be found online.

=== Patents ===
Mackay is an inventor to nearly a hundred assigned patents, many of them related to discoveries on BAFF receptors and their pharmacological modulation

== Membership ==
Mackay is an editorial board member of many medical scientific journals including Science (journal), European Journal of Immunology, Current Research in Immunology, Antibodies, and the Journal of Inflammation. She is also a corporate board member at Brisbane Diamantina Health Partners and ENA Respiratory Among learned and technical bodies, she is a Council Member of the Australian Academy of Health and Medical Sciences, a Member of the Medical Advisory Board for the Gairdner Foundation (Canada), an Award committee member of the International Cytokine & Interferon Society, a Member of the Queensland Genomics Executive Working Group, and a Member of the QIMR Berghofer Council.

== Awards ==
Notable accolades conferred on Mackay include the Thomson Reuters Australia Citation and Innovation Award (2012), the Trophy for exceptional contribution in education and research as a French expatriate, by the French Ministry of Foreign Affairs (2014), her election as a Fellow of the Australian Academy of Health and Medical Sciences (2016), the Martin Lackmann Award for Translational Research given by the Cell Signaling and its Therapeutic Implications CSTI program, Monash University (2017), and the Vincent Fairfax Fellowship (2018-2019).
