= Arun Sharma (computer scientist) =

Computer science academic

Arun Sharma is an Indian Australian computer science professor. He is a distinguished emeritus professor at the Queensland University of Technology and chairs the Council of QIMR Berghofer. He is the Group Head for Sustainability and Climate Change, and Advisor to the Chairman of Adani Group. He was a cofounder of Australia's National ICT Research Centre of Excellence (NICTA), and Director of the Translational Research Institute (Australia). In the course of his institutional duties, Sharma played a significant role in the development of Australian technology research capability, the promotion of translational research in agriculture and biosciences within Queensland, and the fostering of international technological research cooperation between Australia and India. Sharma's professional achievements have been recognized by awards by the Premier of Queensland, the Office of the Chief Scientist (Australia), the India Australia Business & Community Awards (IABCA), the Birla Institute of Technology & Science, and the Royal Order of Australia. He was born in the town of Banmankhi in the Indian state of Bihar.

== Education ==
Sharma completed All-India Secondary (1978) and Senior School (1980) Certificates in Goalpara, Assam and New Delhi. He obtained a Master of Science degree in Computer Science from Birla Institute of Technology and Science, Pilani in 1985, and a Ph.D. degree in Computer Science from the State University of New York at Buffalo in 1990 under the supervision of Professor John Case, now at the Department of Computer Science, University of Delaware. Sharma is a graduate of the Australian Institute of Company Directors (2008).

== Career ==
Sharma began his academic career as a research and teaching assistant while still a graduate student at Buffalo, and was a research assistant for a year at the Department of Computer and Information Sciences, University of Delaware (1989-1990) prior to completing his Ph.D. Shortly after his doctorate degree, he was a Post-Doctoral Research Associate at the Department of Brain and Cognitive Sciences, Massachusetts Institute of Technology for 6 months (1990-1991). He then moved to Sydney (Australia) to work at the School of Computer Science and Engineering, University of New South Wales (UNSW), initially as a Visiting Fellow, soon after as a tenured Lecturer (1992), and successively as a Senior Lecturer (1994), Associate Professor (1998), Head of School (1999-02) and Full Professor (2000-2004). While at UNSW he was named as the Node Director Designate, Sydney Node (2002-2003), and was appointed to the role of Vice President and Director of Sydney Research Lab (2003-2004) within National ICT Australia (NICTA), Australia's national Centre of Excellence in information and communications technology, which became part of Data61 division of CSIRO.

In 2004 he was recruited by the Queensland University of Technology (QUT) as a Deputy Vice-Chancellor (Research and Commercialisation), a position continuously held until 2019, when he became Deputy Vice-Chancellor and Vice President (Research and Innovation). At QUT he was named Distinguished Professor in April 2019, and further designated Distinguished Professor Emeritus in August 2019.

In 2011 he became National Chair of the Australia India Business Council (AIBC), after leading the Queensland Chapter of the AIBC as its President during 2005-10.

Since 2011 he has been associated with the Adani Group, where he has been a Member of the Board, North Queensland Export Terminal Limited (previously Adani Abbot Point Terminal Ltd), and (since 2020) Group Head of Sustainability and Climate Change, and Advisor to the Chairman.

Sharma's research contributions have been at the intersection of Theoretical Computer Science and Artificial Intelligence, especially the fields of Computational Learning Theory and Algorithmic Learning Theory that focus on mathematical frameworks for analyzing the capability and limits of Machine Learning. During the 1990s, Sharma had a very productive collaboration with Professor Sanjay Jain that led to significant new results in E Mark Gold's paradigm of language identification in the limit. As a result of these contributions, Jain and Sharma were invited by MIT Press to coauthor the second edition of the classic first edition of the book Systems That Learn by Osherson, Stob, and Weinstein.

He was appointed as an inaugural member of the independent Advisory Council of the Australian Research Council (2008–09). He was a member of the World Economic Forum's Global Future Council on Innovation Ecosystems. He was the Champion of Team Queensland that participated in the MIT Regional Entrepreneurship Acceleration Program (REAP).

Through his policy papers and newspaper articles, Sharma has played a significant role in doctrinal advocacy at the intersection of research, entrepreneurship and economic development.

== Publications ==
=== Books ===
==== Authored ====
- Systems that learn: an introduction to learning theory. S, Jain, D. N. Osherson, J. S. Royer & A. Sharma (Authors), 2nd ed., Cambridge, Mass.: MIT Press. 1999. ISBN 978-0-262-27625-2. OCLC 44962421. The book has been favorably reviewed by Robert H. Sloan, Rūsiņš Mārtiņš Freivalds and Clark Glymour.

==== Edited ====
- Algorithmic learning theory : 7th international workshop, ALT '96, Sydney, Australia, October 23-25, 1996 : proceedings. S. Arikawa, Arun K. Sharma. Berlin: Springer. 1996. ISBN 3-540-61863-5. OCLC 35646512.
- Algorithmic learning theory : 11th international conference, ALT 2000 Sydney, Australia, December 11–13, 2000, proceedings. Hiroki Arimura, Sanjay, February 22- Jain, Arun K. Sharma. Berlin: Springer. 2000. ISBN 3-540-41237-9. OCLC 45223566.
- Computing and combinatorics : 6th annual international conference, DZ Du COCOON 2000, Sydney, Australia, July 26–28, 2000 : proceedings. D. Du, P. Eades, V. Estivill-Castro, X. Lin, & A. Sharma . Berlin: Springer. 2000. ISBN 3-540-67787-9. OCLC 44468885

== Awards ==
- Premier of Queensland Special Award at the 2010 Queensland Export Awards.
- Included in the Knowledge Nation 100 List, 2015, published by the Office of the Chief Scientist.
- Lifetime Achievement Award at the 2018 India Australia India Business and Community Awards.
- Distinguished Alumnus Award from Birla Institute of Technology & Science, Pilani, 2019.
- Member of the Order of Australia in 2019 Queen's Birthday Honours for services to Computer Science and Information Technology.
