= Subbarao =

Subbarao or Subba Rao (Telugu: సుబ్బారావు, Kannada: ಸುಬ್ಬ ರಾವ್), sometimes spelled SubbaRow or Subba Row, is an Indian name.

== People with the name ==
- Adurthi Subba Rao (1912–1975), Telugu film director
- B. A. Subba Rao (fl. 1950–1987), Telugu film director and producer
- B. R. Subba Rao (1925–2020), Entomologist
- Duvvuri Subbarao (born 1949), Indian economist and central banker
- Ganugapati Sree Rama Subba Rao (born 1937), Indian natural product chemist
- Govindarajula Subba Rao (1895–1959), Telugu theater and film actor
- I. V. Subba Rao (scientist) (1934–2010), Indian agriculturist
- Kakarla Subba Rao (1925–2021), Indian radiologist
- Kanta Subbarao, Indian virologist, molecular geneticist, and physician-scientist
- Katta Subba Rao (1940–1988), Telugu film director
- Koka Subba Rao (1902–1976), Chief Justice of the Supreme Court of India
- Mathukumalli V. Subbarao (1921–2006), Indo-Canadian mathematician
- Nanduri Venkata Subba Rao (1895–1957), Telugu poet
- Nyapati Subba Rao Pantulu (1856–1941), Indian politician and social activist
- Ponnada Subba Rao, Indian politician and lawyer.
- Raman Subba Row (1932–2024), English cricketer
- Rayaprolu Subba Rao (1892–1984), Indian poet
- Tata Subba Rao (born 1942), British statistician
- Tallapragada Subba Row (1856–1890), Indian theosophist and lawyer
- Taluku Ramaswami Subba Rao (1920–1984), Kannada novelist and scholar
- Yellapragada Subbarow (1895–1948), Indian biochemist
