= Kanta Subbarao =

Indian virologist and physician

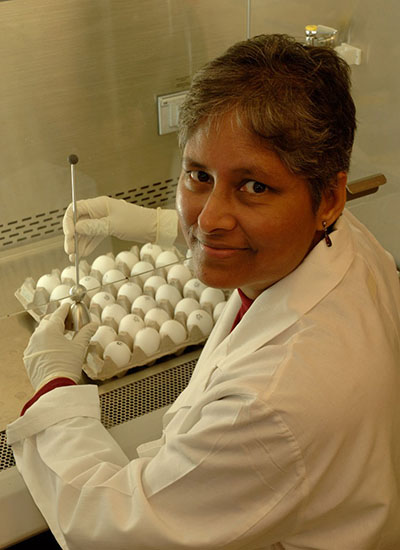
- Subbarao in 2006
- Education: Christian Medical College Vellore; University of Oklahoma
- Scientific career
- Fields: Virology, molecular genetics
- Workplaces: National Institute of Allergy and Infectious Diseases; World Health Organization; Doherty Institute; Université Laval

Kanta Subbarao is an Indian virologist, molecular geneticist, and physician-scientist. She is director of the World Health Organization collaborating centre for reference and research on influenza. Subbarao is also a professor at the Doherty Institute.

== Life ==
Subbarao received a M.B.B.S. from Christian Medical College Vellore and a M.P. H. in epidemiology from the University of Oklahoma.

She is a virologist, physician-scientist, and molecular geneticist. Subbarao was convinced to join the influenza program at the National Institute of Allergy and Infectious Diseases (NIAID) when all of the positions in the respiratory syncytial virus program, which she wanted to join, were filled. She served as chief of the NIAID Emerging Respiratory Viruses Section. She is an elected fellow of the American Academy of Microbiology and the Infectious Diseases Society of America. In 2016, she joined World Health Organization collaborating centre for reference and research on influenza. She is a professor at the Doherty Institute. Subbarao became an elected fellow of the Australian Academy of Health and Medical Sciences in 2021. In 2024, she joined Université Laval in Canada through a Canada Excellence Research Chair in Biology and Control of Zoonotic and Pandemic Respiratory Viruses . She received in 2025 the Edward Jenner Award from the Vaccine Congress.
