= Non-pharmacological intervention =

Health care intervention that does not use medication

A non-pharmacological intervention (NPI) is any type of healthcare intervention which is not primarily based on medication. Some examples include exercise, sleep improvement, and dietary habits.

Non-pharmacological interventions may be intended to prevent or treat (ameliorate or cure) diseases or other health-related conditions, or to improve public health. They can be educational and may involve a variety of lifestyle or environmental changes. Complex or multicomponent interventions use multiple strategies, and they often involve the participation of several types of care providers. Non-pharmacological interventions can call on various fields of expertise, such as surgery, medical devices, rehabilitation, psychotherapy, and behavioral interventions.

Some categories of NPI include: "Social, psychological, physical, lifestyle, environmental, or addressing psychosocial behaviors"

== Examples ==
=== Hypertension ===
The first line of treatment for hypertension is lifestyle changes, including dietary changes, physical exercise, and weight loss. Although these have all been recommended in scientific advisories, a Cochrane systematic review of available relevant studies found that although weight-loss diets did reduce body weight and blood pressure, beneficial effects of those changes could not be demonstrated, owing to the small number of participants and studies, and that therefore the impact of weight loss on mortality and morbidity is unknown. Their potential effectiveness is similar to and at times exceeds a single medication. If the blood pressure is high enough to justify immediate use of medications, lifestyle changes are still recommended in conjunction. Dietary changes shown to reduce blood pressure include diets containing low amounts of sodium, the DASH diet (Dietary Approaches to Stop Hypertension), vegetarian diets, and green tea consumption. Physical exercise regimens that reduce blood pressure include isometric resistance exercise, aerobic exercise, resistance exercise, and device-guided breathing.

=== Chronic Pain ===
Non-pharmacological intervention treatments for chronic pain can be an effective tool for managing pain. A systematic review found that exercise has a small improvement for function for those with chronic back pain and osteoarthritic pain while having a moderate improvement on function for those with Fibromyalgia. Yoga was found to have moderate positive impact on functioning for people with chronic lower back pain.

See also

- Disease surveillance
- Environmental medicine
- Global Health Initiatives
- Health education
- Health policy
- Health promotion
- Human nutrition
- Hygiene
- Infant mortality
- Infection control
- Lifestyle medicine
- Medical device
- Occupational therapy
- Physical medicine and rehabilitation
- Population health
- Prevention of mental disorders
- Preventive healthcare
- Psychotherapy
- Public health intervention
- Social determinants of health
- Social prescribing
- Transmission (medicine)
- Universal health care
- Workplace health promotion
