= Rock Eisteddfod Challenge =

Australian dance and drama challenge

- Status: Defunct
- Genre: Dance and drama challenge
- Date: 1980–2012
- Frequency: Annually
- Country: Australia
- Years active: 31–32 years
- Founder: NSW Arts Council
- Most recent: November 2012
- Participants: ~100,000 per annum (peak)
- Patron: Rock Eisteddfod Challenge Foundation
- People: Notable alumni: Heath Ledger; Jackie O (radio host)
- Sponsors: 2SM, Coca-Cola, the NSW Arts Council; Federal and State government health and education departments
- Website: rockchallenge.com.au

The Rock Eisteddfod Challenge, also known as the Australian Rock Eisteddfod Challenge, was an Australian dance and drama challenge for government-funded high schools that was active between 1980 and 2012. Initiated by the Rock Eisteddfod Challenge Foundation as part of the Global Rock Challenge, the aim of the event was to promote healthy lifestyle choices, particularly abstinence from drugs, alcohol and cigarettes. The event started in Sydney, New South Wales in 1980 and subsequently spread to other States and territories of Australia and a small number of other countries.

In 2004 an event for primary school students was started, called J Rock, to raise awareness about obesity and other eating disorders by promoting dance as a fun way to exercise.

On 9 February 2010 it was announced that due to lack of funding, the Rock Eisteddfod Challenge would not take place in 2010. The event was subsequently revised, however ceased permanently following the 2012 event. On 30 June 2013 the Rock Eisteddfod Challenge Foundation voluntarily revoked its accreditation as a registered charity with the Australian Charities and Not-for-profits Commission.

In 2013, the Government of Victoria supported the establishment of the Wakakirri School Challenge as a replacement of the Rock Eisteddfod Challenge for Victorian primary and high schools.

== Concept ==
Rock Eisteddfod shows are stories on stage of no longer than eight minutes. Participants can have between 10 and 120 students on stage, as well as up to 20 back stage crew. The entire show is set to a pre-recorded soundtrack of contemporary music, and the aim is to use dancing and drama to tell the story. There are also sets and costumes to be thought of and the performances often combine elements from the whole arts curriculum. Schools choose their own theme and story and work collaboratively with teachers and parents to bring their ideas to life.

While performances are professionally staged events, the Global Rock Challenge is about having fun along the way. Students, teachers, parents and communities work together over many months helping to prepare the school's performance.

Many state government health and education departments put their support behind the event. The Australian Department of Health and Ageing sponsored the Rock Eisteddfod Challenge television specials with various tobacco, alcohol and drug prevention messages for 18 years.

Almost a million young people aged between 11 and 19 years have performed on stage. In 2005, 100,000 young people from 800 schools took part in one of the hundreds of shows staged worldwide.{{}}

In 2006 over 400 schools and 40,000 students competed in 50 Rock Eisteddfod Challenge shows in 17 regions across Australia.

== History ==
Croc Festival logo

The concept began in Sydney in 1980 known as the Rock 'n' Roll Eisteddfod, a NSW Arts Council sponsored-event held at the Hordern Pavilion. The idea was developed by Sydney radio station 2SM and, with support from Coca-Cola, the NSW Arts Council promoted the event as an example of local youth culture in action.

In 1988 the New South Wales Department of Health was the first to see the Rock Eisteddfod as an opportunity to deliver the Quit for life anti-smoking message to secondary school students in New South Wales. At the same time, Kerrie Hayes and Peter Sjoquist AM took over and revitalised the event which became known nationally as the Rock Eisteddfod Challenge. In 1998 the Rock Eisteddfod was televised nationally for the first time on the Nine Network as part of the National Drug Offensive. Novelist Tim Levy was an organiser of the Junior youth competition and hosted it in five cities across Australia.

=== Expansion to other countries ===
In New Zealand, the event was introduced in 1993, where it was branded as the Smokefree Stage Challenge, starting with 20 schools and 2000 participants, and had grown to include 171 schools and 16,381 participants.

In 1995 Inspector Mark Pontin of the Hampshire Constabulary visited Australia on a Churchill Scholarship. Pontin saw the Australian Rock Eisteddfod Challenge first hand and was so impressed that he persuaded the Chief Constable, Sir John Hoddinott, to introduce it to their area of the United Kingdom. In 1996 the inaugural event of the Rock Challenge was staged in Portsmouth with eleven schools and 800 students. This has now turned into a national series of competitions, usually starting in Aberdeen in February and running through many parts of the UK (including London, at the Hackney Empire) until the northern and southern Grand Finals around the end of May / beginning of June.

Rock Eisteddfod events were staged in several locations worldwide. New Zealand, Germany, the U.S. (until 2003), United Kingdom, Japan, the United Arab Emirates and South Africa have all taken up the Global Rock Challenge. A sister event, The Croc Festival, staged a series of festivals in remote and regional areas of Australia, aimed at both indigenous and non-indigenous communities are held each year. In addition to performing, the three-day festivals provide the opportunity for rural and remote students to participate in many health, education, employment, sport, visual and performing activities during the day.

== Outcomes ==
Global Rock Challenge events in each country attempt to deliver specific health and lifestyle themes such as anti-tobacco, drugs and alcohol messages.

A three-year research study by the University of Sydney Department of Public Health and Community Medicine was the first cross-sectional analysis of participating and non-participating students. Professor Don Nutbeam found that participants in the Rock Eisteddfod Challenge in Sydney secondary schools had higher self-esteem than the control group of schools who did not participate in the event; that participants smoked less tobacco and marijuana and drank less alcohol than the control group. Dr Rose Grunstein also found that students in participating schools but not in the actual team also had lower propensities to smoke, drink excessive alcohol or take other drugs.

The Rock Eisteddfod Challenge as an Intervention to Increase Resiliency and Improve Health Behaviours in Adolescents (1999–2001) study examined a sample of 44 Sydney high school students and explained the effectiveness of the events as a youth program.

The overall findings included a lower incidence of drug, marijuana and alcohol use among participating REC students compared to students in non-participating REC schools. Students similarly had an improved sense of identity, belonging, purpose, problem solving skills, and social competence. As an intervention program, the Rock Eisteddfod Challenge improved flexibility, empathy and caring, good communication skills, sense of belonging and sense of purpose. 90% of students from REC schools and 87.5% from control schools knew that the message was an anti-substance abuse message, the study found very positive attitudes toward the REC, particularly amongst those who took an active role in the event.

== Divisions ==
In all Rock Eisteddfod Challenge events there are Open and RAW divisions. In Melbourne and Sydney there is an open, small and premier division.

Introduced in 2006, the RAW Division is the division of the Rock Eisteddfod Challenge which has a 'no set' rule, focusing purely on dance. Participants are encouraged to explore using the human body in order to tell their story, and as a result RAW division has greater emphasis on choreography, dance and drama. Schools may compete in Open/Small/Premier AND Raw divisions.

The Small Teams division was cut out of the competition in 2008 in favor of RAW.

Limits
	J Rock	Small Teams	RAW	Open	Premier
Team Numbers	max 143	max 73	max 128	max 143	20–120
Performers	10–100	10–40	20–100	20–100	
Stage Crew	max 20	max 10	max 5	max 20	
Support Crew	max 20	max 20		max 20	
Maximum Expenditure	$2,500		$2,500	$8,500	$8,500

== See also ==
- Rock Eisteddfod Challenge results
- The Croc Festival
