= Robin Turner =

Robin Turner may refer to:

- Robin Turner (footballer) (1955–2025), English footballer
- Robin Turner (priest) (1942–2023), British Anglican priest and military chaplain, Chaplain-in-Chief and Archdeacon of the Royal Air Force
- Robin Turner (statistician) (born 1976), New Zealand professor of biostatistics
