= Michael F. Good =

Australian doctor

Michael F. Good AO was the Director of the Queensland Institute of Medical Research, from 2000 to 2010. He was Chair of the National Health and Medical Research Council.

He graduated from the Queensland University Medical School in 1978. He later undertook further training in medical research at the Walter and Eliza Hall Institute of Medical Research in Melbourne.

Postdoctoral training was as a visiting scientist at the National Institutes of Health in Bethesda, Maryland. His research interests are in the field of immunity and immunopathogenesis to malaria and group A streptococcus/rheumatic fever, and particularly to the development of vaccines.

Professor Michael Good was appointed Director of the Queensland Institute of Medical Research in 2000.

Since 2006 he was chairperson of the National Health and Medical Research Council. Professor Good is a past president of the Association of Australian Medical Research Institutes and past director of the Cooperative Research Centre for Vaccine Technology.

He is an editor of several scientific journals and an author of more than 250 peer-reviewed publications.

In 2008 Good was awarded an Order of Australia for his services to medical research and in 2009 he received the Eureka Prize for Leadership.

In 2010, Good was a recipient of the Queensland Greats Awards.

Good was elected Fellow of the Australian Academy of Health and Medical Sciences (FAHMS) in 2015.
