= Colette McKay =

Australian cochlear implant researcher

Colette McKay FAHMS
- Born: Australia
- Occupations: Audiologist, academic and researcher
- Title: Leader in Translational Hearing Research at the Bionics Institute

Academic background
- Education: Bachelor of Science (Hons), physics and mathematics Diploma of Audiology; Doctor of Philosophy
- Alma mater: University of Melbourne
- Thesis: The Theory of Scattering from Complex, Energy Dependent Potentials, and Applications (1979)

Academic work
- Institutions: University of Melbourne University of Manchester Aston University Bionics Institute
- Website: https://www.bionicsinstitute.org/team-members/professor-colette-mckay/

Colette McKay is an Australian audiologist, academic and researcher. She leads the translational hearing program at the Bionics Institute of Australia.

She holds honorary appointments at the University of Melbourne Department of Medical Bionics and Department of Otolaryngology.

== Education ==
At 14, encouraged by her physics teacher, McKay wanted to become a nuclear physicist. She went on to complete a Bachelor of Science with Honours at the University of Melbourne followed by a PhD in Physics and Mathematics in 1979. She then undertook clinical training in audiology, completing a Graduate Diploma in Audiology in 1980.

== Research and career ==
McKay undertook research in the Department of Otolaryngology at the University of Melbourne from 1989 to 2004. Her research at this time focussed on psychophysics, speech perception and signal processing in cochlear implants. She then took up the position of chair in Auditory Science at Aston University in Birmingham, England where she implemented an undergraduate degree in audiology. In 2007 she was appointed chair in Applied Hearing Research at the University of Manchester, where she led the Audiology and Deafness Research Group.

In 2013, McKay took up her current role as leader in translational hearing research at the bionics institute. McKay's research team have developed a clinical tool called the EarGenie, which uses near-infrared light to measure how the brains of babies respond to sound. The test will help clinicians determine the best interventions for babies born deaf or hard of hearing.

McKay's work has resulted in six families of patents.

== Awards and honours ==
Elected Fellow of the Acoustical Society of America in 2002

Thomas Simm Littler prize from the British Society of Audiology in 2009

Awarded the 3-year veski innovation fellowship in 2013

Elected Fellow of the Australian Academy of Health and Medical Sciences 2021
