= Kirsten McCaffery =

Public health researcher

- Education: University of Edinburgh; University College London
- Scientific career
- Workplaces: Sydney School of Public Health; University of Sydney
- Thesis: Participation in bowel cancer screening : examination of psychosocial processes (2000)

Kirsten McCaffery is a British-Australian public health researcher who is Principal Research Fellow and Director of Research at the Sydney School of Public Health. Her research considers the psychosocial aspects of over diagnosis in healthcare. She was elected Fellow of the Australian Academy of Health and Medical Sciences in 2020.

== Early life and education ==
McCaffery earned her undergraduate degree in psychology at the University of Edinburgh. She held various research positions, including working in Tanzania and at Cancer Research UK. She decided to do a PhD and pursue a career in research after working as a research associate in the research group of Jane Wardle.

== Research and career ==
McCaffery joined the University of Sydney as a Research Fellow and was eventually appointed Professor of Behavioural Science and Director of Research at the Sydney School of Public Health. Her research considers health literacy and patient communications.

McCaffery founded the Sydney Health Literacy Lab, which seeks to empower people in their health outcomes. Through meta-analyses of health literature, McCaffery has shown that 80% of patients did not understand their home-care instructions 36 hours after leaving hospital, with 40 to 80% of information forgotten almost immediately. She is interested in whether removing the label of 'cancer' in low-risk, likely harmless, conditions could help reduce over-diagnosis.

In October 2020, McCaffery was elected Fellow of the Australian Academy of Health and Medical Sciences. During the COVID-19 pandemic, McCaffery studied disparities in COVID-19 knowledge amongst the Australian population. As with much of the world, those with the greatest burden of chronic disease are the most disadvantaged. She found that these differences in COVID understanding lead to social inequalities in health outcomes. Alongside health literacy, McCaffery studied the pandemic-induced rise and fall of Telehealth, and how to improve the patient experience.

== Selected publications ==
- Vikki A Entwistle; Stacy M Carter; Alan Cribb; Kirsten McCaffery (6 March 2010). "Supporting patient autonomy: the importance of clinician-patient relationships". Journal of General Internal Medicine. 25 (7): 741–745. doi:10.1007/s11606-010-1292-2. ISSN 0884-8734. PMC 2881979. PMID 20213206. Wikidata Q33898754.
- Sian K Smith; Ann Dixon; Lyndal Trevena; Donald Nutbeam; Kirsten McCaffery (19 October 2009). "Exploring patient involvement in healthcare decision making across different education and functional health literacy groups". Social Science & Medicine. 69 (12): 1805–1812. doi:10.1016/j.socscimed.2009.09.056. ISSN 0277-9536. PMID 19846245. Wikidata Q51803612.
- Heather Powell; Vanessa E Murphy; D Robin Taylor; Michael J Hensley; Kirsten McCaffery; Warwick Giles; Vicki Clifton; Peter G Gibson (1 September 2011). "Management of asthma in pregnancy guided by measurement of fraction of exhaled nitric oxide: a double-blind, randomised controlled trial". The Lancet. 378 (9795): 983–990. doi:10.1016/s0140-6736(11)60971-9. ISSN 0140-6736. PMID 21907861. Wikidata Q50787410.
