= John E. J. Rasko =

John E. J. Rasko AO, FRCPA, FFSc (RCPA), FRACP, FAAHMS
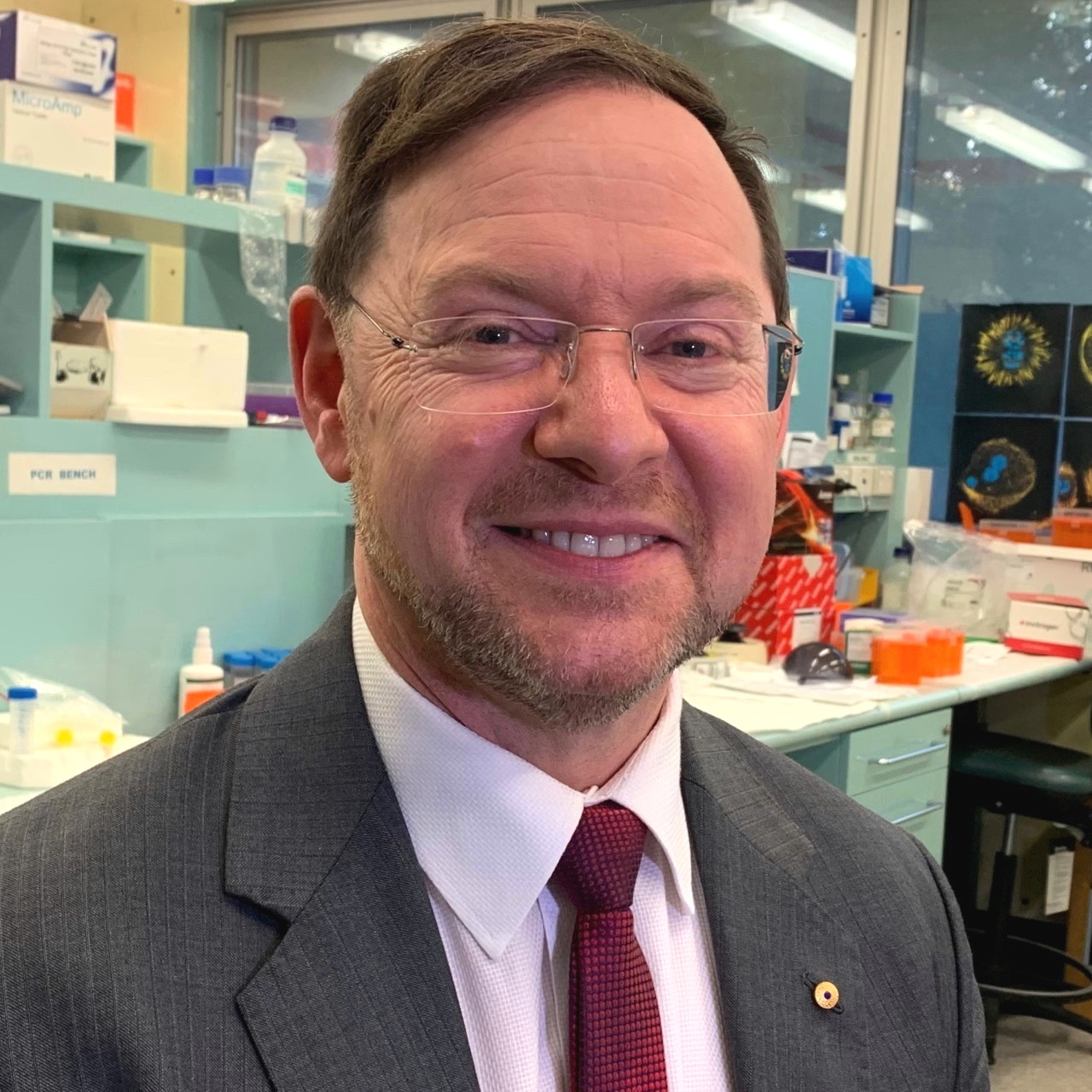
- Scientific career
- Fields: Stem-cell therapy, gene therapy, molecular biology, hematology
- Institutions: Royal Prince Alfred Hospital, Centenary Institute, University of Sydney

John E. J. Rasko (born 1961) is an Australian clinical hematologist, pathologist and scientist whose research focuses on gene and stem cell therapy, experimental haematology and molecular biology. He previously directed the Department of Cell and Molecular Therapies at Royal Prince Alfred Hospital, the Gene and Stem Cell Therapy Program at the Centenary Institute, Sydney, and Sydney Medical School, the University of Sydney. He is a science communicator, often interviewed on Australian radio and television, and is a regular contributor to Breakfast, Radio National, ABC. Rasko delivered the ABC's 2018 Boyer Lectures. Entitled Life Re-engineered, they examined the history and impact of gene and cell therapies.

Rasko is Chair of the Gene Technology Technical Advisory Committee (GTTAC), Office of the Gene Technology Regulator (2008–), and Chaired the Advisory Committee on Biologicals, Therapeutic Goods Administration (2012–15). Contributions to scientific organisations include co-founder (2000) and past-President (2003–05) of the Australasian Gene and Cell Therapy Society (AGCTS); Vice President (2008–12), and President (2018–20), International Society for Cellular Therapy (ISCT), and founder (2009) of ISCT-Australia.

He is a founding board member of the Cure the Future Foundation. He is the Patron of Science for the FSHD Global Research Foundation, committed to the treatment and cure of facioscapulohumeral muscular dystrophy. In 2009, he was instrumental in establishing the first Faculty Committee of the Faculty of Science, Royal College of Pathologists of Australasia, and was a founding Fellow of the Australian Academy of Health and Medical Sciences. He is the recipient of national and international awards in recognition of his medical research, including appointment as an Officer of the Order of Australia.

His 2021 book, Flesh Made New: The Unnatural History and Broken Promise of Stem Cells, co-authored by Carl Power, was longlisted for that year's Walkley Book Award.
