= Lisa Maher =

Professor of Viral Hepatitis Epidemiology

Professor Lisa Maher AM FASSA FAHMS
- Education: BA University of Queensland; MA, PhD Rutgers University
- Known for: Viral hepatitis epidemiology
- Scientific career
- Institutions: University of New South Wales
- Thesis: Dope girls: Gender, race and class in the drug economy (1995)

Lisa Maher is Professor and head of Viral Hepatitis Epidemiology, at the Kirby Institute for Infection and Immunity, at the University of New South Wales and was made Member of the Order of Australia in 2015. She was awarded an Elizabeth Blackburn Fellowship, in Public Health from the NHMRC, in 2014. She is a fellow of the Australian Academy of Health and Medical Sciences.

== Early life and career ==
Maher obtained her BA from the University of Queensland, and MA and PhD from Rutgers. Maher's career involves the viral epidemiology of people who inject drugs, those living with HIV, sex workers as well as marginalised youth. Her research involves preventing infectious diseases within vulnerable populations. Her work includes research on vulnerable people across the world, including those in North America, South East Asia, Australia and the Pacific.

Maher's work on drug use has been reported by the ABC and SBS noting that heroin use caused young daughters to turn away from their families. In the 1990s she filmed and interviewed people using heroin in Cabramatta to report on the epidemic 'and the deeply flawed response by authorities'. Maher's work also includes researching drug use, reporting on the policing of heroin crack-downs, intravenous injections, HIV prevention, and she has a partnership for the CRE for Injecting Drug Use.

The Prime Minister Julia Gillard noted her involvement in the "prevention of infectious disease in vulnerable populations" and "community services such as vaccination, counselling and education."

== Select publications ==
In 2019, Maher had over 280 journal articles, 26 book chapters and two books published. She has also had work published in The Lancet.

=== Books ===
- Maher (1997) Sexed Work: Gender, Race, and Resistance in a Brooklyn Drug Market Oxford University Press.
- Daly K. and Maher L. (editors), (1998) Criminology at the Crossroads: Feminist Readings of Crime and Justice, Oxford University Press, New York

=== Journal articles ===
- Maher and Dixon, (1999) Policing and public health: Law enforcement and harm minimization in a street-level drug market British journal of criminology.
- Grebly, J. et al. (2014) The effects of female sex, viral genotype, and IL28B genotype on spontaneous clearance of acute hepatitis C virus infection Hepatology 59:(1).
- Maher et al. (2006). Incidence and risk factors for hepatitis C seroconversion in injecting drug users in Australia. Addiction. 101: 1499–1508

== Awards and recognition ==
Maher's awards are as follows:

- (2017) Fellow of the Australian Academy of Health and Medical Sciences (FAHMS).
- (2015) Member of the Order of Australia (AM).
- (2015) Fellow of the Academy of the Social Sciences in Australia.
- (2014-2018) Senior Research Fellowship, NHMRC.
- (2014) Member, Academy for the Social Sciences and Humanities in HIV (ASSHH)
- (2013) Prime Minister's Award for Excellence "Reducing the Harms of Drug Use in Australia and across the Asia/Pacific Region".
- (2004-2008) Career Development Award, NHMRC.
- (2003) Early Career Award, Academy of the Social Sciences in Australia.
- (1998) Cavan Young Scholar Award, American Society of Criminology.
