= Anushka Patel =

Cardiologist and scientific researcher

Professor Anushka Patel FAHMS
- Education: University of Queensland
- Scientific career
- Workplaces: Harvard University; University of Sydney; The George Institute for Global Health
- Thesis: Plasma lipid parameters, cardiovascular diseases and risk prediction, with particular reference to the Asia-Pacific region

Anushka Patel is and Australian cardiologist who is Chief Executive Officer at The George Institute for Global health, a Professor of Medicine at the University of New South Wales, and Cardiologist at the Royal Prince Alfred Hospital.

== Career ==
Patel completed her medical training at the University of Queensland, and then obtained a Master of Science in Epidemiology at Harvard University and a PhD from University of Sydney.

Patel's research is focused on improving cardiovascular care in the community and in acute care hospital settings. and she also leads research projects in Australia, China and India. She is supported by a Principal Research Fellowship from the Australian National Health and Medical Research Council (NHMRC).

She describes her motivations for treating those with heart disease, "Initially I was interested in how we could improve the treatment for people who are very sick with heart disease, such as those who have suffered a heart attack. However, as time went by, I became more interested in how you actually prevent this heart attack in the first place, because it is probably a lot more beneficial to the population if you can prevent it". Patel wrote an essay on "Making Asia fit for Growth" for the Asia Society in Australia.

== Publications ==
Patel has over 82,000 citations and an H-index of 43, as at July 2024, according to Google Scholar. Her publications focus on cardiology, and she has publications in various journals including The Lancet. Select publications include:

- Patel, A. (2007) Effects of a fixed combination of perindopril and indapamide on macrovascular and microvascular outcomes in patients with type 2 diabetes mellitus (the ADVANCE trial): a randomised controlled trial. The Lancet. V370:9590. P829-840.
- Maharani A, Sujarwoto, Praveen D, Oceandy D, Tampubolon G, et al. (2024) Implementation of mobile-health technology is associated with five-year survival among individuals in rural areas of Indonesia. PLOS Digital Health 3(4): e0000476. https://doi.org/10.1371/journal.pdig.0000476.
- Dewi, A., Pisani, E., Ihsan, B. R. P., Hariadini, A. L., Patel, A., Palagyi, A., ... Lyrawati, D. (2023). Continuity of CVD treatment during the COVID-19 pandemic: evidence from East Java, Indonesia. Journal of Pharmaceutical Policy and Practice, 16(1). https://doi.org/10.1186/s40545-022-00509-w.

== Awards and recognition ==
- 2018 — awarded Australian Academy of Science Gustav Nossal Medal for Global Health.
- 2015 — elected Fellow of the Australian Academy of Health and Medical Sciences.
- 2011 — named one of the 100 most influential people in Sydney by The Sydney Morning Herald.
- 2006 — received the Peter Bancroft Prize from the University of Sydney in 2006.
