= Maree Teesson =

Australian health professional

Maree Rose Teesson AC, FAAHMS, FASSA, is an Australian expert on mental health. She is the Director of The Matilda Centre for Research in Mental Health and Substance Use and NHMRC Principal Research Fellow at the University of Sydney. She is also professorial fellow at the Black Dog Institute, UNSW.

She is an elected Fellow of the Australian Academy of Health and Medical Sciences (FAAHMS), and an elected Fellow of the Academy of the Social Sciences in Australia (FASSA).

== Education and career ==
Teesson holds a BSc (Psychology)(Hons) and PhD (Psychiatry) from the University of New South Wales. Her 1995 PhD Thesis was "An evaluation of mental health service delivery in an inner city area".

She is the author of more than 280 publications, and her work has been cited more than 9,000 times.

In 2018, Teesson launched an innovative eHealth program along with Prof. Nicola Newton at the University of New South Wales to target the six main lifestyle risk factors among teenagers, including binge eating and unhealthy eating, to help prevent chronic disease.

== Awards and recognition ==
In recognition of her achievements in education, research and mentoring, Teesson received the 2013 UNSW Faculty of Medicine Dean's Award for Outstanding Achievement. Teesson went on to win the 2014 University of Technology, Sydney Eureka Prize for Outstanding Mentor of Young Researchers for her achievements in fostering and developing her teams, as well as reaching out to more than 20,000 Australian high-school students with online programs that focus on preventing alcohol and drug related harm.

In 2014, she was named by the Australian Financial Review as one of the "100 Women of Influence" in the Innovation category. In 2015 she was presented with the Society for Mental Health Research Oration Award for her rise to prominence within the Australian and New Zealand psychiatric research community.

On Australia Day 2018, she was appointed a Companion of the Order of Australia for eminent service to medicine, particularly to the prevention and treatment of substance use disorders, as a researcher and author, to innovative mental health policy development, to education, and as a role model for young researchers. Teesson has written extensively on mental health after lockdown.

She won the University of Sydney Eureka Prize for Leadership in Science in the 2026 Eureka Prizes.

== Selected publications ==
- Addictions, co-authored with Louisa Degenhardt and Wayne Hall, Hove, 2002, ISBN 1841693138; 2nd ed. Hove, East Sussex New York Psychology Press, 2012, ISBN 9780415582995
- Comorbid Mental Disorders and Substance Use Disorders : Epidemiology, Prevention and Treatment, co-edited with Heather Proudfoot, Dept. of Health and Ageing, 2003, ISBN 064282424X
- Proudfoot H, Teesson M, Australian National Survey of Mental Health and Wellbeing (October 2002). "Who seeks treatment for alcohol dependence? Findings from the Australian National Survey of Mental Health and Wellbeing". Soc Psychiatry Psychiatr Epidemiol. 37 (10): 451–6. doi:10.1007/s00127-002-0576-1. PMID 12242622. S2CID 33089344.
- Slade, Tim; Chapman, Cath; Swift, Wendy; Keyes, Katherine; Tonks, Zoe; Teesson, Maree (24 October 2016). "Birth cohort trends in the global epidemiology of alcohol use and alcohol-related harms in men and women: systematic review and metaregression". BMJ Open. 6 (10) e011827. doi:10.1136/bmjopen-2016-011827. PMC 5093369. PMID 27797998.
- Slade, T.; Johnston, A.; Teesson, M.; Whiteford, H.; Burgess, P.; Pirkis, J.; Saw, S (May 2009). "The Mental Health of Australians 2: Substance Use Disorders in Australia" (PDF). Department of Health and Ageing, Canberra.
