= Sharon Lewin =

Australian infectious disease physician and researcher

Professor Sharon Lewin AO FAA FRACP FAHMS
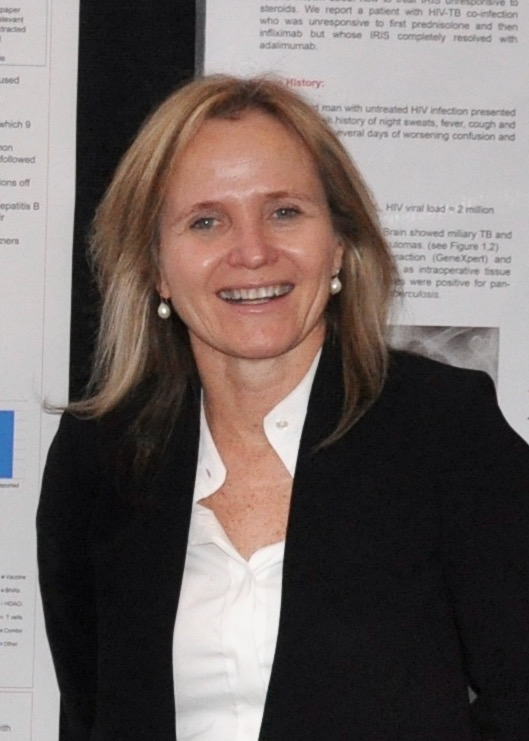
- Lewin in November 2017
- Born: Melbourne, Australia
- Education: Monash University
- Known for: HIV persistence and latency, HIV/HBV co-infection, COVID-19
- Spouse: Robert Milstein
- Awards: Peter Wills Medal (2015); Officer of the Order of Australia (2019); Robert C. Gallo Award for Scientific Excellence and Leadership in Medical Virology (2020); Medal for Outstanding Female Researcher (2022)
- Scientific career
- Fields: Medicine, immunology, V\virology
- Workplaces: The Peter Doherty Institute for Infection and Immunity, University of Melbourne and Royal Melbourne Hospital; Monash University, Department of Infectious Diseases; Alfred Hospital; Burnet Institute

Sharon Ruth Lewin is an Australian infectious diseases expert who is the inaugural Director of The Peter Doherty Institute for Infection and Immunity (Doherty Institute) and the Cumming Global Centre for Pandemic Therapeutics. She is also a Melbourne Laureate Professor of Medicine at The University of Melbourne, and the immediate past president of the International AIDS Society (IAS) (2022–2024).

== Research and accomplishments ==
Lewin began her research career just as an antiretroviral treatment emerged for people living with HIV. Drawn to study HIV because of its global challenge, along with the complex social issues, Lewin's research interests have developed from questions arising during the clinical care of people living with HIV. Detecting, quantifying and potentially reactivating latent HIV is a central theme of Lewin's research, which spans basic virology, cellular immunology and clinical research. Her research laboratory is run together with immunologist and clinician Paul Cameron.

While completing her postdoctoral training with David Ho at the Aaron Diamond AIDS Research Centre, Lewin developed a highly sensitive PCR method to detect unspliced HIV RNA, an early product of viral transcription, in people receiving antiretroviral drugs. Lewin's laboratory has developed models of HIV latency which are used to further tease out the mechanisms involved, and to assess the impact of latency reversal agents. Lewin's lab has shown that triggering the CCR7 receptor on resting CD4 T cells can induce latency, acting through the activation of the cellular cytoskeleton, particularly actin remodelling. This chemokine-induced latency model has been used in a comprehensive comparison of in vitro models for evaluating latency reversal agents. Lewin's laboratory has also described the role of myeloid dendritic cells and other antigen-presenting cells in establishing HIV latency.

Lewin's team have made contributions to the knowledge of the HIV reservoir during antiretroviral treatment. This includes studies of naive CD4 T cells, where longitudinal and cross-sectional studies have shown that both CD31+ and CD31- naive CD4 T cells contribute to the ongoing HIV reservoir and that HIV DNA is preferentially found in CD4 T cells expressing the chemokine receptors CXCR3 and CCR6. Lewin's group has also studied immune reconstitution after antiretroviral treatment begins, exposing some of the factors associated with faster reconstitution and has demonstrated a link between immune reconstitution and variants in the IL-7R gene.

Lewin's research has elucidated some of the basic immunology of Hepatitis B infection alone and in co-infection with HIV. Ongoing research is providing a deeper understanding of the clinical consequences of co-infection with Hepatitis B and HIV, both in Australian participants and through a long-standing collaboration with Thai researchers.

Lewin's clinical research efforts have focussed on potential HIV cure strategies, particularly those using the epigenetic modifiers including histone deacetylase inhibitors (HDACis). In vitro experiments showed that HDACis such as entinostat, metacept-1 and -3 could activate latent HIV in primary T cells. Following a sabbatical working with Christine Katlama and Brigitte Autran at the Hopital Pitié-Salpêtrière and Université Pierre et Marie Curie (UPMC), Paris, Lewin began to focus more on moving potential cure strategies into clinical trials. Lewin's lab conducted the first multi-dose proof-of-concept HDACi trial in HIV positive participants, administering vorinostat daily over a 14-day period and assessing safety and impact on HIV transcription and reservoirs. The trial and follow-on study showed that while vorinostat was safe and able to increase HIV transcription in most participants, it did not reduce the HIV reservoir. A dose-escalation study conducted in Melbourne, Australia and San Francisco, California, USA of the anti-alcohol compound Disulfiram also showed the ability to increase levels of cell-associated unspliced HIV RNA. Both vorinostat and Disulfiram are now being investigated as part of a combination approach to latency activation ('kick' or 'tickle') followed by a second intervention to remove cells harbouring reactivated virus ('kill' or 'tease').

Lewin gave the opening plenary at the International AIDS Conference in Vienna in 2010. Lewin was local co-chair for the International AIDS Conference (AIDS 2014) in Melbourne, a member of WHO and UNAIDS strategic advisory groups and lead co-author of the 2016 International AIDS Society global scientific strategy to achieve an HIV cure. Lewin is a founding council member of the Academy of Health and Medical Sciences, elected member of the Governing Council of the International AIDS Society representing the Asia Pacific region, she became President of the International AIDS Society in 2022 for a two-year tenure, member of the council of the National Health and Medical Research Council (NHMRC) of Australia and chairs the Health Translation Advisory Committee. She chairs the Ministerial Advisory Committee on Blood Borne Viruses and Sexually Transmitted Infections, the peak advisory group to the minister of health of Australia.

== Awards and honours ==
- Peter Wills Medal (2015)
- Officer of the Order of Australia (2019) "For distinguished service to medical research, and to education, in the field of infectious diseases, particularly HIV/AIDS."
- Victorian Honour Roll of Women (2019)
- Global Virus Network's (GVN) Robert C. Gallo Award for Scientific Excellence and Leadership in Medical Virology (2020)
- Melbourne Achiever Award (2020)
- 2020–21 Vocational Service Award (2021)
- Medal for Outstanding Female Researcher from the Australian Academy of Health and Medical Sciences (2022)
- Fellow of the Australian Academy of Science (2023)
- Honorary Doctor of Science from La Trobe University (2023)
- Honorary Doctor from University of Bonn (2025)
- The Royal Melbourne Hospital (RMH) Resarch Hall of Fame (2026)
