= The Croc Festival =

Annual event in Australia

The Croc Festival is an Australian event held annually in a number of locations in remote and rural areas and is produced by Indigenous Festivals of Australia. It engages Indigenous Australians and non-Indigenous Australians with the aim of building partnerships and celebrating youth and traditional culture. Over three fun days, primary and high school students participate in activities related to arts, education, health, careers, sports, health and reconciliation. In the evenings students stage non-competitive school dance performances under the stars.

== History ==
Croc Festival was created in 1998 after the former Queensland Minister for Health, Mike Horan, asked the producers of the Rock Eisteddfod Challenge to find a way to get more indigenous students to attend school.

The inaugural Croc Festival in Weipa, Far North Queensland in July 1998 attracted 350 students from 17 schools in Cape York and Torres Strait. It was opened by the Governor-General, William Deane, who observed that the event was "reconciliation in action". In 2007 Croc Festival is expected to attract almost 20,000 students from 450 schools with a national audience of about 60,000 people.

Croc Festival is 100% drug, alcohol and tobacco free. According to research and reports by teachers, outcomes for students include improved self-esteem and teamwork, improved tolerance of other students, awareness of personal health issues such as nutrition and mental health, and knowledge of the dangers of drugs, alcohol and tobacco. Further outcomes include increased rates of school attendance, improved literacy, numeracy and oratorical skills, and better goal setting for the future.

Croc Festival in 2007 will be held on Thursday Island in Queensland, Derby and Mullewa in Western Australia, Alice Springs in the Northern Territory, Port Augusta in South Australia, Kempsey and Dubbo in New South Wales, and Shepparton in Victoria. Students travel by road, air and sea to reach the venues, often camping in tents at Croc Village during the three-day festival.

The not-for-profit Croc Festival is supported by community businesses, local, state and federal government funding, corporate and philanthropic sponsorship, and in-kind support. Croc Festival and the Rock Eisteddfod Challenge are part of the Global Rock Challenge family which engages youth in seven countries around the world.

The Croc Festival was cancelled in 2008 due to a Federal funding cut.

== See also ==
- Rock Eisteddfod Challenge
