= C. Glenn Begley =

Australian hematologist and oncologist

C. Glenn Begley is a hematologist and oncologist who was the CEO of BioCurate, an Australia-based joint venture between the University of Melbourne and Monash University that was launched in 2016. The "C. Glenn Begley Award", created by Stanford University in 2025, was named in his honor. The award celebrates teams that uphold the highest standards of scientific integrity, fostering innovation that is both impactful and reliable.

Previously, he worked at the California-based biotech company Akriveia Therapeutics as their chief scientific officer. His other previous positions include global head of hematology and oncology research at Amgen, senior vice president and chief scientific officer at TetraLogic Pharmaceuticals, and executive director of the Western Australian Institute of Medical Research.

He studied medicine at the University of Melbourne. He is known for a study he co-authored in 2012 in which he found that only 6 out of 53 (11%) of landmark preclinical studies of cancer drugs could be reproduced. He was elected to the American Society for Clinical Investigation in 2000. Begley was elected Fellow of the Australian Academy of Health and Medical Sciences in 2015.

== Education ==
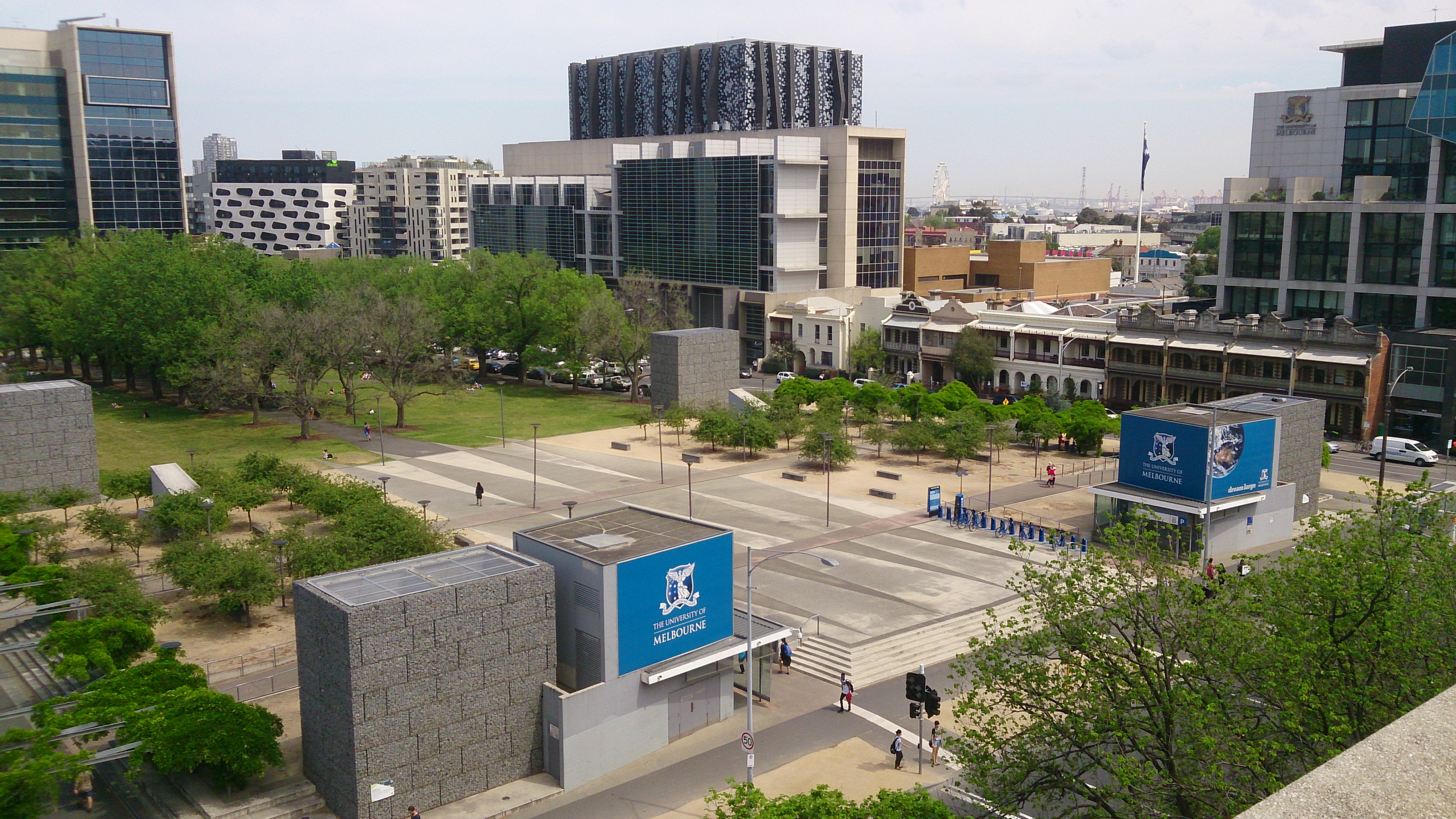
The University of Melbourne

Begley studied medicine at the University of Melbourne starting in 1972 and finishing in 1978. During this time, he completed his M.B., Ph.D.in cellular and molecular biology, and B.S.

== Accreditations, awards and honors ==
- Doctorate
- M.B.B.S, Bachelor of Medicine, Bachelor of Surgery
- F.R.A.C.P., Fellow of the Royal Australasian College of Physicians.
- F.R.C.P.A., Fellow of the Royal College of Pathologists of Australasia.
- F.R.C.Path., Fellow of the Royal College of Pathologists. (UK)
- F.A.H.M.S., Fellow of the Australian Academy of Health and Medical Sciences. Inducted 2015
- F.A.S.C.I., Fellow of the American Society for Clinical Investigation. He was the foreign fellow to be elected into this society. (2015)
- F.A.A.P.S., Fellow of the Association of American Physicians and Surgeons. He was the foreign fellow to be elected into this association.

== Career ==
In the 1980s Begley did an apprenticeship under Donald Metcalf who was a pioneer of hematology in Australia. This was at the Walter and Eliza Hall Institute of Medical Research, the oldest medical research institute in Australia. This was for 3 years while Begley was a PhD student. Begley worked at Amgen in California from 2002 to 2012. Amgen is a biotechnology company that scientific research into drug development strategies and then markets them. He was the vice president and global head of hematology/oncology research.

On 15 March 2012 C. Glenn Begley was announced as the senior vice president of research and development at TetraLogic Pharmaceuticals in Pennsylvania. He worked there from 2012 to 2016. During this time, he also worked as a Non-Executive director and senior clinical advisor at Oxford BioTherapeutics (2012–2017). Begley is currently the CEO of BioCurate. The aim of BioCurate is to recognize potential in biomedical research and then invest to accelerate the process of converting the research into medicine and therapies.

== Research ==
In the 1980s, Begley's research was mainly done with Don Metcalf. They were featured on several papers together. From the scientific articles released at that time that he was the Chief Author of, the research areas included colony-stimulating factors (CSF) and their relevance to white blood cells and the immune response in vitro. In 1985 Begley, Metcalf and N.A. Nicola published a paper centring on granulocyte colony-stimulating factor’s (GCSF) effect on differentiation of white blood cells. This paper found that GCSF was affected differently to other colony stimulating factors and the paper was cited 136 times. Begley published a paper in 1986 that has 182 cites involving injecting mice with Multipotential CSF (M-CSF) then comparing white blood cell count in control mice. The results showed that M-CSF increased the monocyte and neutrophil count by more than 200% and the eosinophil count by 1000%. This paper showed the importance of CSF in hematopoietic repopulation in living organisms. It was cited 225 times.

In the 1990s his articles were focused around genes and proteins. The main gene looked at was the SCL gene and how it links to cancer. Begley continued his work from the 80’s into colony-stimulating factors (specifically GCSF) and in 1992 was published in the Lancet. This paper had important work outlining how CSF increases platelet recovery after chemotherapy. He also researches the developing nervous system and the different roles that proteins, white blood cells and genes play. In 1999 he released an article which he was the co-author of that was solely on SCL and the relationship with T cells and T lymphocytes. This paper concluded with an “Unresolved Issues” section which provides unanswered questions about SCL leading to more potential research in the future for Begley.

In the 2000s his work on Thrombopoietin and a protein coded by this gene was released. This is a hormone that regulates platelet production. He also had his most cited paper in 2007 titled "Genome-wide association study identifies novel breast cancer susceptibility loci" with 2518 cites. Begley was also involved in more work with mice that found that bone marrow cells are not a contributor to endothelium of tumors. In 2006 Begley contributed to work on EpoR on another highly cited paper (262) in the field of hematology.

In the 2010s more reflective scientific articles were released by Begley that comment on how his career and experience has shaped his view today. They talk about how scientific integrity is essential for research, the challenges involved with oncology research and how to avoid making mistakes when researching and producing drugs. This aligns with his time at BioCurate and TetraLogical Pharmaceuticals where his work involved drug related ventures and investing in therapies.

== Other published work ==
In 2015 Begley published a tribute to Don Metcalf. Begley and Metcalf worked together for 15 years. Begley claims Metcalf was a "teacher, role model, mentor, colleague and friend" to him and that he had a resounding impact on his life. In this article Begley explains how Metcalf shaped his view of scientific integrity and how science should have a passing of knowledge from experienced scientists to newer ones.
