= Sophia Zoungas =

Australian endocrinologist

Professor Sophia Zoungas FAHMS
- Awards: Fellow of the Australian Academy of Health and Medical Sciences (2022); Keillon Award (2022)
- Scientific career
- Fields: Diabetes
- Institutions: Monash University; Alfred Health
- Thesis: Cardiovascular risk in chronic renal failure : impact of transplantation and folic acid therapy on outcome, artery structure and function (2006)

Sophia Zoungas is a clinical endocrinologist from Victoria, Australia. She is recognised for her work in the management of diabetes and its vascular complications and leads Australia's largest translational research program in diabetes care and benchmarking of diabetes services. Zoungas's research explores the link between diabetes, glucose levels and cardiovascular risks and has enabled people with diabetes to be prescribed medication that reduce their cardiovascular risk factors. Zoungas internationally recognized clinical studies revolve around the effects of blood pressure lowering in people with Type 2 diabetes. She is head of the School of Public Health and Preventative Medicine at Monash University and is the Professor of Diabetes, Vascular Health and Ageing and is also deputy director of Research at Alfred Health.

Zoungas speaks publicly on the advantages of being a practicing endocrinologist as well as a scientist.

She has served as vice-president (2014-16) and president (2016-18) of the Australian Diabetes Society She has also been chair of the National Association for Diabetes Centres in Australia.

In 2022 Zoungas was elected as a fellow of the Australian Academy of Health and Medical Sciences and in the same year was awarded the Kellion Award from the Australian Diabetes Society.

== Selected publications ==
Zoungas has more than 300 publications in peer-reviewed journals and is recognized as the most cited researcher in the field of diabetes.

- Aortic pulse wave velocity improves cardiovascular event prediction: an individual participant meta-analysis of prospective observational data from 17,635 subjects
- Severe hypoglycemia and risks of vascular events and death
- Albuminuria and kidney function independently predict cardiovascular and renal outcomes in diabetes
- Diabetes kidney research
- Clinical practice guideline for diabetes management in chronic kidney disease
- Follow-up of blood pressure lowering and glucose control in Type 2 diabetes
