= QIMR Berghofer =

Australian research institute

- Established: 1 November 1945; 80 years ago
- Mission: Medical research
- Focus: Cancer; Infectious diseases; Mental health; Chronic diseases
- Chair: Arun Sharma
- Director and CEO: Fabienne Mackay
- Staff: Approximately 1,000 (2025)
- Budget: ▲ A$126 million (2024)
- Formerly called: Queensland Institute of Medical Research
- Location: Herston Health Precinct, Brisbane, Australia
- Website: qimrb.edu.au

The QIMR Berghofer, formerly the Queensland Institute of Medical Research, is an Australian medical research institute and statutory authority located at the Herston Health Precinct in Brisbane, Queensland. The institute was established in 1945 by the Queensland Government, and governed by an independent Council. Originally intended to conduct research into tropical diseases in North Queensland, QIMR Berghofer now conducts research into cancers, infectious diseases, mental health, and chronic disorders. In 2021, the institute received the Queensland Greats Award for their contributions to medicine.

== History ==
QIMR was created by an act of the Queensland state parliament in 1945 from a report by Edward Derrick that recommended a permanent research facility to be set up to investigate diseases endemic to the climate of Queensland. QIMR began operations in 1947 with a staff of seven in a disused World War II US Army hut in Victoria Park, Brisbane. This temporary accommodation housed the institute for the next 30 years.

From 1951 to 1965, at a field station in North Queensland, QIMR researchers investigated outbreaks of leptospirosis, scrub typhus, dengue and other tropical fevers. Researchers also studied viruses in Queensland's animals.

In 1960, QIMR scientists isolated Murray Valley encephalitis virus from mosquitoes, which paved the way for discovery of other arboviruses like Ross River virus in 1963. During the 1960s, QIMR Berghofer established an oncology section to investigate cancer-causing viruses. One project researched cancer cells taken from Burkitt's lymphoma patients in Papua New Guinea, and found they were infected with Epstein-Barr virus (EBV). EBV is now known to cause many types of leukaemias and lymphomas. Eight years later, this same virus was found to immortalise white blood cells; a discovery that revolutionised research of these immune cells and their DNA.

In 1977, QIMR received a bequest of one a million dollars when Ettie Gwendoline Greenwood (1906–1977). The money was used to fund cancer research from what was named the Edith and Gordon Greenwood Medical Research Fund. In the same year QIMR relocated to new laboratories in the grounds of the Royal Brisbane and Women's Hospital at Herston.

In 1988, the Queensland Government amended the QIMR Act to make the institute a statutory authority. The premier at the time, Mike Ahern, secured $30 million to fund a new building for QIMR's increasing staff. The new building was officially opened in 1991, and was named the Bancroft Centre, as a memorial to the family who contributed to QIMR's early history.

In 1997, a donation of $20 million by property developer and philanthropist Clive Berghofer was matched by both the federal and state governments, and used to build the QIMR Cancer Research Centre.

In 2002, Q-Pharm Pty Limited became operational at the QIMR Cancer Research Centre. Q-Pharmis a Phase I clinical trials facility to test potential new therapeutic products on humans. It was owned by QIMR Berghofer until 2019. Also in 2002, a new Indigenous Health Research Program was initiated to focus on improving health outcomes for Aboriginal and Torres Strait Islander peoples and work in collaboration with Indigenous communities.

In August 2013, QIMR was renamed to QIMR Berghofer after Clive Berghofer donated a further $50.1 million to the institute. The donation is the largest philanthropic gifting in Australian history by any one individual.

== Research ==
The institute's research includes:

- Cancers, including leukaemia, skin, breast, prostate, pancreatic, oesophageal and colorectal cancers
- Infectious diseases such as HIV, malaria, group A streptococcus, Epstein-Barr virus, Ross River virus, scabies, dengue fever and schistosomiasis (blood flukes)
- Mental health, including schizophrenia, dementia and Alzheimer's disease
- Chronic disorders such as liver disease, asthma and haemochromatosis

== Location ==
The institute is located at the Herston Health Precinct, in the inner suburb of Herston in Brisbane, Australia. The precinct co-locates QIMR Berghofer, the Royal Brisbane and Women's Hospital, the Surgical, Treatment and Rehabilitation Service, and the University of Queensland Centre for Clinical Research. The Queensland University of Technology also maintains a healthcare research presence on the campus, as well as at its nearby Kelvin Grove campus. Various other public health organisations (such as Pathology Queensland and Genetic Health Queensland) and private companies (such as Stryker and Nucleus Network) are present on the campus or in the immediate area.

== Key people ==
=== Directors ===
Order	Incumbent	Start date	End date	Time in office	Notes
1	Ian Murray Mackerras	2 June 1947	1961	13–14 years	
2	Edward Derrick	1961	1966	13–14 years	
3	Ralph Doherty	1966	1978	11–12 years	
4	Chev Kidson	1978	1990	11–12 years	
5	Lawrie Powell	1990	2000	9–10 years	
6	Michael F. Good AO	2000	June 2010	9–10 years	
7	Frank Gannon	January 2011	January 2020	9 years	
8	Fabienne Mackay	May 2020	Incumbent		

=== Other key people ===
- Deputy Director: Grant Ramm
- Council Chair: Arun Sharma
- Patron: Paul de Jersey AC, Governor of Queensland

== Awards ==
In 2010, the Queensland Institute of Medical Research was inducted into the Queensland Business Leaders Hall of Fame.

In 2021, the institute was named as one of the Queensland Greats by the Queensland Government.

== See also ==
- Health in Australia
