= Louise Baur =

Australian paediatrician and childhood-obesity researcher

Professor Louise Baur AM FAHMS

Personal details
- Born: Coffs Harbour, New South Wales, Australia

Louise Baur is an Australian paediatrician with a research interest in childhood obesity. In 2015 she was appointed professor and head of Paediatrics and Child health (subsequently renamed Child and Adolescent Health) at the University of Sydney, and head of The Children's Hospital at Westmead Clinical School.

== Early life ==
Baur was born in Coffs Harbour, New South Wales, Australia where her father worked as a forester. Her family moved to Sydney and she went to school at Beecroft Public School and Cheltenham Girls High School. Baur completed her education at the University of Sydney, obtaining her BSc(Med) in 1979, her MBBS(Hons) in 1981 and her PhD in 1992.

== Career ==
Baur trained as a general paediatrician, largely at the Royal Alexandra Hospital for Children. She became a Fellow of the Royal Australasian College of Physicians (FRACP) in 1988. Her PhD studies (1989–1992) were undertaken at the hospital with Kevin Gaskin and Martin Silink. In 1994, Baur took up an appointment as senior lecturer in the then Department of Paediatrics and Child Health at the University of Sydney. She was promoted to professor in 2004.

Baur has held a position as consultant paediatrician at what is now The Children's Hospital at Westmead, in Sydney, since 1994. She established the first multidisciplinary paediatric obesity weight management service in Australasia, incorporating multidisciplinary clinics, individual therapist consultations, group programs, and a health professional training program. She was head of service from 2009 to 2014 and has made a significant contribution to research in paediatric obesity.

Baur is an National Health and Medical Research Council Leadership Fellow (Level 3) and is the director of the Boden Initiative, part of the Charles Perkins Centre at the University of Sydney. She is the director of the council's Centre of Research Excellence in the Early Prevention of Obesity in Childhood-Translate, funded since 2016.

Baur was made a Member of the Order of Australia (AM) in 2010 "for service to medicine, particularly in the field of paediatric obesity as a researcher and academic, and to the community through support for a range of children's charities". In 2014 Baur became a Founding Fellow of the Australian Academy of Health and Medical Sciences. She is a member of the academy's council. Baur was a director of World Vision Australia from 2007 to 2016 and has been a member of the Sydney Children's Hospitals Network Governing Board since 2010. Baur was founding editor-in-chief of the journal Pediatric Obesity from 2005 to 2010 and remains an associate editor. In 2022 she became a board member of the Menzies School of Health Research and President of the World Obesity Federation. In 2023 she became President of the Australian Academy of Health and Medical Sciences Baur was a member of the WHO Ad Hoc Working Group on Science and Evidence for Ending Childhood Obesity and is an associate director of the University of Sydney’s WHO Collaborating Centre in Physical Activity, Nutrition & Obesity. Baur was involved in the Lancet Commission on the Definition and Diagnostic Criteria of Clinical Obesity.
