= Cheltenham Girls High School =

Cheltenham Girls' High School

Location
- Cheltenham, New South Wales; Australia; 33°45′24″S 151°4′24″E

Information
- Type: Public, secondary, single-sex, day school
- Motto: Truth, Unity, Concord
- Established: 1957
- Principal: Suellen Lawrence
- Years offered: 7–12
- Enrolment: ~1,275 (2011)
- Campus: Suburban
- Colours: Maroon, pink and sky blue
- Website: cheltenham-h.schools.nsw.gov.au

Cheltenham Girls High School, is a public, comprehensive, high school for girls, located in Cheltenham, a suburb in the Northern Sydney region of Sydney, New South Wales, Australia.

Established in 1957 and operated by the New South Wales Department of Education, the school has a non-selective enrolment policy and currently caters for approximately 1,260 students from Years 7 to 12.

In the 2006 Higher School Certificate, the National Education Directory of Australia named Cheltenham Girls High School the sixth best performing school, and the best non-selective public school in Sydney's Hornsby region.

It is well known for its distinctive pink uniform. The school has recently celebrated its 60th anniversary.

== History ==
Cheltenham Girls High School was founded in 1957–1958 by Bessie Mitchell who also acted as the first Principal. The School is located on the former residential estate of the Vicars family, who had donated the land for the only purpose of building a school. A leadlight window from the original house is now situated in the administration foyer, as well as a larger window of a ship being located in the E block. The ship is used in the header of the school newsletter, Yarrabee

Cheltenham Girls High school, Quadrangle

The first students of the school were accommodated at Epping Boys' High School buildings during 1957, as the school was still in the process of being built. The Epping boys playground was separated, one side for the girls, one for the boys. The boys were caned if they were seen in the girl's playground. These students finally moved to new buildings on the Cheltenham site in 1958 and comprised four classes of second-year students and 10 classes of first-year students. A common myth associated with the school is that the colour of the uniform comes from a bequest, the terms of which stated that the uniform must be pink. In fact, it was not Bessie Mitchell as some think, who decided the uniforms should be pink dresses; it was the Vicars family who previously owned the land. These dresses are still worn today and are noted throughout the area.

One highlight of the Cheltenham school year is the annual Presentation Day, which is held at the Sydney Opera House each year. The majority of students, staff and parents travel to Circular Quay station in a special train reserved for this occasion (the "Cheltenham Express"). At this Presentation Day, students sing Handel's 'Hallelujah' chorus and a chosen other song (such as Pharrell Williams' 'Happy') as an ensemble. This performance requires several lessons' worth of time to practice as a school and has been conducted on Zoom meetings in recent years or through lipsyncing due to the COVID-19 pandemic.

== Curriculum ==
Cheltenham Girls' High School is registered and accredited with the New South Wales Board of Studies, and therefore follows the mandated curriculum for all years. The school provides two years of compulsory subjects (Years 7–8); two years of compulsory subjects, plus three elective subjects for the School Certificate (Years 9–10); and two years preparing for the Higher School Certificate (HSC) (Years 11–12). In Years 11 and 12, a minimum of 12 units Preliminary and 10 units HSC must be studied, with English the only mandatory subject. The school also offers two accelerated course for selected students, the subject are IPT, and Aboriginal Studies. Additional courses are also available through TAFE NSW, the Open High School, Saturday School of Community Languages and other providers.

The school is a comprehensive high school, and typically performs well in the HSC, outperforming some public selective schools. In the 2006 HSC, the National Education Directory of Australia named Cheltenham Girls the sixth best performing school, and the best non-selective public school in Sydney's Hornsby region.

== House system ==
Students are divided alphabetically into six house groups. School carnivals in swimming athletics and cross country are organised on a house basis. There are also sport prefects mostly from the senior years, but a few from the juniors in each sport house that lead the houses into house and school spirit chants and organise house meetings and do various jobs. The houses are:

- Bookoola (light blue) – "Wise Owl"
- Mirrabooka (dark blue) – "Southern Cross"
- Coolaroo (yellow) – "Stars"
- Petarli (white and black) – "The Moon"
- Dulkara (red) – "Rainbow"
- Wirreanda (green) – "Tall Trees"

In the earlier days of the school, there were only two houses in the colours of green and a darker green.

== Notable alumnae ==
- Louise Baur, paediatrician
- Beverley Dunn, set decorator, Oscar Award 2014 for The Great Gatsby
- Kylie Kwong, celebrity chef
- Meredith Oakes, playwright and music critic
- Christine Piper, writer, Winner of the Australian/Vogel Literary Award for her novel After Darkness.
- Lily Serna, mathematician and TV presenter, formerly co-host of SBS Television's Letters and Numbers
- Jenny Tian, comedian

== See also ==
- List of government schools in New South Wales
