= Robin Turner (statistician) =

New Zealand professor of biostatistics

Academic background
- Education: University of Canterbury
- Thesis: Independent component analysis of personality and symptoms of depression and statistical parametric mapping of personality and brain function (2004)
- Doctoral advisor: Irene Hudson

Robin Maree Turner (born 1976) is a New Zealand statistician, and is a full professor at the University of Otago, specialising in applying biostatistics to health-related research. She is the director of the Biostatistics Centre in the School of Medicine.

== Academic career ==
Having wanted to be an astronaut as a child, and then turning her attention to astronomy, Turner initially studied physics, astronomy and mathematics at the University of Canterbury. Turner then completed a PhD titled Independent component analysis of personality and symptoms of depression and statistical parametric mapping of personality and brain function also at Canterbury. Her research was supervised by Irene Hudson. After living in Australia for twelve years, where she worked at the University of Sydney, and the University of New South Wales, Turner then returned to New Zealand to join the faculty of the University of Otago in 2017. She was promoted to full professor in 2022. She is the inaugural Director of the Otago School of Medicine Biostatistics Centre.

Turner's research focuses on applying biostatistical methods to health-related research. She works across a variety of health-related areas, including epidemiology of respiratory viruses, risk factors for chronic disease, and how to improve the follow-up and monitoring of cancer patients. She has also worked on methods for designing clinical trails to allow the effect of patient treatment preferences to be assessed, and is interested in investigating the accuracy of diagnostic tests.

== Personal life ==
Turner is a keen bagpiper.

== Selected works ==
- Meagan Brennan; Robin M Turner; Stefano Ciatto; M Luke Marinovich; James R French; Macaskill, Petra; Nehmat Houssami (2011). "Ductal carcinoma in situ at core-needle biopsy: meta-analysis of underestimation and predictors of invasive breast cancer". Radiology. 260 (1): 119–128. doi:10.1148/radiol.11102368. PMID 21493791. Wikidata Q57614537.
- Nehmat Houssami; Stefano Ciatto; Robin M Turner; Hiram S Cody; Petra Macaskill (2011). "Preoperative ultrasound-guided needle biopsy of axillary nodes in invasive breast cancer: meta-analysis of its accuracy and utility in staging the axilla". Annals of Surgery. 254 (2): 243–251. doi:10.1097/sla.0b013e31821f1564. PMID 21597359. Wikidata Q37877498.
- M Cardona-Morrell; Jch Kim; R M Turner; M Anstey; I A Mitchell; K Hillman (2016). "Non-beneficial treatments in hospital at the end of life: a systematic review on extent of the problem". International Journal for Quality in Health Care. 28 (4): 456–469. doi:10.1093/intqhc/mzw060. PMID 27353273. Wikidata Q36063539.
- Nehmat Houssami; Robin Turner; Morrow, Monica (2013). "Preoperative magnetic resonance imaging in breast cancer: meta-analysis of surgical outcomes". Annals of Surgery. 257 (2): 249–255. doi:10.1097/sla.0b013e31827a8d17. PMID 23187751. Wikidata Q43915022.
- Jesse Jansen; Vasikaran Naganathan; Stacy M Carter; McLachlan, Andrew; Nickel, Brooke; Les Irwig; Bonner, Carissa; Doust, Jenny; Jim Colvin; Aine Heaney; Robin Turner; Kirsten McCaffery (2016). "Too much medicine in older people? Deprescribing through shared decision making". The BMJ. 353 i2893. doi:10.1136/bmj.i2893. PMID 27260319. Wikidata Q47732937.
- Philip Masson; Webster, Angela Claire; Martin Hong; Robin Turner; Lindley, Richard; Craig, Jonathan (2015). "Chronic kidney disease and the risk of stroke: a systematic review and meta-analysis". Nephrology Dialysis Transplantation. 30 (7): 1162–1169. doi:10.1093/ndt/gfv009. PMID 25681099. Wikidata Q38355231.
- Gabrielle J Williams; Macaskill, Petra; Siew F Chan; Robin M Turner; Elisabeth Hodson; Craig, Jonathan (2010). "Absolute and relative accuracy of rapid urine tests for urinary tract infection in children: a meta-analysis". Lancet Infectious Diseases. 10 (4): 240–250. doi:10.1016/s1473-3099(10)70031-1. PMID 20334847. Wikidata Q37718316.
- Byatt, David; Dalrymple, Michelle; R.M. Turner (2004). "Searching for primes in the digits of π". Computers and Mathematics with Applications. 48 (3–4): 497–504. doi:10.1016/j.camwa.2003.12.007. hdl:10092/11467. Zbl 1101.11052. Wikidata Q125756312.
