= Wayne Denis Hall =

- Born: 1951 (age 74–75)
- Education: University of New South Wales
- Awards: Fellow of the Academy of the Social Sciences in Australia, awarded a National Health and Medical Research Council fellowship in 2009, made Fellow Academy of Health and Medical sciences, 2015.
- Scientific career
- Fields: Psychology, behavioral science
- Workplaces: University of Queensland
- Thesis: Psychological processes in pain perception : the prospects of a signal detection theory analysis (1977)

Wayne Denis Hall (AM) is an Emeritus Professor at the National Centre for Research on Youth Substance Use Research. He was Inaugural Professor and Director of the Centre for Youth Substance Abuse Research at the University of Queensland (2013-2016), an NHMRC Australia Fellow at the University of Queensland Centre for Clinical Research (2010-2013), Professor of Public Health Policy in the School of Population Health (2005–2010) and Director of the Office of Public Policy and Ethics at Institute for Molecular Biosciences (2001–2005), at the University of Queensland. He is also a Fellow of the Academy of the Social Sciences in Australia. He has written widely on the ethical and policy issues associated with the genetics and neurobiology of addiction, mental disorders and cancer.

Wayne Hall was the Director of the National Drug and Alcohol Research Centre at the University of NSW during 1994 to 2001. Since 1993, Wayne Hall has made large contribution in the field of public health in the area of drug use, addiction, treatment, ethics, and research as World Health Organization's expert adviser. As a "Highly Cited Author" identified by the Institute for Scientific Analysis, he is dedicated to public health research with other authors such as Lucke J, Degenhardt L, Chapman S, and Gartner C. Professor Wayne Hall is currently working as a NHMRC Australia Fellow on addiction neuroethics (see www.addiction-neuroethics.com) and his research interests include alcohol and drug research and education, cancer prevention, epidemiology, health policy, mental health, pharmacoeconomics and policy, and tobacco control.

In 2014 Hall published a review that examined the adverse effects of cannabis. This review included studies from the previous 20 years. He concluded that driving while cannabis-impaired approximately doubles the risk of a car crash. He also concluded that when used regularly in adolescence the risk of school-leaving and "of cognitive impairment and psychoses in adulthood" was doubled. The review reported that about 1 in 11 (9%) of regular marijuana users develop dependence. Hall told LiveScience that "The perception that cannabis is a safe drug is a mistaken reaction to a past history of exaggeration of its health risks."

Hall was elected Fellow of the Australian Academy of Health and Medical Sciences (FAHMS) in 2015.
