= Samuel Berkovic =

Australian neurologist

Samuel Berkovic AC, FAA, FRACP, FRS
- Born: 13 October 1953 (age 72)
- Scientific career
- Fields: Neurology
- Institutions: University of Melbourne
- Thesis: Clinical and experimental aspects of complex partial seizures (1984)
- Website: www.brain.org.au/epilepsyresearch/staff/profiles/s_berkovic.htm

Samuel Frank Berkovic (born 1953) is an Australian neurologist and Laureate Professor in the Department of Medicine, University of Melbourne and Director of the Epilepsy Research Centre at Austin Health.

== Education ==
He earned a Bachelor of Medicine, Bachelor of Surgery and B.MedSci from the University of Melbourne in 1977, and an M.D. from University of Melbourne, in 1985.

== Research and career ==
His research interest is in epilepsy genetics.

== Awards and honours ==
He is a Fellow of the Royal Australasian College of Physicians.

On 13 June 2005, Berkovic was appointed a Member of the Order of Australia (AO) for service to medicine as a neurologist, particularly in the field of epilepsy research and treatment.

In 2005 he won the Zülch Prize of the Max Planck Society.

Also in 2005, he was elected a Fellow of the Australian Academy of Science.

In 2007 he was elected a Fellow of the Royal Society.

On 26 January 2014, he was appointed a Companion of the Order of Australia (AC) for eminent service to biomedical research in the field of epilepsy genetics as a leading academic and clinician, to the study of neurology on a national and international level, and as an ambassador for Australian medical science education.

In 2015 he was elected a Fellow of the Australian Academy of Health and Medical Sciences

Prof. Berkovic is the recipient of 37th TS Srinivasan Endowment Oration Award 2017 and the keynote speaker at the TS Srinivasan - NIMHANS Knowledge Conclave 2017. He was also elected a Member of the National Academy of Medicine in 2017.
