= Keryn Williams =

Australian medical scientist (born 1949)

Professor Keryn Williams AC FAHMS

Personal details
- Born: Keryn Anne Williams; 5 September 1949 (age 76)

Keryn Anne Williams is an Australian medical scientist who works in the field of ophthalmology. She was a Principal Research Fellow in the School of Medicine at Flinders University. Her research interests include clinical and experimental corneal transplantation, ocular inflammation, ocular immunology and eye banking.

== Early life and education ==
Williams was born 5 September 1949. She graduated from the University of Melbourne with a Bachelor of Science with first class honours in 1971. In 1974, she completed her doctoral thesis, Immunochemical studies of human cell surface antigens, and flew to Britain on the day she submitted it. In England, she worked as a researcher at the University of Oxford with the Australian surgeon Peter Morris. Morris recommended her to his acquaintance Doug Coster, the first professor of ophthalmology at Flinders University, who hired her to work there as a research fellow in 1981. She retired in 2016 but has maintained several fellowships and memberships with various organisations.

== Honours and achievements ==
Williams has had several notable achievements throughout her career.

She founded the Australian Corneal Graft Registry (ACGR) in 1985 and is currently the scientific director of the registry.

The registry is a database that collects information on human corneal transplants from Australian-based eye banks to improve patient outcomes and clinical practice. The ACGR has collated information from more than 35,000 corneal graft procedures since its inception. The registry has been used as a model in several other countries when initiating their own corneal registries, and the extensive data being used in comparative studies globally.

The report released by the ACGR in 2018 outlines a newer form of keratoplasty, known as Descemet's Membrane Endothelial Keratoplasty which can reduce the occurrence of graft failure and reduce the timeframe to restoring vision outcomes.

Williams has provided expert commentary in the past on ophthalmological advances internationally, particularly on research suggesting that transplants may require gender separation, stating that "In Australia, we do not see—have never seen—an influence of gender matching or mismatching on corneal graft outcome,” indicating that this finding could be contributed to by the methodology used in the United Kingdom to match donors and patients.

In 2017, Williams was appointed a Companion of the Order of Australia (AC) for "eminent service to medical science in the field of ophthalmology through the research and development of corneal transplantation, as an academic and mentor, and as a supporter of young women scientists".

Williams is currently an honorary Senior Principal Research Fellow with the South Australian Health & Medical Research Institute, an Elected Fellow with the Australian Academy Health & Medical Sciences since 2016, an Honorary Fellow with the Royal Australian and New Zealand College of Ophthalmologists, and an Honorary Life Membership of the Transplantation Society of Australia and New Zealand.

Other achievements include:

- 1982 Co-founder of the Eye Bank of South Australia.
- 2011 Professor, School of Medicine, Flinders University of South Australia.
- 2012 NHMRC "Ten of the Best".

== Publications and patents ==
Williams has 168 publications between 1977 and 2019. Her research focuses on gene therapy of donor corneas to self produce proteins that assist in reducing transplant rejection in animal models. She is also involved in anti-rejection drug development focusing on delivery of the genetically modified antibodies via eyedrops or a porous silicon biomaterial.

Selected publications include:

- Williams, Keryn A.; Irani, Yazad D. (2016). "Gene Therapy and Gene Editing for the Corneal Dystrophies". Asia-Pacific Journal of Ophthalmology. 5 (4): 312–316. doi:10.1097/apo.0000000000000215. ISSN 2162-0989.
- Williams, K A (1 May 2005). "Corneal graft rejection occurs despite Fas ligand expression and apoptosis of infiltrating cells". British Journal of Ophthalmology. 89 (5): 632–638. doi:10.1136/bjo.2003.040675. ISSN 0007-1161.
- Williams, K. A.; Johnstone, E. W.; White, M. A.; Wong, H. C.; Coster, D. J. (1989-10). "Experimental fragmentary retinal transplantation in the rat". Transplantation Proceedings. 21 (5): 3773–3774. ISSN 0041-1345. PMID 2815275
- Williams, K. A.; Brereton, H. M.; Farrall, A.; Standfield, S. D.; Taylor, S. D.; Kirk, L. A.; Coster, D. J. (2005-08). "Topically applied antibody fragments penetrate into the back of the rabbit eye". Eye. 19 (8): 910–913. doi:10.1038/sj.eye.6701669. ISSN 1476-5454.
- Coster, D J; Williams, K A (2003-11). "Management of high-risk corneal grafts". Eye. 17 (8): 996–1002. doi:10.1038/sj.eye.6700634. ISSN 0950-222X.
- Keane, Miriam; Williams, Keryn; Coster, Douglas (14 March 2012), "Penetrating keratoplasty versus deep anterior lamellar keratoplasty for treating keratoconus", Cochrane Database of Systematic Reviews, Chichester, UK: John Wiley & Sons, Ltd, retrieved 7 April 2022

A comprehensive list of her work can be found at:

- "Keryn Williams". SAHMRI.

Williams has also filed for several patents, a full list can be found at:

- "Patents by Inventor Keryn Anne Williams". patents.justia.com.
