= Joanna Groom =

Australian Immunologist

Dr. Joanna Groom is an Australian Immunologist and Laboratory Head in the Immunology Division at the Walter and Eliza Hall Institute and WEHI CSL Centenary fellow. Her research focuses on how the communication and positioning of immune cells influences the immune response using 3D imaging methods with transcriptional analysis.

== Education and early career ==
Groom studied at Melbourne University (BSc Hons) and at Charles Sturt University (BSc AppSci). She completed her PhD at Garvan Institute and University of NSW followed by a postdoctoral fellowship at Harvard/Massachusetts General Hospital. During that time in Massachusetts, Groom found that chemokine regulation was not only critical for T cell positioning but also unintuitively for T cell priming.

Groom returned to Australia as a Laboratory Head in the Immunology division at the Walter and Eliza Hall Institute and WEHI CSL Centenary. Groom's work combines in vivo and 3D imaging methods with transcriptional analysis to discover how cellular interactions lead to tailored defense against diverse pathogenic infections.

== Fellowships ==
2014 Australian Research Council Future Fellow
