= Jonathan Carapetis =

Australian paediatric physician (born 1961)

Professor Jonathan Carapetis FAA FAHMS

Personal details
- Born: 1961 (age 64–65) Port Pirie, South Australia
- Education: University of Melbourne
- Occupation: Paediatrician

Jonathan Carapetis (born 1961) is an Australian paediatric physician with particular expertise in infectious disease and Indigenous child health. He is a Winthrop Professor at the University of Western Australia, an infectious diseases consultant at Princess Margaret Hospital for Children, and an Honorary Distinguished Research Fellow of the Walter and Eliza Hall Institute of Medical Research. Carapetis is the Director of the Telethon Kids Institute in Perth, Western Australia.

He is a medical practitioner, specialist paediatric physician, infectious diseases physician, and a public health physician.

== Early life and background ==
Carapetis was born in Port Pirie, South Australia. He moved to Washington DC in the mid-1970s, where he lived for four years while his father worked as a civil engineer for the World Bank in Africa. It was during frequent visits to Africa to see his father that Carapetis developed an awareness and understanding of other cultures and governments.

The majority of his high school years were spent at an International school in the US completing the International Baccalaureate before he returned to Australia to study medicine at the University of Melbourne. He spent many of his university holidays flying back to Africa to spend time with his father and it was in Tanzania where he conducted his university related practical medical elective, immersing himself in a local community near Mount Kilimanjaro. It was here Carapetis developed an interest in child health and saw first-hand the challenges facing families struggling with poverty and with major health crises such as the onset of HIV, malaria, pneumonia and malnutrition.

== Career ==
Carapetis undertook his internship and initial postgraduate medical training at the Royal Melbourne Hospital and at the Royal Children’s Hospital, Melbourne between 1987 and 1992 (interspersed with a year of traveling in 1990). He then worked as Chief Resident and Fellow in Infectious Diseases at the Royal Children's Hospital in Melbourne, as part of his specialisation training in paediatrics.

In 1994 he conducted doctoral studies at the Menzies School of Health Research, Charles Darwin University, into group A streptococcal diseases in the Aboriginal population. This work translated into important public health interventions, including the establishment of Australia's first rheumatic heart disease control program in the north of Australia. He also worked as a paediatrician at Royal Darwin Hospital.

Carapetis was awarded a PhD by the University of Sydney for his thesis: Ending the heartache; the epidemiology and control of acute rheumatic fever and rheumatic heart disease in the Top End of the Northern Territory. After a year spent working overseas as a Paediatric Infectious Diseases Fellow in Canada, Carapetis returned to Australia in 1999 where he was instrumental in setting up the Centre for International Child Health at the University of Melbourne. There he spent a lot of his time focusing on child health in developing countries and led some ground-breaking work in the development of affordable and effective vaccines to help children in both Fiji and Vietnam.

During this time in Melbourne Carapetis was also a Theme Director at the Murdoch Children's Research Institute and Consultant in Paediatric Infectious Diseases at Royal Children’s Hospital. In 2006 returned to Darwin where he had spent time in the mid-1990s to further his work in child health research with a particular focus on indigenous health. He held the position of Director of the Menzies School of Health Research from 2006 until June 2012. During the six years that Carapetis headed Menzies, funding was boosted by A$20 million per annum, the school more than doubled in size, and Menzies developed a reputation as Australia’s leading research institute into Aboriginal and tropical health.

In July 2012 Carapetis was appointed the Director of the Telethon Kids Institute. He also is a Winthrop Professor at the University of Western Australia and an infectious diseases consultant at the Perth Children's Hospital (formerly known as Princess Margaret Hospital for Children).

== Awards, honours and other recognition ==
In 2013, Carapetis was awarded Honorary Doctor of Science, Charles Darwin University, Northern Territory. In 2008 Carapetis was named the Northern Territory Australian of the Year and was selected as one of Australia’s 100 Smartest people (one of the Top Ten in Medicine and Health) in The Bulletin magazine "Smart 100" list. In 2006, he was selected as one of Australia’s Top Ten Scientific Minds aged under 45 years by Cosmos Magazine. Carapetis has written numerous textbook chapters on rheumatic fever, has been an invited speaker at more than 40 national and international conferences, and has over 150 peer reviewed publications. Carapetis' wide range of research interests includes group A streptococcal and pneumococcal diseases, other vaccine preventable diseases, vitamin D deficiency in refugees, and urinary tract infections in children.

Carapetis is an Honorary Professorial Fellow, Faculty of Engineering, Health Science and Environment, Charles Darwin University; a Professor, University of Queensland; an Honorary Distinguished Research Fellow, Menzies School of Health Research; an Honorary Fellow, Murdoch Children’s Research Institute; and an Honorary Distinguished Research Fellow of the Walter and Eliza Hall Institute of Medical Research. He became a Fellow of the Australian Academy of Health and Medical Sciences in 2015, while in 2022 he was elected Fellow of the Australian Academy of Science.

== Personal life ==
Carapetis is married to paediatrician and epidemiologist Associate Professor Sue Skull. They have two children.
