= Donald Nutbeam =

British-Australian scientist (born 1955)

Donald Nutbeam AO, FFPH, FAAHMS
- Born: May 18, 1955 (age 71); England
- Occupations: Public health scientist, academic
- Title: Executive Director of Sydney Health Partners
- Spouse: Sarah Anne Choules
- Children: Aimee Louise Nutbeam (born 1983), Benjamin Jordan Nutbeam (born 1986)
- Awards: Officer of the Order of Australia (AO), 2024; Fellow of the Faculty of Public Health, Royal Colleges of Physicians, 2003; Fellow of the Australian Academy of Health and Medical Sciences, 2018

Academic background
- Education: BEd (1978), MA (1983), PhD (1988)
- Alma mater: University of Southampton

Academic work
- Institutions: Sydney Health Partners (Executive Director); University of Sydney (Professor of Public Health); University of Southampton (Vice-Chancellor and President, 2009–2015)
- Notable works: Contributions to public health research, health literacy

Donald Nutbeam AO FFPH FAAHMS, also known as Don Nutbeam, is a British-Australian public health scientist and academic known for his work on health promotion and public health policy. Nutbeam serves as executive director of Sydney Health Partners and professor of public health at the University of Sydney. He has held significant leadership roles, including vice-chancellor and president of the University of Southampton, where he oversaw major institutional reforms and received the Queen’s Anniversary Prize for Higher Education on behalf of the university. Nutbeam has been particularly influential in advancing research on social determinants of health, health literacy, and public health interventions. He has been the editor-in-chief of Public Health Research and Practice since 2016.

== Early life and education ==
Born in post-war England as the youngest of five children to a Portsmouth dock worker, Nutbeam grew up in challenging socioeconomic conditions, experiencing firsthand the impact of social conditions on health. Talking about his early years, Nutbeam said that these formative experiences shaped his understanding of the relationships between individual behaviors, social contexts, and health outcomes, themes that have underpinned his career. He holds an MA and Ph.D. in health education from the University of Southampton.

== Career ==
Nutbeam's career spans extensive experience across academia, government, and public health leadership. After completing a PhD at the University of Southampton, he held various roles in the NHS and served as Head of Research for the Welsh Heart Program (1985–1988) before becoming chief of research and policy development at the Health Promotion Authority for Wales. In 1990, he transitioned to academia, joining the University of Sydney as a professor of public health. During his tenure, he held leadership positions including head of the School of Public Health and associate dean of the Faculty of Medicine. From 2000 to 2003, Nutbeam served as head of public health at the UK Department of Health, where he developed a cross-government strategy to address health inequalities.

In 2003, Nutbeam returned to the University of Sydney as pro vice-chancellor (health sciences), later becoming provost and deputy vice-chancellor (2006–2009). Between 2009 and 2015, he was vice-chancellor and president of the University of Southampton, implementing institutional reforms, receiving the Queen’s Anniversary Prize for Higher Education on behalf of the university. Since 2016, Nutbeam has held the position of professor of public health at the University of Sydney and served as principal senior advisor at the Sax Institute from 2016 to 2020.

Nutbeam's contributions in Australia in the 1990's included significant policy formulation on HIV/AIDS, youth health, and Aboriginal health education, alongside advising the Chinese government on non-communicable diseases prevention. In 1993, Nutbeam also led the revision of Australia's national health goals, which involved complex technical analysis and negotiations between state and federal governments. Nutbeam helped establishing Sydney's first postgraduate public health course for Indigenous students. (Note: The program achieved an 85% retention rate.) His early career work focused on youth health, and the importance of these formative years in shaping lifelong behaviors and values. He has advocated for innovative approaches to complex public health challenges, praising Australia’s capacity to think "broadly and laterally about how to solve really difficult public health problems".

On returning to Australia in 2016, Nutbeam made a major contribution to the development of Australia’s National Preventive Health Strategy in his role as a principal senior advisor to the Sax Institute, and is currently chair of the research advisory committee of Suicide Prevention Australia that oversees Australia’s $15m Suicide Prevention Research Fund, as well as being a board member of Suicide Prevention Australia.

As the executive director of Sydney Health Partners (SHP) since 2020, Nutbeam's focus has been on strengthening collaboration between healthcare institutions, universities, and research organizations to accelerate the translation of medical research into clinical practice. Under his leadership, SHP has advanced initiatives to address critical challenges in workforce retention, translational research, and innovation adoption within healthcare. Nutbeam’s efforts have emphasized the importance of sector-wide collaboration, targeted funding, and capacity building to improve patient outcomes and sustain Australia’s position as a global leader in healthcare innovation.

As of 2024, Nutbeam is a professor of public health at the University of Sydney, where he is engaged in projects to enhance health literacy in healthcare systems. His work with the New South Wales Health Literacy Hub focuses on fostering health-literate organizations and improving communication within healthcare systems to achieve better patient outcomes and cost efficiencies.

=== The University of Southampton ===
During his tenure as vice-chancellor of the University of Southampton, Nutbeam oversaw the development of the university’s Boldrewood Innovation Campus securing major investments from strategic partners Lloyds Register and the UK government to create a unique base for its engineering research and teaching. A major part of the facility was opened by HRH Princess Anne in 2015. Under Nutbeam's leadership, the university received the Queen’s Anniversary Prize for Higher and Further Education in February 2012, recognizing four decades of innovation and world-leading expertise in performance sports engineering. The award highlighted the university's contributions to supporting elite athletes, including Olympians such as Sir Chris Hoy and Amy Williams, through research in fields like fluid dynamics, structural engineering, and simulation technologies. Nutbeam lauded the accolade as a testament to Southampton's global impact in engineering and its collaboration with UK Sport to advance British athletic performance.

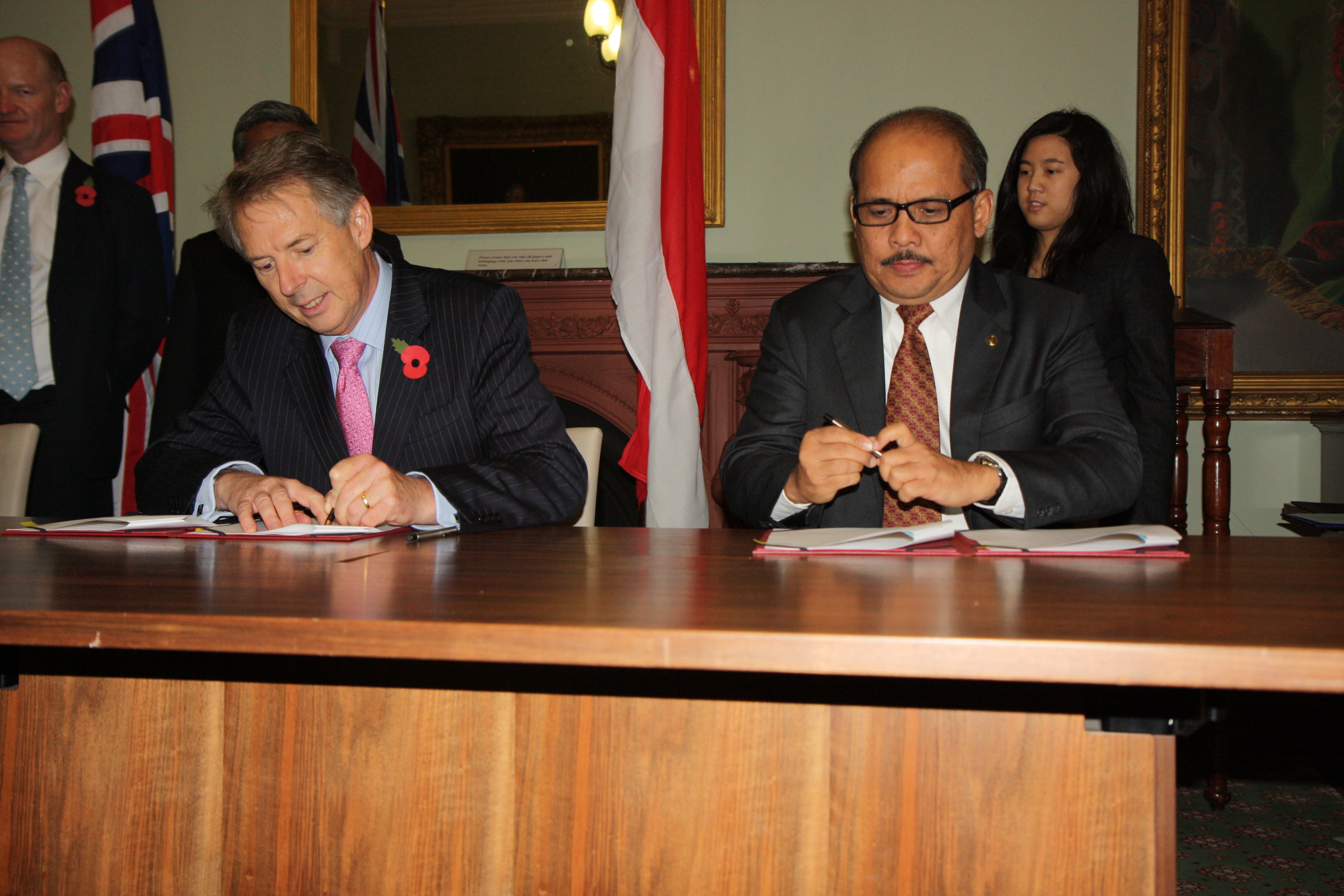
Nutbeam (then vice-chancellor at the University of Southampton) and Professor Tri Yogi Yuwono, Rector of the Institut Teknologi Sepuluh Nopember (November, 2012)

=== Research and contributions ===
Nutbeam’s professional achievements include his role in developing the Ottawa Charter for Health Promotion in the 1980s, a landmark framework emphasizing the integration of education, environmental change, and community development in public health strategies. His influential 2000 paper, Health Literacy as a Public Health Goal, has become a foundational work in the field, connecting health literacy to empowerment and the social determinants of health. Despite initial neglect, it gained significant recognition years later and has been widely cited.

== Selected publications ==
=== Articles ===
- Nutbeam, Don. "Evaluating health promotion—progress, problems and solutions." Health promotion international 13, no. 1 (1998): 27-44. doi:10.1093/heapro/13.1.27
- Nutbeam, Don, and Ilona Kickbusch. "Health promotion glossary." Health promotion international 13, no. 4 (1998): 349-364. JSTOR 45152457
- Nutbeam, Don. "Health literacy as a public health goal: a challenge for contemporary health education and communication strategies into the 21st century." Health promotion international 15, no. 3 (2000): 259-267. doi:10.1093/heapro/15.3.259
- Nutbeam, Don. "The evolving concept of health literacy." Social science & medicine 67, no. 12 (2008): 2072-2078. doi:10.1016/j.socscimed.2008.09.050
- Nutbeam, Don, Bronwyn McGill, and Pav Premkumar. "Improving health literacy in community populations: a review of progress." Health promotion international 33, no. 5 (2018): 901-911. doi:10.1093/heapro/dax015
- Nutbeam, Don, and Jane E. Lloyd. "Understanding and responding to health literacy as a social determinant of health." Annu Rev Public Health 42, no. 1 (2021): 159-73. doi:10.1146/annurev-publhealth-090419-102529

=== Selected books ===
- Nutbeam, Don, Elizabeth Harris, and M. Wise. Theory in a nutshell: a practical guide to health promotion theories. (4th Edition) McGraw-Hill, Australia, 2022.
- Bauman, Adrian, and Nutbeam, Don. (3rd Edition) Evaluation in a nutshell: a practical guide to the evaluation of health promotion programs.
- Nutbeam, Don, Muscat Danielle. Health Literacy in a Nutshell: A practical guide to health communication. McGraw-Hill, Australia, 2023.

== Awards and honours ==
Year	Award/Honour	Awarding Body
2024	Officer of the Order of Australia (AO)	Government of Australia
2018	Fellow of the Australian Academy of Health and Medical Sciences (FAAHMS)	Australian Academy of Health and Medical Sciences
2003	Fellow of the Faculty of Public Health (FFPH)	Royal College of Physicians
