= Daniel Osherson =

American psychologist (1949–2022)

- Born: Daniel Nathan Osherson; 1949
- Died: September 4, 2022 (aged 72–73); Princeton, NJ
- Education: University of Chicago (B.A., 1970), University of Pennsylvania (M.A., 1971; Ph.D., 1973)
- Scientific career
- Fields: Psychology
- Workplaces: Princeton University
- Thesis: Operations underlying certain logical abilities in children (1973)

Daniel Nathan Osherson (1949–2022) was an American psychologist and the Henry R. Luce Professor of Psychology at Princeton University.
