= Doherty Institute =

Medical research institute in Melbourne, Australia

The Peter Doherty Institute for Infection and Immunity
- Other name: Doherty Institute
- Motto: To improve health globally through discovery research and the prevention, treatment and cure of infectious diseases.
- Parent institution: University of Melbourne
- Founder: Laureate Professor Peter Doherty
- Focus: Finding solutions to prevent, treat and cure infectious diseases
- Chair: Professor Sharon Lewin
- Staff: 700+
- Address: 792 Elizabeth Street Melbourne, 3000
- Location: Melbourne, Victoria, Australia
- Coordinates: 37.7999992°S 144.9557458°E
- Interactive map of The Peter Doherty Institute for Infection and Immunity
- Website: www.doherty.edu.au

The Peter Doherty Institute for Infection and Immunity is a research institute located in Melbourne, Australia. The Doherty Institute is named after Laureate Professor Peter C. Doherty (Nobel prize winner in 1996). This institute is a joint venture between The University of Melbourne and The Royal Melbourne Hospital.

== COVID-19 response ==
=== Modelling Report for National Cabinet ===
Doherty Institute has advised the Australian government for the transition to nation reopening based upon the vaccination progress in the modelling report. This 4-phase transition plan depends upon the percentage (70%/*80%) of the fully vaccinated eligible population(16 years or older). In February 2022, the Doherty Institute advised against periodic six-month boosters.
