= Prevention of mental disorders =

Prevention of mental disorders consists of measures that try to decrease the chances of a mental disorder occurring. A 2004 WHO report stated that "prevention of these disorders is obviously one of the most effective ways to reduce the disease burden." The 2011 European Psychiatric Association (EPA) guidance on prevention of mental disorders states "There is considerable evidence that various psychiatric conditions can be prevented through the implementation of effective evidence-based interventions." A 2011 UK Department of Health report on the economic case for mental health promotion and mental illness prevention found that "many interventions are outstandingly good value for money, low in cost and often become self-financing over time, saving public expenditure". In 2016, the National Institute of Mental Health re-affirmed prevention as a research priority area.

== Methods ==
=== Physical exercise and self-care ===
Physical exercise and self-care (such as maintaining a predictable sleeping schedule) can prevent mental disorders.

=== Parenting ===
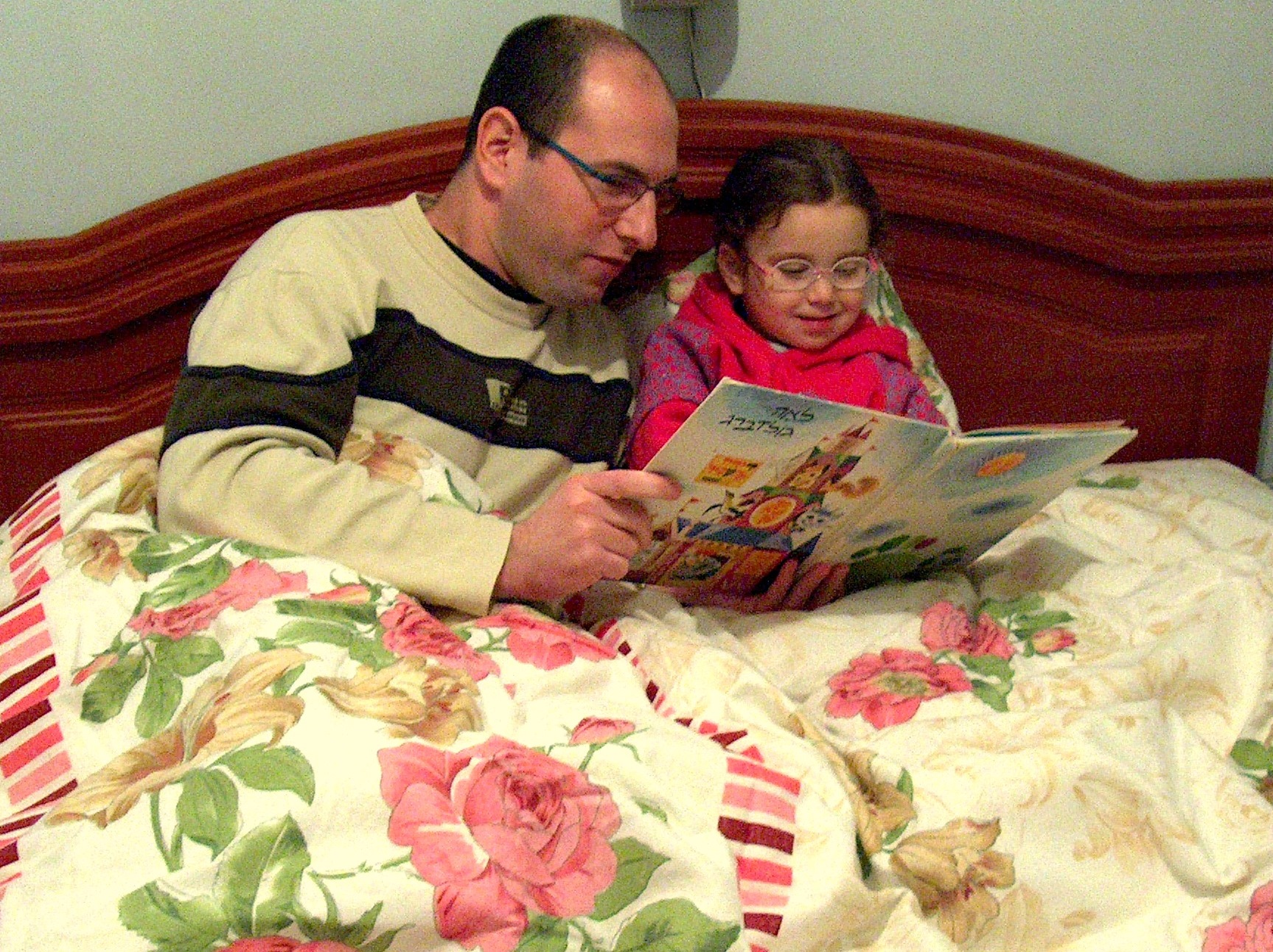
A father and daughter read a bedtime story. Positive parenting practices can reduce the risk of some mental disorders.

Parenting may affect the child's mental health, and evidence suggests that helping parents to be more effective with their children can address mental health needs.

Assessing parenting capability has been raised in child protection and other contexts. Delaying of potential very young pregnancies could lead to better mental health causal risk factors such as improved parenting skills and more stable homes, and various approaches have been used to encourage such behaviour change. Some countries run conditional cash transfer welfare programs where payment is conditional on behaviour of the recipients. Compulsory contraception has been used to prevent future mental illness.

=== Pre-emptive cognitive behavioural therapy ===
Use of cognitive behavioral therapy (CBT) with people at risk has significantly reduced the number of episodes of generalized anxiety disorder and other anxiety symptoms, and also given significant improvements in explanatory style, hopelessness, and dysfunctional attitudes. In 2014 the UK National Institute for Health and Care Excellence (NICE) recommended preventive CBT for people at risk of psychosis. As of 2018, some health providers now advocate pre-emptive use of CBT to prevent worsening of mental illnesses.

=== Mental silence meditation ===
Sahaja meditators scored above control groups for emotional well-being and mental health measures on SF-36 ratings, leading to proposed use for mental illness prevention, although this result could be due to meditators having other characteristics leading to good mental health, such as higher general self care.

=== Internet- and mobile-based interventions ===
A review found that a number of studies have shown that internet- and mobile-based interventions can be effective in preventing mental disorders.

== Specific diseases ==
=== Depression ===
For depressive disorders, when people participated in interventions, some studies show the number of new cases is reduced by 22% to 38%. These interventions included CBT. Such interventions also save costs. Depression prevention continues to be called for.

=== Anxiety ===
For anxiety disorders,

- use of cognitive behavioral therapy (CBT) with people at risk has significantly reduced the number of episodes of generalized anxiety disorder and other anxiety symptoms, and also given significant improvements in explanatory style, hopelessness, and dysfunctional attitudes. Other interventions (parental inhibition reduction, behaviourism, parental modelling, problem-solving and communication skills) have also produced significant benefits. People with subthreshold panic disorder were found to benefit from use of CBT.
- for older people, a stepped-care intervention (watchful waiting, CBT and medication if appropriate) achieved a 50% lower incidence rate of depression and anxiety disorders in a patient group aged 75 or older.
- for younger people, it has been found that teaching CBT in schools reduced anxiety in children, and a review found that most universal, selective and indicated prevention programs are effective in reducing symptoms of anxiety in children and adolescents.
- for university students mindfulness has been shown to reduce subsequent anxiety.

=== Psychosis ===
In those at high risk there is tentative evidence that psychosis incidence may be reduced with the use of CBT or other types of therapy. In 2014 the UK National Institute for Health and Care Excellence (NICE) recommended preventive CBT for people at risk of psychosis.

There is also tentative evidence that treatment may help those with early symptoms. Antipsychotic medications are not recommended for preventing psychosis.

For schizophrenia, one study of preventative CBT showed a positive effect and another showed neutral effect.

=== Bipolar disorder ===
Attempts at prevention of bipolar disorder have focused on stress (such as childhood adversity or highly conflictual families) which, although not a diagnostically specific causal agent for bipolar, does place genetically and biologically vulnerable individuals at risk for a more severe course of illness. Longitudinal studies have indicated that full-blown manic stages are often preceded by a variety of prodromal clinical features, providing support for the occurrence of an at-risk state of the disorder when an early intervention might prevent its further development and/or improve its outcome. Circadian rhythm disruptions such as traveling across many time zones (jet lag) can destabilize bipolar disorder and lead to manic or psychotic episodes.

== Targeted vs universal ==
There has been an historical trend among public health professionals to consider targeted programmes. However identification of high risk groups can increase stigma, in turn meaning that the targeted people do not engage. Thus policy recommends universal programs, with resources within such programs weighted towards high risk groups.

Universal prevention (aimed at a population that has no increased risk for developing a mental disorder, such as school programs or mass media campaigns) need very high numbers of people to show effect (sometimes known as the "power" problem). Approaches to overcome this are (1) focus on high-incidence groups (e.g. by targeting groups with high risk factors), (2) use multiple interventions to achieve greater, and thus more statistically valid, effects, (3) use cumulative meta-analyses of many trials, and (4) run very large trials.

== History ==
=== History of mental illness prevention strategies ===
- In 2020 a US paper identified the need for prevention, and led with focus on preventing traumatic events and adverse childhood experiences. A European paper highlighted "addressing both poor parenting and children's maladaptive personality traits and insufficient life skills."
- In 2018 the University of Birmingham Mental Health Policy Commission focused on prevention, including the challenges of funding given the shortness of political cycles versus the longer paybacks of prevention.
- In 2018 11 European researchers published a review of mental illness prevention stating that "Increasing evidence suggests that preventive interventions in psychiatry that are feasible, safe, and cost-effective could translate into a broader focus on prevention in our field." and that "Gaps between knowledge, policy, and practice need to be bridged."
- The US Substance Abuse and Mental Health Services Administration (SAMHSA) advocates a 5-step prevention framework.
- In 2016:
  - the UK NGO Mental Health Foundation published a review of prevention approaches.
  - the UK NGO Mind produced public mental health recommendations for more prevention.
- In 2015:
  - the Hunter Institute of mental health in Australia published its "Prevention First" strategic framework for prevention.
  - the UK NGO Mental Health Foundation published a review of prevention research, paving the way for prevention strategies.
  - the official journal of the World Psychiatric Association included a survey of public mental health which concluded "the evidence base for public mental health interventions is convincing, and the time is now ripe to move from knowledge to action".
- In 2014 the UK Chief Medical Officer, Professor Dame Sally Davies, chose mental health for her major annual report, and included prevention of mental illness heavily in this.
- In 2013 the Faculty of Public Health, the UK professional body for public health professionals, produced its "Better Mental Health for All" resource, which aims at "the promotion of mental wellbeing and the primary prevention of mental illness".
- In 2012, Mind, the UK mental health NGO, included "Staying well; Support people likely to develop mental health problems, to stay well." as its first goal for 2012–16.
- The 2011 mental health strategy of Manitoba (Canada) included intents to (i) reduce risk factors associated with mental ill-health and (ii) increase mental health promotion for both adults and children.
- The 2011 US National Prevention Strategy included mental and emotional well-being, with recommendations including (i) better parenting and (ii) early intervention.
- Australia's mental health plan for 2009–14 included "Prevention and Early Intervention" as priority 2.
- The 2008 EU "Pact for Mental Health" made recommendations for youth and education including (i) promotion of parenting skills, (ii) integration of socio-emotional learning into education curricular and extracurricular activities, and (iii) early intervention throughout the educational system.
- The 2006 Canadian "Out of the Shadows at last" included a section on prevention.

=== History of mental illness prevention programmes and research ===
Historically prevention has been a very small part of the spend of mental health systems. For instance the 2009 UK Department of Health analysis of prevention expenditure did not include any apparent spend on mental health. The situation is the same in research.

However more recently some prevention programmes have been proposed or implemented. Prevention programmes can include public health policies to raise general health, creating supportive environments, strengthening communities, developing personal skills, and reorienting services.

- In 2022 research showed the World Health Organization Self-Help Plus programme, at six-month follow-up, saw 22% incidence of mental disorder vs 41% in a control group, in Syrian refugees in Turkey.
- In 2016, the UK Education Policy Institute advocated prevention through increased mental health literacy, better parenting and improving children's resilience and digital world skills.
- In 2013 the UK NGO Mental Health Foundation and partners began to use Video Interaction Guidance (VIG) in an early years intervention to reduce later life mental illness.
- In 2013 in Australia the National Health and Medical Research Council supported a set of parenting strategies to prevent teenagers becoming anxious or depressed.
- In 2012 the UK Schizophrenia Commission recommended "a preventative strategy for psychosis including promoting protective factors for mental wellbeing and reducing risks such as cannabis use in early adolescence."
- In 2010 the European Union DataPrev database was launched. It states "A healthy start is crucial for mental health and wellbeing throughout life, with parenting being the single most important factor," and recommends a range of interventions.
- In 2009 the US National Academies publication on preventing mental, emotional, and behavioral disorders among young people focused on recent research and program experience and stated that "A number of promotion and prevention programs are now available that should be considered for broad implementation." A 2011 review of this by the authors said "A scientific base of evidence shows that we can prevent many mental, emotional, and behavioral disorders before they begin" and made recommendations including
  - supporting the mental health and parenting skills of parents,
  - encouraging the developmental competencies of children and
  - using preventive strategies particularly for children at risk (such as children of parents with mental illness, or with family stresses such as divorce or job loss).

In India the 1982 National Mental health Programme included prevention, but implementation has been slow, particularly of prevention elements.

It is already known that home visiting programs for pregnant women and parents of young children can produce replicable effects on children's general health and development in a variety of community settings. Similarly positive benefits from social and emotional education are well proven. Research has shown that risk assessment and behavioral interventions in pediatric clinics reduced abuse and neglect outcomes for young children. Early childhood home visitation also reduced abuse and neglect, but results were inconsistent.

== Issues in implementation ==
Prevention programs can face issues in (i) ownership, because health systems are typically targeted at current cases, and (ii) funding, because program benefits come on longer timescales than the normal political and management cycle. Assembling collaborations of interested bodies appears to be an effective model for achieving sustained commitment and funding.
