= Australian Academy of Health and Medical Sciences =

Australian academic organization

The Australian Academy of Health and Medical Sciences is an academy to promote health and medical sciences in Australia. It was established in June 2014.

It cites "The Academy will serve the three purposes identified as of high priority in the 2013 Strategic Review of Health and Medical Research":

- Mentoring the next generation of clinician researchers
- Providing independent advice to government and others on issues relating to evidence-based medical practice and medical researchers
- Providing a forum for discussion on progress on medical research with an emphasis on translation of research into practice

== Fellowship ==
In 2014 the academy commenced awarding the honour of "Fellow of the Australian Academy of Health and Medical Sciences" to 50 medical scientists each year.

Elected fellows include:

- John Aitken elected 2015
- Warwick Anderson (born 1958) elected 2015
- Louise Baur elected 2014
- C. Glenn Begley elected 2015
- Samuel Berkovic (born 1953) elected 2015
- Jeffrey Braithwaite elected 2017
- Richard Bryant (born 1960) elected 2016
- Roger Byard elected 2016
- Ed Byrne (born 1952) elected 2015
- Jonathan Carapetis (born 1961) elected 2014
- John Carlin elected 2018
- Jeremy Chapman (born 1953) elected 2017
- Georgia Chenevix-Trench (born 1959) elected 2015
- Helen Christensen elected 2015
- John Christodoulou elected 2017
- Arthur Christopoulos elected 2017
- Judith Clements elected 2017
- Clare Collins elected 2019
- David Cooper (1949–2018) elected 2015
- Brendan Crabb (born 1966) elected 2015
- Annette Dobson (born 1945) elected 2015
- Peter C. Doherty (born 1940) elected 2015
- Stephen Duckett (born 1950) elected 2015
- David Durrheim (born 1962) elected 2018
- Sandra Eades (born 1967) elected 2014
- Alan Finkel elected 2015
- Nicholas Fisk (born 1956) elected 2015
- Ian Frazer (born 1953) elected 2014
- Frank Gannon (born 1947) elected 2015
- Katharina Gaus elected 2015
- Jozef Gécz elected 2015
- Paul Glasziou (born 1954) elected 2015
- Michael F. Good elected 2015
- Adele Green (born 1952) elected 2015
- Michelle Haber (born 1956) elected 2015
- Wayne Denis Hall elected 2015
- David Handelsman elected 2015
- Doug Hilton (born 1964) elected 2015
- Michael Kidd (born 1959) elected 2015
- Alison Kitson elected 2015
- Peter Klinken (born 1953) elected 2015
- David de Kretser (born 1939) elected 2015
- Richard Larkins elected 2015
- Sharon Lewin elected 2014
- Julio Licinio elected 2015
- Melissa Little elected 2015
- Fabienne Mackay elected 2016
- Stephen MacMahon elected 2015
- Caroline McMillen elected 2015
- Lisa Maher elected 2017
- Barry Marshall (born 1951) elected 2015
- Nick Martin (born 1950) elected 2015
- Colin L. Masters (born 1947) elected 2015
- John Mattick (born 1950) elected 2015
- Kirsten McCaffery elected 2020
- Colette McKay elected 2021
- Kathryn North elected 2014
- Anushka Patel elected 2015
- Steven Petrou (born 1962) elected 2015
- Susan Pond elected 2015
- John E. J. Rasko (born 1961) elected 2015
- Karen Reynolds elected 2015
- Maree Teesson elected 2015
- Jane Visvader elected 2016
- Claire Wainwright elected 2016
- Keryn Williams (born 1949) elected 2016
- Fiona Wood (born 1958) elected 2015
- Sophia Zoungas elected 2022
