= Peter Cook (disambiguation) =

Peter Cook (1937–1995) was a British comedian.

Peter Cook may also refer to:

== Architects ==
- Peter Cook (architect) (born 1936), British architect
- Peter Cook (born c. 1959), architect and fourth husband of Christie Brinkley

== Politics ==
- Peter Cook (Australian politician) (1943–2005), Australian senator
- Peter Cook (MP), Member of Parliament for Leominster, 1390 and 1391

== Sport ==
- Peter Cook (Australian footballer) (1932–2025), Australian footballer for Melbourne
- Peter Cook (English footballer) (1927–1960), English footballer
- Peter Cook (jockey) (born 1950), retired Australian jockey
- Peter Cook (rugby union) (born 1943), English rugby union player

== Others ==
- Peter Cook (antiques) (1924–2003), Australian antique dealer and For Love or Money panellist
- Peter Cook (artist), Australian artist, co-founder of Green Ant Research Arts and Publishing in 1990
- Peter Cook (geologist) (born 1938), Australian geologist
- Peter Cook (press secretary), financial news anchor and press secretary
- Peter Samuel Cook (1928–2004), British serial rapist
- Peter Mackenzie (born Peter Cook, 1961), American actor

== See also ==
- Peter Coke (1913–2008), English actor, playwright and artist
- Peter Cooke (disambiguation)
