= Ian Constable Lecture =

The Ian Constable Lecture is an annual lecture given in Perth, Western Australia.

It honours the contribution and achievements of Professor Ian Constable, an Australian ophthalmologist and the founder of the Lions Eye Institute in Perth.

The University of Western Australia lecture has been given since 2000.

== Years ==
=== 2000s ===
2000: The inaugural Lecture was presented on 4 October at the University of WA's Octagon Theatre by Professor Joseph Vacanti, the John Homans Professor of Surgery at Harvard Medical School and Massachusetts General Hospital (MGH) and Director of the Wellman Surgical Laboratories, Laboratory for Tissue Engineering and Organ Fabrication, and Pediatric Transplantation at MGH. The lecture was title 'Tissue engineering: 21st Century tissue repair'.

2001: The 2001 Lecture was presented on 19 September at the University of WA's Winthrop Hall by Dr Nadia Rosenthal, European Molecular Biology Laboratory, Italy. The Lecture was 'How to build a better muscle'.

2002: The 2002 Lecture was presented on 18 September at the University of WA's Octagon Theatre by Professor Bob Williamson, Director of the Murdoch Children's Research Institute at the Royal Children's Hospital in Melbourne on 'The Impact of Human Genetics on Medicine - Genes, Ethics and the Community'.

2003: The 2003 Lecture was presented on 10 September at the FJ Clarke Lecture Theatre at the QEII Campus of the University of WA by Professor Mandyam V Srinivasan, Professor of Visual Science and Director of the Centre for Visual Science at the Australian National University, on 'Insect Vision Navigation - applications in defence systems and planetary exploration'.

2004: The 2004 Lecture was presented on 23 August at the FJ Clarke Lecture Theatre at the QEII Campus of the University of WA by Professor Paul Sieving, director, National Eye Institute, National Institutes of Health; Bethesda, Maryland, on 'Evolution of disease understanding - the X-factor uncovered'

2005: The 2005 Lecture was presented on 21 April at the University of WA's Winthrop Hall by Professor Julian D. Gale, Premier's Research Fellow and Professor of Computational chemistry at the Nanochemistry Research Institute, Curtin University of Technology. The Lecture was 'The Computer as a Window on the Nanoworld'.

2006: The 2006 Lecture was presented on 27 September at the University of WA's Octagon Theatre by Professor Barry Marshall, joint winner of the 2005 Nobel Prize in Physiology or Medicine and Senior Principal Research Fellow Microbiology and Immunology, in The University of Western Australia's School of Biomedical, Biomolecular and Chemical Sciences, on 'Past Lessons and Future Possibilities for the Ulcer Bug'.

2007: The 2007 Lecture was delivered on 10 September at the University of WA's Octagon Theatre by Professor Peter Quinn, Professor of Astronomy at the University of Western Australia's School of Physics and Premier's Fellow. Professor Quinn presented an overview of modern astronomy and mankind's quest to find the dawn of creation.

2008: The 2008 Lecture was delivered on 15 September at the University of WA's Octagon Theatre by Associate Professor David Mackey, University of Melbourne Department of Ophthalmology, and Clinical Professor at the University of Tasmania, on 'The 'I' in Personalised Genetics'.

2009: The 2009 Lecture was delivered on 5 October at the University of WA's Octagon Theatre by Professor Anne Kelso, Director of the World Health Organization Collaborating Centre for Reference and Research on Influenza, on 'The 21st Century Pandemic'.

=== 2010s ===
2010: The 2010 Lecture was delivered on 28 September at the University of WA's Octagon Theatre by Professor Rolf Zinkernagel, 1966 Nobel Laureate in Physiology or Medicine (with Peter C. Doherty) and Professor Emeritus of Experimental Immunology, University of Zurich, on 'Regulation of Immunity and Immunopathology by Antigen'

2011: The 2011 Lecture was delivered on 17 October at the University of WA's Octagon Theatre by Professor Ian Frazer, CEO of the Translational Research Institute in Brisbane and co-creator of the technology for the cervical cancer vaccines. The topic was " Now, free, and perfect? How to live a long and healthy life in the 21st century"

2012: The 2012 Lecture was delivered by Professor Matt Brown, a specialist in immunogenetics and Director of the Diamantina Institute at the University of Queensland. The title of Professor Brown's lecture was "Genetics and the Future of Medicine."

2013: The 2013 Lecture was delivered by Professor John V Forrester, Professor in Ocular Immunology at The University of Western Australia on 3 October 2013. The title of Professor Forrester's lecture was "Autoimmunity and Latent Infectious Disease."

2014: The 2014 Lecture was delivered by Professor Ryan Lister, Future Fellow Plant Energy Biology, ARC Centre of Excellence, at the University of Western Australia on 9 September. The title of Professor Lister's lecture was "Exploring the Epigenome: from stem cells to your brain, and everything in between."

2015: The 2015 Lecture was delivered by Nobel Laureate Professor Elizabeth H. Blackburn, Morris Herzstein Professor in Biology and Physiology, University of California, San Francisco at the University of Western Australia on 3 August. The title of Professor Blackburn's lecture was "Implications of Telomere Maintenance in Aging-Related Processes and Diseases."

2016: The 2016 Lecture was delivered by Professor John Mattick, Executive Director, Garvan Institute of Medical Research, Sydney at the University of Western Australia on 1 December. The lecture was titled " The Central Role of RNA in Human Evolution and Development."

2017: The 2017 Lecture was delivered by Professor Simon Foote, Director of The John Curtin School of Medical Research at The Australian National University on 11 October. The lecture was titled: " Genome research produces new anti-malarial drug targets."

2018: The 2018 Lecture was delivered on 5 September by Professor Andrew Dick, Director of University College London Institute of Ophthalmology. The lecture was titled: "A Tale of Two Diseases: regulating immune responses in the retina."

2019: The 2019 Lecture was delivered on 24 October by Professor Keith Martin, managing director of the Centre for Eye Research Australia. The lecture was titled: "Glaucoma: What’s on the horizon?"

=== 2020s ===
2020: The 2020 Lecture was delivered on 21 October by Professor Shane Maloney, Head of the School of Human Sciences at The University of Western Australia. The lecture was titled: "When the clock is ticking: Biological clocks and body temperatures."

2021: The 2021 Lecture was delivered on 27 October by Associate Professor Danail Obreschkow, a theoretical astrophysicist at The University of Western Australia's node of the International Centre for Radio Astronomy Research. The lecture was titled "The Astounding Nature of Space and Time".

2022: The 2022 lecture was delivered on 12 October 2022 by Professor Thomas W Gardner, Professor of Ophthalmology & Visual Sciences, Molecular and Integrative Physiology and Internal Medicine at the University of Michigan, USA. The lecture was titled "The evolution of ideas in medicine".

2023: The 2023 lecture was delivered on 16 November 2023 by Professor Balwantray Chauhan, Mathers Professor and Research Director of Ophthalmology and Visual Sciences, Professor of Physiology and Biophysics and Professor of Medical Neurosciences at Dalhousie University in Canada. The lecture was titled "Understanding glaucoma through imaging of single cells".

2025: The 2025 lecture was delivered on 26 February 2025 by Professor Ian Meredith AM, Vice Chancellor's Professorial Fellow at Monash University in Melbourne and serving on the boards of a range of national and international MedTech companies. The lecture was titled "Global health challenges: How and why innovative MedTech solutions will make a difference".

2026: The 2026 lecture was delivered on 11 March 2026 by Professor Graham Barrett AM, a world-renowned ophthalmologist who trained in Western Australia, with specialist experience gained in the USA. The lecture is titled "Vision, Surgery and Optics: A Modern Miracle".
