= Learning-by-doing (economics) =

Learning through practice, self-perfection and minor innovations

Learning-by-doing is a concept in economic theory by which productivity is achieved through practice, self-perfection and minor innovations. An example is a factory that increases output by learning how to use equipment better without adding workers or investing significant amounts of capital.

With roots all the way by to Adam Smith's analysis of pin manufacturing, the quantification of the idea was realised from the manufacturing of B17 Flying Fortress bombers during World War II. For B17's the costs reduced proportionally with the cumulative manufacturing, rather than with ongoing volume. This explains the non-linearity of learning-by-doing cost reduction, as seen for example in semiconductor manufacturing or with solar PV production.

The concept of learning-by-doing has been used by Kenneth Arrow in his design of endogenous growth theory to explain effects of innovation and technical change. Robert Lucas, Jr. adopted the concept to explain increasing returns to embodied human capital. Xiaokai Yang and Jeff Borland have shown learning-by-doing plays a role in the evolution of countries to greater specialisation in production. In both these cases, learning-by-doing and increasing returns provide an engine for long run growth.

Recently, it has become a popular explaining concept in the evolutionary economics and resource-based view (RBV) of the firm.

The Toyota Production System is known for Kaizen, that is explicitly built upon learning-by-doing effects.

== See also ==
- Experience curve effects – Relationship between experience producing a good and the efficiency of that production
- Learning curve – Relationship between proficiency and experience
