= Bali Mandara Eye Hospital =

Coordinates: 8.6525°S 115.2232°E

- Bali Provincial Government

Geography
- Location: Jl. Angsoka 8, Dangin Puri Kangin, Denpasar Utara, Denpasar, Bali, Indonesia

Organisation
- Type: Specialist

Services
- Speciality: Eye

Links
- Website: rsmatabalimandara.baliprov.go.id
- Lists: Hospitals in Indonesia

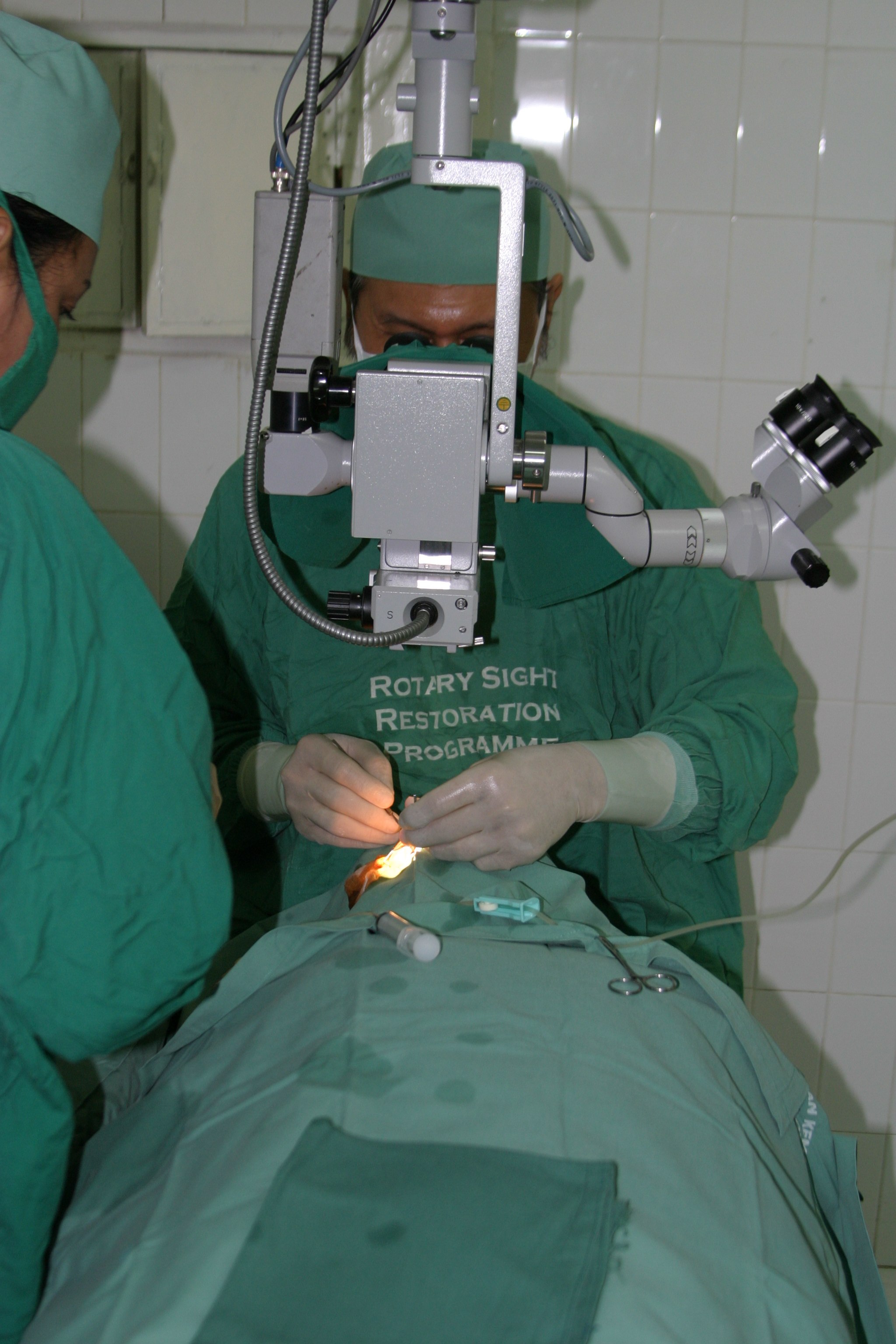
Doctors perform eye surgery on a patient at the clinic

The Bali Mandara Eye Hospital (Indonesian: Rumah Sakit Mata Bali Mandara, until 2013 Australia Bali Memorial Eye Centre or ABMEC) is an ophthalmology clinic and day surgery centre in Indonesia, built in memory of the 2002 Bali bombings.

== History ==
The construction of the Centre was part of the Australian Government's Bali Recovery Package after the 2002 Bali bombings, and was achieved after a submission to the Australian Government from the John Fawcett Foundation. The $7 million project was commissioned by AusAID, with a design team which included experts from Australia and Indonesia. It opened officially on 27 July 2007 and began treating patients on 1 October 2007. The Centre is owned and managed by the Bali Provincial Department of Health and operated in partnership with the John Fawcett Foundation and its Indonesian arm, the Yayasan Kemanusiaan Indonesia. The Australian Government handed over the ABMEC to the Indonesian Government on 13 October 2015, while renaming it "Bali Mandara Eye Hospital". Staff from the Lions Eye Institute in Perth, Western Australia, were instrumental in setting up the Centre. The Institute's director of nursing, Elizabeth Zambotti, commissioned the facility after playing a key role in its development, while Institute director Professor Ian Constable oversaw training of Indonesian ophthalmologists by LEI staff.

In the first two days 160 Indonesian patients were seen and a dozen cataract operations were performed by Indonesian ophthalmologists.

== Facilities ==
The Centre has a training facility with digital imaging teaching capacity to enhance the surgical skills of young Indonesian and Australian graduate ophthalmologists, providing for academic exchange between Indonesian and Australian ophthalmologists and trainees. Theatres provide digital imaging from microscopic views of eye surgeries for capture, replay and analysis. The wet lab also has video imaging facilities for teaching.

It is planned to develop specialized clinics in the Centre for glaucoma and diabetic retinopathy which are on the increase in the Balinese community. The Centre also has optometry facilities with basic manufacturing and assembling capacity to cater for the almost 70 per cent of poor patients who benefit from remedial glasses.

In the event of a natural disaster on Bali, the 2,500 sq m two-story building also has the potential to become a first-level trauma centre, as it has two theatres/three-table surgical capacity and high quality sterilization, x-ray and ultrasound facilities.

Two mobile eye surgical units are attached to the Centre and cover remote areas on Bali. Each mobile clinic team with one ophthalmic surgeon, four nurses and two drivers can check over 18,000 people with eye problems per year and perform around 1,200 cataract operations.
