= Peter Cooke =

Peter Cooke may refer to:

- Peter Cooke (politician) (born 1949), American businessman and politician
- Peter Cooke (sailor) (1924–2001), Kenyan sailor
- Peter Cooke (Scouting), British Overseas Secretary and the Commonwealth Secretary of the Scout Association

== See also ==
- Peter Cook (disambiguation)
