= Neil Piller =

Australian professor

Neil "George" Piller AM is an Australian professor of lymphology at the Department of Surgery, School of Medicine, Flinders University.

Piller is also the Director of the Lymphoedema Assessment Unit, Flinders Surgical Oncology as well as member of the Flinders University microcirculatory and lymphological research group. Piller's major interest is in the accurate diagnosis of, targeted treatment for and management of all forms of primary and secondary lymphoedema.

Piller was appointed a Member of the Order of Australia in the 2026 Australia Day Honours for "significant service to lymphology as a clinician and academic".
