= Bruce Neill =

Australian cricketer (born 1949)

Personal information
- Full name: Bruce William Neill
- Born: 23 February 1949 (age 77); Cabramatta, New South Wales, Australia
- Batting: Right-handed

Domestic team information
- Years: Team
- 1977/78: Tasmania

Career statistics
Competition	First-class	List A
Matches	3	1
Runs scored	95	0
Batting average	15.83	0.00
100s/50s	0/0	0/0
Top score	43	0
Catches/stumpings	2/–	0/–
- Source: CricketArchive, 3 November 2010

Bruce William Neill AO (born 23 February 1949) is an Australian cricketer who played for Tasmania. He was a right-handed batsman who only represented the team briefly during the 1977–78 season. He was born at Cabramatta, New South Wales in 1949.

Neill was appointed as an Officer of the Order of Australia (AO) in the 2026 Australia Day Honours for "distinguished service to the community through philanthropic support, to governance of medical research organisations, to the arts, and to cricket".
