= Anne Hollonds =

Anne Inkeri Hollonds AO (born 1957) is the former Australian National Children's Commissioner. She was appointed to this position in November 2020 and ended her term in November 2025. Prior to this role she was the Director of the Australian Institute of Family Studies. For more than 23 years Anne has been a Chief Executive Officer of government and non-government organisations focussed on policy, service delivery and research in health, education and social services, including the Benevolent Society and Relationships Australia NSW.

Hollonds was born in Tampere, Finland and travelled to Australia with her family in 1958. Growing up in the North Shore area of Sydney, Hollonds spoke Finnish and English. Hollonds has two daughters.

Hollonds was appointed as an Officer of the Order of Australia (AO) in the 2026 Australia Day Honours for "distinguished service to family, children and community safety, wellbeing and human rights, and to policy, research and practice".
