= Lainie Anderson =

Australian historian, journalist, and novelist (born 1970)

Lainie Anderson OAM
- Anderson in 2026
- Born: 28 February 1970 (age 56); Cleve, South Australia, Australia
- Education: South Australian College of Advanced Education (BA); University of South Australia (DPhil)
- Occupations: Journalist; historian; novelist
- Spouse: Max Anderson
- Children: 2

Academic background
- Thesis: Murder mystery as history: the indomitable Miss Cocks. re-presenting pioneer policewoman Kate Cocks (2024)

Academic work
- Discipline: Creative writing
- Institutions: University of South Australia
- Website: lainieanderson.com.au

Lainie Lee Anderson (born 28 February 1970) is an Australian novelist, historian and former journalist.

Anderson studied at the then South Australian College of Advanced Education (now the University of South Australia), graduating with a Bachelor of Arts in journalism in 1990. Her journalism career began at the Sunraysia Daily newspaper in north-west Victoria. She worked as a state political reporter for the Herald Sun in Melbourne and later as a sub-editor at The Times in London. Anderson returned to Adelaide in 2000 to work in public relations, journalism and broadcasting, including a 17-year stint as a columnist for the Sunday Mail.

In 2010, Anderson co-founded the resource website Mining Family Matters. In 2016, she was awarded a Churchill Fellowship to research the 1919 England-to-Australia air race. The fellowship resulted in her debut novel, Long Flight Home. She also co-produced the one-hour television documentary The Greatest Air Race. In 2021, Anderson began doctoral studies at her alma mater, researching the life of pioneering South Australian policewoman Kate Cocks. This research provided the starting point for her historical crime fiction.

== Early life and education ==
Lainie Lee Anderson was born in Cleve, South Australia, on 28 February 1970. She attended Port Vincent Primary School and Minlaton High School on Yorke Peninsula. Inspired by her English and Australian history teacher, she developed an interest in journalism. Anderson enrolled at the then South Australian College of Advanced Education (now the University of South Australia) in 1987 and graduated with a Bachelor of Arts in journalism in 1990.

== Career ==
The Sunraysia Daily hired Anderson in Mildura, Victoria, in 1989. She subsequently worked for the Shepparton News and The Weekly Times. From 1995 to 1998, she worked as a political journalist for the Herald Sun in Melbourne. After moving to London, Anderson worked casual shifts for several Fleet Street newspapers before joining The Times as a full-time sub-editor from 1999 to 2001.

In May 2000, Anderson returned to Adelaide, working briefly at The Advertiser before taking up the role of public relations manager with the South Australian Tourism Commission. She continued to work there until 2005. Anderson later served in a similar role for Education Adelaide from 2006 to 2009. She wrote a weekly column in the Sunday Mail from 2006 to 2023 and was also a fill-in radio host at FIVEaa from 2008 to 2011. In 2009, Anderson wrote a column about the historic Vickers Vimy biplane at Adelaide Airport, which inspired further research into the 1919 flight from England to Australia by South Australians Ross and Keith Smith and their air mechanics, Wally Shiers of South Australia and Jim Bennett of Victoria.

In 2010, Anderson co-founded Mining Family Matters with her friend Alicia Ranford. The resource website supports families in the mining and resources industries, particularly those affected by fly-in fly-out (FIFO) operations in remote locations. Their award-winning guidebook, The Survival Guide for Mining Families, has been published in English, French and Dutch, with more than 180,000 copies sold. Anderson served as co-director until 2022.

Anderson was appointed to the board of the Adelaide Riverbank Authority for a term that ended in 2018. In 2026, she was vice-president of the History Council of South Australia, a member of the board of trustees of the History Trust of South Australia and a South Australian representative on the Federation of Australian Historical Societies.

The historic Vickers Vimy on display at Adelaide Airport, September 2025

In 2016, Anderson was awarded a Churchill Fellowship to research the historical significance of the 1919 air race from London to Darwin. The fellowship was undertaken in 2017 and involved research in nine countries over seven weeks. Following the fellowship, Anderson wrote her debut novel, Long Flight Home, which tells the story of the air race and was published by Wakefield Press.

She also joined her husband Max Anderson and friend Susan Harrington in co-producing the one-hour documentary The Greatest Air Race, presented and narrated by astronaut Andy Thomas. The documentary premiered on SBS television in November 2019.

Also in 2019, Anderson was appointed ambassador and coordinator for the Epic Flight Centenary by the History Trust of South Australia. She was also selected as a member of the South Australian Regional Selection Committee of the Winston Churchill Memorial Trust.

During the COVID-19 lockdown in 2020, Anderson began exploring the life and career of Moonta-born pioneering policewoman Kate Cocks. On 12 February 2021, she began a PhD in communication at the University of South Australia, examining archival material held by state cultural institutions, including the State Library of South Australia, State Records of South Australia and South Australia Police archives. She submitted her thesis in November 2023, and was awarded her doctorate in 2024.

The creative manuscript from her thesis was a work of fiction inspired by Cocks's life and Adelaide during World War I. Anderson subsequently signed a two-book deal with Hachette Australia for the publication of The Death of Dora Black and Murder on North Terrace.

In 2021, Anderson volunteered as a media adviser and spokesperson for Voluntary Assisted Dying South Australia, supporting the campaign to legalise voluntary assisted dying in the state. She said she was inspired by her father, Don Barnes, who had advocated for voluntary assisted dying before his death from cancer in 2009. From 2021 to 2024, Anderson served on the board of Reconciliation South Australia. She has also been an ambassador for the Hutt Street Centre.

== Honours and awards ==
In 2011, Anderson and her Mining Family Matters co-founder won a national Australian Mining Prospect Award for community interaction. In 2012, they shared a People's Choice Award at the South Australia Telstra Business Awards. In 2013, they shared the Brand South Australia Regional Award for Innovation. In 2015, Anderson received another Australian Mining Prospect Award and was jointly awarded the Health Award at the South Australian Regional Awards.

In 2023, Anderson received the Emerging Historian of the Year award from the History Council of South Australia. She was awarded the Medal of the Order of Australia (OAM) in the 2026 Australia Day Honours for service to community history.

== Personal life ==
Anderson lives in Adelaide with her husband, Max. They have twin sons, Harry and Jack.

== Publications ==
- Anderson, Lainie (2019). Long Flight Home. Wakefield Press. ISBN 978-1-74305-663-9.
- Anderson, Lainie (8 November 2022). "Hidden women of history: Kate Cocks, the pioneering policewoman who fought crime and ran a home for babies—but was no saint". The Conversation.
- Anderson, Lainie (2024). "From Fact to Historic Fiction and Beyond: A Journalist's Journey into a Parallel Academic Universe". A/B: Auto/Biography Studies. 39 (3): 715–728. doi:10.1080/08989575.2024.2429319.
- Anderson, Lainie (28 August 2024). The Death of Dora Black. A Petticoat Police Mystery. Hachette Australia. ISBN 9780733652073.
- Anderson, Lainie (30 September 2025). Murder on North Terrace. A Petticoat Police Mystery. Hachette Australia. ISBN 9780733652097.
