= Paul Watters =

Australian academic

Paul Watters OAM is an Australian cybercrime researcher and cybersecurity professional. He is Honorary Professor of Criminology and Security Studies at Macquarie University. Dr. Watters has made significant research contributions to cybercrime detection and prevention, including phishing, malware, piracy and child exploitation. He is the inventor of the 100 Point Cyber Check, a cyber risk assessment for small-medium enterprises. According to ScholarGPS, he is ranked in the top 0.5% of researchers globally. As documented in the Mathematics Genealogy Project and Neurotree, he is a disciplinary descendant of both Carl Friedrich Gauss and Charles Robert Darwin.

In the 2026 Australia Day Honours, Watters was awarded the Medal of the Order of Australia.

== Education ==
Watters completed three theses and made significant contributions to the field of cognitive and neural modelling:

At the University of Tasmania, Watters studied under Frances Martin. His thesis contributed to foundational knowledge in cognitive neuroscience by establishing a nonlinear, quadratic dose-response relationship between caffeine and EEG complexity (measured by correlation dimension, D2), across various cognitive tasks. This research demonstrated that caffeine modulates brain dynamics in a task-specific manner, with an optimal range of doses increasing EEG complexity and thereby enhancing cognitive flexibility, while higher or lower doses reduce this complexity. By employing nonlinear dimensional analysis, the thesis provided insights into how psychoactive substances like caffeine influence brain activity beyond traditional linear models. These findings suggest that the brain's ability to operate in more complex, dynamic states under certain conditions is crucial for higher-order cognitive functions such as creativity, further linking EEG complexity to cognitive adaptability and performance.

At the University of Cambridge, Watters studied under David Tolhurst. His thesis contributed to the development of neural models of information processing and Artificial Intelligence by critically evaluating two approaches: Principal Components Analysis (PCA) and the sparse coding model. He compared these models in their ability to replicate the visual processing system's handling of natural scenes, characterised by sparse, scale-invariant, and phase-dependent structures. His thesis demonstrates that, under certain conditions, the simpler, orthogonal PCA model could achieve distributed representations comparable to the sparse coding model, challenging the necessity of the more complex, non-orthogonal model. The thesis also questioned the emphasis on sparseness as a key principle of visual processing, suggesting that sparseness had minimal impact on spatial-frequency and orientation tuning in simulations. The thesis thus provided a critical reassessment of neural modelling frameworks, advocating for future research that integrates non-linear techniques like independent components analysis (ICA) to address limitations in both PCA and the sparse coding model.

At Macquarie University, Watters studied under Michael Johnson. His thesis made several original contributions to the field of natural language processing (NLP) through the development of two neural network-based models: the Word Sense Acquisition Model (WSAM) and the Word Sense Processing Model (WSPM). The WSAM introduced an innovative framework for acquiring word senses from both European and Asian languages with high accuracy, showcasing its potential for multilingual NLP applications. The WSPM enhances word sense processing by integrating psycholinguistic insights, using decompositional semantic features and context to resolve lexical ambiguity more effectively than existing systems like SYSTRAN. Additionally, the thesis demonstrates how modelling both normal and abnormal human language processing, including semantic errors in Parkinson's disease, could inform the improvement of NLP systems, including the use of semantic priming. These contributions provide a foundation for more accurate and cognitively-aligned NLP systems capable of handling word sense disambiguation across different languages.
