= Adrian Paterson =

South African scientist and engineer

Adrian Paterson AM FRSN FTSE
- Occupations: Engineer, scientist
- Known for: Research and development on the Pebble Bed modular reactor
- Title: Former CEO of the ANSTO
- Awards: Doctor of Science (honoris causa), University of Wollongong, 2017

Adrian "Adi" Paterson is a South African scientist and engineer best known for his work on Pebble Bed modular reactor research and development. He was CEO of the Australian Nuclear Science and Technology Organisation (ANSTO) from March 2009 till September 2020.

== Career ==
Paterson was educated in South Africa, where he obtained a Bachelor in Science and Chemistry and a PhD in engineering from the University of Cape Town.

In 1984, Paterson joined South Africa's Council for Scientific and Industrial Research (CSIR) as a research scientist, working on ceramic materials. He was appointed to the organisation's executive in 1994. Paterson ultimately rose to positions of Executive Vice President and Chief Information Officer at CSIR. In 2001, he took a position at the Department of Science and Technology, which he held for four years.

In 2006, he became General Manager of Business Development Operations at the Pebble Bed Modular Reactor Company in South Africa, and held the position until December 2008. The Company downsized significantly following his departure. In 2010, Public Enterprises Minister Barbara Hogan described the project in Parliament saying that "between 2005 and 2009, it became increasingly clear that, based on the direct-cycle electricity design, PBMR's potential investor and customer market was severely restricted, and it was unable to acquire either [investors or customers]."

He emigrated to Australia in 2008 and was appointed chief executive officer at ANSTO in March 2009. That year, he was named a Fellow of the Australian Academy of Technology, Science and Engineering. Paterson was awarded 2012 Professional Engineer of the Year by the Sydney Division of Engineers Australia and also worked as an advisor on the TV documentary series Uranium - Twisting the Dragon's Tail (2015).

Paterson is an advocate for nuclear industrial development in Australia. In 2015 he told the Australian Financial Review that "The social licence is an issue, but the science and technology is not." He has also stated that there are likely to be synergies between unconventional gas and waste storage interests in the future, possibly building upon synroc technology.

In 2015, he was elected a fellow of the Royal Society of New South Wales and was called before the Nuclear Fuel Cycle Royal Commission in South Australia as an expert witness. He spoke on the topic of Nuclear Education and Skills Development.

He was presented with a Doctor of Science (honoris causa) by the University of Wollongong in 2017.

Paterson was appointed a Member of the Order of Australia in the 2026 Australia Day Honours for "significant service to the judiciary, and to the law".
