= 2026 Australia Day Honours =

Annual honours list

The 2026 Australia Day Honours are appointments to various orders and honours to recognise and reward good works by Australian citizens. The list was announced on 26 January 2026 by the Governor General of Australia, Sam Mostyn.

The Australia Day Honours are the first of the two major annual honours lists, the first announced to coincide with Australia Day (26 January), with the other being the King's Birthday Honours, which are announced on the second Monday in June.

== Order of Australia ==
Order of Australia civil ribbon

Order of Australia military ribbon

=== Companion of the Order of Australia (AC) ===
==== General Division ====
- Emeritus Professor Bruce Konrad Armstrong, AM – For eminent service to medical research, to environmental and genetic cancer epidemiology, to screening service development, to academia, and to public health administration.
- The Honourable Chief Justice Andrew Scott Bell, SC – For eminent service to the judiciary and to the law, to legal education and training, and to the arts as an administrator and benefactor.
- Professor Peter John Cook, CBE – For eminent service to science as an innovator, pioneer and international expert in the development of carbon capture and storage, to policy development, and to climate change mitigation.
- The Honourable Mathias Cormann – For eminent service to the people and Parliament of Australia, to the implementation of government reform, to multilateral affairs, and to international economic development.
- Paula Grace Fox, AO – For eminent service to the arts, to medical research, and to children and youth, through philanthropic giving, fundraising and governance.
- Catherine Astrid Freeman, OAM – For eminent service to athletics as an international competitor and ambassador, to positive social impact across the community, to the reconciliation movement in the spirit of unity and inclusion, and as a role model to youth.
- Professor Anne Kelso, AO – For eminent service to health and medical research sciences and administration, to Australian influenza preparedness, and to gender equity.
- The Honourable Chief Justice Christopher John Kourakis – For eminent service to the judiciary, to the law and to legal reform, to social justice and gender equity, to the Greek community, and to education.
- The Honourable Annastacia Palaszczuk – For eminent service to the people and Parliament of Queensland, particularly as Premier, to educational equity, to multiculturalism, and to public health.
- Scientia Professor Michelle Yvonne Simmons, AO – For eminent service to quantum physics and nanotechnology research, to atomic-scale engineering, to technology innovation and commercialisation, and to STEM education.

=== Officer of the Order of Australia (AO) ===
==== General Division ====
- Professor Eliathamby Ambikairajah – For distinguished service to tertiary education and research, to electrical engineering, to technology innovation, and to the Sri Lankan community of Australia.
- Mark Charles Armstrong – For distinguished service to media and communications law, to the development of public policy and regulation, and as an academic.
- Professor Philip Alan Bland – For distinguished service to planetary and space science, to primitive meteorite research, to understanding the impact of asteroids and comets, and to tertiary education.
- Professor Jeffrey Ian Borland – For distinguished service to business as a labour market economist, to tertiary education, to microeconomic research, and to public policy development.
- Graham John Bradley, AM – For distinguished service to corporate governance, to arts leadership, and to sport and education.
- Dr Michele Denise Bruniges – For distinguished service to public administration, to education policy and teaching practice, and to addressing educational disadvantage.
- Dr Michael Francis Buckley – For distinguished service to human genomic medicine, to genetic pathology, and to research, education and training.
- Professor Anne Elizabeth Buist – For distinguished service to psychiatry, to advancing best practice in perinatal mental health research and treatment, and to mental health education.
- Anthony Ray Burgess – For distinguished service to business, to tertiary education, to philanthropic corporate governance and benefaction, and to the arts.
- Professor John Cannon – For distinguished service to tertiary education, to mathematical computation, to cryptography, and to the development of algebraic software systems.
- Dr Michael Robert Carr-Gregg – For distinguished service to child and adolescent psychology, to policy reform as an advocate and advisor, to youth cyber safety, and to the community.
- Associate Professor David Romney Dossetor – For distinguished service to psychiatry, particularly neurodevelopmental mental health in children and adolescents, and to paediatric clinician education.
- Jocelyn Kathleen Edna Elliott – For distinguished service to international relations through humanitarian medical care in remote regions of Burkina Faso.
- Dr Kenneth Arthur Elliott – For distinguished service to international relations through humanitarian medical care in remote regions of Burkina Faso.
- Dr David Forbes – For distinguished service to mental health research and practice, to the prevention and treatment of posttraumatic stress disorder, and to academia.
- Carolyn Patricia Frohmader – For distinguished service to people with disability, particularly women and girls, and to social welfare policy development and law reform.
- Professor Robyn Daneale Gallagher – For distinguished service to nursing academia, to cardiovascular health and disease prevention research, to rehabilitation, and to tertiary education.
- Emeritus Professor Marcus Tilbury Hockings – For distinguished service to environmental conservation, to the development of protected area management effectiveness evaluations, and to tertiary education.
- Anne Inkeri Hollonds – For distinguished service to family, children and community safety, wellbeing and human rights, and to policy, research and practice.
- Professor Stephen Marsden Jane – For distinguished service to medical research, to haematology and translational medicine, to advancing access to clinical trials in regional and rural communities, and to tertiary education.
- The Honourable Kristina Kerscher Keneally – For distinguished service to the people and the Parliament of Australia, to the Parliament of New South Wales, particularly as Premier, and to the community.
- Associate Professor Anthony Joseph Lynham – For distinguished service to trauma medicine as an oral and maxillofacial surgeon, to the Parliament of Queensland, and to the community.
- Dr John Manning PSM – For distinguished service to surveying, mapping and geodesy, to research and education, and to international governance roles.
- Timothy Michael Marney – For distinguished service to public administration in Western Australia, to reconciliation, to the not-for-profit sector, and to community mental health.
- The Honourable Steven Spence Marshall – For distinguished service to the people and Parliament of South Australia, to business, to people with disability, and to governance and board positions.
- Rob McInerney – For distinguished service to international road safety and management programs, to infrastructure planning, and to engineering.
- Dr Bruce Moore – For distinguished service to linguistics, to the scholarship of Australian English, to lexicography, to the history of language, and to tertiary education.
- Distinguished Professor Saeid Nahavandi – For distinguished service to tertiary education, to engineering, to robotics and haptics research and innovation, and to defence capability development.
- Bruce William Neill – For distinguished service to the community through philanthropic support, to governance of medical research organisations, to the arts, and to cricket.
- Sharyn Anne O'Neill, PSM – For distinguished service to public administration in Western Australia, to education through executive leadership and teaching, and to disaster management.
- Professor Pascale Genevieve Quester – For distinguished service to tertiary education, to academic administration and leadership, to commerce, and as an author.
- Gerard Thomas Ryan, OAM – For distinguished service to sports governance, to the tourism and hospitality industry, to business, and to the community through philanthropic contributions.
- Penelope Alice Seidler, AM – For distinguished service to the visual arts as an administrator, patron and benefactor, to heritage preservation, to conservation, and to architecture.
- Basil Alfred Darrell Sellers, AM – For distinguished service to the community through philanthropy and leadership, and to sports administration.
- Emeritus Professor Jeffery Thomas Spickett – For distinguished service to tertiary education, to public and occupational health, and to environmental toxicology research.
- Emeritus Professor Virginia Perryman Studdert – For distinguished service to veterinary science, to tertiary education, to animal disease research and comparative medicine.
- Dr Brian Maxwell Tress – For distinguished service to neuroradiology medicine, to interventional and diagnostic radiography, and to the introduction of new imaging technologies in Australia.
- Emeritus Professor John Jay Wanna – For distinguished service to political and policy research, to tertiary education, to democratic innovation, and to the development of public administration frameworks.

=== Member of the Order of Australia (AM) ===
==== General Division ====
- Patricia Elizabeth Akopiantz – For significant service to business and the environment through executive membership and governance roles.
- Dr John Arthur Allan – For significant service to medicine as an obstetrician and gynaecologist, and to women and maternal health.
- Dr Ravinder Raj Anand – For significant service to earth science and mineral resources, to regolith exploration, and to geochemistry.
- Kim Elizabeth Anderson – For significant service to literature, and to the publishing industry.
- Geoffrey Scott Ashton-Jones – For significant service to the environment, to primary industry, and to the community.
- The Honourable Bruce Norman Atkinson – For significant service to the people and Parliament of Victoria, and to the region of Nunawading.
- The late Robert Gowrie Bain – For significant service to the law, and to the legal profession.
- Graeme Rowland Base – For significant service to children's literature as an author and illustrator.
- Associate Professor Robert Joseph Bauze – For significant service to orthopaedics and trauma care as a clinician and administrator.
- Dr Colin Glenn Begley – For significant service to haematology and oncology medicine, and to research.
- Emeritus Professor Christopher Raymond Bellenger – For significant service to veterinary science, to tertiary education, and to the Anglican Church of Australia.
- The Honourable Geoffrey John Bellew, SC – For significant service to the judiciary and the law, to the legal profession, and to rugby league.
- Michael John Betts – For significant service to the community of Geelong.
- Cecil Albert Black – For significant service to local government, to the legal profession, and to the community.
- Robert Blair – For significant service to the Indigenous community of Queensland.
- Noor Blumer – For significant service to the law, to the legal profession, and to the community.
- The late Leith Ester Boully – For significant service to conservation and the environment.
- Anthony Vincent Brown, PSM – For significant service to the museums and galleries sector.
- Professor Caitlin Riley Byrne – For significant service to business education, and to international relations.
- The Honourable Ian Gordon Campbell – For significant service to the people and Parliament of Australia.
- Maile Katherine Carnegie – For significant service to corporate administration in senior executive roles, and to governance and advisory positions.
- Professor Mark Cassidy – For service to geotechnical science, to engineering, and to academia.
- David Reginald Chandler, OAM – For significant service to the building and construction industry.
- Emeritus Professor Colin Burton Chapman – For significant service to pharmacy and pharmaceutical science research, education and practice.
- Gwen Marie Cherne – For significant service to veterans and families.
- Sandra Chipchase – For significant service to the major event and tourism industry.
- Justine Mary Clark – For significant service to architecture in a range of appointments.
- Kathleen Margaret Collett – For significant service to medicine in the field of radiology as clinician and administrator.
- Professor Shaun Patrick Collin – For significant service to tertiary education, to ecology, and to agricultural research.
- Leslie Charles Collins – For significant service to Indigenous health in Queensland.
- Maxwell James Connery, OAM – For significant service to social welfare, and to choral music.
- John Dens Connolly – For significant service to rugby union as coach and mentor.
- Phillip Brian Cooper – For significant service to the Indigenous community of Victoria in a range of roles.
- Andrea Coote – For significant service to the people and Parliament of Victoria, and to the aged care sector.
- Bruce Campbell Cowley – For significant service to business, to the law, and to tertiary education.
- Maryjane Crabtree – For significant service to the legal profession, to community health, and to sport.
- Paul McLeod Cross – For significant service to the arts, and to secondary education.
- Geoffrey Noel Davidson – For significant service to sailing as a competitor and administrator.
- Caitlin Anne Delaney – For significant service to cancer advocacy, care, research and awareness, and to embryology.
- Anne Dennis – For significant service to the Indigenous community of New South Wales.
- Terence James Doherty – For significant service to basketball in administrative and referee education roles.
- Emeritus Professor Roderick Alastair Drew – For significant service to horticulture research, and to agricultural development.
- Toni Anne Dwyer – For significant service to business and commerce, and to tertiary education.
- Paul Raymond Ebert – For significant service to rowing, and to the church.
- Carol Rose Edds – For significant service to the construction industry, and to heritage conservation.
- Dr Ronald Frederick Edwards – For significant service to the environment, and to the community.
- The Late Norman Abraham Faifer – For significant service to the building and construction industry, and to the community.
- Sylvia Falzon – For significant service to community health, to corporate governance, and to the museums and finance sectors.
- Andrew Craig Fielke – For significant service to the food industry, particularly as a chef developing Australian native cuisine.
- Alan Douglas Finch – For significant service to higher education, through the design and implementation of models of governance.
- Robert Imrie Fitzpatrick – For significant service to plastic and reconstructive surgery, and to the community of Western Australia.
- Peter Lawrence Flynn – For significant service to community mental health, as an administrator, patron and donor.
- Desmond Harold Freeman – For significant service to interior design, and to vocational education.
- Elizabeth Annette Gilfillan – For significant service to the community through a range of organisations.
- David Brett Gole – For significant service to architecture, and to heritage conservation.
- Dr Debra Ann Gook – For significant service to women's health, and to reproductive biology and fertility as a clinician and researcher.
- Dorothy Anne Gordon – For significant service to cricket as player, selector and administrator.
- Bruce Charles Gosper – For significant service to public administration, particularly international policy and trade.
- Sam Gowegati – For significant service to the Indigenous youth of Western Australia.
- Peter Charles Grey – For significant service to public administration, to international trade, and to business.
- Emeritus Professor Debra Lee Griffiths – For significant service to nursing, and to medico-legal education.
- Rachael Margaret Grinham – For significant service to squash as an athlete and administrator.
- Gail Iris Hambly – For significant service to the media and communications sector, to the arts, and to the legal profession.
- Bill Yidumduma Harney – For significant service to the Indigenous community of the Northern Territory, and to the arts.
- Yvonne Daphne Henderson – For significant service to the people and Parliament of Western Australia, and to women.
- Dr Warren John Henry – For significant service to veterinary science, and to global humanitarian programs.
- Grahame Hill – For significant service to air sports governance and safety.
- Dr Sarah Louise Hill – For significant service to public administration, to urban planning, and to public policy.
- The late Robert George Hirst – For significant service to the performing arts through music.
- Kim Maree Hobbs – For significant service to community health, and to gynaecological oncology.
- Jennifer Holmes – For significant service to community health through alcohol and drug use prevention and treatment initiatives.
- The late Professor Peter William Holmes – For significant service to medicine as a respiratory physician, clinician and teacher.
- Dr Sophie Bilicki Holmes – For significant service to mental health, to family therapy, and to people with disability.
- Dr Michael Jeffrey Hooper – For significant service to endocrinology, and to biomedical musculoskeletal research.
- Tanya Louise Hosch – For significant service to the community through social policy, and as an advocate for diversity and inclusion.
- Dr Susan Jacobs – For significant service to women's health in the fields of obstetrics and gynaecology.
- Barry William Janes – For significant service to the arts, and to philanthropic initiatives.
- Professor Shirley Jane Jansen – For significant service to vascular surgery as a clinician and researcher.
- The Honourable Peter Lind Johnstone – For significant service to the law and to the judiciary, to legal standards, and to indigenous youth.
- Michael Andrew Katz – For significant service to the arts, to business governance, and to the community.
- Janette Kendall – For significant service to business, to the arts, to the marketing sector, and to the community.
- Dr Anne Mary Kennedy – For significant service to early childhood education, and to the community.
- Professor Ian Kerridge – For significant service to ethics research and training, and as a clinician and author.
- The Honourable David Kirby, KC – For significant service to the judiciary, and to the law.
- Dr Paul David Kremer – For significant service to the built environment.
- Roger James Lang – For significant service to the community through charitable organisations.
- William David Lark – For significant service to the whiskey distilling industry.
- Emeritus Professor Nicolette Delphine Lee – For significant service to tertiary education, and to curricula policy and practice development.
- Floyd Cecil Leedie – For significant service to Indigenous health in Queensland.
- Dr Barry Denison Lewis – For significant service to biochemical paediatrics and genetics.
- Professor Stephen Chiu Ho Li – For significant service to multicultural community health, to public pathology, and to the community.
- Conjoint Professor Nicholas Lintzeris – For significant service as a clinical researcher in addiction medicine.
- The Honourable Justice John Alexander Logan, RFD, SC – For significant service to the judiciary and to the law.
- Distinguished Professor Dr James Raymond Macnamara – For significant service to tertiary education, to communications research, and to public relations.
- Farah Percy Madon – For significant service to architecture, and to people with disability.
- Professor Nicholas Manolios – For significant service to medicine in the field of immunology and rheumatic diseases.
- Cedric Hamilton Mason – For significant service to tennis as a player, coach and administrator.
- The late Robert Frank McCotter – For significant service to conservation and the environment, to local government, and to the community.
- The late Jack McCoy – For significant service to surf cinematography.
- Dr Bruce Allan McGregor – For significant service to conservation and environment, in a range of roles.
- John McDonald McLaren – For significant service to the community through a range of organisations.
- Professor Ruth Elizabeth McPhail – For significant service to tertiary education, and to the arts.
- The late Dr Nicholas Andrew Medland – For significant service to sexual health medicine as a physician, clinical epidemiologist and general practitioner.
- Professor Jessica Jane Meeuwig – For significant service to marine conservation and research.
- Nicolas George Mersiades – For significant service to aged welfare.
- Dr Gillian Eileen Miles – For significant service to the transport and infrastructure sectors.
- Elizabeth Maria Montano – For significant service to public administration, particularly in law enforcement, regulation and governance.
- Commissioner Dominic Paul Morgan, ASM – For significant service to the community through emergency response governance and leadership.
- George Benjamin Newhouse – For significant service to the law, to the legal profession, and to the community.
- Professor Robert Usher Newton – For significant service to exercise medicine, to cancer research, and to the community.
- Professor John Marshall O'Donnell – For significant service to orthopaedics as a clinician and mentor.
- Dr Adrian Walter Paterson – For significant service to science in the field of nuclear technology.
- Sonia Petering – For significant service to the law, and to the finance and business sectors.
- Professor Neil Brenton Piller – For significant service to lymphology as a clinician and academic.
- Adrian Pisarski – For significant service to the community through social welfare organisations.
- Dr Leon Pitchon – For significant service to medicine as a plastic surgeon, and to the arts through philanthropy.
- The late Stuart Arthur Pittendrigh – For significant service to horticulture, and to landscape architecture.
- Emeritus Professor Prem Ramburuth – For significant service to tertiary education, particularly through international partnerships.
- Mary Reemst – For significant service to the banking sector, and to social welfare organisations.
- Christopher John Robison – For significant service to the law, to the legal profession, and to the community.
- Professor John Colin Rolfe – For significant service to regional economic development as an economist and author.
- Dipak Sanghvi – For significant service to community health through governance and board roles.
- Dr Kunwarjit Singh Sangla – For significant service to endocrinology, and to the rural and Indigenous communities of Queensland.
- Angela Silvana Scaffidi – For significant service to the community through philanthropic initiatives.
- Brendan Schwab – For significant service to professional sport as a lawyer, and as an advocate for athlete's rights.
- Paul Darren Scurrah – For significant service to the transport, logistics and freight industry.
- Professor Andrew Paul Sindone – For significant service to cardiology, and to cardiovascular disease research.
- Professor Loane Lovat Skene – For significant service to the law, and to bioethics and medical research regulation.
- Graham Spencer-Laitt – For significant service to the community of Western Australia through philanthropic governance and benefaction.
- Professor Gwidon Wladyslaw Stachowiak – For significant service to science and engineering, and to tribology research and education.
- Air Vice-Marshal Margaret Mary Staib, AM, CSC – For significant service to business, to the aviation sector, and to the freight and logistics industry.
- Dr Robin Grant Stanley – For significant service to veterinary ophthalmology, and to tertiary and vocational education.
- Dr Fiona Elder Stewart – For significant service to anatomy as a surgical clinician, researcher and educator, as an academic, and to the community.
- Dr Robert George Stirling – For significant service to respiratory oncology as a clinician and educator, and to research.
- Dr Rodney Clement Straw – For significant service to veterinary surgical oncology, and to tertiary education.
- Richard Edwin Stringer – For significant service to architectural photography, to education, and to history.
- John David Susman – For significant service to the hospitality industry, and to the seafood sector.
- Dr Joseph Chun Ming Tam – For significant service to paediatric medicine, and to rural health.
- Geoffrey Colin Tattersall – For significant service to veterans, and to community health.
- Paul Christopher Taylor – For significant service to the arts and education through governance and philanthropic roles.
- The late Gene Thomas Tilbrook – For significant service to business, and to the arts.
- Kathleen Margaret Toko – For significant service to mental health governance and awareness.
- Dr Thomas Nathaniel Tseng – For significant service to dentistry.
- Fredericus Antonius Van Dongen – For significant service to basketball as a coach and administrator.
- The Honourable Terrence Keith Waldron – For significant service to the Parliament of Western Australia, to regional and rural communities, and to sport.
- The Honourable Justice Kristen Louise Walker, KC – For significant service to the law and the judiciary, and to legal education.
- Kylie Walker – For significant service to scientific communication and advocacy.
- Professor Wei Wang – For significant service to predictive and personalised medicine as a researcher and academic.
- John Ellis Western – For significant service to surf lifesaving.
- Emeritus Professor Marcus Ramsay Wigan – For significant service to engineering, to road safety, and to tertiary education.
- Melanie Victoria Rose Willis – For significant service to the finance, banking, and insurance sectors.
- Deidre Ellen Willmott – For significant service to business, and to the Parliament of Western Australia.
- Dr Andrew Pilcher Wines – For significant service to orthopaedic surgery, and to the community.
- Roma Yibiyung Winmar – For significant service to the Indigenous communities of Western Australia, to the arts, and to education.
- John Stanley Womersley, OAM – For service to archery as an officiator and administrator.
- Kelly Wren – For significant service to tennis, to basketball, and to athletes with an intellectual disability.
- Emeritus Professor Dianne Gaye Wynaden – For significant service to academic and clinical mental health nursing.
- Professor Minghao Zheng – For significant service to orthopaedic research and regenerative medicine.

General Division – Honorary

- Anita Geraldine Bourke – For significant service to the community, and to radiology.
- James Charles Richards – For significant service to motor sports as a team owner and driver.

==== Military Division ====
Navy

- Commodore Stephen Geoffrey Dalton, RAN – For exceptional service in submarine and undersea warfare capability development.
- Commodore Nathan Jerome Robb, RAN – For exceptional service to the Royal Australian Navy in the field of Maritime Logistics.
- Rear Admiral Brett Raymond Sonter, RAN – For exceptional performance of duty in senior Australian Defence Force management and international relationship roles.

Army

- Colonel Mark Andrew Coyle – For exceptional service as the Commander Australian Contingent on Operation ASLAN in 2020 and Operation OKRA in 2024.
- Brigadier Nathan Edward Juchniewicz, DSC and Bar, CSC – For exceptional service in senior command appointments in Forces Command and Special Operations Command.
- Brigadier M – For exceptional service to the coordination and application of Army's operational capability as the Director of Special Operations and Plans and Director General Land Operations.

Air Force

- Air Commodore Maria Josefina Brick – For exceptional service to the Royal Australian Air Force in military legal services and staff appointments.
- Group Captain Aleisha Maree Broadhead – For exceptional service to the Australian Defence Force in the introduction of the F-35A Lightning II and the sustainment of air traffic management capabilities.
- Squadron Leader Andrew Gordon Harris – For exceptional service to the Royal Australian Air Force in the enhancement and employment of air combat capabilities including platforms, people and procedures.
- Wing Commander Nadia Justine Harrison, CSM – For exceptional service in development and realisation of expeditionary cyberspace provisioning capabilities for the Royal Australian Air Force.

=== Medal of the Order of Australia (OAM) ===
==== General Division ====
- Gary Noel Adams – For service to sport, and to the community.
- Francis Henry Ahmat – For service to the Indigenous community, and to Australian rules football.
- Douglas Harry Ahola – For service to the community of Port Pirie.
- John McDonald Ainsworth – For service to local government, and to the community of the Nambucca Valley.
- The late John Alexander – For service to the Indigenous community of Western Australia.
- Dale Victor Allchin – For service to the community of Port Melbourne.
- Michael Richard Allen, PSM – For service to the community through a range of organisations.
- Kerry John Ambrose-Pearce – For service to the community of the Northern Territory.
- Dr Lainie Lee Anderson – For service to community history.
- Lyn Judith Anderson – For service to community health.
- Janina Archabuz – For service to the Polish community of Brimbank.
- The late Dr Christopher John Armitage – For service to the judiciary, and to the church.
- Albert Armstrong – For service to squash.
- Philip Alan Armstrong – For service to the community through a range of organisations.
- Laurience Roger Ashcroft – For service to the community of Parkes.
- Chinthaka Indunil Samaraweera Atukorala – For service to the multicultural community of the Shepparton District.
- Elizabeth Anne Aylett – For service to netball.
- William John Baker – For service to the community of Queanbeyan.
- Virginia Hope Balmain – For service to the community, and to youth.
- Neil Graham Barker – For service to the wholesale fresh produce sector.
- Lynda Jane Barry – For service to lifesaving and lifeguard training, and to the community.
- Patricia Ann Barry – For service to life saving, and to the community of the Sunshine Coast.
- Caroline Lindsey Bartlett – For service to public administration.
- Nunziata Basile – For service to seniors.
- Elizabeth Bate – For service to the community of Lara.
- Vivian Martin Beaumont – For service to the community through a range of roles.
- The late William Benbow – For service to the community through a range of organisations.
- Athol Reginald Bennett – For service to the community of the Southern Midlands.
- Michael Theodore Bennett – For service to local government, and to the community of Eaton.
- Roxanne Elizabeth Bennett – For service to the community of Geelong.
- The late Mark Berkovich, RFD – For service to the community through a range of organisations.
- Michael James Berry – For service to the community of Dunoon.
- Dr James Peter Berryman – For service to medicine as a general practitioner.
- Garry Lawrence Beven – For service to the community through a range of roles.
- John Richard Bicknell – For service to the community though a range of organisations.
- Gregory Raymond Biddle – For service to the community through emergency response organisations.
- Paul Jonathon Birch – For service to the community through a range of roles.
- Rodney Keith Birch – For service to the grains industry.
- Benjamin Douglas Bjarnesen, BM – For service to LGBTIQ+ communities of Queensland, and to the domestic and family violence sector.
- Sylvia Janyce Black – For service to community history.
- Richard William Blackman – For service to the community of Coonabarabran.
- David Blakeley – For service to community health.
- Aunty Helen Belle Bnads – For service to the Indigenous community of Melbourne.
- Shaun Keith Bonett – For service to the community through a range of organisations.
- Neville Bruce Bonney – For service to conservation and the environment, and to the community.
- Robert Bontschek – For service to the Jewish community of Melbourne, and to the media.
- Patrick Charles Bourke – For service to the community through public speaking coaching.
- Deborah Ann Brassey – For service to the community of Pacific Palms.
- Jack Brook – For service to community history.
- Judith Brooke – For service to the community of Bathurst.
- Dr Andrew Michael Brostek – For service to dentistry.
- Kenneth Charles Brown – For service to media, and to the community.
- Rita Bente Brown – For service to community health.
- Maree Gwendoline Browne – For service to tertiary education.
- William James Bruns – For service to the communities of Cohuna and Leitchville.
- Dr Victor Paul Buccheri – For service to the Italian community of Melbourne.
- Professor Shane Peter Bullock – For service to community health.
- Allen Daniel Burns – For service to the community through emergency response organisations.
- Robert Blair Bush – For service to the community through a range of roles.
- The late James Edward Butt – For services to veterans and their families.
- Clinical Professor Lesley Ann Cala – For service to tertiary education.
- Antonio Daniele Calabro – For service to the bus transport industry.
- The late Giuseppe Benito Calabro – For service to the bus transport industry.
- Satwant Singh Calais – For service to the Sikh community.
- Jillian Fay Cameron – For service to early childhood education.
- Dr Kevin John Cameron – For service to music, and to education.
- Dr Gordon Robert Campbell – For service to obstetrics and gynaecology.
- Keith Malcolm Campbell – For service to local government, and to the community of South Burnett.
- Ann Cicely Caro – For service to education.
- Patrizia Lucia Cassaniti – For service to workplace safety.
- The late Janice Margaret Cattle – For service to the community of West Wyalong.
- Dr Roberto Celada – For service to medicine as a general practitioner.
- James Christopher Child – For service to local government, and to the community of the Yarra Ranges.
- Jan Childs – For service to the community of Berowra.
- Antonio Cipriano – For service to youth through Scouts.
- Barry Chamberlain Clark – For service to history preservation, and to the community of Bribie Island.
- Beverley Anne Clarke – For service to the performing arts through administrative roles.
- Martin John Clarke – For service to basketball.
- Alan David Clayton – For service to conservation and the environment, and to the community.
- Reginald Gordon Cleland – For service to equestrian sports.
- Dr Peter Roy Clements – For service to conservation and the environment, and to medical science.
- Phillip Leigh Clifford – For service to the community of Maffra.
- Charlie Cobb – For service to the community of the Sunshine Coast.
- Francis Raymond Cole – For service to veterans.
- David Peter Coleman – For service to the community of Tasmania, and to the arts.
- Matthew John Coleman – For service to the agricultural show sector.
- Kay Collas – For service to the Anglican Church of Australia, and to education.
- Peter John Collings – For service to the communities of Narrabeen and Mona Vale.
- Janice Lynette Collingwood – For service to community history, and to the arts.
- Christopher Noel Colvin – For service to veterans and their families.
- Carol Ann Cope – For service to youth through Scouts.
- Petros Christos Copulos – For service to the community through charitable organisations.
- Anthony John Cox – For service to the welfare of veterans.
- Kerin Jayne Cox – For service to the community through a range of organisations.
- The Reverend Dr Vernon John Cracknell – For service to youth through Scouts.
- Paul Marcus Crake – For service to people with disability.
- Lieutenant Colonel Robert James Cramp – For service to the sport of shooting, and to the community.
- Robert Barry Cranston – For service to the arts.
- Wendy Suzanne Crellin – For service to the community through a range of organisations.
- Paul Laurence Crennan – For service to the law, and to community of Bathurst.
- Carolyn Claire Creswell – For service to the food industry as an entrepreneur.
- Marcus Paul Crook – For service to the community through the not-for-profit sector.
- Major Don McDonald Cruden – For service to veterans.
- Steven Andrew Curtis – For service to the Jewish community of Melbourne.
- Alex Leslie Dafner – For service to the Jewish community of Melbourne.
- James Elsden Danskin – For service to veterans and their families.
- Shyam Ratan Das – For service to the Indian community of Queensland.
- Colleen Maree Davis – For service to the community of Wangaratta.
- Dr Stephen Leslie Davis – For service to international relations, and to the Indigenous community of the Northern Territory.
- Alexander Sinclair Dawson – For service to golf, and to the community.
- Stephen Mark Day – For service to charitable organisations, and to the finance sector.
- Alexander Francis Del Porto – For service to local government, and to the community of Bayside.
- Craig Charles Delaney – For service to public administration, and to veterans.
- David Joseph Denver – For service to the Jewish community of Western Australia.
- The late Graham Sydney Dickinson – For service to the community of Gisborne.
- Aunty Aileen Dippel – For service to the Indigenous community of Queensland.
- John Christopher Dodman – For service to the community of Western Australia.
- Megan Donnelly – For service to nursing, and to women.
- Richard Alan Dougan – For service to the community through a range of organisations.
- Roger John Downs – For service to the community of the Illawarra Region.
- Ernest William Drew – For service to people with disability.
- Terezka Drnzik – For service to Middle Eastern dance as a teacher.
- Professor Matthew Desmond Dun – For service to haematology and oncology research.
- The late Walter Hughes Duncan – For service to horticulture.
- Jeremy Steven Dunkel – For service to the Jewish community of Sydney.
- Kenneth Robert Dunlop – For service to professional wrestling.
- Terence Dunn – For service to community sport.
- Margaret Anne Dymond – For service to motorsports.
- Peter David Edgar – For service to the community of Cobram.
- Bruce Bertram Edwards – For service to the community through a range of organisations.
- Robert James Edwards – For service to the community.
- Jean Mekhael El Kfoury – For service to Taekwondo.
- John Alex Elliott – For service to the community of Wilcannia.
- William Wardrew Ellis – For service to the community through emergency response organisations.
- Ramzi Elsayed – For service to the Islamic community of Victoria.
- Marcus William Elsum – For service to the finance sector, and to the community.
- George Andrew Ermer – For service to the community through a range of organisations.
- Graham Richard Etherington – For service to the performing arts as an entertainer.
- Kerry David Evans – For service to the Christian community of Nambour.
- William John Faahan-Smith – For service to the community through emergency response organisations.
- Barry George Fagg – For service to charitable organisations, and to the community of Geelong.
- Alister Colin Ferguson – For service to the Indigenous community of Bourke.
- The late Raymond Henry Fien – For service to surf lifesaving.
- Barry Leigh Fitzgerald – For service to the community through charitable organisations.
- David Booth Fitzsimons – For service to community social welfare, and to youth.
- Ezzard Flowers – For service to the Indigenous community of Western Australia.
- Roger Francis Flynn – For service to squash.
- Gavin Ashley Foenander – For service to cricket.
- The late David William Folley – For service to sport as an official and administrator.
- Tat Yin Fong – For service to the Chinese community of the Gold Coast.
- Gavin David Fry – For service to the arts.
- Norman John Fry – For service to veterans, and to the community.
- Colleen Honor Fuller – For service to the community through a range of organisations.
- Apostolos Gaganis – For service to the community, and to the Australian food industry.
- Malcolm John Gardiner – For service to environmental conservation, and to the community.
- Cathy Gault – For service to community social welfare.
- Arthur James German – For service to the community of Cobram.
- Kenneth John Gibbons – For service to community cinema.
- Catherine Jean Giunta – For service to the community through charitable organisations.
- The Honourable Anthony Graham – For service to the judiciary, and to legal education.
- Dr Gillian Sian Graham – For service to community history.
- Dr William Douglas Gransbury – For service to the community of Angaston.
- Bruce Leslie Green – For service to local government, and to the community of Port Lincoln.
- Rodney James Green – For service to the community of Rockhampton.
- Benjamin James Gregory – For service to rugby union.
- Paul Orlando Griffin – For service to industrial relations through the trade union sector.
- John Lionel Griffith – For service to primary industry.
- John Hahn – For service to surf lifesaving, and to the community of Forster-Tuncurry.
- William John Hahn – For service to netball.
- Hon Raymond James Halligan – For service to the people and Parliament of Western Australia.
- Derrick Hammon – For service to the community of Canberra.
- Luke Christopher Harding – For service to the community through a range of organisations.
- Dr Brian Charles Harper – For service to engineering.
- Scott Douglas Harris – For service to veterans and their families.
- Colin David Hassell – For service to the promotion of water safety and drowning prevention.
- Ruth Lorraine Havrlant – For service to netball.
- The late David Andrew Heard – For service to community radio.
- Dr David John Heilbronn – For service to the community through a range of organisations.
- Rosamund Lesley Heit – For service to the community through a range of organisations.
- Paul Gerard Hennessy – For service to youth, and to the community.
- Dr Bronwyn Eunice Herbert – For service to youth social welfare.
- Janette Joyce Heron – For service to women's hockey.
- Leon Pierre Herviou – For service to the community through charitable organisations.
- Robert Murray Higgins – For service to billiards and snooker, and to the community.
- Graham Leon Hill – For service to youth, and to vocational education.
- Catherine Anne Hindson – For service to community health.
- Felix Ho Lam Ho, ASM – For service to community health.
- Katina Hodson-Thomas – For service to the people and Parliament of Western Australia.
- Penelope Cathcart Holden – For service to community history.
- Mark Christopher Holdsworth – For service to conservation and the environment, and to ornithology.
- John Winston Hollis – For service to the community of Bathurst.
- Deborah Margaret Holmes – For service to community social welfare.
- Ian Scott Holmes – For service to football.
- Casey Holmes Akemarr – For service to the Indigenous community of the Northern Territory.
- Frankie Holmes Akemarr – For service to the Indigenous community of the Northern Territory.
- Neville John Holz – For service to horse sports, and to the community.
- Dr Matilda Ann House-Williams – For service to the Indigenous communities of the Canberra region.
- The late Dennis Michael Howe – For service to the agricultural industry, and to the community.
- Bronwyn Joy Howes – For service to primary education.
- Mark Terrence Hughes – For service to the community through charitable initiatives.
- Raymond Bruce Hughston – For service to the community of Wanaaring.
- Eliza Rachel Hull – For service to people with disability, and to the arts.
- Kenneth Neil Hutt – For service to the community through a range of roles.
- The late Norman Donald Hutton – For service to the community through charitable organisations.
- Omer Riza Incekara – For service to the Turkish community of Australia, and to multiculturalism.
- Johannes (John) Maria Iriks – For service to the community of Kwinana.
- Michel Daniel Itel – For service to community health.
- Sybil Milliner Jack-Ungar – For service to tertiary education.
- Edgar Leonard Jackson – For service to aged welfare, and to the community of Cessnock.
- Professor Annamarie Rustom Jagose – For service to tertiary education.
- David John Jarman – For service to history preservation, and to the community of Marion.
- Philip Anthony Jenkinson – For service to sailing, and to junior rugby league.
- Dr Rondhir Jithoo – For service to neurosurgery.
- Phillip Michael Johnson – For service to the community through a range of roles.
- Graham Keith Johnston – For service to the environment, and to the community of MacMasters Beach.
- The late Penelope Jones – For service to medicine, particularly to spleen research.
- Viola Kalokerinos – For service to the community of Canberra.
- Mohammad Kamruzzaman – For service to the arts, and to the Bengali community of Melbourne.
- Zoe Nanuma Kean – For service to science journalism.
- Brian Francis Keane – For service to the community through a range of organisations.
- Anthony Sean Keating – For service to the community through a range of organisations.
- Ian Lindsay Kellett – For service to veterans, and to the community through a range of roles.
- Barry Edward Kelly – For service to veterans and their families.
- Michael Patrick Kelly – For service to seafarers' welfare, and to the maritime transport industry.
- Frances Helen Kendall – For service to music, and to the performing arts.
- Maurice Joseph Kensell – For service to the Jewish community, and to history preservation.
- Patrick James Kerrigan – For service to the community of the Snowy Monaro region.
- Frederick Ross Kersley – For service to horse racing.
- Charles Edward Khan – For service to the community of Dimbulah.
- Emeritus Professor Shahjahan Khan – For service to the Islamic community of Australia.
- Tausif Khan – For service to the Indian community of Brisbane.
- John Gordon Killick – For service to the community of Galong.
- Jeffrey David King – For service to music.
- Jennifer Irene King – For service to youth through Scouts.
- Katherine King – For service to nursing and midwifery.
- Ronald Eric King – For service to music.
- Stephen Thomas King – For service to the visual arts as a sculptor.
- Robert Henry Kirby – For service to the community of Sydney.
- Dr Geoff Knight – For service to paediatric medicine.
- Wen Yao Ko – For service to the Taiwanese community of Brisbane.
- Debra Korman – For service to the community through a range of organisations.
- Dr Andrew Yiu-Man Kwong – For service to general practice medicine.
- John Anthony Lackey – For service to the community of Penrith.
- Cuc Thi Lam, PSM – For service to the community of Maribyrnong.
- Robert William Lambourn – For service to basketball as an official.
- Dr Nancy Diane Lane – For service to tertiary education.
- Andrew Leigh Langford-Jones – For service to golf.
- Richard Brian Lawysz – For service to athletics as an official and administrator.
- Trung Dzung Le – For service to the beauty industry, and to the Vietnamese community.
- Major Neil Robert Leckie, RFD – For service to veterans, and to the community through a range of roles.
- Lorraine Patricia Ledwell – For service to community health, and to breast cancer awareness.
- Dr Roger Vernon Lee – For service to history preservation.
- Mun Han Regina Leung-Huning – For service to the community of Whittlesea.
- Norman James Lewis – For service to the community through charitable organisations.
- Robert Malcolm Lewis – For service to the community of the New England region.
- Rex Liebelt – For service to the agricultural show sector.
- Paul Kenneth Litherland – For service to youth through cyber-safety education and awareness raising.
- Donald Arthur Lockley – For service to community of the Northern Territory.
- Rhys Hollington London – For service to the community of Wynyard.
- Harold George Long – For service to the communities of Mannum, Salt Creek and Padthaway, and to youth.
- Robert Henry Lorschy – For service to community through a range of organisations.
- Kathleen Mavourneen Lovelock – For service to the beef cattle industry.
- Nena (Betty) Aileen Loxton – For service to the community through charitable initiatives.
- Julian Michael Lucas – For service to people who are deaf or hard of hearing.
- Maxwell James Luff – For service to the road transport industry, and to the community.
- Daniel Bernard Lustig – For service to the community through a range of roles.
- Ian Norman Mackay – For service to the community of the Illawarra.
- Diane Marlyce Mackrell – For service to the community of the Strathbogie region.
- Kenneth John Madsen – For service to basketball.
- The late Martha Magajna – For service to the Slovenian community of Sydney.
- Dr Edmund Stuart Marel – For service to orthopaedic medicine.
- John Marrapodi, PSM – For service to Australian rules football as an umpire.
- Cathy Anne Mason – For service to the community through a range of roles.
- Margaret Elizabeth McArthur – For service to the community of Mornington Peninsula.
- The late Arthur Edward McCarthy – For service to the community through a range of organisations.
- Diane Beatrice McDonald – For service to the community through social welfare organisations.
- The late John Edward McGrath – For service to surf lifesaving, and to the community.
- Barry James McGuire – For service to the Indigenous community of Western Australia.
- Walter Anthony McGuire – For service to the tourism industry in Western Australia.
- Neil McLeod – For service to the visual arts.
- Barry William Membrey – For service to the community of Albury-Wodonga.
- Dr John Archibald Merson – For service to conservation and the environment.
- Anna Louise Mezger – For service to sports administration, and to people with disability.
- Maxwell John Michell – For service to the rail transport industry.
- Margaret Mickan – For service to the Indigenous communities of the Northern Territory and the Kimberley.
- Renton David Henderson Millar – For service to skateboarding.
- Neville Ray Miller – For service to country music.
- David Millott – For services to cricket.
- David George Milne – For service to the community through a range of organisations.
- Emeritus Professor Elizabeth Hume Minchin – For service to tertiary education.
- Anita Rebecca Mitchell – For service to town planning and urban development.
- Gary Neville Mitchell – For service to community history.
- Martin Hugh Mitchell – For service to community theatre.
- Anthony Rex Morgan – For service to the insurance sector.
- Troy David Morgan – For service to touch football.
- Tony John Morris – For service to the community of Canberra.
- Dr James Arthur Morrison – For service to the Indigenous community of Western Australia.
- George Moscos – For service to the community of North Sydney.
- Thomas William Moss – For service to the community through a range of organisations.
- Dr Jeffrey Douglas Mount – For service to dentistry.
- Danielle Sandra Mulholland – For service to local government, and to the community of Kyogle.
- Monte Hilton Mumford – For service to music education.
- Eli James Murn – For service to road safety advocacy.
- Daniel Joseph Murphy – For service to the building industry, and to the community.
- Leona Christine Murphy – For service to business through governance roles.
- Timothy John Murphy – For service to the construction industry, and to the community.
- Brett Allen Murray – For service to the media, and to motorsports
- Emeritus Professor Chesney Romesh Nagarajah – For service to tertiary education.
- Selliah Nalliah – For service to the Tamil and Hindu communities of Victoria.
- Stanley Nelson – For service to the community of Maryborough.
- Bharat Nepal – For service to the Nepali community of New South Wales, and to mental health.
- Barry Nicholls – For service to sport as a trainer and first aid officer.
- Jane Marie Nigro – For service to community history.
- Michael Patrick Nolan – For service to the community through social welfare organisations.
- The late Reginald Timothy Nolan – For service to horse racing.
- Glenn David Norris – For service to the community through emergency response organisations.
- John Wagih Nour – For service to the Coptic Orthodox Church, and to the Egyptian community.
- Patrick Thomas Nunan, RFD – For service to the community through a range of organisations.
- Kevin Daniel O'Callaghan, ESM – For service to the community of Craigieburn.
- Gerard O'Donnell – For service to the community through a range of organisations.
- Joan Maree O'Keefe – For service to the community through a range of organisations.
- Dr William Joseph O'Malley – For service to baseball, and to public administration.
- The late Michael David O'Rourke – For service to community sport.
- James Trevor O'Shannessy – For service to the community through a range of roles.
- Robert Michael O'Toole – For service to the community through support for survivors of childhood abuse.
- Brett James Odgers – For service to history preservation, to planning, and to the community of Canberra.
- Sally Patricia Odgers – For service to literature.
- Rock Okeefe – For service to the community through a range of organisations.
- Linda Mary Olive – For service to education, and to the Indigenous community of New South Wales.
- Kenneth James Packham – For service to the community through a range of organisations.
- Geoffrey Malcolm Paddick – For service to the community through a range of organisations.
- Robert John Page – For service to community social welfare.
- Peter Leo Papps – For service to the sport of shooting.
- Thomas George Parker – For service to sport as a greenskeeper.
- Lionel Hastings Parrott – For service to the community through a range of roles.
- Kerry George Parsons – For service to the community through a range of organisations.
- Robert George Paterson – For service to the community through a range of organisations.
- Nicholas Alexander Pearce – For service to the community through the not-for-profit sector.
- Graham Richard Peart – For service to the wool industry.
- Robert John Peet – For service to the performing arts.
- Geoffrey Wayne Penny – For service to the communities of Gobur and Terip Terip.
- Terence Gilbert Perry – For service to the community of King Island.
- Hendrik Petrusma – For service to the Parliament of Tasmania, to the real estate industry, and to the community.
- Karen Jane Phillips – For service to women, and to the community of the Gold Coast.
- Tony Pignata – For service to football (soccer).
- Geoffrey James Plante – For service to town planning, and to the community of Townsville.
- Ralph Laurence Plarre – For service to the baking industry.
- Patricia Anne Pledger – For service to children's literature.
- Brett Richard Pollock – For service to the community of Mosman Park, and to men's health.
- Michael Richard Porter – For service to cricket.
- Ann Therese Potter – For service to local government, and to the community of Hume City.
- Charles Leslie Povey – For service to the community through a range of organisations.
- The late Graham Richard Price – For service to the community through a range of organisations.
- Kevin William Quigley – For service to the community through a range of organisations.
- The late William John Quinlan-Watson – For service to the community of Robe.
- Susan Lorraine Rainey – For service to squash.
- The late Joy Enid Ransley-Smith – For service to ballet, and to the performing arts.
- Alison Joyce Ray – For service to the community through charitable organisations.
- Michael John Rayner – For service to the community through a range of roles.
- Adrian Peter Read – For service to gymnastics, and to the community.
- William George Rebula – For service to the community of Geelong.
- Dr Stephanie Owen Reeder – For services to children's literature.
- Inspector Geoffery James Regan, APM – For service to the community through emergency response organisations.
- Charles Conrad Reis – For service to the community in a range of roles and organisations.
- Maurice Alan Renshaw – For service to the pharmaceutical industry.
- Anthony David Rice – For service to people with disability.
- Barry William Richards – For service to the welfare of veterans.
- Mark Tristan Rigby – For service to science as an astronomy and astronautics educator.
- Peter Andrew Roach – For service to the community through a range of organisations.
- Graeme Keith Robb – For service to the community through emergency response organisations.
- Brian Charles Roberts – For service to youth, and to the community.
- Melissa Jane Roberts – For service to swimming.
- Thomas Roberts – For service to veterans and their families.
- Donovan Neil Robertson – For service to engineering.
- Peter Gresley Robertson – For service to conservation and the environment.
- Sebastian Robertson – For service to community health, and to aerial science.
- Gregory John Roese – For service to veterans, and to the community of Tamworth.
- The late Dr Kevin Guyurruyurru Rogers – For service to the Indigenous community of the Northern Territory, and to education.
- Carolyn Ryan – For service to outdoor recreation through a range of roles.
- Daryl James Ryan – For service to veterans and their families.
- Michael Ryan – For service to the community through a range of roles.
- Dr Ravin Sadhai – For service to medicine, and to the community of Bacchus Marsh.
- Joseph Antony Saina – For service to the fresh produce sector, and to horticultural trade.
- Owen James Saleeba – For service to vocational and tertiary education, and to the community.
- Barry William Sammels – For service to the community of Rockingham, and to local government.
- Abigail Joyce Santos Parsons – For service to the community through funding and mentoring programs for students.
- Ross Scarfone – For service to the community through a range of roles.
- Judith Jenny Schiff – For service to the Jewish community of Victoria.
- Travis Schultz – For service to the law, and to the community.
- Brigadier Bruce Andrew Scott, CSC – For service to the sport of rifle shooting, and to the community.
- Peter George Seaman – For service to the community through a range of roles.
- The late Geoffrey Bruce Selig – For service to the community through charitable organisations.
- Zeynep Sertel – For service to the Islamic community of Victoria.
- Frank Thomas Shadforth – For service to the Indigenous youth of the Northern Territory.
- Nancy Mary Sherry – For service to the community through charitable organisations.
- Stephen Walmsley Shrimpton – For service to the performing arts through administrative roles.
- Gordon Murray Simpson – For service to the community of Alexandra.
- Naomi Arlene Simson – For service to business as an entrepreneur, and to leadership.
- Dr Paul Geoffrey Sinclair – For service to conservation, and to cricket.
- Roy Frederick Slade – For service to the Samoan community of Queensland.
- John Slutzkin – For service to the Jewish community of Melbourne, and to hockey.
- William Monteith Smith – For service to the youth of Tasmania.
- The late Jacobus Hubertus Smits – For service to the community of Port Fairy.
- Margaret Rose Snelling – For service to hockey.
- John Barker Spence – For service to sport, and to the community.
- Alen Stajcic – For service to football as a coach.
- Ivan William Standen – For service to the welfare of veterans.
- Stephanie Miranda Stanhope – For service to the community through a range of roles.
- Alan Steen Stevns – For service to literature as an award sponsor.
- Brian Kenneth Stewart – For service to lawn bowls.
- Miriam Anne Stiel – For service to the law, and to the community.
- Kevin Arthur Stroud – For service to the community of Caloundra.
- Jill Mary Stuart – For service to community health in the Hunter Valley.
- Walter Albin Suber – For service to the Slovenian community, and to the steel manufacturing industry.
- Steven John Sullivan – For service to the community through emergency response organisations.
- Michelle Sustersic – For service to the Slovenian community of Sydney.
- The late Walter William Sutcliffe – For service to music as a choral conductor and organist.
- Paul Geoffrey Sweeney – For service to the arts, and to the Indigenous community of the Northern Territory.
- Kayla Szumer – For service to the community through social welfare organisations.
- Dr Judy Tang – For service to mental health, to cultural diversity, to equality, and to ageing.
- Dr John Geoffrey Taylor – For service to conservation and the environment.
- The Reverend John Waldron Taylor – For service to the community through a range of organisations.
- Margaret Taylor – For service to community music.
- Nigel Kent Taylor, ESM – For service to lifesaving in Victoria.
- Ross Gregory Taylor – For service to surf lifesaving, and to the community of the Illawarra.
- William Geoffrey Taylor – For service to the community through a range of roles.
- Daniel John Tellam – For service to veterans.
- Leo John Tellefson – For service to the community of the Buloke Shire.
- Palanichamy Ochathevar Thevar – For service to the Tamil and Indian communities of Queensland.
- Raymond George Thomas – For service to veterans and their families.
- Geoffrey Noble Thompson – For service to the communities of Shepparton and Tallygaroopna.
- Donald Thompson Akemarr – For service to the Indigenous community of the Northern Territory.
- Helen Laurie Tickle – For service to local government, and to the community of Tamworth.
- Ferruccio Tonini – For service to nursing.
- Bruce Vincent Townsend – For service to the community of Raymond Terrace.
- Gerlinde Trappe – For service to the community of the Barossa, and to the arts.
- Richard John Trigg – For service to youth, and to the community.
- Alan Justin Trueman – For service to music through brass bands.
- Graeme Sidney Turner – For service to the community of the Gippsland region.
- Susan Margaret Turner – For service to sustainable housing.
- Adrian Leigh Tyler – For service to the communities of the Rupanyup and the Yarriambiack Shire.
- Jennifer Reay Tyrrell – For service to the community through a range of roles.
- Rodney Douglas Walker – For service to the arts as an entertainer.
- Russell Henry Walkington – For service to broadcast media.
- Peter Charles Wallace – For service to community health.
- Ronald Craig Warman – For service to Australian rules football, and to the community.
- Douglas Ralph Warmington – For service to the church, and to the community.
- Kenneth Bruce Warnes – For service to conservation, and to the district and community of Owen.
- Dr Mark Francis Waters – For service to medical administration.
- Kevin Claude Watkins – For service to the community of Launceston.
- John Bennett Watson – For service to veterans.
- Dr Paul Andrew Watters – For service to tertiary education.
- Lee-Anne Watts – For service to local government, and to the community of Scone.
- John William Weeks – For service to secondary education.
- Christine Sarah Welsh – For service to the community through emergency response organisations.
- Captain Milton Gregory West, RFD, ED – For service to veterans.
- The late Edward Bethlehem Whitham – For service to the multicultural community of Tamworth.
- Shane Andrew Wicks – For service to the community through emergency response organisations.
- Christine Shirley Williams – For service to Australian rules football.
- Richard Noel Wills – For service to veterans and their families.
- Nigel Murray Wilson – For service to the community through a range of organisations.
- Paul David Woodhouse – For service to the community of north-western Queensland.
- Lorraine Merle Woodman – For service to cricket, and to the community.
- The late Archibald Julian Woods – For service to the community of the Yorke Peninsula.
- Catherine Yeomans – For service to the community through a range of organisations.
- Reginald Alan Young – For service to the electrical trade industry.
- Anthony Zuiderwyk – For service to youth, and to the community.

Honorary – General

- Beverley Anne Edwards – For service to the community of the Cardinia region.
- John Lewis Forrest, RFD – For service to cricket.
- George McDonald – For service to badminton.
- Marie Elin McPadden – For service to the community through a range of roles.
- The late Cornelis Sliedrecht – For service to the visual arts.

==== Military Division ====
Navy

- Warrant Officer Cheryl Anne Collins, CSM – For meritorious performance of duty as Command Warrant Officer Training Force, Command Warrant Officer Navy People, and Warrant Officer Joint Operations Command.
- Commander Nicholas Patrick Doyle, RAN – For meritorious performance of duty in the delivery and management of Navy Collective Training.
- Commander Wesley Karl North, RAN – For meritorious service in submarine engineering and technical submariner workforce development.
- Petty Officer Kerryn Sue Seaborn – For meritorious service to the Royal Australian Navy as a Physical Training Instructor.
- Chief Petty Officer Erol Jade Williams – For meritorious service in the field of Indigenous engagement and cultural advancement.

Army

- Warrant Officer Class Two K – For meritorious performance of duty in Training Development and Employment Category Management roles within Special Operations Command.
- Warrant Officer Class One Kimberly Yvonne Kiely – For meritorious service as the Regimental Sergeant Major of the 2nd Health Brigade, Sydney University Regiment, and 3rd Combat Service Support Battalion.
- Warrant Officer Class One Michael Patrick Killalea – For meritorious performance of duty advancing and fostering the Distribution Specialisation trade.
- Warrant Officer Class One Anthony James Luchterhand – For meritorious service over successive Regimental Sergeant Major appointments as a senior enlisted advisor, master trainer and mentor.

Air Force

- Flight Lieutenant Christopher Leigh Rhone – For meritorious performance of duty in F-35A Lightning II aircraft maintenance for the Royal Australian Air Force.
- Wing Commander Estevan Samaens – For meritorious service in sustainment, maintenance and upgrade operations in support of the F/A-18F Super Hornet for the Royal Australian Air Force.
- Air Commodore Brett Robert Williams, CSM – For meritorious performance of duty to the Australian Defence Force as Director of Strategic Design – Air Force and Officer Commanding Air Academy.

== Meritorious Service ==
=== Public Service Medal (PSM) ===
Public Service Medal ribbon

Federal

- Peter Milton Cottrell – For outstanding public service to Australia's critical IT infrastructure.
- Sarah Elizabeth Godden – For outstanding public service in the development and implementation of regulatory reforms.
- Sobet Haddad – For outstanding public service in leadership and legal contributions for Commonwealth merits review tribunals and migration law.
- Julie Elizabeth Inman Grant – For outstanding public service to the improvement of online safety for Australians.
- Maureen Veronica McCarty – For outstanding public service in critical health workforce data and planning across Australian governments.
- Gareth William Meyer – For outstanding public service in leadership and economic security to Australia and beyond.
- Mukund Narayana Murti – For outstanding public service in strengthening trade and investment relationships between Australia and Southeast Asia.
- Paul David Ryan – For outstanding public service in advancing climate-smart land management in Australia.
- Jody Salmon – For outstanding public service in the delivery of reform agendas to benefit Australians with disability.
- Katherine Leigh Van Gurp – For outstanding public service in leading key reforms across law enforcement agencies.
- Elizabeth Harcourt Ward – For outstanding public service to Australia's trade and foreign policy interests in the Indo-Pacific region.
- James White – For outstanding public service in climate change and energy policy.

New South Wales

- Margaret Anne Baker – For outstanding public service to legal services in NSW public education.
- Shirley Brown – For outstanding public service to NSW health in nursing and chronic care services.
- Marilyn Elizabeth Chilvers – For outstanding public service to NSW in data research and analysis.
- Mia Amanda Kumar – For outstanding public service to NSW public education.
- Dr Mary Elinor McCaskill – For outstanding public service to NSW Health through leadership in patient care and safety.
- Julie Ann Ravallion – For outstanding public service to environmental planning and natural resource management.
- Anne Reddie – For outstanding public service to education in NSW, particularly in child wellbeing and mental health services.
- David John Sherley – For outstanding public service to local government and the Bathurst region.
- Kathryn Elizabeth Tidd – For outstanding public service to disability advocacy in the NSW public sector.
- Joann Wilkie – For outstanding public service to fiscal management in NSW particularly during the COVID-19 pandemic.

Victoria

- Anne Lorraine Congleton – For outstanding public service in policy and service design, corporate resources management and operational service delivery.
- Andrea Lee Davidson – For outstanding public service to youth justice in Victoria.
- Kate Leslie Gavens – For outstanding public service in leadership and innovation in environmental policy and legislation.
- Jodie Geissler – For outstanding public service in the health and mental health sectors of Victoria.
- Michaela Joy Hart – For outstanding public service to archival practice and access to records.
- Anthony John Kolmus – For outstanding public service in the disability and social services sectors.
- Joan Ursula Phillips – For outstanding public service in environmental governance and stewardship.
- Elizabeth Marie Wilson – For outstanding public service and leadership in digital capability and safety in public education.

Queensland

- Dr Jason Brown – For outstanding public service to support clinical outcomes for burns patients and digital health transformation in Queensland.
- Claude Douglas Jones – For outstanding public service to educational reforms in Queensland schools.
- David Leslie Kafoa – For outstanding public service in civil, road and structures maintenance in Queensland.
- Renee Melissa Kyle – For outstanding public service to First Nations justice, policy and program reform in Queensland.
- Kenneth John Sherwood – For outstanding public service to the surveying industry in Queensland.
- Scott Michael Stewart – For outstanding public service to local government and infrastructure in Queensland.

Western Australia

- Wendy Casey – For outstanding public service in Aboriginal health policy, cultural understanding and supporting improved health outcomes for Aboriginal communities.
- Lynnette Harding – For outstanding public service to the Moora community and support to the Western Australia Police Force.
- Richard James Sellers – For outstanding public service in leading strategic reform, resource development and promoting inclusive engagement across government and industry.

South Australia

- Scott Anthony Bayliss – For outstanding public service in delivering digital transformation and reform initiatives.
- Rebecca Jane Huddy – For outstanding public service as the principal of Westport Primary School.
- Tammie Michelle Pribanic – For outstanding public service through sustained leadership and reform in the Department of Treasury and Finance.

Tasmania

- Mark Adrian Chladil – For outstanding public service in the advancement of bushfire protection and community safety.
- Catherine Anne Schofield – For outstanding public service to mental health care in Tasmania.
- Malcolm John Smith – For outstanding public service in cyber security.

Australian Capital Territory

- Clinical Associate Professor Philip John Crispin – For outstanding public service in patient blood management and transfusion medicine.
- Derek Anthony Kettle – For outstanding public service in legal leadership and constitutional advice.
- Anne-Maree Sabellico – For outstanding public service in leading reforms in child protection and youth justice.

Northern Territory

- Chris Hosking – For outstanding public service to government in the Northern Territory.
- Gemma Siobhan Lake – For outstanding public service to government in the Northern Territory.

=== Australian Police Medal (APM) ===
Australian Police Medal ribbon

Federal

- Detective Sergeant Patrick David Gordon
- Assistant Commissioner David John McLean
- Commander Caroline Ellen Taylor

New South Wales

- Chief Inspector J
- Detective Superintendent Darren William Beeche
- Detective Chief Inspector Stuart Anthony Bell
- Inspector Gregory John Donaldson
- Detective Inspector Rachel Belinda Fawcett
- Detective Chief Inspector Matthew James Kehoe
- Chief Inspector Rodney Christopher Pratt
- Chief Inspector Scott James Russell
- Superintendent Christopher Schilt

Victoria

- Inspector Susan Maree Davis (Nolan)
- Detective Sergeant Dr Jenelle Catherine Hardiman
- Inspector Kate Louise O'Neill
- Acting Sergeant Nektarios Parissis

Queensland

- Chief Superintendent David John Cuskelly
- Detective Senior Sergeant Anthony Paul Green
- Detective Chief Inspector Alisa Anne La Pila
- Assistant Commissioner Glenn David Morris
- Chief Inspector David Harold Neville
- Senior Sergeant Mark Jay Whitnall
- Roger Craig Whyte

Western Australia

- Superintendent Darryl Wayne Cox
- Senior Sergeant Gregory James Cunningham
- Superintendent Paul Michael Daly
- Detective Superintendent Simone Amelia Van Der Sluys
- Senior Constable Emma Victoria Wright

South Australia

- Senior Sergeant First Class Colleen Jane Hilditch
- Chief Superintendent Stephen Hardman Howard
- Assistant Commissioner Stuart Vaughan McLean

Tasmania

- Inspector Philippa Jane Burk
- Commander Damien Leslie George

Northern Territory

- Senior Constable Josef Keith Hart
- Detective Superintendent Lee Jay Morgan

=== Australian Fire Service Medal (AFSM) ===
Australian Fire Service Medal ribbon

New South Wales

- Trent Anthony Brown
- Denise Lynne Butcher
- Mardi Louise Cook
- Gregory Frullani
- Max Roger Hedges
- Gary Robert Laker
- Liam Angus Macwilliam
- Graeme O'Brien
- David Murray Philp
- Frederick Keith Teudt
- David John Welch

Victoria

- Kelvin Jeffrey Bateman
- Brendan Francis Blake
- Emma Louise Conway
- Andrew Garth Johnson
- Graham Kirk
- Gavin Charles Parker

Queensland

- Quinn Danielle Cramer
- Robert Douglas Frey
- Christopher Thomas Gilchrist
- Garry William Hoonhout

Western Australia

- Daryl Gilbert Clohessy
- John Harry Jonker
- Andrew James Lane

South Australia

- Martin Osmund Carney
- Stuart James Helmore
- Simon Russell Kirkmoe
- John William Probert

Tasmania

- Paul Andrew Baker
- Kim Frances Brundle-Lawrence
- Stuart Brian Males

Australian Capital Territory

- Paul Robert Owens

Northern Territory

- Beverley Anne Shuker

=== Ambulance Service Medal (ASM) ===
Ambulance Service Medal ribbon

New South Wales

- Bernard John Coren
- Kirsty England
- Martin Jonathan Pearce
- Terence John Savage

Victoria

- Jessica Joy Drummond
- Danny Elbaum
- Steven John Grove
- Heather Mary Hodgkin
- Rebecca Lee Veitch

Queensland

- Stephen John Johns
- Susan Rebecca Neale
- Dahleen Joyce Nugent

Western Australia

- Lauren Marie D'Arcy
- David Alexander Emerson

South Australia

- Sandra Joy Gutsche
- Kieran Dominic Johnson

Northern Territory

- Aaron Shaun Brooks

=== Emergency Services Medal (ESM) ===
Emergency Services Medal ribbon

New South Wales

- Commissioner Brenton James Charlton
- Juliana Katharine Garancsi
- Tracey Sabrina Hare-Boyd
- Jamie Stoddart
- Michael David Ward
- Joel Brendon Wiseman

Victoria

- Dianne Maree Dale
- George Haitidis
- Tony Marchesani
- Kane Kevin Treloar

Queensland

- Dannielle Leigh Bull
- Jennifer Ann Crump
- Amanda Lee Johnson
- Nicole Catherine Lockie

Western Australia

- Gregory Maurice Cook
- Mark Daniel Geary
- Andrew Matraszek
- Donald Brett O'Leary
- David John Thomson

South Australia

- Kerry John Marshall
- David William Potter

Tasmania

- Susan Jane Kelder

Northern Territory

- Mark Bryan Cunnington

=== Australian Corrections Medal (ACM) ===
Australian Corrections Medal ribbon

New South Wales

- Samara Jaye Abbott
- James Martin Adair
- Guy Daryl Blinman
- Minh Ba Tran
- Mitchell Von Borstel

Victoria

- Serena Francke
- Julie Theresa Marchant
- Victoria Ryan

Queensland

- Lyle Stanislaus Baker
- Louise Jane Kneeshaw
- Dee-Anne Kuilboer
- Nadia Ann Nearhos (Tschirpig)
- Jennifer Susan Runge
- Assistant Commissioner Joel Brady Smith

Western Australia

- Dean Anthony English
- Wayne Lionel Marlow

South Australia

- Julie Margot Telfer

Tasmania

- Rachael Anne Parker

=== Australian Intelligence Medal (AIM) ===
Australian Intelligence Medal ribbon

- Malak A
- Carl Chang
- Felicity Galvin
- Angela Hardwick
- Peita Loughhead
- David M
- Jeff P
- Mark P
- Christopher Yee

== Distinguished and Conspicuous Service ==
=== Commendation for Distinguished Service ===
Commendation for Distinguished Service ribbon

Army

- Sergeant Ashlee Louise Liversedge – For distinguished performance of duties in warlike operations as a Medic with Task Group Taji, whilst deployed in Iraq on Operation OKRA on 11 March 2020.
- Ms (then Corporal) Sarah Jane Nixon – For distinguished performance of duties in warlike operations as a Medic with Task Group Taji whilst deployed in Iraq on Operation OKRA on 11 March 2020.

=== Bar to the Conspicuous Service Cross (CSC and Bar) ===
Conspicuous Service Cross and Bar ribbon

Army

- Colonel Gerard Ryan Kearns, CSC – For outstanding achievement as the Commander Australian Contingent on Operation PALADIN during the period September 2023 to October 2024.

Air Force

- Group Captain Anthony Kay, CSC – For outstanding achievement in the application of extraordinary skills and judgement in the development and control of Air Mobility capability for the Australian Defence Force.
- Air Commodore Kaarin Nina Kooij, CSC – For outstanding devotion to duty as Director General Joint Transition Authority delivering continuous improvement and operationalisation of the transition operating model that supports Australian Defence Force personnel and their families.

=== Conspicuous Service Cross (CSC) ===
Conspicuous Service Cross ribbon

Navy

- Lieutenant Commander Malcolm Terence Bonehill, RAN – For outstanding devotion to duty in the field of Navy personnel welfare and support.
- Captain Aaron Leon Cox, RAN – For outstanding devotion to duty in the field of capability management of the Hobart Class Destroyer.
- Commander Stefanie Maree Curic, RAN – For outstanding devotion to duty in the management of Navy Engineering training.
- Lieutenant Commander Caitlin Melanie Fuller, RAN – For outstanding achievement in intelligence training, governance, and capability development for the Royal Australian Navy and the Australian Defence Force.
- Lieutenant Commander Jay Pettifer, CSM, RAN – For outstanding achievement in the development of the Naval Force Protection Bureau.
- Chief Petty Officer Bradley Scott Smith – For outstanding devotion to duty as a Senior Enlisted Sailor in Navy's Submarine Force.

Army

- Sergeant Kirsti Anne Claymore – For outstanding devotion to duty in the application of Defence Values and superior judgement to support service personnel and their families in adversity.
- Lieutenant Colonel Sven Harris – For outstanding achievement and the application of skills as Operations Officer, Headquarters 1st (Australian) Division.
- Corporal Geoffrey Michael Izod – For outstanding devotion to duty as the rescue crewman on an MRH90 helicopter during Operation FLOOD ASSIST 22–1, on 1 March 2022.
- Brigadier Caitlin Emma Langford – For outstanding achievement in the development of preventative measures that strengthen the mental health and wellbeing of the Australian Defence Force.
- Colonel Scottie James Morris – For outstanding achievement as the Commander of Headquarters Middle East on Operation ACCORDION from March 2024 to December 2024.
- Lieutenant Colonel Tegan Irene Musumeci – For outstanding achievement in the delivery of theatre logistics to the integrated force and our allies and partners as Commanding Officer of Joint Logistics Unit – North.
- Sergeant Rick Leslie Scott – For outstanding devotion to duty as the rescue crewman on Trooper 70 during Operation FLOOD ASSIST 22–1 on 25 February 2022.
- Colonel Lauren Elizabeth Wright – For outstanding devotion to duty as the Project Director for LAND 1508 Greyfin Program and across the Land Systems Division.

Air Force

- Group Captain Phillip Bryan Godfrey – For outstanding achievement in career management of senior Royal Australian Air Force personnel as Director Senior Officer Management – Air Force.
- Wing Commander Shannon James McGuckin – For outstanding achievement in Air Domain Research, Analysis and Development.
- Flight Sergeant Gary Andrew Neidert – For outstanding achievement in advancing targeting capabilities within the Australian Defence Force, enhancing interoperability and fostering Coalition cooperation.
- Group Captain Lucas Ricciardi – For outstanding achievement as Commanding Officer of Air Warfare Engineering Squadron, Air Warfare Centre.

=== Bar to the Conspicuous Service Medal (CSM and Bar) ===
Conspicuous Service Medal and Bar ribbon

Navy

- Lieutenant Commander Justin Magnus Downey-Price, CSM, RAN – For meritorious achievement as the Command Warrant Officer – Fleet Information Warfare Force.
- Warrant Officer Lyndon Montgomery Quirke, CSM – For meritorious devotion to duty as the Technical Adviser to the Kiribati Police Service Maritime Unit.

Army

- Major Justin Thomas Cross, CSM – For meritorious achievement in delivery of engineering and project management support on Operation ACCORDION from July 2024 to February 2025.

=== Conspicuous Service Medal (CSM) ===
Conspicuous Service Medal ribbon

Navy

- Petty Officer Jack Drew Bellingham – For meritorious devotion to duty as the Leading Seaman Boatswains Mate in Australian Defence Vessel Reliant.
- Lieutenant Commander Gemma Kim Casserly, RAN – For meritorious devotion to duty as Indo-Pacific and Major Fleet Unit planner at Headquarters Joint Operations Command for all Australian Defence Force Regional Presence Deployments 2022 to 2023.
- Commander Joshua Wesley Clifford, RAN – For meritorious devotion to duty in the delivery of operational intelligence as the Director of Maritime Intelligence.
- Lieutenant Commander Daniel Scott Dowell, RAN – For meritorious achievement as Officer in Charge Royal Australian Navy Tactical Data Links.
- Chief Petty Officer Gavin Lee Dowens – For meritorious devotion to duty in the field of combat system materiel seaworthiness and tactical development for the Hobart Class destroyers.
- Captain Benjamin John Hurst, RAN – For meritorious achievement in the field of Navy Engineering.
- Chief Petty Officer Adam Clements Moxham – For meritorious devotion to duty as the Warfare 1, Warfare 2 and Hydrographic Strategic Career Manager in the Royal Australian Navy.
- Leading Seaman Jack Murray Schulz – For meritorious devotion to duty in the field of Navy technical training.
- Lieutenant Commander Scott James Shipton, OAM, RAN – For meritorious devotion to duty as the Command Warrant Officer of the Royal Australian Navy Recruit School and HMAS Cerberus.
- Lieutenant Perri Anne Trew, RAN – For meritorious devotion to duty as the Maritime Human Resources Officer HMAS Cerberus.
- Chief Petty Officer Tara-Ann Wilson – For meritorious devotion to duty as the Senior Technical Officer in HMAS Albany.

Army

- Major P – For meritorious devotion to duty as the Administration and Welfare Officer within the Special Air Service Regiment from 2023 to 2024.
- Signaller Bailey Aaron Campbell – For meritorious devotion to duty and dedication as an Information Systems Technician during the conduct of Operation BEECH during the period August to November 2024.
- Lieutenant Colonel Christopher Paul Dent – For meritorious achievement in support of the Australian Army's international engagement with Japan, as Australian Army Liaison Officer to the Japan Ground Self-Defense Force.
- Lieutenant Colonel Julian David Fleming – For meritorious devotion to duty as the Commanding Officer of the 9th Force Support Battalion.
- Lieutenant Colonel Christopher Anthony Kukas – For meritorious achievement as Staff Officer Personnel Plans, within Headquarters Joint Operations Command.
- Colonel Andrew Stephen Moss – For meritorious devotion to duty as a lead Policy Officer in Joint Health Command and the Mental Health and Wellbeing Branch.
- Warrant Officer Class One William Renwick – For meritorious achievement in supply chain management during the withdrawal from service of the M1A1 Main Battle Tank and introduction into service of the Boxer Combat Reconnaissance Vehicle in 2nd/14th Light Horse Regiment (Queensland Mounted Infantry).
- Colonel Scott Christian Revell – For meritorious achievement as Commanding Officer and Chief Instructor of the Queensland University Regiment.
- Warrant Officer Class Two Corey James Rocca – For meritorious achievement in developing equipment viability and maintenance processes within the International Donation Coordination Centre, in support of Ukrainian Armed Forces on SECURITY RESPONSE TEAM–EUROPE from December 2023 to July 2024.
- Lieutenant Colonel Michael Charles Squire – For meritorious achievement in non-warlike operations as the Deputy Strategy, Plans and Assessments on Operation OKRA from May 2024 to December 2024.
- Major Joshua Arnold Vogel – For meritorious achievement as an Explosive Ordnance Disposal Officer on Operation LILIA from November to December 2023 and Operation RENDER SAFE from July to August 2023 and August to September 2024.
- Warrant Officer Class One Nigel Turner Ward – For meritorious devotion to duty in providing support to Army's people, units, formations and commands as the Pay and Administration Centre New South Wales Army Liaison Officer.
- Lieutenant Colonel Shandelle Nicole Welbourne – For meritorious achievement in the realisation of rapid capability development through the Army Minors Program for the Australian Army.

Air Force

- Flight Lieutenant I – For meritorious achievement whilst assigned to the offensive cyber mission within the Australian Signals Directorate.
- Flight Sergeant Anthony John Ahchow – For meritorious achievement in aviation fuels management and mental health coaching.
- Warrant Officer Geoffrey William Bird – For meritorious achievement in the delivery of Dangerous Goods Training in the Australian Defence Force.
- Flying Officer Chad Kelvin Bowes – For meritorious achievement in rapid capability development and security transformation on the P-8A Poseidon aircraft.
- Warrant Officer Kerrie-Anne Megan Hammond – For meritorious devotion to duty as the Squadron Warrant Officer at Number 382 Squadron.
- Sergeant Gavin Jefferies – For meritorious achievement in maintenance co-ordination for the Royal Australian Air Force.
- Wing Commander Grant Guy Leader – For meritorious achievement as the Liaison Officer within the United States Air Warfare Centre.
- Flight Lieutenant Scott Andrew McNichol – For meritorious achievement as the Commander of the Air Task Unit for Operation BEECH from August 2024 to November 2024.
- Warrant Officer Ivan Petrovic – For meritorious achievement as Warrant Officer Ceremonial for the Australian Defence Force.
- Flight Lieutenant Thomas James Rogers – For meritorious achievement in the development and conduct of the Royal Australian Air Force Evacuation Handling Centre capability on Operation BEECH from October to December 2023 and August to September 2024, and New Caledonia Military Assisted Departure in May 2024.
