= Anne Kelso =

Australian biomedical researcher (born 1954)

Professor Anne Kelso AC FAA FAHMS
- Born: 1954 (age 71–72)
- Education: University of Melbourne
- Scientific career
- Workplaces: National Health and Medical Research Council

Anne Kelso (born 1954) is an Australian biomedical researcher specialising in immunology and influenza. She was the chief executive officer of the Australian Government's National Health and Medical Research Council (NHMRC) from 2016 to 2023.

== Education and career ==
Kelso obtained her Bachelor of Science (Honours) in 1975 and PhD in immunology in 1980 at the University of Melbourne.

Following postdoctoral research at the Swiss Institute for Experimental Cancer Research, Kelso undertook research in the laboratories of Donald Metcalf and Gustav Nossal at the Walter and Eliza Hall Institute of Medical Research (1982–1992) and then the Queensland Institute of Medical Research (now QIMR Berghofer Medical Research Institute) (1992–2007). Kelso was also Director/CEO of the Cooperative Research Centre for Vaccine Technology from 2000 until 2006. In 2007, she returned to Melbourne as Director of the WHO Collaborating Centre for Reference and Research on Influenza until 2015 when she took up the role of CEO of the National Health and Medical Research Council. Her appointment was renewed for a further five years in 2018.

Kelso has previously served as president of the Australasian Society for Immunology, as Secretary-General of the International Union of Immunological Societies, and as a member of several governing boards and advisory groups, including the Council of QUT and the boards of the Telethon Kids Institute and the Florey Institute of Neuroscience and Mental Health. She has also served on committees advising the World Health Organization and the Australian Government on influenza.

As CEO of NHMRC, Kelso oversees the agency's activities to improve the health of the Australian community through: investment in health and medical research in Australian universities, medical research institutes and hospitals; translation of research into policy and practice through clinical, public health and environmental health guidelines; development of guidelines on ethical practice in health care and the conduct of health and medical research; and administration of legislation regulating research using human embryos. She also represents NHMRC on the Board of Trustees of the Human Frontier Science Programme Organization and the Strategy Board of the Global Alliance for Chronic Diseases.

Kelso's key focus areas have been the restructure of NHMRC's grant program, developments in NHMRC's peer review processes, and initiatives to improve gender equality in health and medical research.

== Biomedical research ==
Kelso undertook research on the regulation of T lymphocyte effector function, particularly the cellular and molecular control of cytokine synthesis and cytolytic activity. As Director of the WHO Collaborating Centre for Reference and Research on Influenza, she was also part of a collaborative research team working on T cell immunity to influenza viruses. The Australian Academy of Science recognises her research contributions to Australian science as "wide-ranging and significant".

Kelso holds an honorary professorial appointment in the Department of Microbiology and immunology at the University of Melbourne.

== Awards and recognition ==
Kelso was appointed Officer an Officer of the Order of Australia in the 2007 Queen's Birthday Honours for "service to science, particularly in the field of immunology and vaccine research through contributions to a range of scientific organisations, and as an academic and mentor". She was promoted to Companion of the Order of Australia in the 2026 Australia Day Honours for "eminent service to health and medical research sciences and administration, to Australian influenza preparedness, and to gender equity".

In 2018, Kelso was elected Fellow of the Australian Academy of Science and Fellow of the Australian Academy of Health and Medical Sciences.

== Works ==
- Kelso, Anne; Clouston, Andrew (1996), Cytokines in transplantation, R.G. Landes; New York : Chapman & Hall, ISBN 978-3-540-60731-1
