= Jeff Borland =

Australian economist

Jeff Borland AO is an Australian academic and labour economist. He is currently the Truby Williams Professor of Economics at the University of Melbourne. He received the 2020 Distinguished Fellow Award from the Economic Society of Australia.

He regularly appears in the Australian media on the topic of economics and public policy, and has published research papers on the Australian labour market, among others.

Borland was appointed as an Officer of the Order of Australia (AO) in the 2026 Australia Day Honours for "distinguished service to business as a labour market economist, to tertiary education, to microeconomic research, and to public policy development".

== Education ==
Borland completed a Bachelor of Arts and Master of Arts at the University of Melbourne, and a PhD in economics from Yale University.

He was previously a visiting professor at Harvard University as well as Head of the Department of Economics and Deputy Dean of the business faculty at University of Melbourne.

== Publications ==
- Borland, J. (2022). Technically unemployment now begins with a '3'. How to keep it there?
- Alexander, O., Borland, J., Charlton, A. & Singh, A. (2022). The Labour Market for Uber Drivers in Australia. AUSTRALIAN ECONOMIC REVIEW, pp. 18-, 10.1111/1467-8462.12454
- Borland, J. (2021). Labor in the Age of Finance: Pensions, Politics, and Corporations from Deindustrialization to Dodd-Frank. ECONOMIC RECORD, 97(319), pp. 565–567, 10.1111/1475-4932.12645
