= Peter Cook (Australian footballer) =

Australian rules footballer (1932–2025)

Personal information
- Full name: David Athol Cook
- Born: 1 November 1932
- Died: 17 September 2025 (aged 92); Warrnambool, Australia
- Original team: Yallourn
- Height: 185 cm (6 ft 1 in)
- Weight: 81.5 kg (180 lb)

Playing career^{1}
Years	Club	Games (Goals)
1956–58	Melbourne	14 (6)
- ^{1} Playing statistics correct to the end of 1958.

David Athol "Peter" Cook (1 November 1932 – 17 September 2025) was an Australian rules footballer who played with Melbourne in the Victorian Football League (VFL). Known by the name Peter, his real first name was David. Cook died at his home in Warrnambool, on 17 September 2025, at the age of 92.
