= Ian Constable =

Australian ophthalmologist

Professor Ian Constable AO FAHMS FRSN

Foundation Lions Professor of Ophthalmology, University of Western Australia
- In office 1975–?

Personal details
- Born: Ian Jeffrey Constable

Ian Jeffrey Constable is an Australian ophthalmologist and the founder and director of the Lions Eye Institute in Perth, Western Australia. He was the Foundation Lions Professor of Ophthalmology at the University of Western Australia, and the Foundation Director of UWA's Centre for Ophthalmology and Visual Science. He is now Patron of the Lions Eye Institute.

Constable was also the Chairman of the West Australian State Science Council (2000 to 2006) and the Director of Ophthalmology Services for the WA Department of Health and a member of the State Health Research Advisory Council.

Constable has been a consultant ophthalmologist to six Perth hospitals, including Royal Perth Hospital and Princess Margaret Hospital for Children. His clinical sub-specialties are vitreoretinal surgery, retinal vascular disease, diabetic retinopathy and macular degeneration Constable has led research in a range of blinding eye diseases and translated the discoveries into development companies, including listings on the Australian and New York exchanges. He was a State Citizen of the year and National EY entrepreneur of the year and an AICD medal awardee for his charitable eye work. He is a member of the WA Science as well as the Lions Halls of Fame.

== Education and early career ==
After secondary education at Shore School in Sydney, Constable graduated in medicine and surgery from the university in 1965. He worked at the Royal Prince Alfred Hospital in Sydney until 1970, and then was a Retinal Research Fellow at Harvard Medical School from 1970 to 1971. He was a Clinical Retinal Fellow at the Massachusetts Eye and Ear Infirmary in Boston from 1971 to 1972 and an instructor in ophthalmology at Harvard from 1974 to 1975. In 1975 he was the Foundation Lions Professor of Ophthalmology at the University of Western Australia, and in 1983 he was the Foundation Director of the Lions Eye Institute.

== Other roles ==
Constable has been appointed to the boards of many research foundations, including the Ophthalmic Research Institute of Australia and the Karl Stein Foundation. He is still on the board of several foundations, including the Australian Foundation for the Prevention of Blindness, and is a senior advisor to the Lions Save Sight Foundation and an honorary advisor to the Retina Australia Foundation.

== Journals and authorship ==
Constable reviews for many journals and research foundations, including the National Health and Medical Research Council of Australia, the American Diabetes Research Foundation, the British Journal of Ophthalmology and the Ramaciotti Foundation. He has authored approximately 400 refereed articles in international medical and scientific journals, and written two textbooks.

== International appointments ==
His international appointments include board member of the International Advisory Council of the World Cataract Surgeons' Foundation and a board member of the International Council of Ophthalmology.

== Awards ==
Constable's awards include the ANZAC Peace Prize (awarded by the Returned and Services League in 2006), a Centenary Medal of Australia in 2000, and an Officer, Order of Australia, in 1987. In June 2008 he was awarded the inaugural Sir Charles Court Inspiring Leadership Award at the 2008 WA Citizen of the Year Foundation Day Awards. In 2020 he was elected Fellow of the Australian Academy of Health and Medical Sciences and Fellow of the Royal Society of New South Wales.

He has given many named lectures during his career, and since 2000 the annual Ian Constable Lecture has been presented in Perth. Speakers at the Lecture have included Julian D. Gale and Bob Williamson. The 2006 speaker was Barry Marshall, Nobel Prize winner (2005, Physiology or Medicine). The 2007 Lecture was delivered on Monday 10 September 2007 by Professor Peter Quinn, Professor of Astronomy at the University of Western Australia's School of Physics and Premier's Fellow. Professor Quinn will present an overview of modern astronomy and mankind's quest to find the dawn of creation.

== Professional membership ==
Constable is a member of many professional organisations, including the American Academy of Ophthalmology and the Australian Society for Medical Research.

== Research grants ==
He has held many competitive National Health and Medical Research Council grants since 1976, and is co-principal investigator to two Centre grants: 'Development of new treatments for retinal diseases and glaucoma' ($5.7 million) and 'Gene-based strategies for diabetic retinopathy' ($2.6 million).

== Personal interests ==
Constable's personal interests include art collecting (he is a former board member of the Art Gallery of Western Australia), antique cars, music and opera, and sailing.

He is married to Liz Constable, a former member of parliament for the WA electoral district of Churchlands.
