= Lions Eye Institute =

Australian medical research institute

Lions Eye Institute (Australia)
- Motto: Better vision for all
- Founder: Professor Ian Constable AO
- Established: 1983; 43 years ago
- Mission: Medical research
- Focus: Eye disease
- Chair: Tony Joyner
- Chief Executive Officer: Dr Glen Power
- Faculty: University of Western Australia
- Key people: Tony Joyner (Chairman); Glen Power (Chief Executive Officer); Professor Chandra Balaratnasingam (Medical Director); Associate Professor Fred Chen (Director of Research); JoAnne Forrest (Director Clinical Research); Angus Turner (McCusker Director Lions Outback Vision)
- Location: Nedlands, Perth, Western Australia, Australia
- Website: www.lei.org.au

The Lions Eye Institute (LEI) is an Australian medical research institute affiliated with the University of Western Australia. It was established in 1983 with support of the Lions Clubs of Western Australia and headquartered in the Perth suburb of Nedlands, Western Australia. The LEI is a not-for-profit centre of excellence that combines an ophthalmic clinic with scientific discovery developing techniques for the prevention of blindness and the reduction of pain from blinding eye conditions.

== History ==
At a 1970 convention in Albany, Western Australia, the Western Australian Lions Clubs created the Lions Save Sight Foundation (WA) Inc. with the aim of leading the development of ophthalmic care. In 1975 the Lions Save-Sight Foundation (LSSF) established the Lions Chair in Ophthalmology at the University of Western Australia. Since its establishment, clinical facilities, new equipment, and research laboratories have been strategically commissioned to support the LEI's core activities. In 1983, under Professor Ian Constable's guidance, the LEI, a not-for-profit organisation was established. With Constable, the LEI became an international centre for scientific research into blindness. Following its development, it relocated to the grounds of Sir Charles Gairdner Hospital. Its current Managing Director Bill Morgan leads a team of clinicians, medical professionals, researchers and support staff. In 1994, the Institute created in partnership with the University of Western Australia, the Centre for Ophthalmology and Visual Science (COVS). This centre has an independent University status within the Faculty of Medicine and Dentistry. In 2003, the LEI revised its basis of incorporation from a public benevolent charitable institution to a not-for profit limited liability company.

== Overview ==
The LEI employs scientists, clinicians, and support staff to conduct scientific research into blindness with known ophthalmic practices in Australia. The Institute also includes a Laser Vision Centre, Western Australia's refractive surgery centre; the Lions Eye Bank, Lions Outback Vision, Lions Optics and the LSSF. The LEI actively participates in numerous clinical trials for the development of new treatments for eye diseases, in collaboration with scientists, ophthalmologists, and pharmaceutical companies. The Institute receives funds from clinic operations and its grants from organisations such as the National Health and Medical Research Council, individual benefactors and the LSSF.

== Services ==
The LEI provides a range of services including standard clinical services, LASIK surgery at the Lions Laser Vision Center, cataract micro-surgery and lens implantation, plastic surgery of the eyelids and full optometric service at Lions Optics. The Lions Eye Bank collects and distributes corneal tissue, scleral tissue and supplies thousands of corneal transplants throughout Western Australia. The Institute initiated the Pilbara Aboriginal Eye Health Program, a strategy targeting indigenous people who suffer from diabetes and associated blinding eye diseases prevalent within the Aboriginal population. As part of the Australian Government aid to the Indonesian Government, In July 2007, the LEI was instrumental in setting up the Bali Mandara Eye Hospital which was handed over to the Indonesian Government on 13 October 2015. The LEI provides open consultations and health education seminars in cooperation with several organisations including Glaucoma Australia, Retinitis Pigmentosa Society of Western Australia, Macular Degeneration Foundation and the Australian Foundation for the Prevention of Blindness. Its ophthalmologists also consult at Perth's main teaching public hospitals including Sir Charles Gairdner Hospital, Royal Perth Hospital and Fremantle Hospital.

== Research Activities ==
The LEI teams investigate all major causes of blindness including cataracts, diabetes related eye disease, glaucoma, retinal degenerations, corneal, and immune-based diseases. More than 70 scientists at the LEI use a range of technologies to develop treatments for blinding diseases, including gene therapy and telemedicine. The LEI has national and international institutional partnerships including American Juvenile Diabetes Foundation, Shanghai University, Swedish University of Agricultural Science, University of Missouri and the National Eye Institute (USA). For example, the LEI participates in joint research and development projects with the American Juvenile Diabetes Foundation, Swedish University of Agricultural Sciences, University of Missouri and the National Eye Institute (USA). Research carried out by the Institute teams led to the first retinal vein bypass treatment of blockages, and the development of the first transgenic mouse model for Age-Related Macular Degeneration, the leading cause of blindness for people over 55. This model is expected to accelerate the development of ARMD leading to an effective treatment. At the LEI, the first artificial cornea, the AlphaCor was developed and implanted into a human eye. The LEI is acknowledged as a core academic centre involved in clinical trials of new pharmaceutical therapies and surgical procedures before government approval. For example, the Xen Gel Stent, an implantable transcleral microsurgical device developed at the LEI, was approved for use in the US by the FDA in 2016.

== See also ==
- Health in Australia
- Corneal dystrophies in human
- List of eye surgeries
- List of systemic diseases with ocular manifestations
- Gene therapy of the human retina
- Lions Club International
