= Peter Cook (geologist) =

Australian geologist

Peter John Cook AC CBE
- Born: 15 October 1938 (age 87)
- Education: Durham University, Australian National University, Colorado University
- Occupations: Geologist and academic
- Known for: carbon capture and storage

Professor Peter John Cook AC CBE (born 15 October 1938) is an Australian geologist who specialises in carbon capture and storage and climate change mitigation.

Cook was a founding director and chief executive of the Carbon dioxide CRC (CO2CRC) from 2003 to 2011. He had earlier been executive director of the British Geological Survey.

== Career ==
Cook was born on 15 October 1938. He earned a BSc at Durham University then an MSc at Australian National University. He earned his PhD at University of Colorado.

He worked at the Australian Bureau of Mineral Resources from 1961 until 1976. He then took a role as senior research fellow in the School of Earth Sciences at Australian National University. He returned to the Bureau of Mineral Resources as chief of division and Chief Research Scientist.

In 1990 he became director of the British Geological Survey. He remained in that role until 1998.

Cook was a founder of the Cooperative Research Centre for Greenhouse Gas Technologies (CO2CRC) in 2003 and served as its chief executive until 2011. In this role, he established the CO2CRC Otway Project.

== Awards and honours ==
Cook was created a Companion of the Order of Australia in the 2026 Australia Day Honours for eminent service to science as an innovator, pioneer and international expert in the development of carbon capture and storage, to policy development, and to climate change mitigation. He is regarded as a pioneer in this industry in Australia.

In 2004, he was awarded the Leopold von Buch Medal by the German Geological Society (DGGV) for outstanding overall achievements in the geosciences.

He was awarded a Centenary Medal on 1 January 2001 for service to Australian society in mineral resources.

He was made a Commander of the Order of the British Empire in the United Kingdom's 1996 Birthday Honours for scientific services to industry when he was serving as director, British Geological Survey.
