= Walter Boas Medal =

The Walter Boas Medal is awarded by the Australian Institute of Physics for research in Physics in Australia. It is named in memory of is named in memory of Walter Boas (1904-1982) — an eminent scientist and metallurgist who worked on the physics of metals.

== Recipients ==
- 1984 James A. Piper, Macquarie University (inaugural winner)
- 1985 Peter Hannaford, CSIRO Division of Materials Technology
- 1986 Donald Melrose, Sydney University
- 1987 Anthony William Thomas, University of Adelaide
- 1988 Robert Delbourgo, University of Tasmania
- 1989 Jim Williams, University of Western Australia
- 1990 Geoff Opat, University of Melbourne
- 1990 Tony Klein, University of Melbourne
- 1991 Parameswaran Hariharan, CSIRO Division of Applied Physics
- 1992 Bruce Harold John McKellar, University of Melbourne
- 1993 Jim Williams, Australian National University
- 1994 No medal awarded
- 1995 David Blair, University of Western Australia
- 1996 Andris Stelbovics, Murdoch University
- 1996 Igor Bray, Flinders University
- 1997 Keith Nugent, University of Melbourne
- 1997 Stephen W. Wilkins, CSIRO
- 1998 Robert Clark, University of NSW
- 1999 No medal awarded
- 2000 Hans A. Bachor, Australian National University
- 2001 Anthony G. Williams, University of Adelaide
- 2002 Peter Robinson, University of Sydney
- 2003 Gerard J. Milburn, University of Queensland
- 2004 George Dracoulis, Australian National University
- 2005 Yuri Kivshar, Australian National University
- 2006 Michael Edmund Tobar, The University of Western Australia
- 2007 Derek Leinweber, University of Adelaide
- 2008 Peter Drummond, Swinburne University of Technology
- 2009 Victor Flambaum, University of New South Wales
- 2010 Kostya Ostrikov, CSIRO
- 2011 Ben Eggleton, University of Sydney
- 2012 Lloyd Hollenberg, University of Melbourne
- 2013 Chennupati Jagadish, Australian National University
- 2014 Stuart Wyithe, University of Melbourne
- 2015 Min Gu, Swinburne University of Technology
- 2016 Geraint F. Lewis, University of Sydney
- 2017 David McClelland, Australian National University
- 2018 Elisabetta Barberio, University of Melbourne
- 2019 Andrea Morello, University of NSW
- 2020 Joss Bland-Hawthorn, University of Sydney
- 2021 Howard Wiseman, Griffith University
- 2022 Susan M. Scott, Australian National University
- 2023 Mahananda Dasgupta and David John Hinde, Australian National University
- 2024 Joanne Etheridge, Monash University
- 2025 Yuerui Lu, Australian National University

== See also ==
- List of physics awards
- List of prizes named after people
