= Mahananda Dasgupta =

Australian physicist

Mahananda Dasgupta FAIP FAA FAPS FTSE
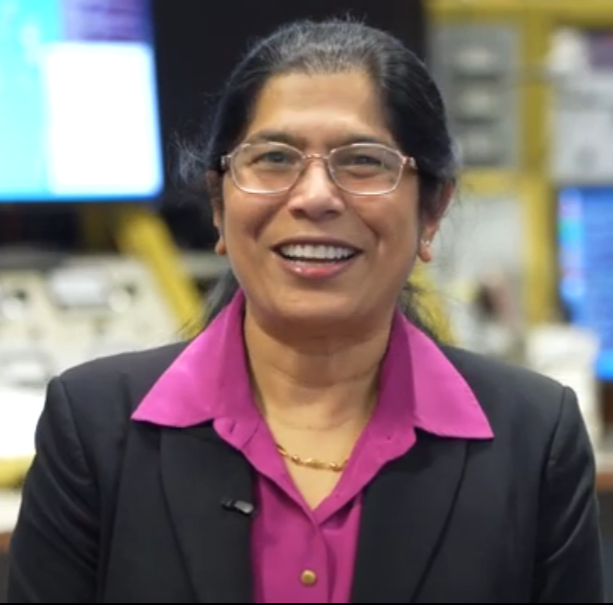
- In an ANU video in 2022
- Education: Tata Institute of Fundamental Research (Ph.D.)
- Scientific career
- Fields: Physics
- Workplaces: Australian National University

Mahananda "Nanda" Dasgupta FAIP FAA FAPS FTSE is an experimental physicist and director of the Heavy Ion Accelerator Facility in the Department of Nuclear Physics of the Australian National University. Her work focuses on accelerator-based nuclear fusion and fission.

Dasgupta has made key contributions in developing theoretical models to quantum tunnelling of composite objects, and has also designed efficient experimental particle detection equipment. Her current work aims to understand the quantum interactions of stable and unstable exotic nuclei, underpinning opportunities with next generation accelerators. Dasgupta's work is also advancing understanding on the transition from quantum to classical behaviour, which is important for the development of nanoscale technologies.

== Career ==
In 1992, Dasgupta completed her PhD at the Tata Institute of Fundamental Research in Mumbai, India. Shortly after, she moved to Australia, and in 1998 was awarded a Queen Elizabeth II Fellowship by the Australian Research Council.

In 2003, she became the first woman appointed to a tenured position in the Research School of Physical Sciences and Engineering at the Australian National University.

In 2011, Dasgupta was awarded the inaugural Georgina Sweet Australian Laureate Fellowship from the Australian Academy of Science. That year she also represented the Group of Eight universities at the Women in Science and Engineering summit at Parliament House.

She is currently a member of the National Science and Technology Council (2024-2027), and has previously served on the National Committee for Physics. She is the Director of the Heavy Ion Accelerator Facility at ANU.

== Research ==
Dasgupta's research centres on the topic of nuclear reaction dynamics in the deep inelastic scattering regime. Her contributions include measuring barriers to fusion, modelling nuclear potentials, fission of weakly-bound nuclei, and synthesis of super-heavy elements. She has studied collisions involving astronomically-relevant isotopes of lithium and beryllium. She has also developed novel nuclear physics instrumentation at heavy ion particle accelerators, including a beamline to simulate the effects of radiation in space on electronic equipment.

== Awards and honours ==
In 2004, Dasgupta undertook a nationwide lecture tour as the 2004 Australian Institute of Physics (AIP) "Women in Physics" lecturer. She is also an AIP Fellow.

In 2006, she was awarded the prestigious Pawsey medal from the Australian Academy of Science, which honours outstanding research in physics in Australia by a scientist under the age of 40.

Dasgupta was elected a fellow of the Australian Academy of Science in 2011 for "understanding the complex quantum interactions occurring in collisions of heavy nuclei".

In 2019, Dasgupta was elected a fellow of the American Physical Society for "advancing the understanding of nuclear fusion through precision measurements, highlighting the role of quantum superpositions and demonstrating the suppression of fusion for weakly-bound nuclei."

Additionally she was joint winner with David Hinde of the 2023 Walter Boas Medal, awarded by the Australian Institute of Physics for '"elucidating the crucial roles and mechanisms of nuclear structure in the synthesis of superheavy nuclei".

In 2026, she was elected a fellow of the Australian Academy of Technological Science and Engineering for "for pioneering contributions to nuclear reactions and advanced instrumentation".

== Publications ==
Dasgupta has published more than 80 papers in journals such as Nature, Physics Letters and Physical Review C.
