= Donald Melrose =

Australian astrophysicist

Donald Blair Melrose FAA
- Born: 13 September 1940 (age 85); Hobart, Tasmania
- Citizenship: Australia
- Education: University of Western Australia; University of Tasmania; Exeter College, Oxford (PhD)
- Awards: Chandrasekhar Prize (2016) Moyal Medal (2013); Ellery Medal (2004); Centenary Medal (2002); Professor of the University, University of Sydney (2000); Harrie Massey Medal and Prize (1998); Dozor Fellow, Ben Gurion University of the Negev (1997); Thomas Ranken Lyle Medal (1987); Walter Boas Medal (1986); Fellow, Australian Academy of Science (1986); Pawsey Medal (1974) Rhodes Scholar for Tasmania, Oxford University (1959)
- Scientific career
- Fields: Theoretical physics Astrophysics; Plasma physics
- Workplaces: University of Sussex; University of Maryland; Australian National University; University of Sydney; Yeshiva University

Donald Blair Melrose FAA (born 13 September 1940) is an Australian theoretical physicist, Rhodes Scholar and laureate of the Chandrasekhar prize in Plasma Physics.

He is professor of the university, and emeritus professor of theoretical physics at the University of Sydney, Fellow of the Australian Academy of Science, and Dozor Fellow at the Ben Gurion University of the Negev. He was the director of the Research Centre for Theoretical Astrophysics (1991-1999) and Head of the School of Physics (2001-2002) at the University of Sydney.

Melrose has made pioneering contributions in pulsar and solar astrophysics, as well as in the quantum theory of plasmas. He developed the covariant formulation of quantum plasmas, known as quantum plasmadynamics, by synthesising quantum electrodynamics with the kinetic theory of plasmas. He is widely regarded as a world leading expert on coherent emission processes in plasma astrophysics. Melrose is considered by many as one of the greatest living plasma physicists due to the breadth and depth of his work.

Melrose has received several prizes and awards including the 2016 Chandrasekhar prize "For his sustained original contributions to the theory of coherent emission processes in astrophysical and space plasmas, and for his seminal contributions to the theory of quantum plasmas", the Thomas Ranken Lyle Medal of the Australian Academy of Science, the Harrie Massey Medal and Prize jointly awarded by the Institute of Physics and the Australian Institute of Physics, and the Ellery Medal of the Astronomical Society of Australia.

== Education and career ==
Melrose was born in Hobart, Tasmania. He was educated at North Sydney Boys High School and at John Curtin High School, Fremantle. He commenced undergraduate studies at the University of Western Australia in 1958, then studied at the University of Tasmania 1959 to 1961 where he graduated Bachelor of Science with Honours. In 1962, Melrose was awarded a Rhodes Scholarship and studied at Oxford University, UK, where he completed a Doctor of Philosophy in 1965. From 1965 to 1966, Melrose was Research Fellow in Physics at the University of Sussex, UK. From 1966 to 1968, Melrose was Research Associate in Physics at Belfer Graduate School of Sciences, Yeshiva University, New York City, USA, then research fellow in the Department of Physics and Astronomy at the University of Maryland, US, 1968–1969.

Moving back to Australia, Melrose was reader in theoretical physics at Australian National University, 1969 to 1978. Melrose was a visiting professor at the University of Colorado in 1975 and 1977. In 1979 he was appointed professor of theoretical physics at the University of Sydney. From 1991 to 1999 Melrose was the director of the Research Centre for Theoretical Astrophysics. Melrose was head of School of Physics from 2001 to 2002.

== Awards and recognition ==
Melrose has been awarded many prizes for his contribution to science.

In 1974 he was awarded the Pawsey Medal of the Australian Academy of Science.

In 1986 he was elected a Fellow of the Australian Academy of Science, and was awarded the Walter Boas Medal of the Australian Institute of Physics.

In 1987 he was awarded the Thomas Ranken Lyle Medal of the Australian Academy of Science, a career award recognising his outstanding contribution to Physics.

Melrose became honorary research fellow at the CSIRO Division of Radiophysics in 1987. Since 1990 Melrose has been an Honorary Research Fellow of the Australian Telescope National Facility.

In 1997 he became a Dozor Fellow of the Ben Gurion University of the Negev.

In 1998 Melrose was awarded the Harrie Massey Medal and Prize, jointly by the Institute of Physics and the Australian Institute of Physics.

In recognition of his outstanding contribution to the University of Sydney, Melrose was awarded the title of professor of the university, a position he has held since 2000.

In 2002 he was awarded the Centenary Medal.

In 2004 Melrose was awarded the Ellery Medal of the Astronomical Society of Australia.

In 2013 he was awarded the Moyal Medal from Macquarie University.

In 2016 Melrose was awarded the Chandrasekhar Prize in Plasma Physics by the Association of Asia Pacific Physical Societies recognising his seminal and outstanding contributions to the field of plasma physics.

== Professional contributions to science ==
Melrose has led numerous international and Australian scientific institutions and committees. He was president of Division II of the International Astronomical Union from 2006 to 2009 and president of Commission 10 during 2003 to 2006. Melrose was secretary of Commission C19 (Astrophysics), of the International Union of Pure and Applied Physics from 1996 to 2002. From 1994 to 1997 Melrose was the chair of the CSIRO Australia Telescope National Facility. He was the chair of the advisory committee of the Australian Journal of Physics from 1987 to 1993. Melrose was the inaugural chair of the Sydney Association for Astrophysics from 1985 to 1988. He was chair of the National Committee for Astronomy of Australia, Australian Academy of Science from 1980 to 1984.

Melrose has held various editorial roles at the Journal of Plasma Physics, Solar Physics, the Journal of Geophysical Research - Space Physics, Proceedings of the Astronomical Society of Australia, and the Australian Journal of Physics.

Melrose is a member of the Chandrasekhar Prize Selection Committee, at the Association of Asia Pacific Physical Societies.
