= Chennupati Jagadish =

Indian-Australian physicist

Chennupati Jagadish AC
- Born: 1957 (age 68–69); Andhra Pradesh, India
- Education: Ph.D. from University of Delhi, India (1986); M.Phil. from University of Delhi, India (1982); M.Sc.(Tech.) from Andhra University, India (1980); B.Sc. from Nagarjuna University, India (1977)
- Alma mater: University of Delhi; Queen's University; Andhra University; Acharya Nagarjuna University
- Known for: compound semiconductors and III-V based lasers
- Spouse: Vidya Jagadish
- Children: 1
- Awards: Australian Laureate Fellowship (2009); IEEE Photonics Award (2026)
- Scientific career
- Fields: Nanotechnology; Optoelectronics; Photonics; Photovoltaics; Compound Semiconductors
- Workplaces: Australian National University, Australian National Fabrication Facility
- Notable students: Hannah Joyce

Chennupati Jagadish AC (born 1957) is an Indian-Australian physicist and academic and the current president of the Australian Academy of Science, and an Emeritus Professor of Physics at the Australian National University Research School of Physics. He is head of the Semiconductor Optoelectronics and Nanotechnology Group which he established in 1990. He is also the Convener of the Australian Nanotechnology Network and Director of Australian National Fabrication Facility ACT Node.

== Education ==
Jagadish obtained his B.Sc. degree in physics from Acharya Nagarjuna University (VSR College, Tenali) in 1977, M.Sc. (Tech) in applied physics (with specialisation in electronics) from Andhra University in 1980 and M.Phil. and Ph.D. degrees in physics (semiconducting thin films) from the University of Delhi in 1982 and 1986, respectively.

== Career ==
After completing his PhD in physics at the University of Delhi, Jagadish worked at Sri Venkateswara College, New Delhi as a lecturer in Physics and Electronics during 1985–1988. He was a post-doctoral fellow at Queen's University Physics Department during 1988–1990. He moved to the Australian National University in 1990 to join the newly established Department of Electronic Materials Engineering in the Research School of Physics. He has served as vice-president and Secretary for Physical Sciences of the Australian Academy of Science (2012–2016) and was elected President of the academy in May 2022, to serve a term of four years until May 2026.

Jagadish has worked with overseas universities including the University of Oxford, University of Tokyo, IIT Delhi, IIT Hyderabad, University of Hyderabad and National Taiwan University where he holds honorary positions.

He is an active member of IEEE Australian Material Research Society where he was President (2019–2022). He was also President, IEEE Photonics Society (2018–2019), and President, IEEE Nanotechnology Council (2008–2009), and regularly speaks at international conferences and meetings on Material Sciences, Photonics, Electronics, Semiconductors, Quantum Electronics, Physics, etc. He has also delivered plenary talks, and guest talks and organised several sessions in MRS, IEEE meetings around the globe.

He is now serving as Editor-in-Chief for Applied Physics Reviews (January 2020 – present). Before joining APR, he served as Editor-in-Chief for Progress in Quantum Electronics (2016–2019), and as Co-Editor-in-Chief for the International Journal of High Speed Electronics and Systems (2014–2019). He also holds Editor position for various journals including IEEE Electron Device Letters (2008–2014), [Journal of Semiconductor Technology and Science (2009–present), Springer Series in Material Science, (2009–present), Springer Series in Nanooptics and Nanophotonics (2009–present), Elsevier Series in Semiconductors and Semimetals (2010–present), Light: Science and Applications of Nature Publishing Group, (2014–2019). He is the member of the editorial board for more than 20 other journals, including ACS Nano, IEEE Photonics Journal, IEEE Nanotechnology Magazine, Physica Status Solidi: Rapid Res. Lett., Solid State Electronics, Etc.

== Social services ==
Jagadish and his wife Vidya have launched The Chennupati and Vidya Jagadish Endowment to support students and researchers from developing countries to visit Australian National University's Research School of Physics.

== Awards ==
Jagadish has received many awards and honours including being elected a Fellow of the American Physical Society in 2003, and a Fellow The Optical Society in 2005. He was awarded the Federation Fellowship (2004–2009) and Laureate Fellowship (2009–2014) by the Australian Research Council. He was awarded the 2013 Walter Boas Medal from the Australian Institute of Physics. In 2015, he received both the IEEE Pioneer Award in Nanotechnology and the IEEE Photonics Society Engineering Achievement Award. In 2016, he received the Nick Holonyak, Jr. Award, "For pioneering and sustained contributions to quantum-well, quantum-dot and nanowire optoelectronic devices and their integration."

Jagadish was appointed a Companion of the Order of Australia for eminent services to physics and engineering in the Australia Day Honours 2016, and received the 2018 UNESCO medal for his contributions to nanoscience and nanotechnologies. In 2019, he received the Thomas Ranken Lyle Medal from the Australian Academy of Science and the Beattie Steel Medal, presented by the Australia and New Zealand Optical Society.

In 2020, he was elected an international member of the National Academy of Engineering for contributions to nanotechnology for optoelectronic devices. In 2022, he was elected as an international fellow of the UK's Royal Academy of Engineering. In 2023, the President of India conferred on Jagadish the Pravasi Bharatiya Samman Award for his "contributions to science and technology and education". This is the highest honour given to overseas Indians by the Government of India.

He was made a Foreign Member of the Chinese Academy of Sciences and elected a Fellow of the Royal Society of New South Wales in 2024 and of the Royal Society in 2025.

He has received honorary doctorates from the University of Surrey (2024) and Nottingham Trent University.

He received the 2026 IEEE Photonics Award, "for contributions to compound semiconductor nanotechnology for optoelectronic devices and impact on the Photonics community".
