= Hans A. Bachor =

German-born Australian research physicist (born 1952)

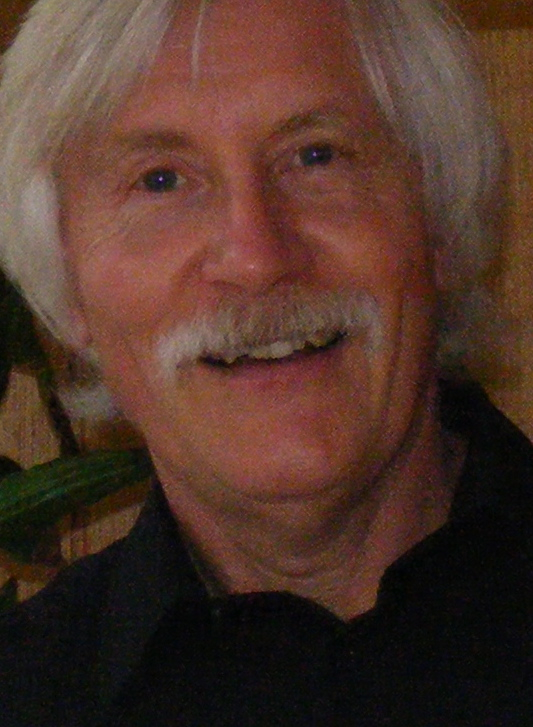
- Born: Hans Albert Bachor; December 1952 (age 72); Wolfenbüttel, Germany
- Awards: Walter Boas Medal (2000); Harrie Massey Medal and Prize (2010)
- Scientific career
- Fields: Physics (Experimental quantum optics)
- Institutions: Leibniz University Hannover; Australian National University
- Doctoral advisor: Prof. Dr. Manfred Kock

Hans-Albert Bachor AM (born December 1952) is a German-born Australian research physicist.

He was chairperson of the National Youth Science Forum in Australia, and is an emeritus professor in the Department of Quantum Science, Research School of Physics at the Australian National University, Canberra, Australia.

== Biography ==
Bachor was born in Wolfenbüttel, Germany in 1952. He studied physics in Hannover, Germany, where he received his diploma and doctorate, supervised by Prof. Dr. Manfred Kock. He took up a position at the Australian National University in 1981.

== Research ==
Bachor established experimental quantum optics in Australia and created a widely known group for optics and laser physics, exploring the possibilities of harnessing the quantum nature of light. He has pioneered techniques for sensitive measurements beyond the quantum noise limit, for the improvement of optical sensors, interferometers, optical communication and data storage.

Bachor has mentored and graduated a number of Australia's leading scientists. His former graduate students include Professor Ping Koy Lam (CQC2T), Professor Timothy Ralph (UQ), and Professor Andrew White (UQ). Bachor was head of the Department of Physics at the Australian National University in the late 1990s, and took a leading role in teaching and inspiring undergraduate students.

== Professional activities ==
He is active in the professional management of science, a former member of the expert panels of the Australian Research Council (1997–2001, 2010–2012) and the European Research Council (2009–2013), through leading roles in the Australian Optical Society, as chair and organiser of several international science conferences, and as a member of the advisory boards of international research Centres.

His awards include the Humboldt Research Prize (1999), Fellow of the Institute of Physics (UK), the Australian Institute of Physics (AIP) and the Optical Society of America (OSA). He is recipient of the AIP Walter Boas Medal (2000), the AIP award for contributions to Physics (2009), the IOP/AIP Harrie Massey Medal (2010) and the AOS Beattie Steel medal (2010). He was awarded Membership in the Order of Australia (AM) on Australia Day 2012, recognising his achievements as research scientist and educator.

He has written the widely used and cited textbook " A guide to experiments in quantum Optics", with Prof. Timothy Ralph.

Bachor lives with his wife Connie Bachor in Wamboin, NSW.
