= Peter Hannaford =

Peter Hannaford may refer to:

- Peter D. Hannaford (1932–2015), American business/political consultant and author
- Peter Hannaford (professor) (born 1939), Australian academic and university professor
