= Lan Fu (engineer) =

Chinese-Australian electronics engineer

Lan Fu is a Chinese and Australian electronics engineer whose research involves the design and fabrication of optoelectronics and quantum mechanical electronic devices, including light-emitting diodes, photodetectors, solar cells, quantum dots, nanowires, and metamaterials, especially based on III-V semiconductors. She is a professor at the Australian National University, where she heads the Department of Electronic Materials Engineering.

== Education and career ==
Fu earned a bachelor's degree from the Hefei University of Technology in 1993, and received a master's degree from the University of Science and Technology of China in Heifei in 1996. She moved to Australia for doctoral studies at the Australian National University, where she completed her Ph.D. in 2001 as a student of Chennupati Jagadish.

She continued her work at the Australian National University (ANU), supported by the Australian Research Council under an ARC postdoctoral fellowship in 2002, an ARF/QEII Fellowship in 2005, and an ARC Future Fellowship in 2012. She is a full professor at ANU, and head of the Department of Electronic Materials Engineering.

== Recognition ==
Fu was named as a 2025 Fellow of Optica, "for outstanding contributions to semiconductor materials, optoelectronic devices, and nanotechnology, and for broad leadership of the profession".
