= Deborah M Kane =

Physicist

Deborah M. Kane
- Education: University of Otago, University of St Andrews
- Awards: Women in Physics Medallist, American Institute of Physics
- Scientific career
- Fields: Laser physics, Non-linear optics, photonics, Nanotechnology
- Workplaces: Australian National University, Macquarie University, Massey University, University of Southampton
- Thesis: Atomic laser-spectroscopy in the UV and visible (1984)
- Doctoral advisors: MH Dunn
- Website: https://researchportalplus.anu.edu.au/en/persons/deb-kane

Debora M. Kane is an Honorary Professor at the Department of Electronic Materials Engineering at the Australian National University since 2022. Her research interests are in non-linear optics and laser physics. She is a Fellow of The Optical Society and has edited four books on nanotechnology, nanomaterials and semiconductor lasers.

== Early life and education ==
Kane obtained a bachelor's degree from the University of Otago in 1979. In 1983, she received her PhD from the University of St Andrews. Her thesis used optical spectroscopy techniques to study atomic transitions in various materials for applications in laser physics.

== Research and career ==
Kane began her postdoctoral career as a research fellow at the University of Southampton in 1984, working on developing techniques to improve the operation of dye lasers. In 1986, she moved to Massey University, where she became a lecturer in physics.

Kane was a faculty member at the Department of Physics at Macquarie University between 1989 and 2021, serving as Head of Department from 2003 to 2006, and later held a personal chair in Physics until the end of her tenure. Her current research spans various aspects of laser physics, particularly non-linear optics and dynamics in semiconductor lasers, how laser technologies can be used for applications in surface science studies and nanomaterial processing, and the development of new visible and ultraviolet light sources.

== Awards and honours ==
- Fellow of The Optical Society, 2017
- Chair of the IUPAC Commission on Laser Physics and Photonics, 2015-17
- Australian Institute of Physics Women in Physics Lecturer and Medallist, 2006

== Selected publications ==
Kane has co-authored over 200 academic publications and nine book chapters on laser physics. She has also edited four books: Nanomaterials: Science and Applications (2016), Nanotechnology in Australia: Showcase of Early Career Research (2011), Laser Cleaning II (2007), and Unlocking Dynamic Diversity: Optical Feedback Effects on Semiconductor Lasers (2005).
