= Raymond Volkas =

Australian theoretical particle physicist

Raymond Volkas FAA is a theoretical particle physicist from the University of Melbourne. In 2016, Raymond was awarded the Harrie Massey Medal and Prize, jointly by the Institute of Physics (UK) and the Australian Institute of Physics, for his contributions to physics. Raymond is a Redmond Barry Distinguished Professor in the School of Physics, at the University of Melbourne, where he has been a faculty member since 1993. He is the director of the Melbourne Node of the ARC Centre of Excellence for Particle Physics (established in 2011) and served as head of the School of Physics from 2014 to 2016. Some of Volkas's past awards and achievements include receiving a Queen Elizabeth II Fellowship, the Pawsey Medal which is awarded by the Australian Academy of Science, the Dean's Award for Excellence in Teaching (University of Melbourne) and a Dozor Fellowship from Ben-Gurion University in Israel. He was elected as a Fellow of the Australian Academy of Science in 2010.
