= Jane Hunter =

Jane Hunter may refer to:

- Jane Hunter (scientist), Australian scientist
- Jane Edna Hunter (1881–1971), African-American social worker
