= Hannah Joyce =

Australian scientist and engineer

- Born: Perth, Western Australia
- Citizenship: Australia
- Education: University of Western Australia; Australian National University
- Awards: Philip Leverhulme Prize in Engineering; IEEE Photonics Society Young Investigator Award; Harold M. Manasevit Young Investigator Award
- Scientific career
- Fields: Nanomaterials, nanowires, terahertz photonics, optoelectronics
- Workplaces: University of Cambridge; University of Oxford
- Thesis: Growth and Characterisation of III-V Semiconductor Nanowires for Optoelectronic Device Applications
- Doctoral advisors: Professor Chennupati Jagadish; Professor Hoe Tan
- Website: http://www3.eng.cam.ac.uk/~hjj28/index.html

Hannah J. Joyce is an Australian scientist and engineer, and a professor at the Department of Engineering at the University of Cambridge. Her research specialises in the development of new nanomaterials for applications in optoelectronics and energy harvesting. She has received several awards for her work in nanowire engineering and terahertz photonics.

== Education ==
Joyce studied a double undergraduate degree, receiving a Bachelor of Science and Bachelor of Engineering in 2005 from the University of Western Australia, specialising in pharmacology and electrical/electronic engineering.

She obtained a Ph.D. in physics from the Australian National University in 2010, where her research focused on the growth and characterisation of III-V semiconductor nanowires for applications in optoelectronic devices. She co-authored 22 publications during her doctoral studies.

== Research and career ==
Joyce stayed at ANU until 2010 to begin her postdoctoral research in the Department of Physics at the University of Oxford. She became a lecturer at the Department of Engineering at University of Cambridge in 2013, holding a Research Fellowship from the Royal Commission for the Exhibition of 1851. In 2016, she was awarded a Starting Grant from the European Research Council for her work on nitride nanowire engineering.

She is currently a professor of low-dimensional electronics at the University of Cambridge, and her research group studies the development of new nanomaterials, such as nanowires, for applications in photonic and electronic devices. She has also been a principal investigator and co-investigator on two Engineering and Physical Sciences Research Council grants to study multiplexed quantum devices and integrated circuits.

Joyce has co-authored more than 100 publications in peer-reviewed journals.

== Awards and honours ==
Joyce has been internationally recognised for her contributions towards the engineering of optoelectronic devices based on nanowires. She pioneered the use of terahertz spectroscopy for contact-free electrical characterisation of III-V semiconductor nanowires, as well as developing the first ultrafast switchable terahertz polarisation modulators.

- Young Scientist Award from the International Symposium on Compound Semiconductors, 2020
- Philip Leverhulme Prize in Engineering, 2019
- IEEE Photonics Society Young Investigator Award, 2017
- Harold M. Manasevit Young Investigator Award, 2014
