= Murray Batchelor =

Australian mathematical physicist

- Born: 27 August 1961 (age 65); Taree, New South Wales, Australia
- Education: Australian National University; University of New South Wales
- Awards: Pawsey Medal (1997); Australian Mathematical Society Medal
- Scientific career
- Fields: Mathematics, Physics
- Workplaces: Chongqing University, Australian National University

Murray Thomas Batchelor (born 27 August 1961) is an Australian mathematical physicist. He is best known for his work in mathematical physics and theoretical physics.

== Academic career ==
Batchelor was educated at Chatham Public School and Chatham High School (Taree, New South Wales). He completed an Honours degree in Theoretical Physics at the University of New South Wales in 1983, graduating with 1st class honours and a University Medal. Batchelor completed a PhD in Mathematics at the Australian National University in 1987.

His first postdoctoral research position was at the Lorentz Institute in Leiden. After a time as a postdoctoral research fellow in mathematics at the University of Melbourne he took up an Australian Research Council QEII Fellowship at the Australian National University. He then was awarded two successive ARC Senior Research Fellowships, followed by an ARC Professorial Fellowship in 2003.

Batchelor served as Head of the Department of Theoretical Physics from mid-2005 to March 2013. He has held visiting positions at a number of universities, including the University of Oxford, the University of Tokyo and Institut Henri Poincaré. He held a Visiting Fellowship at All Souls College, Oxford during Michaelmas Term 2013.

During his career, Batchelor has published over 150 peer-reviewed papers. He is a Fellow of the Australian Mathematical Society, the Australian Institute of Physics and the Institute of Physics (UK).

Batchelor was Editor-in-Chief of Journal of Physics A: Mathematical and Theoretical. Prior to this he served as Mathematical Physics Section Editor (2007–2008) and as a member of the Editorial Board (2005–2006). He is currently Topical Reviews Editor (2014-).

In 2008 Batchelor was awarded an Honorary Professorship at Chongqing University, China. He took up a full-time position there in 2013 under the Thousand Talents Plan. He is a General Council Member of the Asia-Pacific Center for Theoretical Physics.

He holds a part-time position at the Australian National University jointly between the Department of Theoretical Physics in the Research School of Physics and Engineering and the Mathematical Sciences Institute.

However, Batchelor has also shown an interest in ancient and modern stromatolites, which has led him on a number of field trips to outback Australia, including to the Pilbara Craton and to Hamelin Pool Marine Nature Reserve.

In 2018 he led research into the stones used to build Buckingham Palace, determining that they were made from 200 million year old microbes.

== Public roles ==
Batchelor served on the Mathematical and Information Sciences and Technology Assessment Panel for the Australian Research Quality Framework (2007).

== Awards ==
- University Medal, UNSW - 1983
- Pawsey Medal, Australian Academy of Science - 1997
- Australian Mathematical Society Medal - 1998
- ARC Professorial Fellowship - 2003
- Visiting Fellowship, All Souls College - 2013
- 1000 Talent Professor, China - 2013

== Selected bibliography ==
- Batchelor, Murray T. (1 January 2007). "The Bethe ansatz after 75 years". Physics Today. 60 (1). AIP Publishing: 36–40. Bibcode:2007PhT....60a..36B. doi:10.1063/1.2709557. hdl:1885/95035. ISSN 0031-9228.
- Batchelor, Murray T. (2008). "The art of sangaku". Nature Physics. 4 (9). Springer Science and Business Media LLC: 669. Bibcode:2008NatPh...4..669B. doi:10.1038/nphys1069. ISSN 1745-2473.
- Guan, Xi-Wen; Batchelor, Murray T.; Lee, Chaohong (27 November 2013). "Fermi gases in one dimension: From Bethe ansatz to experiments". Reviews of Modern Physics. 85 (4). American Physical Society (APS): 1633–1691. arXiv:1301.6446. Bibcode:2013RvMP...85.1633G. doi:10.1103/revmodphys.85.1633. ISSN 0034-6861.
