= PhotoniX =

Scientific journal

- Discipline: Photonics
- Language: English
- Edited by: Min Gu; Min Qiu; Hongbo Sun

Publication details
- History: 2020—present
- Publisher: Springer, Chinese Society for Optical Engineering
- Frequency: Annually
- Open access: Yes
- Impact factor: 18 (2025)

Standard abbreviations
- ISO 4: PhotoniX

Indexing
- ISSN: 2662-1991

Links
- Journal homepage; Online access; Online archive

PhotoniX is a peer-reviewed and open access scientific journal co-published by Springer Science+Business Media and Chinese Society for Optical Engineering in partnership with Tsinghua University, University of Shanghai for Science and Technology and Westlake University. Established in 2020, it covers developments in photonics. Its current editor-in-chiefs are Min Gu (University of Shanghai for Science and Technology), Min Qiu (Westlake University) and Hongbo Sun (Tsinghua University).

== Abstracting and indexing ==
The journal is abstracted and indexed in:

- Current Contents/Engineering, Computing & Technology
- Current Contents/Physical, Chemical & Earth Sciences
- Directory of Open Access Journals
- Ei Compendex
- Inspec
- Science Citation Index Expanded
- Scopus

According to the Journal Citation Reports, the journal has a 2025 impact factor of 18.
