= Pawsey Medal =

Australian physics award

The Pawsey Medal is awarded annually by the Australian Academy of Science to recognize outstanding research in physics by an Australian scientist early in their career (up to 10 years post-PhD).

This medal commemorates the work of the late Joseph L. Pawsey, FAA.

== Winners ==
Year	Winner	Affiliation	Location	Field	Notes
2025	Claudia Lagos	University of Western Australia		Galaxy formation and evolution	
2025	Daria Smirnova	Australian National University		Topological photonics	
2024	Jiajia Zhou	University of Technology Sydney	Sydney	Nanoparticles	
2023	Yuerui Lu	Australian National University	Canberra	Optoelectronics	
2021	Xiaojing Hao	University of New South Wales	Sydney	Photovoltaics	
2020	Adam Deller	Swinburne University of Technology	Melbourne	Radio Astronomy	
2019	Steven Flammia	University of Sydney	Sydney	Quantum information	
2018	Paul Lasky	Monash University	Melbourne	Gravitational wave astrophysics	
2017	Igor Aharonovich	University of Technology Sydney	Sydney	Quantum Physics, Photonics	
2016	Ilya Shadrivov	Australian National University	Canberra		
2015	Naomi McClure-Griffiths	Australia Telescope National Facility		Radio Astronomy	
2014	Geoffrey John Pryde	Griffith University	Brisbane	Quantum physics	
2013	Christopher Blake	Swinburne University of Technology	Melbourne	Astrophysics	
2012	Tanya Monro	University of Adelaide	Adelaide	Photonics	
2011	Bryan Gaensler	University of Sydney	Sydney	Astrophysics	
2010	Andrew G. White	University of Queensland	Brisbane	Quantum information	
2009	J. Stuart B. Wyithe	University of Melbourne	Melbourne	Astrophysics	
2008	Kostya Ostrikov	University of Sydney	Sydney	Plasma nanoscience	
2007	Ben Eggleton	University of Sydney	Sydney	Optical device physics, photonics	
2006	Mahananda Dasgupta	Australian National University	Canberra	Nuclear physics	
2005	Michelle Simmons	University of New South Wales	Sydney	Semiconductor physics	
2004	Marcela Bilek	University of Sydney	Sydney	Applied Physics	
2003	Howard M. Wiseman	Griffith University	Brisbane	Quantum physics	
2002	Sergey V. Vladimirov	University of Sydney	Sydney	Plasma physics	
2001	Brian P. Schmidt	Australian National University	Canberra	Astrophysics	
2000	Anthony B. Murphy	CSIRO	Sydney	Applied physics	
1999	C. Martijn de Sterke	University of Sydney	Sydney	Optics, photonics	
1999	Raymond R. Volkas	University of Melbourne	Melbourne	Particle physics	
1998	Igor Bray	Curtin University of Technology	Perth	Theoretical physics	
1998	Yuri S. Kivshar	Australian National University	Canberra	Nonlinear optics	
1997	Murray T. Batchelor	Australian National University	Canberra	Mathematical physics	
1996	Robert G. Elliman	Australian National University	Canberra	Solid state physics	
1995	Peter A. Robinson	University of Sydney	Sydney	Neurophysics	
1994	Peter T. H. Fisk	CSIRO	Lindfield, NSW	Metrology	
1993	Stephen T. Hyde	Australian National University	Canberra	Materials physics	
1992	David J. Hinde	Australian National University	Canberra	Nuclear physics	
1991	Andrew E. Stuchbery	Australian National University	Canberra	Nuclear physics	
1990	W. K. Hocking	University of Western Ontario	London, Ontario, Canada	Astronomy	
1989	Keith A. Nugent	University of Melbourne	Melbourne	X-ray optics	
1988	Ian N. S. Jackson	Australian National University	Canberra	Geophysics	
1987	John W. V. Storey	University of New South Wales	Sydney	Astrophysics, optics	
1986	Barry Luther-Davies	Australian National University	Canberra	Nonlinear optics	
1985	Richard M. Pashley	Murdoch University	Perth	Water resources	
1984	Peter R. Wood	Australian National University	Canberra	Astronomy	
1983	Michael A. Dopita	Australian National University	Canberra	Astronomy	
1982	James A. Piper	Macquarie University	Sydney	Photonics	
1981	Martin A. Green	University of New South Wales	Sydney	Photovoltaics	
1980	John E. Norris	Australian National University	Canberra	Astronomy	
1979	Gregory J. Clark	CSIRO (formerly)	Sydney	Nuclear Physics	
1978	Richard N. Manchester	CSIRO	Epping, NSW	Radioastronomy	
1977	Jacob N. Israelachvili	University of California, Santa Barbara	Santa Barbara, California, US	Fluid mechanics	
1976	W. Miller Goss	National Radio Astronomy Observatory	Socorro, New Mexico, US	Radioastronomy	
1975	Rodney J. Baxter	Australian National University	Canberra	Statistical mechanics	
1974	Donald B. Melrose	University of Sydney	Sydney	Astrophysics, plasma physics	
1973	Bruce H. J. McKellar	University of Melbourne	Melbourne	Theoretical physics	
1972	Ken C. Freeman	Australian National University	Canberra	Astronomy, astrophysics	
1971	Barry W. Ninham	Australian National University	Canberra	Physical chemistry	
1970	Rodney A. Challinor	Sigma Group	Saint Helier, Jersey		
1969	Kenneth G. McCracken	CSIRO	Canberra	Astronomy	
1967	Robert M. May	Oxford University	Oxford, UK	Population biology	

== See also ==
- List of physics awards
- List of Australian Science and Technology Awards
