= Gregory John Clark =

Australian physicist and business executive

Gregory John Clark AC
- Born: February 1943 (age 83)
- Education: University of Tasmania; Australian National University
- Awards: Pawsey Medal (1979); Companion of the Order of Australia (2018)
- Scientific career
- Fields: Mineral physics
- Thesis: (1962)

Gregory John Clark AC (born February 1943) is an Australian physicist and business executive. His research focused on the field of high-pressure mineral physics. Subsequently, his business career included senior management roles at News Corporation, Loral Space and Communications, ANZ Banking Group, NextDC, and KaComm Communications. He was awarded the Pawsey Medal in 1979 for his research, and in 2018, he was appointed as a Companion of the Order of Australia.

== Early life and education ==
Clark was born in February 1943 in the Australian state of Tasmania, where he grew up. He earned his First Class Honours degree in physics from the University of Tasmania and a Ph.D. in Nuclear Physics from the Australian National University in 1968. His thesis focused on the properties of crystals under high pressures and temperatures.

== Career ==
After completing his Ph.D., Clark went to the United Kingdom where he was a Harwell Fellow at the United Kingdom Atomic Energy Authority from 1969 to 1972. Returning to Australia, he was a Principal Research Scientist at the CSIRO Division of Mineral Physics from 1973 to 1980. While there, he also took on the role of Visiting Principal Scientist for Oak Ridge National Laboratory, United States Atomic Energy Agency from 1976 to 1977. In his research, Clark made significant contributions to the field of mineral physics, particularly in the areas of high-pressure physics and geophysics, phase transformations and crystallography. He also conducted research in the area of diamond anvil cells, which are devices used to study materials at very high pressures. He bombarded materials with nuclear particles to find new information about their properties, including determining the location of trace elements in mineral grains, deficiencies of chromium in human blood, the quality of uranium ores, the structure of solar absorber surfaces, properties of semi-conducting materials, and trace analysis of air pollutants. From 1980 to 1993, Clark worked as director of science and technology (Australia) and research scientist at the IBM Research Division, Yorktown Heights, in New York before developing a business management career.

After completing his research roles, Clark broadened his roles in business senior management. In 1993, he joined News Corporation, a multinational mass media company. At News Corporation, Clark served as the president of technology, where he was responsible for transforming its assets for program creation and media delivery from analogue to digital platforms, across film, print, and television. Clark then moved on to become the president and chief operating officer of Loral Space and Communications, the world's largest commercial satellite manufacturer. During his tenure, he was credited with turning around the struggling company and making it profitable. Clark also served on the board of the ANZ Banking Group, one of Australia's largest banks, from 2004 to 2013. He founded and served as the chairman of KaComm Communications in 2006, a company that provided satellite-based communication solutions to businesses and governments around the world.

=== Service ===
In addition to his corporate roles, Clark has had active roles on the boards of diverse public and professional service organisations. These include serving on the National ICT Australia Review Board since 2006, being on the council of the Royal Institution of Australia since 2010, chairman of the advisory board to the A.R.C. Centre for Ultrahigh Bandwidth Devices for Optical Systems since 2011, a Councillor at the University of Sydney Physics Foundation since 2013, chairman of the Commercial and Philanthropic Development Board, Australian National University's School of Physical Sciences and Engineering since 2013, and a board member at Questacon National Science and Technology Centre since 2014.

== Awards and honours ==
In 1979, Clark was awarded the Pawsey Medal by the Australian Academy of Science, in recognition of his contributions to the field of mineral physics. The Pawsey Medal is awarded to a scientist under the age of 36 years for distinguished research in experimental physics. He later received the Reginald A. Fessenden Award from the Canadian Geophysical Union in 1992, and the Mineralogical Society of America Award in 2003. In 2012 he was inducted into the Hall of Fame of the Pearcey Foundation.

The Australian government awarded him the Centenary Medal in 2001 for service to Australian society in technology and communications. He received the Israeli Government's Einstein Medal in 2005. In 2018, he was awarded a Companion of the Order of Australia (AC) "for eminent service to science as a physicist, researcher and academic in the area of technological development and communications, to business as an innovator and enabler of emerging technologies, and to the promotion of philanthropy".

He was elected as a fellow of the American Physical Society in 1988, the New York Explorers Club in 1989, the Australian Academy of Technological Sciences and Engineering in 1991, and the Australian Academy of Science in 2021.
