= Kirrily Rule =

Australian instrument scientist

- Kirrily Rule, 2026
- Education: Monash University
- Occupations: Physicist and instrument scientist
- Employer: ANSTO
- Title: Professor

Kirrily Rule is an Australian instrument scientist and is one of the three people responsible for the thermal triple-axis spectrometer (TAIPAN) which is located at Australian Nuclear Science and Technology Organisation (ANSTO). She is also an honorary professor in physics at the University of Wollongong.

== Early Years ==
“I had an insatiable curiosity and was always the kid who asked, ‘but why?’” she says.

== Education ==
Although she knew she wanted to study Physics, initially Rule undertook her bachelors degree at Monash University completing a combined Arts and Science degree, majoring in psychology and drama, before going on to complete her honours and PhD in Physics.

== Career ==
Following Rule's PhD she completed a postdoctoral fellowship at McMaster University in Canada before moving to Germany where she worked for eight years as an instrument scientist for Helmholtz-Zentrum Berlin.

Returning to Australia Rule took a role with ANSTO where, working with the thermal triple-axis spectrometer (TAIPAN), she helps researchers use neutron scattering to explore the structure and dynamics of materials.

Rule values the ability to work with and alongside other scientists but her own research focuses of novel and low dimensional magnetic materials.

She has previously served as the Honorary Secretary of the Australian Institute of Physics.

== Publications ==
Rule has over 4,300 citations, an H index of 33, and over 100 publications, as at November 2026. She has published in the journals Science, on magnetic monopoles, in 2009, and Nature, on complex phonon interactions, in 2026. Select publications include:

- Yuanwen Feng, Lin Xie, Seiko Ohira-Kawamura, Ji Qi, Dehong Yu, Dan Huang, Haoyu Wang, Kirrily C. Rule, Bingqi Linghu, Jie Zhu, Dawei Tang, Yanxu Wang, Jiaqing He, Bing Li; Coexisting Liquid-, Glassy-, and Crystal-like Phonons in a Crystalline Solid. Journal American Chemical Society 2026. https://doi.org/10.1021/jacs.6c17837.
- Md. Rezoanur Rahman, Caleb Stamper, Kyle A. Portwin, Xiaolin Wang, Richard A. Mole, Pablo Galaviz, Aiswarya Pradeepkumar, Kirrily C. Rule, Dehong Yu, David L. Cortie; Comparing the phonons and vibrations in carbon allotropes with neutron spectroscopy: Microdiamond, few-layer graphene, and amorphous fibers. Appl. Phys. Lett. 23 March 2026; 128 (12): 122204. https://doi.org/10.1063/5.0314605.

== Awards ==
- 2026 - Women in Leadership award, from the Australian Institute of Physics.
- 2022 - ANBUG Neutron award for outstanding research in neutron science and leadership.
