= Matthew Flinders Medal and Lecture =

Awarded by the Australian Academy of Science

The Matthew Flinders Medal and Lecture of the Australian Academy of Science is awarded biennially to recognise exceptional research by Australian scientists in the physical sciences. Nominations can only be made by Academy Fellows.

== Recipients ==
Source: Australian Academy of Science

- 2025 – Yuri Kivshar
- 2023 – Lidia Morawska
- 2021 – A. Holmes
- 2019 – R. Manchester
- 2017 – B. Ninham
- 2015 – K. Lambeck
- 2013 – K. Freeman
- 2011 – B. Kennett
- 2009 – B.H.J. McKellar
- 2007 – P.G. Hall
- 2005 – R.D. Ekers
- 2002 – A. McL. Sargeson
- 2000 – D.V. Boger
- 1998 – W. Compston
- 1996 – W.R. Blevin
- 1994 – N.S. Hush
- 1992 – B.D.O. Anderson
- 1990 – J.S. Turner
- 1988 – R.D. Brown
- 1986 – J.N. Israelachvili
- 1984 – B.H. Neumann
- 1982 – R. Hanbury Brown
- 1980 – A. Walsh
- 1978 – A.E. Ringwood
- 1976 – C.H.B. Priestley
- 1974 – J.P. Wild
- 1972 – A.J. Birch
- 1969 – K.E. Bullen
- 1967 – F.J. Fenner
- 1965 – J.S. Anderson
- 1963 – J.C. Eccles
- 1961 – M.L. Oliphant
- 1959 – F.M. Burnet
- 1957 – J.L. Pawsey

== See also ==
- List of general science and technology awards
- Prizes named after people
