= Xiaojing Hao =

Australian academic and engineer

Xiaojing Hao is an academic and engineer. She completed her PhD in Photovoltaic and Renewable Energy Engineering in 2010 at University of New South Wales. She is currently working as a professor in school of Photovoltaic and Renewable Energy Engineering at University of New South Wales. Her main research focus is in low-cost, high-efficiency thin film solar cells and tandem solar cells. Her research contributes to make photovoltaics cells affordable, greener and more efficient.

Xiaojing's research is focused on kesterite, an earth-abundant and non-toxic material which is used for the production of thin-film solar panels with a conversion efficiency of 11%.

She was awarded the Malcolm McIntosh Prize for Physical Scientist of the Year in 2020 for her research contributions in thin-film solar cells. She was also the recipient of the 2021 Australian Academy of Science Pawsey Medal. She was elected a Fellow of the Australian Academy of Technological Sciences & Engineering in 2022 and of the Australian Academy of Science in 2025.

In 2025, she was awarded an Australian Laureate Fellowship by the Australian Research Council to further her research on tandem solar cells.
