= Naomi McClure-Griffiths =

American astrophysicist and radio astronomer

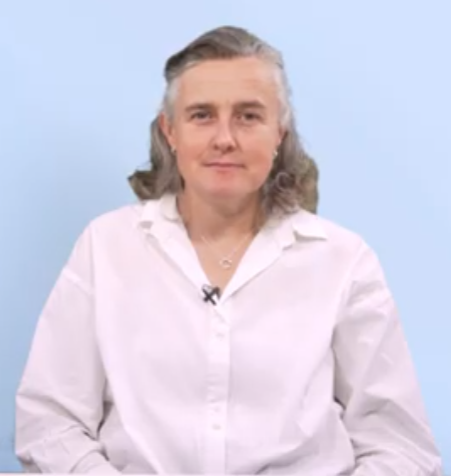
- In an "Ask an astrophysicist" video in 2023
- Born: Naomi Melissa McClure-Griffiths; July 11, 1975 (age 51); Atlanta, Georgia, United States
- Education: Oberlin College (BA); University of Minnesota (PhD)
- Known for: discovering a new arm of the Milky Way
- Spouse: David McConnell
- Scientific career
- Workplaces: CSIRO; Australian National University
- Doctoral advisor: John Dickey

Naomi McClure-Griffiths FAA (born July 11, 1975) is an American-born Australian astrophysicist and radio astronomer. She is the first Chief Scientist of the Square Kilometre Array Observatory. In 2004, McClure-Griffiths discovered a new spiral arm in the Milky Way galaxy. She was awarded the Prime Minister's Malcolm McIntosh Prize for Physical Scientist in 2006 and in 2015 was honored for her research in physics by receipt of the Pawsey Medal from the Australian Academy of Science. This was followed by an Australian Laureate Fellowship in 2021, while in 2022 she was elected a Fellow of the Australian Academy of Science.

== Early life and education ==
Naomi Melissa McClure-Griffiths was born on July 11, 1975, in Atlanta Georgia. She entered Oberlin College in 1993 where she studied both French and physics and then in 1997 entered the University of Minnesota to study astrophysics. During her PhD, she participated in the International Galactic Plane Survey, leading the Southern Galactic Plane Survey to map the hydrogen gas in the Milky Way.

== Career ==
In 2001, she relocated permanently to Australia taking up a post doctoral fellowship at the Australia Telescope National Facility as a CSIRO Bolton Fellow. During her fellowship, McClure-Griffiths studied the movement of interstellar gases and how explosions of stars create bubbles or shells which push the gasses out of the galaxy. In their movement, chimneys of empty space may be created, two of which were discovered by McClure-Griffiths. One of the chimneys she discovered is the only known chimney to "extend through the top and bottom of the galactic plane". Then in 2004, she discovered a new spiral arm during her senior postdoctoral position. The new arm was shown on previous mappings but never identified nor given a name. McCure-Griffiths created a computer model to confirm its existence which was confirmed by her team.

In 2006, Naomi McClure-Griffiths was honored with the Malcolm McIntosh Prize for Physical Scientist of the year one of the annual prizes awarded as the Prime Minister's Prizes for Science. As Principal Investigator she initiated the Galactic All Sky Survey that same year and then in 2007, she was the recipient of the Powerhouse Wizard Award from the Powerhouse Museum at the Sydney Observatory. McClure-Griffiths' team took part in the international effort to complete the mapping of the Milky Way's magnetic fields in 2011. In 2015, she left CSIRO and joined the Australian National University as a professor conducting her research from the Mount Stromlo Observatory. That same year, her work in physics was recognized by receipt of the Pawsey Medal from the Australian Academy of Science. McClure-Griffiths was elected a Fellow of the Australian Academy of Science in 2022 for her contributions to our understanding of the atomic hydrogen gas distribution in our Milky Way and the Magellanic Clouds through observational surveys with Australian radio telescopes.

McClure-Griffiths was appointed the first Chief Scientist of the Square Kilometre Array Observatory in July 2025.

== Selected works ==
- McClure-Griffiths, N. M.; Dickey, John M.; et al. (June 2000). "Two Large H I Shells in the Outer Galaxy near l = 279°". The Astronomical Journal. 119 (6): 2828–2842. arXiv:astro-ph/0003158. Bibcode:2000AJ....119.2828M. doi:10.1086/301413. S2CID 17845732.
- McClure-Griffiths, N. M.; Green, A. J.; et al. (April 2001). "The Southern Galactic Plane Survey: The Test Region". The Astrophysical Journal. 551 (1): 394–412. arXiv:astro-ph/0012302. Bibcode:2001ApJ...551..394M. doi:10.1086/320095. S2CID 16776986.
- McClure-Griffiths, N. M.; Dickey, John M.; et al. (September 2003). "Loops, Drips, and Walls in the Galactic Chimney GSH 277+00+36". The Astrophysical Journal. 594 (2): 833–843. Bibcode:2003ApJ...594..833M. doi:10.1086/377152.
- McClure-Griffiths, N. M.; Dickey, John M.; et al. (June 2004). "A Distant Extended Spiral Arm in the Fourth Quadrant of the Milky Way". The Astrophysical Journal. 607 (2): L127–L130. arXiv:astro-ph/0404448. Bibcode:2004ApJ...607L.127M. doi:10.1086/422031. S2CID 119327129.
- McClure-Griffiths, N. M.; Ford, Alyson; et al. (February 2006). "Evidence for Chimney Breakout in the Galactic Supershell GSH 242-03+37". The Astrophysical Journal. 638 (1): 196–205. arXiv:astro-ph/0510304. Bibcode:2006ApJ...638..196M. doi:10.1086/498706. S2CID 18152301.
- McClure-Griffiths, N. M.; Dickey, John M. (December 2007). "Milky Way Kinematics. I. Measurements at the Subcentral Point of the Fourth Quadrant". The Astrophysical Journal. 671 (1): 427–438. arXiv:0708.0870. Bibcode:2007ApJ...671..427M. doi:10.1086/522297. S2CID 17387401.
- McClure-Griffiths, N. M.; Pisano, D. J.; et al. (April 2009). "Gass: The Parkes Galactic All-Sky Survey. I. Survey Description, Goals, and Initial Data Release". The Astrophysical Journal Supplement Series. 181 (2): 398–412. arXiv:0901.1159. Bibcode:2009ApJS..181..398M. doi:10.1088/0067-0049/181/2/398. S2CID 119248195.
- McClure-Griffiths, N. M.; Madsen, G. J.; et al. (December 2010). "Measurement of a Magnetic Field in a Leading Arm High-velocity Cloud". The Astrophysical Journal. 725 (1): 275–281. arXiv:1009.5849. Bibcode:2010ApJ...725..275M. doi:10.1088/0004-637X/725/1/275. S2CID 118463612.
- McClure-Griffiths, N. M.; Green, J. A.; et al. (June 2013). "Atomic Hydrogen in a Galactic Center Outflow". The Astrophysical Journal Letters. 770 (1): L4. arXiv:1304.7538. Bibcode:2013ApJ...770L...4M. doi:10.1088/2041-8205/770/1/L4. S2CID 119113867.
