= William Compston =

Australian geophysicist (1931–2025)

William (Bill) Compston FAA, FRS (19 February 1931 – 16 May 2025) was an Australian geophysicist. He was a visiting fellow at the Australian National University.

Compston developed the sensitive high-resolution ion microprobe (SHRIMP), for isotopic analyses of geological samples. SHRIMP enabled the world's oldest rock to be identified in Western Australia.

== Honours and awards ==
- 2001 Centenary Medal from the Government of Australia
- 1998 Matthew Flinders Medal and Lecture of the Australian Academy of Science
- 1988 Mawson Medal and Lecture of the Australian Academy of Science
