= Bruce McKellar =

Australian theoretical particle physicist

Bruce McKellar AC
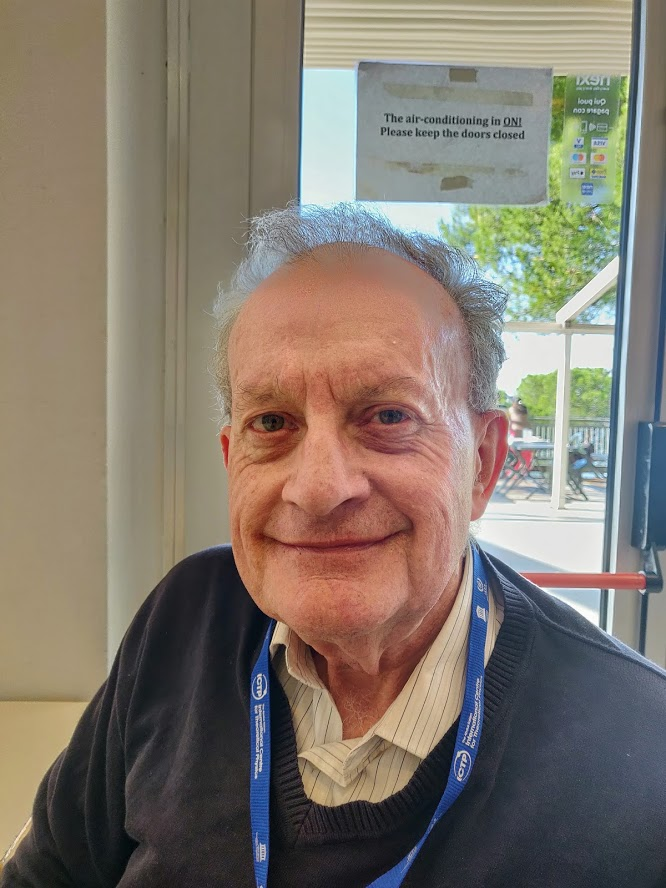
- Professor Bruce Harold John McKellar in 2019
- Born: Bruce Harold John McKellar; 1941; Forbes, New South Wales
- Education: University of Sydney (PhD 1965)
- Spouse: Loris Huckel
- Awards: Companion of the Order of Australia (AC) (2014); Matthew Flinders Medal and Lecture, Australian Academy of Science (2009); Harrie Massey Medal and Prize, Institute of Physics (UK) (2006)
- Scientific career
- Workplaces: The University of Melbourne
- Doctoral advisor: Stuart Thomas Butler

Professor Bruce Harold John McKellar AC (born 1941) is an Australian theoretical particle physicist who is Honorary Professorial Fellow at the Centre of Excellence for Particle Physics at the Terascale (CoEPP) in the School of Physics at The University of Melbourne. The International Union of Pure and Applied Physics (IUPAP) elected him as its President-Designate in 2012. In November 2014, McKellar became President of IUPAP, the first-ever Australian to take on this role.

McKellar is a theoretical particle physicist who is known for his work on particle physics and many other fields such as nuclear physics and cosmology. His other work has had applications in photography, atmospheric physics and geophysics, as well as implications for pure mathematics.

On Australia Day (26 January 2014), McKellar was appointed a Companion of the Order of Australia (AC) by Governor-General Quentin Bryce, for his service to science, particularly theoretical physics, as an academic, educator and researcher, through seminal contributions to scientific development organisations, and as an author and mentor. The AC is Australia's highest civilian honour.

== Early years and education ==
McKellar grew up in Bedgerabong in NSW, attending Bedgerabong Primary School, which was then a one-teacher school. His father was the teacher. He then attended Forbes High School before moving to Sydney at 16 to study a Bachelor of Science at the University of Sydney, which he completed with First Class Honours and the University Medal for Physics.

He received his PhD from the University of Sydney in 1965, and a Doctor of Science from the University of Melbourne in 1976.

== Academic career ==
Immediately on completion of his PhD, McKellar was appointed as a lecturer at the University of Sydney. In 1965, McKellar was invited by J. Robert Oppenheimer to become a member of the Institute for Advanced Study, Princeton, USA, which he undertook from 1966 to 1968. He then returned to the University of Sydney. In 1972, at the age of 30, McKellar was appointed as the Professor of Theoretical Physics at Melbourne University. He retired from this role in 2007.

He has held visiting positions at the French Atomic Energy Commission, Saclay (France), the TRIUMF Laboratories (Canada), the University of Washington (Seattle United States), the Los Alamos Laboratory (United States), CERN (Switzerland), the Yukawa Institute (Japan), the National Taiwan University, the National University of Singapore, the Australian National University and the University of Adelaide.

At Princeton, McKellar began his work on weak interactions, calculating the parity violation expected in nuclei. He also started his work on three and many body nuclear forces. It was characteristic of this work that he was applying the current algebra techniques of particle physics to obtain results about nuclei. During his time at the University of Melbourne, McKellar and his collaborators published their definitive study on three-nucleon forces, famously known as the "Tucson-Melbourne" force. His work on weak interactions led to the calculation of the electric dipole moments expected for the nucleon and atoms in various models of these interactions. This work then evolved into studies of related effects in the B meson system.

McKellar and his students also did foundational work on the behaviour of neutrinos propagating through a dense background of neutrinos as one finds in the early universe. He is well known for the "He McKellar Wilkens" phase, a seminal quantum physics result predicted by He and McKellar and Wilkens (independently) in 1993–94.

McKellar has made a significant contribution to the development of the study of physics in Australia. He was elected a Fellow of the Australian Academy of Science in 1987, was its Vice President for Physical Sciences from 2000–2004 and its Foreign Secretary from 2004–2006. He was a founding member of the Australian Research Council, playing a key role in both its establishment and development.

McKellar actively facilitates physics research, policy development and international collaboration globally, especially in the Asia-Pacific Region. He served on the board of trustees of the SIA Pacific Centre for Theoretical Physics and on the Council of the Association of Asia Pacific Physical Societies for many years. He chaired the Regional Committee for Asia and the Pacific of the International Council for Science (ICSU) (2009–2011), as well as the Australia and New Zealand Association for the Advancement of Science (ANZAAS) (1992–1998).

McKellar is a Fellow of the Australian Institute of Physics, the Institute of Physics (UK), the American Physical Society, and the Australian Academy of Science.

== Awards and honours ==
- 2014: Companion of the Order of Australia
- 2009: Matthew Flinders Medal and Lecture, Australian Academy of Science
- 2006: Harrie Massey Medal and Prize, Institute of Physics (UK) and the Australian Institute of Physics
- 2001: Centenary Medal
- 1992: Walter Boas Medal, Australian Institute of Physics
- 1991: Thomas Ranken Lyle Medal, Australian Academy of Science
- 1987: Fellow of the Australian Academy of Science
- 1977: Research Medal, Royal Society of Victoria
- 1973: Pawsey Medal, Australian Academy of Science
- 1962: University Medal, University of Sydney

== Personal life ==
Bruce McKellar married Loris Huckel in 1963. They have 2 children and 4 grandchildren and live in Melbourne, Australia.

== Selected publications ==
- McKELLAR, B.H.J. — The One Pion Exchange Contribution to the Weak Parity Violating Nucleon-Nucleon Potential. Physics Letters 26B: 107 – 108 (1967).
- McKELLAR, B.H.J. and RAJARAMAN, R. — Three Body Forces in Nuclear Matter. Physical Review Letters 21: 450 – 453 (1968).
- LASSEY, K.R. and McKELLAR, B.H.J. — Parity Non Conservation in (n, p) Capture at Thermal Energies: The influence of Strong and Weak Interactions. Nuclear Physics A 260: 413 – 445 (1976).
- COON, S.A., SCADRON, M.D., McNAMEE, P.C., BARRETT, B.R., BLATT, D.W.E., and McKELLAR, B.H.J. — The Two Pion Exchange Three Nucleon Potential and Nuclear Matter. Nuclear Physics A 317: 242 — 287 (1979). This is the Tucson Melbourne Force paper.
- McKELLAR, B.H.J. — The Influence of Mixing of Finite Mass Neutrinos on Beta Decay Spectra. Physics Letters 97B: 93 – 94 (1980).
- McKELLAR, B.H.J., and GIBSON, B.F. — Nonmesonic decay of Heavy Λ-Hypernuclei. Physical Review C 30: 322 – 330 (1984)
- R.D.C. MILLER, and McKELLAR, B.H.J. — Effective Field Theory and Weak Non Leptonic Interactions. Physics Reports 106: 169 — 296 (1984).
- McKELLAR, B.H.J., CHOUDHURY, S.R., HE, X-G and PAKVASA, S. — The Neutron Electric Dipole Moment in the Standard KM Model. Physics Letters 197 B: 556 – 560 (1987).
- HE, X.-G., McKELLAR, B.H.J. and PAKVASA, S. — The Neutron Electric Dipole Moment. International Journal of Modern Physics A 4: 5011 – 5046 (1989), erratum A6: 1063 (1991)
- HE, XIAO-GANG, and McKELLAR, B.H.J. — Topological Phase Due to Electric Dipole Moment and Magnetic Monopole Interaction. Physical Review A 47: 3424 – 3245 (1993)
- McKELLAR, BRUCE H.J. and THOMSON, M.J. — Oscillating Neutrinos in the Early Universe. Physical Review D 49: 2710 – 2728 (1994)
- STEPHENSON, G. J. Jr, GOLDMAN T., and McKELLAR, B. H. J. — Neutrino Clouds. International Journal of Modern Physics A 13, 2765 – 2790 (1998)
- HE, X.-G., McKELLAR, B.H.J. Hadron decay amplitudes from B ---> K π and B ---> π π decays, ArXiv:hep-ph/0410098; (2004).
