= Robert Delbourgo =

Australian physicist

- Education: Imperial College; University of London
- Awards: Walter Boas Medal (1988); Thomas Ranken Lyle Medal (1989); Harrie Massey Medal (2002)
- Scientific career
- Fields: Physics
- Workplaces: University of Tasmania
- Doctoral advisor: Abdus Salam
- Doctoral students: Peter D. Jarvis

Robert Delbourgo (born 11 November 1940) is an Australian physicist, winner of the Walter Boas Medal in 1988.

Delbourgo was educated at the Imperial College of Science and Technology (BSc (Hons) 1960, PhD 1963) and University of London (DSc 1976). His PhD was obtained under the supervision of Abdus Salam (who won the Nobel Prize in Physics in 1979). Salam and Delbourgo have co-authored 30 research publications.

Delbourgo became a Research Associate, University of Wisconsin 1963 to 1964; Research Scientist, International Centre for Theoretical Physics 1964 to 1965; Lecturer in Physics, Imperial College 1966 to 1972, Reader 1972 to 1976; Professor of Physics, University of Tasmania 1976 to about 2001, Emeritus Professor from about 2001. Fellow, Australian Institute of Physics 1977; Fellow, Australian Academy of Science 1988; Walter Boas Medal, Australian Institute of Physics 1988; Lyle Medal, Australian Academy of Science 1989. Chairman, Tasmanian Branch, Australian Institute of Physics 1992 to 1993; Chairman, National Committee for Physics 1994 to 1997.

== Selected publications ==
- Physics off the Beaten Track: A Selection of Papers by Robert Delbourgo, World Scientific, 2019.
- An Eventful Journey to Unification of All the Fundamental Forces, by Robert Delbourgo, World Scientific, 2020. A small book for science enthusiasts.
- "The relativity of space-time-property", by Robert Delbourgo, invited talk given at the Conference in Honour of the 90th Birthday of Freeman Dyson, Institute of Advanced Studies, Nanyang Technological University, Singapore, 26–29 August 2013
