= John White (chemist) =

Australian chemist

Professor John White AO CMG FRS FAA FRACI FAIP
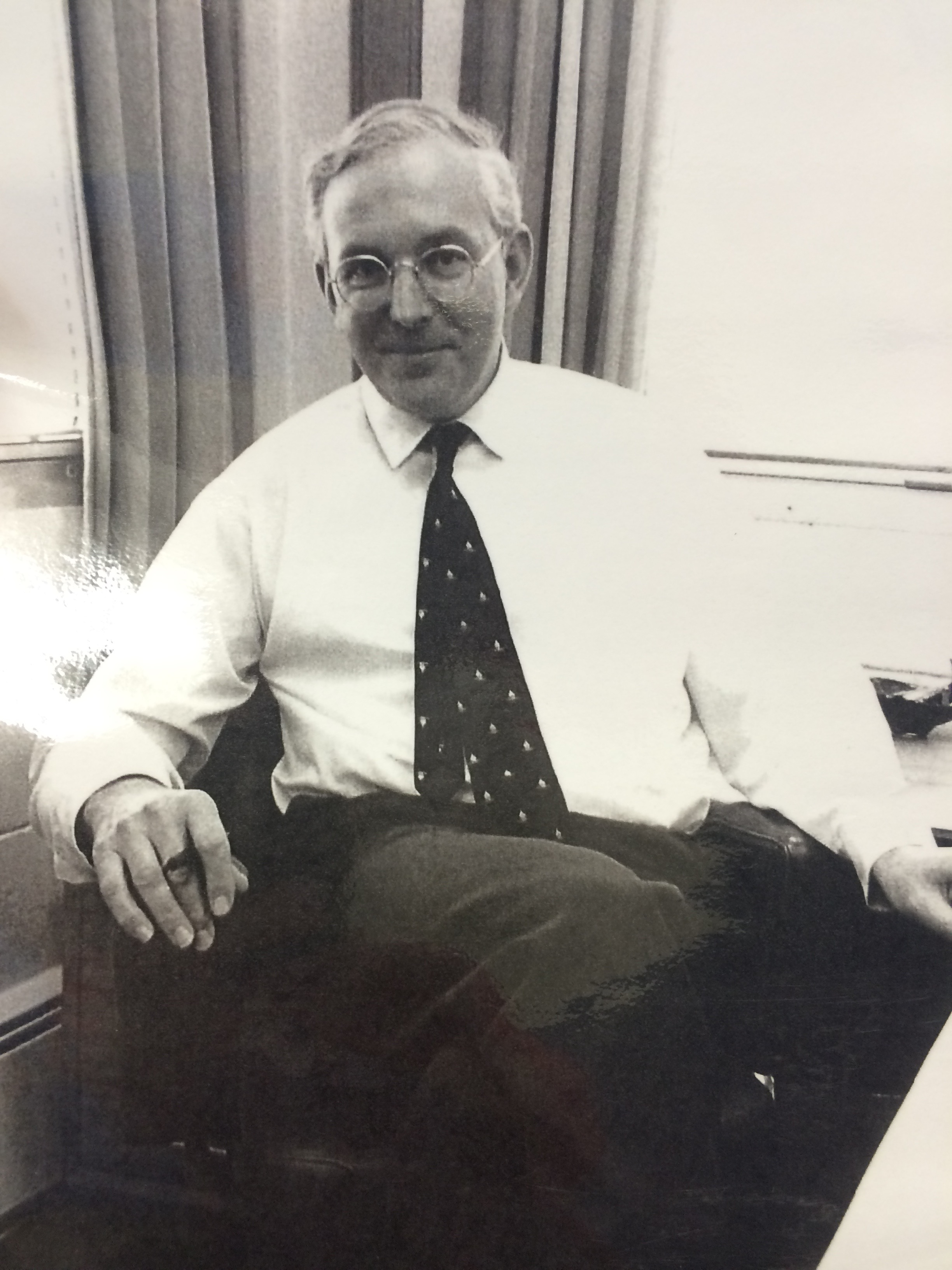

Personal details
- Born: John William White; 25 April 1937
- Died: 16 August 2023 (aged 86)
- Occupation: Chemist

John William White (25 April 1937 – 16 August 2023) was an Australian chemist who was Professor of Physical and Theoretical Chemistry, Research School of Chemistry, at the Australian National University.

White was a past president of Royal Australian Chemical Institute and president of Australian Institute of Nuclear Science and Engineering. He held the Argonne Fellowship (U. of Chicago) and was for many years a Fellow of St John's College, Oxford. Between 1975 and 1981 he was director of the Institut Laue-Langevin, Grenoble, France. He was a founding member of the International Society for Science and Religion White died on 16 August 2023, at the age of 86.

== Research ==
White and his team have developed a simple method to produce a stable, thin (~90 Å) oil film on the surface of pure water, suitable for direct measurements of the oil-water interface using ellipsometry, X-ray or neutron reflectometry, or other experimental methods. Related research investigates nanoparticle interactions with protein. The public health implications of this research have also been evaluated.

== Honours and awards ==
White was awarded fellowships of the Royal Society of Chemistry (1982), the Royal Australian Chemical Institute (1986), the Australian Institute of Physics (1986), the Royal Society of London (1993) and the Australian Academy of Science (1991). He has received the H. G. Smith Medal (1997), the Craig Medal (2005), the Leighton Medal (2005) and the AONSA Prize (2015).

White was awarded the Centenary Medal in 2001 and appointed an Officer of the Order of Australia in 2016.
