= Peter D. Jarvis =

Australian physicist

- Education: Imperial College; University of Adelaide
- Scientific career
- Fields: Physicist
- Workplaces: University of Tasmania
- Doctoral advisor: Robert Delbourgo

Peter D. Jarvis is an Australian physicist notable for his work on applications of group theory to physical problems, particularly supersymmetry in the genetic code. He has also applied classical invariant theory to problems of quantum physics (entanglement measures for mixed state systems), and also to phylogenetic reconstruction (entanglement measures, including distance measures, for taxonomic pattern frequencies).

== Education ==
Jarvis obtained his BSc and MSc from the University of Adelaide. He also has a PhD from Imperial College, London, where he studied under Robert Delbourgo, for a thesis entitled Noise Voltages Produced by Flux Motion in Superconductors.

== Career ==
Jarvis works at the School of Mathematics and Physics, at the University of Tasmania. His main focus is on algebraic structures in mathematical physics and their applications, especially combinatorial Hopf algebras in integrable systems and quantum field theory.

== See also ==
- Quantum Aspects of Life
