= Muhammad Usman (academic) =

Australian quantum physicist

- Citizenship: Australia
- Education: Purdue University
- Known for: Quantum Machine Learning, Quantum Error Correction, Quantum Computing
- Awards: Fellow Institute of Physics UK, Fellow Australian Institute of Physics, Fulbright Fellow USA
- Scientific career
- Fields: Quantum computing
- Workplaces: CSIRO, University of Melbourne, Monash University, RMIT, University of Queensland, University of Sydney.

Muhammad Usman is an Australian quantum physicist who is the head of Quantum Systems and senior principal staff member at CSIRO's Data61. He has academic associations with the University of Melbourne since 2014 and with Monash University since 2023, where he is an honorary associate professor and adjunct associate professor respectively, as well as at RMIT, where he is a full professor since 2025. He is an associate investogator at the University of Queensland, ARC Center of Excellence in Quantum Biotechnology (QUBIC) and a partner investigator in ARC Training Center for Future Leaders in Quantum Computing (FLiQC).

He is also an advocate for STEM education and has been promoting quantum education among school children as part of the CSIRO’s STEM Scientists in Schools program. He was formerly an IBM Q Hub Academic.

== Career ==
Usman is a Fellow of the Institute of Physics UK since 2026 and a Fellow of the Australian Institute of Physics (FAIP) since 2024. He is an awards officer and a member of the Federal Executive Board at the Australian Institute of Physics. He also serves on the executive editorial boards of several journals including ACM Computing Surveys, Springer Nature Quantum Machine Intelligence, IOP Nano Futures, IOP Modelling and Simulations in Materials Science and Engineering, and Nature Scientific Reports. He is a committee member of Standards Australia (JTC-3 Quantum), in which he represents CSIRO. In 2026, Usman became the member of the Australian National Committee for Physics with the Australian Academy of Science.

In 2025, he joined The von Neumann Commission as one of the commissioners, which is an independent research commission funded through a grant from the office of the Eric Schmidt investigating the potential of the quantum computing. He was the chair of Organising Committee (Conference General Chair) of the International Conference on Quantum Techniques in Machine Learning in 2024, and also served on the scientific committee of the IWCE international conference. He is a steering committee member of the International Conference on Quantum Techniques and of the Next Generation Quantum Graduate Program. He is also an advisory committee member of the Next Generation Quantum Graduate Program.

He is a guest editor of Quantum Technologies for Healthcare Nature Scientific Reports, QTML 2024 Topical Collection Special Issue at Springer Nature Quantum Machine Intelligence journal, and IOP Nano Futures for Focus on Horizon 2025: Development Trends and Future Challenges in nano-science. In 2026, he was an organiser of the Quantum Computing Summer School at RMIT.

He was formerly an invited international referee for the Swiss National Science Foundation (SNSF), the US Department of Energy (DOE) Office of Science, the Engineering Research Council of Canada (NSERC), the Dutch Research Council, and for Quantum Information Science Enabled Discovery (QUANTISED 2.0) for High Energy Physics.

He is also a member of the American Physical Society (APS), the Materials Research Society (MRS), Engineers Australia, the Network for Computational Nanotechnology (NCN) and the Institute of Electrical and Electronics Engineers (IEEE) societies.

== Research ==
Usman leads a team of researchers working in the areas of quantum algorithms, quantum software engineering, and quantum security. His research aims to utilise quantum computing methods to revolutionise next generation technologies. It spans the areas of quantum algorithms, quantum software engineering, and quantum cybersecurity.

His research focuses to advance practicality of quantum computing technologies, including finding its applications in the optimisation of transport for the Olympic Games, advances in environmental science and decarbonisation, early stage medical diagnostics for diseases, agricultural monitoring, data science, astronomy, materials chemistry, the discovery of new medicine, and in security in the defence force and in self-driving vehicles, as well as in the general area of artificial intelligence. These applications all leverage the use of quantum entanglement. His work has also leveraged the use of AI.

A study led by Usman marked the first time anyone has been able to pinpoint the location of an atom, as well as those of atom-sized quantum bits. His research has also improved semiconductor manufacturing This has demonstrated that quantum circuits for data encoding in quantum machine learning can be greatly simplified without compromising their accuracy or strength. He is the editor of the book, Quantum Robustness in Artificial Intelligence which was published in April 2026 by the Springer Nature as part of the Quantum Science and Technology series.

== Awards ==
Usman's work on Quantum Machine Learning was the winner of the State of Victoria iAward 2024, Innovative of the Year 2023 Award by the Defence Industry, winner of the Australian Army Quantum Technology Challenge for three years (2021, 2022 and 2023), the Rising Stars in Computational Materials Science by Elsevier in 2020, and the Dean’s Award for Excellence in Research (Early Career) at the University of Melbourne in 2019. Usman is also a recipient of research fellowships from Fulbright USA (2005-2010) and DAAD Germany in 2010, as well as of Purdue's Graduate School Tuition Award.

== Selected publications ==
- Muhammad Usman, Juanita Bocquel, Joe Salfi, Benoit Voisin, Archana Tankasala, Rajib Rahman, Michelle Y. Simmons, Sven Rogge, Lloyd C.L. Hollenberg, Nature Nanotechnology 11, 763 (2016); DOI: https://doi.org/10.1038/nnano.2016.83
- Muhammad Usman, Yi Z. Wong, Charles D. Hill, Lloyd C.L. Hollenberg, NPJ Computational Materials 6, 19 (2020); DOI: https://doi.org/10.1038/s41524-020-0282-0
- Maxwell T. West, Shu-Lok Tsang, Jia S. Low, Charles D. Hill, Christopher Leckie, Lloyd C.L. Hollenberg, Sarah M. Erfani, Muhammad Usman, Nature Machine Intelligence 5, 581 (2023); DOI: https://doi.org/10.1038/s42256-023-00661-1
- Azar C. Nakhl, Ben Harper, Maxwell West, Neil Dowing, Martin Sevior, Thomas Quella, Muhammad Usman, Physical Review Letters 134 190602, (2025); DOI: https://doi.org/10.1103/PhysRevLett.134.190602
- Zeheng Wang, Tim van der Laan, Muhammad Usman, Advanced Science 12, 2411573, (2025); DOI: https://doi.org/10.1002/advs.202411573
- Fanfan Lin, Zeheng Wang, Chao Ren, Xinze Li, Juan Jose Rodrigues-Andina, Sergio Vazquez, H. Alan Mantooth, Mikael Skoglund, Timothy van der Laan, Muhammad Usman, Nature Reviews Electrical Engineering (2026); DOI: https://www.nature.com/articles/s44287-026-00295-6
