= Peter Hannaford (professor) =

Peter Hannaford AC
- Born: 15 July 1939 (age 87); Cobram, Victoria, Australia
- Education: University of Melbourne
- Known for: Laser cooling of atoms
- Awards: Walter Boas Medal (1985); Companion of the Order of Australia (2023)
- Scientific career
- Fields: Physics, quantum optics
- Workplaces: University of Melbourne; Swinburne University of Technology

Peter Hannaford AC (born 15 July 1939) is an Australian academic and university professor. He is the Director of the Centre for Atom Optics and Ultrafast Spectroscopy at Swinburne University of Technology in Melbourne, and winner of the Walter Boas Medal in 1985.

== Education and career ==
Hannaford studied at the University of Melbourne, where he earned his Bachelor of Science (BSc) in 1961, his Master of Science (MSc) in 1963, and his Doctor of Philosophy (Ph.D.) in 1968.

In 1964, Hannaford was named physics tutor at Ormond College at the University of Melbourne. In 1967, he was named research scientist at the CSIRO (Commonwealth Scientific and Industrial Research Organization), Division of Chemical Physics. From 1971–83, he was a senior research scientist and later principal research scientist (1974) at the CSIRO Division of Chemical Physics.

From 1972–73, he was a guest scientist at the University of Reading (JJ Thomson Physical Laboratory) in the UK. From 1981–82, he was a Science Research Council senior research fellow at the University of Reading. In 1983, he was a senior principal research scientist at CSIRO, Division of Chemical Physics. In 1984, he was a William Evans Visiting Fellow at the University of Otago in New Zealand. In 1985, he was a Member of the Australian Academy of Science National Committee for Spectroscopy. In 1989, he was a Royal Society Guest Research Fellow and Visiting Fellow at Christ Church College, University of Oxford, UK. From 1989–2001, he was the chief research scientist at the CSIRO Division of Materials Science and Technology in Clayton, Victoria. From 1990–2000, he was a Professorial Associate at the University of Melbourne. In 1991, he was an Australian Academy of Science-Royal Society Exchange Fellow in Oxford, England.

In 1992, he was a guest scientist at the Max Planck Institute of Quantum Optics in Garching, Germany. From 1993–2003, he was the chair of the National Committee for Spectroscopy of the Australian Academy of Science. In 1997, he was a professorial fellow at Swinburne University of Technology in Hawthorn, Victoria. In 1999, he was director of the Centre for Atom Optics and Ultrafast Spectroscopy (CAOUS) at Swinburne University. From 1999–2003, he was a guest scientist at the European Laboratory for Non-Linear Spectroscopy (LENS) at the Università degli Studi di Firenze (Italy). In 2000, he was a guest professor at the University of Innsbruck (Austria). In 2002, he was a member of Commission C15 (Atomic, Molecular and Optical Physics) for the International Union of Pure and Applied Physics. In 2003, he was named a university distinguished professor at Swinburne University of Technology.

Hannaford is the institutional director of the Australian Research Council Centre of Excellence for Quantum-Atom Optics at Swinburne University of Technology. While at CSIRO in the 1970s to the 1990s, he pioneered new techniques in high-resolution and time-resolved laser spectroscopy, which have been important for characterization of the spectroscopic properties of a wide range of atoms. He has published over 150 papers in scientific journals and books. His current projects include: BEC on a chip, magnetic lattices, quantum coherence, molecular BEC, high harmonic generation and ultrafast spectroscopy.

== Awards ==
- 1985 — Walter Boas Medal of the Australian Institute of Physics
- 1991 — Fellow of the Australian Academy of Science (FAA)
- 2023 — Companion of the Order of Australia (AC)

== Selected publications ==
- From magnetic mirrors to atom chips
  Andrei Sidorov and Peter Hannaford (Eds. J. Reichel and V. Vuletic) Wiley-VCH Chapter 1, pp. 3–31 (2011)
- Kuhnle, E. D.; Hoinka, S.; Dyke, P.; Hu, H.; Hannaford, P.; Vale, C. J. (26 April 2011). "Temperature Dependence of the Universal Contact Parameter in a Unitary Fermi Gas". Physical Review Letters. 106 (17) 170402. American Physical Society (APS). arXiv:1012.2626. Bibcode:2011PhRvL.106q0402K. doi:10.1103/physrevlett.106.170402. ISSN 0031-9007. PMID 21635019. S2CID 38899011.
- Kuhnle, E. D.; Hu, H.; Liu, X.-J.; Dyke, P.; Mark, M.; Drummond, P. D.; Hannaford, P.; Vale, C. J. (9 August 2010). "Universal Behavior of Pair Correlations in a Strongly Interacting Fermi Gas". Physical Review Letters. 105 (7) 070402. American Physical Society (APS). arXiv:1001.3200. Bibcode:2010PhRvL.105g0402K. doi:10.1103/physrevlett.105.070402. ISSN 0031-9007. PMID 20868022. S2CID 45128610.
