= Nicole Bell (scientist) =

Australian physicist and professor

Nicole F. Bell
- Born: 1975 (age 50–51)
- Education: University of Melbourne
- Scientific career
- Workplaces: University of Melbourne; California Institute of Technology; Fermilab
- Thesis: Neutrino oscillations and the early universe (2000)
- Website: https://blogs.unimelb.edu.au/nicole-bell/

Nicole F. Bell (born 1975) is an Australian physicist who is a professor at the University of Melbourne. She is a theoretical physicist who works on dark matter, neutrino physics, and other topics in particle and astroparticle theory.

Bell is president of the Australian Institute of Physics. She was awarded the 2020 Australian Academy of Science Nancy Millis Medal for her work on dark matter and particle theory.

== Education and career ==
Bell is from Australia. She earned her doctorate at the University of Melbourne with thesis research on neutrino oscillations and the early universe. After earning her doctorate, Bell moved to the United States and joined the Fermilab Center for Particle Astrophysics as a research fellow. After three years at Fermilab, Bell was awarded a Sherman Fairchild Prize Fellowship at the California Institute of Technology.

Bell returned to the University of Melbourne in 2007. In 2011, she became a Chief Investigator of the Australian Research Council Centre of Excellence for Particle Physics at the Terascale, and in 2020, the Theory Program leader of the ARC Centre of Excellence for Dark Matter Particle Physics.

In 2021 Bell was elected vice president of the Australian Institute of Physics. Bell became president of the Australian Institute of Physics in 2023.

== Awards and honours ==
- 2001 Bragg Gold Medal in Physics
- 2012 Australian Research Council Future Fellowship
- 2016 Elected Fellow of the American Physical Society "for fundamental contributions regarding the interface of astrophysics and particle physics, particularly in neutrino astrophysics and cosmology, and dark matter phenomenology."
- 2020 Elected Fellow of the Australian Institute of Physics
- 2020 Australian Academy of Science Nancy Millis Medal for Women in Science
- 2026 Elected Fellow of the Australian Academy of Science

== Personal life ==
Bell has three children.
