= Anthony William Thomas =

Australian physicist

Anthony Thomas AC FAA
- Born: 15 November 1949 (age 76); Adelaide, South Australia, Australia
- Education: Flinders University
- Awards: Walter Boas Medal (1987); Thomas Ranken Lyle Medal (1997); Humboldt Research Award (1992); Harrie Massey Medal (2000); Australian Laureate Fellowship (2009); South Australian Scientist of the Year (2014)
- Scientific career
- Fields: Theoretical physics
- Workplaces: University of British Columbia; University of Adelaide; TRIUMF

Anthony William (Tony) Thomas AC, FAA (born 15 November 1949) is an Australian physicist, Professor of Physics at the University of Adelaide since 1984 and Elder Professor of Physics since 1990.

Thomas was born in Adelaide and educated at Adelaide Boys High School where he won the Thomas Price Scholarship (for the top student in the South Australian Leaving Examinations) in 1966. He was awarded the BHP Medal in 1967 as the top student in South Australia in Mathematics, Physics and Chemistry in the (new) Matriculation Examinations. He completed a Ph.D. at Flinders University in 1973.

From 1973 to 1975 Thomas was Killam Postdoctoral Fellow at the University of British Columbia, then from 1975 to 1976 was Scientific Associate of the European Organization for Nuclear Research (CERN) in Geneva. With Harold Fearing he was a founding member of the theory group at TRIUMF (Canada's National Laboratory for Particle and Nuclear Physics) in Vancouver, where he carried out research from 1976 to 1982. He chaired the Experiment Evaluation Committee there from 1982 to 1987. From 1982 Thomas was a staff member in the Theory Division at CERN, leaving only to take up a chair in Adelaide.

In 1983 Thomas accepted an offer of the Chair of Physics at the University of Adelaide; he started there in February 1984. In 1990 he was appointed Elder Professor of Physics at the University of Adelaide, and was elected a Fellow of the Australian Academy of Science. From 1991 to 1993 he was President of the Australian Institute of Physics. From 2004 to 2009 he served as Chief Scientist and associate director for Theoretical and Computational Physics at Thomas Jefferson National Accelerator Facility. In 2014, he was named as the South Australian Scientist of the Year for his work on the structure of subatomic matter.

Thomas was made a Companion of the Order of Australia in the 2020 Australia Day Honours for "eminent service to scientific education and research, particularly in the field of nuclear and particle physics, through academic leadership roles."

== Awards and honors ==
- 2009: Awarded an Australian Laureate Fellowship.
- 1987: Elected Fellow of the American Physical Society "for elucidating fundamental aspects of pion-nucleus interactions. developing the Cloudy Bag Model, and discovering the importance of nuclear binding effects in understanding the EMC effect"
