= Warwick Bowen =

Australian physicist

Warwick Bowen is an Australian quantum physicist and nanotechnologist at The University of Queensland. He leads the Quantum Optics Laboratory, is Director of the UQ Precision Sensing Initiative and is one of three Theme Leaders of the Australian Centre for Engineered Quantum Systems.

== Education ==
Bowen attended the University of Otago in New Zealand, where he received a Bachelor of Science degree with Honours in Physics in 1999. He went on to earn a PhD in Physics at the Australian National University in 2004, and was awarded the 2004 Bragg Gold Medal for Excellence in Physics from the Australian Institute of Physics, which recognizes the best PhD thesis in physics by a student from an Australian university.

Bowen went on to become Moore Postdoctoral Fellow at the California Institute of Technology in 2004 and 2005.

== Career ==
In 2005, Bowen was recruited to a faculty position in the Department of Physics at the University of Otago. Then, in 2008, he commenced a faculty position at the School of Mathematics and Physics at the University of Queensland, where he became a full Professor in 2016.

He was awarded a five-year Australian Research Council (ARC) Queen Elizabeth II Fellowship in 2009, and went on to become an ARC Future Fellow in 2015.

Since 2013, while based at the University of Queensland, Bowen has been a Principal Investigator in the US Air Force Office of Scientific Research (AFOSR) in Biophysics Program.

In 2017 Bowen established and became Director of the University of Queensland Precision Sensing Initiative. In 2018, Bowen was also awarded an Adjunct Professorship at the Australian Institute for Bioengineering and Nanotechnology at the University of Queensland.

== Research ==
Bowen's research focusses on the interface of nanotechnology and quantum science, including nanophotonics, nanomechanics, quantum optomechanics and photonic/quantum sensing. His work spans from addressing very fundamental questions about how quantum physics transitions into our everyday world at large scales, to the development of novel applications in navigation, biomedical diagnostics, quantum communications and computation. He has worked with industry partners including Boeing, NASA Glenn Laboratories and Lockheed Martin.

In particular, Bowen has focussed on quantum-enhanced sensing and communication technologies, including development of the first prototype quantum light source at gravitational wave frequencies, planned to be installed in the Laser Interferometry Gravitational Wave Observatory (LIGO) in 2018. Recently, his research group has pioneered the application of quantum optomechanical techniques in magnetometry, ultrasound sensing and microscopy of biological systems. This includes the first demonstrations that quantum correlations could improve the sensitivity and resolution of light microscopes, experiments that also were the first to apply quantum corrections to improve biological measurements; and the first demonstration of absolute quantum advantage in sensing that employs quantum correlations, showing that quantum correlations can provide image clarity beyond the usual photodamage limits of microscopy. These were longstanding challenges widely recognised in the field of quantum optics. with the latter being a key milestone in the UK Quantum Technologies Roadmap.

Prof Bowen is also developing nanophotonic techniques to control superfluid helium, an exotic quantum liquid and building block for future quantum technologies. Using these techniques, his research lab demonstrated direct laser cooling of a liquid and the tracking of quantum vortices in two-dimensional superfluid helium, both for the first time, and showed that very low threshold lasing of superfluid sound waves was possible.

== Translation ==
In 2020 Warwick Bowen founded the company Elemental Instruments with co-founder Dr Glen Harris. Elemental Instruments develops scientific instrumentation for quantum technologies, chemical and material analysis, medical imaging, and university/school laboratories and demonstrations. A key focus of the company is compact low-power solutions to generate strong, uniform and tuneable magnetic fields.

== Awards and recognition ==
Warwick Bowen has received a range of awards and honours, including

- 2020 John Love Award, Australian and New Zealand Optical Society, in recognition of innovation and technical advances in the field of optics.
- Barry Inglis Medal, Australia's National Measurement Institute [2020].Quantum Physicist and Defence Scientist take out top awards on World Metrology Day
- University of Queensland Partners in Excellence Research Award [2019] - Designing Technology for Tomorrow. Finest researchers awarded
- University of Queensland Foundation Research Excellence Award, UQs highest research award [2010]
- JILA Visiting Fellowship in 2014
- ARC Queen Elizabeth II Fellowship 2009
- ARC Future Fellowship 2015
- Winner of the Australian Museum's inaugural Eureka Prize for Inspiring Science [2003]
- 2004 Bragg Medal from the Australian Institute of Physics
