= Barry Inglis Medal =

Australian award for measurement science

- Description: Sustained contributions to Australian metrology
- Sponsored by: National Measurement Institute
- Country: Australia
- Presented by: Chief Metrologist of Australia
- First award: 2008
- Currently held by: Julio Soria (2026)
- Website: www.industry.gov.au/national-measurement-institute/about-us/annual-measurement-awards

The Barry Inglis Medal is an annual award of Australia's National Measurement Institute (NMI) that recognises a sustained record of achievement in measurement science. Described as the Australian measurement community's highest honour, it is named after Barry Inglis, the NMI's first chief executive and Chief Metrologist. The medal was first awarded in 2008.

== History ==
Barry Inglis AO PSM FTSE (died 4 July 2025) was director of the CSIRO National Measurement Laboratory from 1994 to 2004. When the laboratory became part of the newly formed National Measurement Institute in 2004, he became the institute's inaugural chief executive and Chief Metrologist. He was vice-president of the International Committee for Weights and Measures (CIPM) from 2002 to 2011 and its president from 2011 to 2019, the first Australian to hold that office. He was appointed an Officer of the Order of Australia in 2021 for distinguished service to science and engineering, particularly metrology.

The medal was originally announced each year on World Metrology Day (20 May), together with the NMI Prize for early-career researchers. Since 2022 the NMI's measurement awards have been presented at an online ceremony during National Science Week, with the medal given in the category of sustained contributions to Australian metrology. No medal was awarded in 2012 or 2013.

== Selection ==
Nominations, including self-nominations, are open to individuals or groups with one or more significant measurement-related achievements in any scientific or technical field. The work must have been carried out in Australia, or the primary nominee must be an Australian citizen; NMI employees and their immediate families are not eligible. A panel assesses nominations against three equally weighted criteria: the degree and significance of the impact, the benefit to Australia, and scientific or technical novelty. The medal is awarded only if a nomination of sufficient quality is received.

== Recipients ==
Barry Inglis Medal recipients
Year	Recipient	Affiliation	Ref.
2008	John E. Sader	University of Melbourne	
2009	Michael E. Tobar	University of Western Australia	
2010	Kenneth Baldwin	Australian National University	
2011	Philip N. H. Nakashima	Monash University	
2012	Not awarded	—	
2013	Not awarded	—	
2014	Bruce Forgan	Bureau of Meteorology	
2015	Graham Jones	St Vincent's Hospital, Sydney	
2016	Infrared Soil Analysis Group and Ziltek Pty Ltd, led by Mike McLaughlin	CSIRO; Ziltek	
2017	Andre Luiten	University of Adelaide	
2018	Derek Abbott	University of Adelaide	
2019	Wojciech Chrzanowski	University of Sydney	
2020	Warwick Bowen	University of Queensland	
2021	Joseph Berry	University of Melbourne	
2022	Oliver Jones	RMIT University	
2023	Mark Patrick Taylor	Environment Protection Authority Victoria	
2024	Vincent Wallace	University of Western Australia	
2024	Withawat Withayachumnankul	University of Adelaide	
2025	Dane McCamey	University of New South Wales	
2026	Julio Soria	Monash University	

== See also ==
- List of physics awards
- World Metrology Day
