= Harold M. Manasevit =

American materials scientist

- Born: November 1, 1927; Bridgeport, Connecticut, U.S.
- Died: March 25, 2008 (aged 80)

Dr. Harold M. Manasevit (1927–2008) was an American materials scientist.

Manasevit received a B.S. Degree in chemistry from Ohio University in 1950, M.S. in Chemistry from Pennsylvania State University in 1951, and Ph.D. in physical inorganic chemistry from the Illinois Institute of Technology in 1959. He then joined the U.S. Borax Research Corp. in Anaheim, California, but in 1960 left for North American Aviation. In 1983 he joined TRW as a Senior Scientist.

Manasevit's career focused on chemical vapor deposition (CVD) of materials. In 1963 he was the first to document epitaxial growth of silicon on sapphire, and in 1968 was the first to publish on metalorganic chemical vapor deposition (MOCVD) for the epitaxial growth of GaAs and many other III-V, II-VI and IV-VI semiconductors, including the first report of the growth of single-crystal GaN and AlN on (0001) sapphire, the process used worldwide today for the commercial production of all visible LEDs. He developed numerous CVD techniques for etching insulators and for producing semiconductor and superconducting films on insulators.

Manesevit holds 16 patents, and was awarded the 1985 IEEE Morris N. Liebmann Memorial Award "for pioneering work in metalorganic chemical vapor deposition, epitaxial-crystal reactor design, and demonstration of superior quality semiconductor devices grown by this process."

Stated by Russell D. Dupuis, "In the mid-1970s, Rockwell International Electronics Operations (Anaheim CA) was developing the guidance systems for Minuteman missiles. It was necessary to design a system with radiation-hardened circuits so the missiles could go through these nuclear bomb clouds. One key feature of these circuits was the need for stability in the conductivity of the substrate. Silicon was the technology of choice, but it suffered when exposed to large amounts of radiation. My colleague, Harold Manasevit had the idea of growing silicon on a sapphire substrate, which was an insulator from radiation and infinitely stable. So he developed a technology called silicon on sapphire, or SOS, which was used in the Minuteman Missiles. He also developed an analogous process for the growth of gallium arsenide on sapphire."
