= Jodie Bradby =

Australian physicist

- Education: Royal Melbourne Institute of Technology (B. Appl. Sc.); Australian National University (Ph.D.)
- Scientific career
- Workplaces: Case Western University; Australian National University
- Thesis: Nanoindentation-Induced Deformation of Semiconductors (2002)
- Doctoral advisor: Jim Williams

Jodie Bradby is an Australian physicist and professor at the Research School of Physics at the Australian National University (ANU). Her research primarily focuses on high-pressure physics.

== Education ==
Bradby undertook her undergraduate studies, a bachelor's degree in applied science (physics) at the Royal Melbourne Institute of Technology, after which she completed her PhD at ANU in 2002. Her thesis was titled ‘Nanoindentation-induced deformation of semiconductors’.

As a student, she was awarded a gold medal in the 2002 Materials Research Societies' Graduate Student competition and, also in 2002, the Thermo-Scientific Cowley-Moodie Award.

== Career ==
After Bradby completed her studies, she undertook a fellowship, which was awarded by the Sir Keith Murdoch American-Australian Education Fellowship, which funded a project at the Case Western Reserve University in Ohio.

Upon returning to Australia, she completed a Australian Research Council (ARC) postdoctoral fellowship, a Queen Elizabeth II fellowship and a future fellowship, as well as several ARC grants.

In 2019/2020 she was elected as the President of the Australian Institute of Physics.

As of 2025, Bradby was the director of the Research School of Physics at the Australian National University, and is the first woman to hold that role.

== Research ==
Bradby's central research interest is how materials respond to pressure, with a specific interest in the nano-mechanical responses of materials, such as semiconductors, glasses and bio-materials of different kinds. She has investigated high pressure phases in carbon group elements, including lonsdaleite, glassy carbon, carbon fibre as well as various phases of silicon and germanium.

Bradby has also studied bio-materials such as shells and the cell walls of plants.

Bradby specialises in the technique of nanoindentation, in addition to characterisation methods such as synchrotron x-ray diffraction using diamond anvil cells, and Raman spectroscopy. She has focused on material phases formed under extreme conditions of pressure including shock wave synthesis using ultrafast laser pulses.

As of 2026, Bradby has published more than 100 papers and holds three patents.

== Awards ==
In 2015, Bradby was selected as the Women in Physics Lecturer by the Australian Institute of Physics and toured Australia.

In 2024, Bradby won the Women in Leadership Medal from the Australian Institute of Physics.
