= Céline Bœhm =

Physicist

Céline Bœhm FAA FInstP
- Born: 1974 (age 51–52)
- Education: École normale supérieure Pierre and Marie Curie University; École Polytechnique
- Scientific career
- Fields: Dark matter
- Workplaces: University of Sydney; Durham University; University of Oxford; Perimeter Institute; Paris Observatory
- Website: www.ippp.dur.ac.uk/profile/cboehm

Céline Bœhm FAA FInstP is a professor of particle physics at the University of Sydney. She works on astroparticle physics and dark matter.

== Early life and education ==
Bœhm studied fundamental physics at the Pierre and Marie Curie University, graduating in 1997. She joined École Polytechnique, where she obtained a Master in Engineering in 1998. She earned the highest distinction for a postgraduate diploma in theoretical physics. She completed her PhD at the École normale supérieure in Paris in 2001, working with Pierre Fayet. She worked on supersymmetry, in the 4-body decay of the stop particle. She studied light scalar top quark and supersymmetric dark matter and looked at collisional damping, which considers the impact of dark matter and standard model particles with the cosmic microwave background.

== Career and research ==
In 2001 Bœhm joined Joseph Silk at the University of Oxford. Here she worked on light dark matter particles which couple to light Z′ bosons. She proposed new candidates for scalar dark matter, in the form of heavy fermions or light gauge bosons. When the SPI spectrometer onboard INTEGRAL identified a 511 keV line in the Galactic Center, Bœhm suggested that this could have been the signature of dark matter. She has continued to search for new signatures of dark matter, including examining the GeV excess in the Fermi Gamma-ray Space Telescope data. In 2004 Bœhm joined the Laboratoire d'Annecy-le-Vieux de Physique Théorique, where she was promoted to senior lecturer in 2008. She was awarded the Centre national de la recherche scientifique Bronze Medal.

She looked at the analysis of the CoGeNT direct detection method, and found that it could have suffered from a large background. In 2015 Boehm was nominated as Fellow of the Institute of Physics. She is the Principal investigator of the Theia mission, a space observatory which will allow Bœhm and her team to test the dark matter predictions that arise due to the Lambda-CDM model.

Boehm was made an Emmy Noether Fellow at the Perimeter Institute for Theoretical Physics in 2016, where she continued to work on dark matter. That year, she was promoted to Professor in the Institute for Particle Physics Phenomenology at Durham University. She gave a TED talk, The Invisible is All What Matters, at Durham in 2017. Alongside her work in astroparticle physics, she works on non-crystallographic Coxeter groups. She led the dark matter working package of the Euclid Consortium. In 2017 Bœhm spent two months as a visiting professor at Columbia University, as well as working at the Paris Observatory. She proposed using circular polarisation to study dark matter and neutrinos. She joined the University of Sydney as Head of School for physics in 2018. Bœhm has written for The Conversation. She has taken part in Pint of Science.

Bœhm was elected a Fellow of the Australian Academy of Science in 2026.
