= Australian Academy of Science National Committees =

The Australian Academy of Science National Committees represent the established, emerging and interdisciplinary scientific fields in Australia.

There are 22 National Committees which provide a forum to discuss issues relevant to their disciplines, help set future research directions and support Australian science internationally.

== List of the National Committees ==
- Agriculture, Fisheries and Food
- Brain and Mind
- Data in Science - Current Chair: Professor Jane Hunter
- Geographical Sciences
- Mathematical Sciences
- Physics
- Antarctic Research
- Cellular and Developmental Biology
- Earth Sciences
- History and Philosophy of Science
- Mechanical and Engineering Sciences
- Space and Radio Science
- Astronomy
- Chemistry
- Earth System Science
- Information and Communication Sciences
- Medicine and Public Health
- Biomedical Sciences
- Crystallography
- Ecology, Evolution and Conservation
- Materials Science and Engineering
- Nutrition

== Membership ==
Each committee is made up of several members and a chair. The committee membership are all scientists active in the field and usually include at least one Fellow of the Australian Academy of Science. The term of office of members is three years.

== Decadal plans ==
The ‘decadal plans’ developed by the National Committees seek input from across government, industry, academia and the education sector to identify the future needs of each discipline and outline priorities for investment over the next 10 years.

The plans make recommendations about setting research priorities and directions, infrastructure, workforce capability, educational reform, engagement with industry and the international community as well as enhanced outreach.

The Astronomy decadal plan, New Horizons, recommended that Australia bid to host the world’s largest radio telescope – the Square Kilometre Array (SKA). The SKA will now be hosted by South Africa, Australia and New Zealand and is scheduled to begin observing the sky in 2020.

Most recently, the Federal government announced funding for a further three decadal plans for Chemistry, Agricultural Science and Earth systems. In his announcement, Education minister Christopher Pyne said it was “vitally important for Governments of all persuasions to have a strategic plan that maps the investment in science and research into the future… [these] will provide important advice to Government in this vein.”

== National policy influence ==
Through submissions to government reviews, enquiries and white papers, the National Committees work with the Academy to promote their disciplines by highlighting issues in their areas. These include infrastructure, workforce needs, career structure and education. 5 The National Committees also work with professional scientific societies to hold research conferences and symposia to discuss the latest advances and highlight scientific issues of national importance.

== International linkages ==
The Academy, through its National Committees, maintains links between scientists in Australia and international science organisations, creating the opportunity to influence science decisions and participate in projects.

For example, several National Committees will play a strong role in the Future Earth initiative, an international, 10-year research project that aims to better understand and respond to the risks and opportunities of climate change, and supporting future global sustainability.

== Support for early- and mid- career researchers ==
The National Committees support early- and mid-career researchers, through awards for young researchers, as well as supporting their attendance at international scientific forums. They also offer internships to early- and mid- career researchers on the Committees to solicit input into their activities and to provide the researchers with an opportunity to network with senior scientists.

The Academy also works with the National Committees to select early career researchers to participate in the Lindau Nobel Laureates Meeting and the Japan Society for the Promotion of Science HOPE meeting.

These meetings allow young researchers to meet Nobel Laureates in their fields and other esteemed researchers.
