= Tim C. Ralph =

Australian physicist

Timothy C. Ralph
- Born: Australia
- Citizenship: Australia
- Known for: Quantum computing, Quantum cryptography
- Scientific career
- Fields: quantum optics, quantum information science
- Institutions: University of Queensland, Australian National University, University of Auckland

Tim C. Ralph is an Australian physicist who specializes in the application of quantum optics to quantum information science and quantum computing. He is Professor in Physics at the University of Queensland, and Program Manager in the ARC Centre for Quantum Computer and Communication Technology. Ralph is known for developing continuous variable quantum cryptography and co-founder of measurement based computation with continuous variable optics. In 2012, Ralph was one of the scientists responsible for establishing quantum discord as a computational resource. As of 2012, Tim has 200 publications and over 4500 citations. He has co-authored "A guide to experiments in quantum optics". His publications include 23 in Physical Review Letters, 6 in the Nature suite of journals, as well as articles in Science and Reviews of Modern Physics.

== Honours and awards ==
- 2006 ARC Professorial Fellowship
- 2000 ARC QEII Fellowship

== Books ==
- A guide to experiments in quantum optics. Vol. 1. Weinheim: wiley-vch, 2004.
