= Yuri Kivshar =

Australian nonlinear and optical physicist

Yuri S. Kivshar
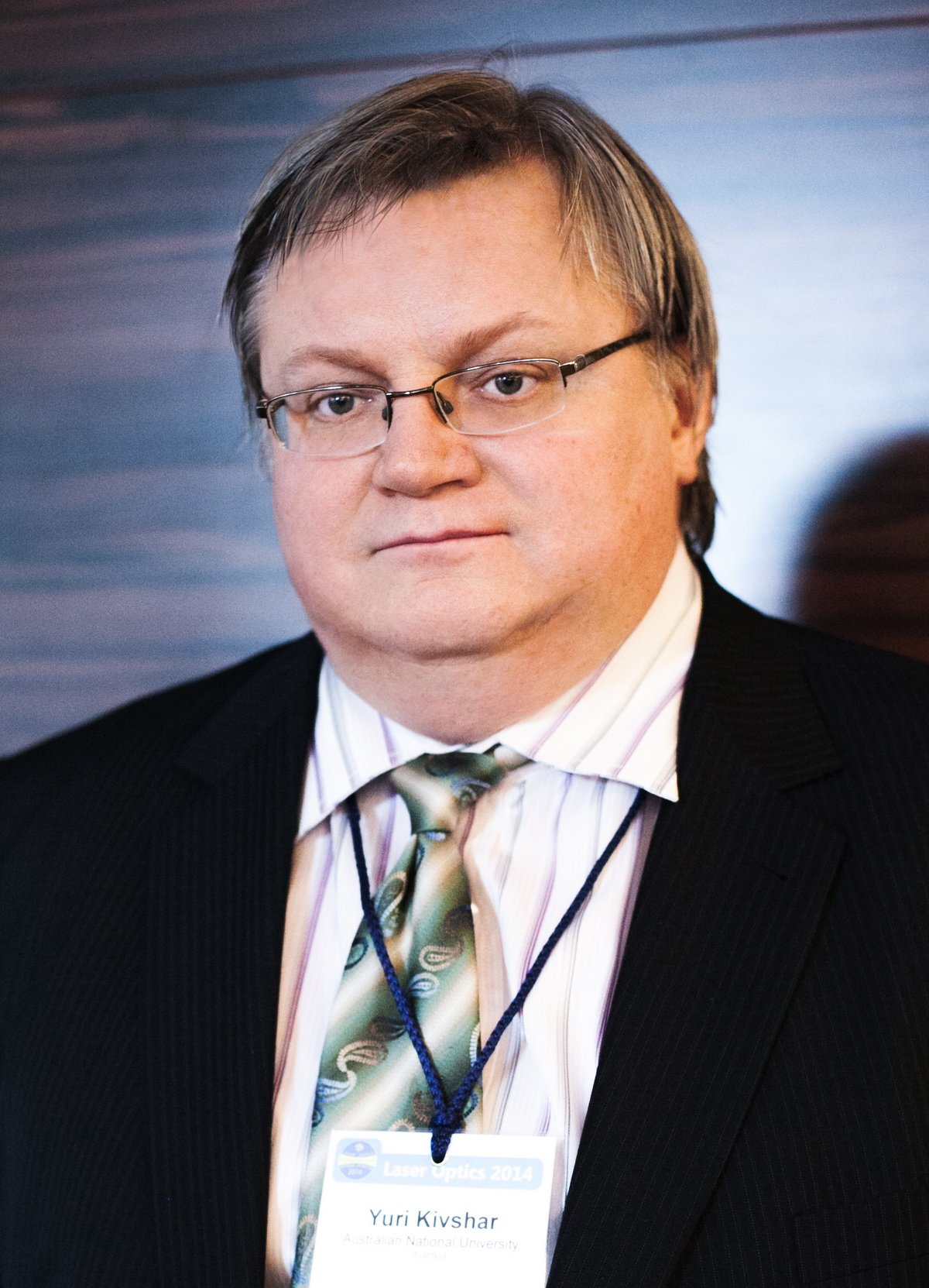
- Kivshar in June 2014
- Born: 3 April 1959 (age 67); Kharkiv, Ukrainian SSR
- Citizenship: Australia
- Education: University of Kharkiv
- Known for: Metamaterials; Topological insulators
- Awards: Max Born Award (2022) Matthew Flinders Medal and Lecture (2025)
- Scientific career
- Fields: Physics
- Workplaces: Australian National University

Yuri S. Kivshar (born 3 April 1959) is a Ukrainian-born Australian physicist. He is a Distinguished Professor in the Research School of Physics at the Australian National University (ANU) in Canberra. His research is in nonlinear optics, metamaterials and subwavelength photonics, ranging from solitons to resonant metasurfaces and topological photonics. The Australian Academy of Science credits him with introducing the field of metaphotonics and names him as one of the founders of all-dielectric resonant metaphotonics. He is a Fellow of the Academy and a recipient of the 2022 Max Born Award of Optica and the Academy's 2025 Matthew Flinders Medal.

== Education ==
Kivshar was born in Kharkiv, then part of the Soviet Union (now Ukraine). He received a master's degree in physics from the University of Kharkiv in 1981 and completed his Candidate of Sciences degree (equivalent to a PhD) at the Verkin Institute for Low Temperature Physics and Engineering in 1984.

== Career ==
After early research on soliton dynamics in condensed matter and optics, Kivshar was an Alexander von Humboldt Research Fellow at the University of Düsseldorf from 1991 to 1993. He joined the Australian National University in 1993, where he is a Distinguished Professor in the Research School of Physics. In 2002 he founded the Nonlinear Physics Centre at ANU, which he heads, and from 2002 to 2017 he was Deputy Director of the ARC Centre for Ultrahigh-bandwidth Devices for Optical Systems (CUDOS).Since 2012 he was appointed Distinguished Professor in the ITMO University (Saint Petersburg) . In 2025 he was appointed Hung Hing Ying Distinguished Visiting Professor in the Department of Physics at the University of Hong Kong. He is a deputy editor of Photonics Research and managing editor of the journal Nanophotonics, and has served on the editorial boards of several optics and photonics journals.

== Awards and honours ==
Kivshar is a Fellow of the Australian Academy of Science (elected 2002), Optica (2000), the American Physical Society (2006), the Institute of Physics and SPIE. He held Australian Federation Fellowships from the Australian Research Council in 2002 and 2007.

- Matthew Flinders Medal, Australian Academy of Science (2025)
- ZEISS Research Award (2025), shared with Jelena Vučković
- Max Born Award, Optica (2022)
- Mozi Award, SPIE (2020)
- Alexander von Humboldt Research Award (2017)
- Harrie Massey Medal and Prize, Institute of Physics (2015)
- Ukraine State Prize in Science and Technology (2013), for a body of work on nonlinear waves and solitons in condensed matter physics
- Thomas Ranken Lyle Medal, Australian Academy of Science (2007)
- Walter Boas Medal, Australian Institute of Physics (2005)

== Books ==
- Braun, O.M.; Kivshar, Yu.S. (2013) [2004]. The Frenkel-Kontorova Model: Concepts, Methods, and Applications. Springer Berlin Heidelberg. ISBN 978-3-662-10331-9.
- Kivshar, Yu.S.; Agrawal, G.P. (2003). Optical Solitons: From Fibers to Photonic Crystals. Elsevier Science. ISBN 978-0-08-053809-9.
