= Elisabetta Barberio =

Australian physicist

Elisabetta Luigia Barberio
- Occupation: Physicist
- Employer: University of Melbourne
- Title: Professor

Elisabetta Barberio is an Italian-Australian physicist and professor at the University of Melbourne where she is also a member of the Experimental Particle Physics Group. As of 2026 she is the director of the Australian Research Council's centre of Excellence for Dark Matter Particle Physics.

== Career ==
Before starting work at the University of Melbourne Barberio had spent much of her career at the Large Electron–Positron Collider at CERN in Switzerland. There she was involved in data analysis in the OPAL experiment.

In Australia Barberio initiated a direct detection program for dark mater which lead to the creation of the Stawell Underground Physics Laboratory where she leads the SABRE South experiment. In 2025, for her work at Stawell, and her distinguished service to science which was awarded the Italian Bilateral Scientific Cooperation Award.

== Awards ==
- 2025 - Italian Bilateral Scientific Cooperation Award, Italian Ministry of Foreign Affairs and International Cooperation.
- 2018 - Walter Boas Medal of the Australian Physical Institute (first time a woman was awarded the medal).
