= Robert Street =

Robert Street AO FAA (16 December 1920 – 4 July 2013) was a British academic and academic administrator.

Born in Wakefield, Yorkshire and educated at Hanley High School, he was offered a scholarship to New College, Oxford in 1939, but upon failing to meet the university's Latin requirement he instead took up a place at King's College London where he studied physics. He later completed his PhD at University College, Nottingham. He worked as a senior lecturer at the University of Sheffield from 1954 to 1960 and as Foundation Professor of Physics at Monash University from 1960 to 1974. He later served as vice-chancellor of the University of Western Australia from 1978 to 1986. He also served as president of the Australian Institute of Physics.

Street was appointed an Officer of the Order of Australia in 1985 "For Service to Learning", was elected a Fellow of the Australian Academy of Science in 1973 and was awarded the Centenary Medal in 2001 "For service to Australian society and science in physics".
