= Australian Institute of Physics =

The Australian Institute of Physics was established in 1963, when it replaced the Australian Branch of the British Institute of Physics based in London. The purpose of the institute is to promote the role of physics in research, education, industry and the community. The AIP publishes Australian Physics (ISSN 1036-3831) since 1963. Every two years, the Institute organises a national congress, the latest being held in December 2024 in Melbourne.

== Organisation ==
The institute has branches in each of the six Australian states, and topical groups in the following areas:

- Atomic Physics and Molecular Physics
- Condensed Matter Physics and Materials Physics
- Nuclear Physics and Particle Physics
- Physics Education
- Quantum Information, Concepts and Quantum Coherence
- Solar Physics, Terrestrial Physics and Space Physics
- Theoretical Physics
- Women in Physics

== Presidents ==
- 1962–65 Leonard Huxley
- 1966–67 F. Lehany
- 1968 Alan Walsh
- 1969–70 A. Harper
- 1971–72 Robert Street
- 1973–74 F. J. Jacka
- 1975–76 J. Campbell
- 1977–78 Terry Sabine
- 1979–80 Herbert Bolton
- 1981–82 Neville Fletcher
- 1983–84 G. V. H. Wilson
- 1985–86 T. Fred Smith
- 1987–88 John Collins
- 1989–90 Anthony Klein
- 1991–92 Anthony Thomas
- 1993–94 Robert Crompton
- 1995–96 Ron McDonald
- 1997–98 Jaan Oitmaa
- 1999–2000 John Pilbrow
- 2001–02 John O'Connor
- 2003–04 Rob Elliman
- 2005–06 David Jamieson
- 2007–08 Cathy Foley
- 2009–10 Brian James
- 2011–12 Marc Duldig
- 2013–14 Robert Robinson
- 2015–16 Warrick Couch
- 2017–18 Andrew Peele
- 2019–20 Jodie Bradby
- 2021–22 Sven Rogge
- 2022–23 Nicole Bell

== Awards ==
=== Bragg Gold Medal ===
The Bragg Gold Medal for Excellence in Physics has been awarded since 1992 for the best PhD thesis by a student from an Australian University and to commemorate Sir Lawrence Bragg (in front on the medal) and his father Sir William Henry Bragg who both played a significant part in physics education in Australia. Winners so far are:

- 1992 Stephen Bass, University of Adelaide
- 1993 Henry Chapman, University of Melbourne
- 1994 Wolodymyr Melnitchouk, University of Adelaide
- 1995 Howard Wiseman, University of Queensland
- 1996 Andre Luiten, University of Western Australia
- 1997 Alexander Buryak, Australian National University
- 1998 Tanya Monro, University of Sydney
- 1999 Ping Koy Lam, Australian National University
- 2000 Mark Oxley, University of Melbourne
- 2001 Nicole Bell, University of Melbourne
- 2002 Annette Berriman, Australian National University
- 2003 Michael Bromley, Charles Darwin University
- 2004 Warwick Bowen, Australian National University
- 2005 Philip Bartlett, Murdoch University
- 2006 Alex Argyros, University of Sydney
- 2008 Frank Ruess, University of New South Wales
- 2009 Christian Romer Rosberg, Australian National University
- 2010 Clancy William James, University of Adelaide
- 2011 Adrian D'Alfonso, University of Melbourne
- 2012 Eva Kuhnle, Swinburne University of Technology
- 2013 Martin Fuechsle, University of New South Wales
- 2014 Andrew Sutton, Australian National University
- 2015 Jarryd Pla, University of New South Wales
- 2016 Phiala Shanahan, University of Adelaide
- 2017 Daniel Leykam, Australian National University
- 2018 Yevgeny Stadnik, University of New South Wales
- 2019 Samuel Gorman, University of New South Wales
- 2020 Alexander Bray, Australian National University
- 2021 Timothy Gray, Australian National University
- 2022 Sebastian Wolf, University of Melbourne
- 2023 Kirill Koshelev, Australian National University
- 2024 Matthew Berrington, Australian National University

=== Dirac Medal ===
The Dirac Medal for the Advancement of Theoretical Physics is awarded by the University of New South Wales in Sydney, jointly with the Australian Institute of Physics on the occasion of the public Dirac Lecture. The Lecture and the Medal commemorate the visit to the university in 1975 of Professor Dirac, who gave five lectures there. These lectures were subsequently published as a book: Directions of Physics (Wiley, 1978 – H. Hora and J. Shepanski, eds.). Professor Dirac donated the royalties from this book to the University for the establishment of the Dirac Lecture series. The prize, first awarded in 1979, includes a silver medal and honorarium. The recipients of the prize are:

- 1979: Hannes Alfvén
- 1981: John Clive Ward
- 1983: Nicolaas Bloembergen
- 1985: David Pines
- 1987: Robert Hofstadter
- 1988: Klaus von Klitzing
- 1989: Carlo Rubbia & Kenneth G. Wilson
- 1990: Norman F. Ramsey
- 1991: Herbert A. Hauptman
- 1992: Wolfgang Paul
- 1996: Edwin Salpeter
- 2002: Heinrich Hora
- 2003: Edward Shuryak
- 2004: Iosif Khriplovich
- 2006: Sir Roger Penrose
- 2008: Harald Fritzsch
- 2011: Lord May of Oxford
- 2012: Brian Schmidt
- 2013: Sir Michael Pepper
- 2014: Serge Haroche
- 2015: Subir Sachdev
- 2016: Kenneth Freeman
- 2017: Boris Altshuler
- 2019: Lene Hau
- 2020: Susan Scott
- 2023: Klaus Mølmer
- 2026: Sriram Ramaswamy

== Women in leadership medal ==
- 2022: Céline Bœhm
- 2024: Jodie Bradby
- 2026: Kirrily Rule
- 2026: Maria Parappilly

== Honorary Fellows ==
- David Booth
- Gordon Chapman
- Robert Crompton
- John Robert de Laeter
- Robert Delbourgo
- Geoff Forrest
- Michael Gorroick
- Tony Klein
- GC Lowenthal AM
- Bruce McKellar
- Arthur Page
- Brian Schmidt
- John Symonds
- Anthony William Thomas AC
- Gertrud Thompson

== Fellows ==
- Derek Abbott
- Ronald Ernest Aitchison
- Hans A. Bachor
- Clive Baldock
- Murray Batchelor
- Nicole Bell
- David Blair
- Sean Cadogan
- Susan Coppersmith
- Warrick Couch
- Mahananda Dasgupta
- Robert Delbourgo
- John Robert de Laeter
- Peter Drummond
- F. J. Duarte
- Ben Eggleton
- Min Gu
- Peter Hannaford
- Arthur Robert Hogg
- Heinrich Hora
- Leonard Huxley
- Rodney Jory
- Yuri Kivshar
- Bruce Harold John McKellar
- Tanya Monro
- Brian J. Orr
- James A. Piper
- Arthur W. Pryor
- Anthony William Thomas
- John Clive Ward
- Alan Walsh
- John White
- Muhammad Usman
