= Sean Cadogan =

Australian physicist

John M. (Sean) Cadogan is professor of physics at the University of New South Wales and a former Canada Research Chair in advanced materials.

Using advanced nuclear techniques, he studies the magnetic compounds formed between rare earth elements and transition elements. Cadogan also uses nuclear techniques to explore "soft-magnetic" materials based on iron and other elements, which are found in such applications as the transformer cores used by the electrical power industry.

== Personal ==
Cadogan became a Tier 1 Canada Research Chair at the University of Manitoba in July 2007. He began his formal training in his homeland of Australia, earning his PhD in 1983 from the University of New South Wales. In 1984 he left for Dublin, Ireland, where he was a Postdoctoral Research Fellow in the Department of Pure and Applied Physics at Trinity College, Dublin. He then returned to Australia in 1987 and began his teaching and research career in earnest.

Cadogan has authored over 200 peer-reviewed journal articles, has been awarded peer-reviewed research funding of over $5 million, and was elected to Fellowship of the Australian Institute of Physics in 2001. He is a regular referee of research papers submitted for publication to ten international scientific journals and he has served as an Associate Editor for a special 2-volume edition of the Journal of Magnetism and Magnetic Materials.
