= Australian Journal of Physics =

- Discipline: Physics
- Language: English

Publication details
- History: 1948–2001
- Publisher: CSIRO Publishing (Australia)
- Frequency: Bimonthly
- Open access: Yes

Standard abbreviations
- ISO 4: Aust. J. Phys.

Indexing
- CODEN: AUJPAS
- ISSN: 0004-9506 (print); 1446-5582 (web)
- LCCN: 56041287
- OCLC no.: 1518825

Links
- Journal homepage; Online access (vols. 6–53)

The Australian Journal of Physics was a peer-reviewed scientific journal published by the Commonwealth Scientific and Industrial Research Organisation in Australia. It was a journal for the publication of reviews covering all branches of physics. The journal surveyed the development of selected topics within the wider context of physics.

The journal published its last issue in April 2001 and is no longer receiving papers. The journal's electronic archive, covering the years 1953–2001, is available for free full text access.

One of the most highly cited papers published in the journal is

- Bracewell, Ronald N. (1956). "Strip Integration in Radio Astronomy". Australian Journal of Physics. 9: 198–217. Bibcode:1956AuJPh...9..198B. doi:10.1071/PH560198.

in which he first presented the projection-slice theorem widely used in medical imaging.

== See also ==
- List of physics journals
