= International Journal of High Speed Electronics and Systems =

- Discipline: Engineering
- Language: English
- Edited by: Michael Shur

Publication details
- Publisher: World Scientific (Singapore)

Standard abbreviations
- ISO 4: Int. J. High Speed Electron. Syst.

Indexing
- ISSN: 0129-1564 (print); 1793-6438 (web)

Links
- Journal homepage

The International Journal of High Speed Electronics and Systems was established in 1990 and is published quarterly by World Scientific. It aims to "promote engineering education by advancing interdisciplinary science between electronics and systems and to explore high speed technology in photonics and electronics".

== Abstracting and indexing ==
The journal is abstracted and indexed in Inspec, Scopus and Compendex.
