= Ping Koy Lam =

Australian physicist

- Born: Penang, Malaysia.
- Education: Australian National University, University of Auckland
- Known for: quantum optics, quantum cryptography, quantum teleportation.
- Awards: AIP Alan Walsh Medal (2014), UNSW Eureka Prize (2006), British Council Eureka Prize (2003), AIP Bragg Medal (1999).
- Scientific career
- Fields: Quantum Optics, Quantum Information Technology
- Workplaces: A*STAR, Australian National University, Laboratoire Kastler-Brossel, University of Erlangen-Nuremberg

Ping Koy Lam FAA is an Australian scientist, an Australian Research Council Australian Laureate Fellow, and former Professor of Physics at the Australian National University in Canberra, where he was a work package director and program manager in the ARC Centre for Quantum Computer and Communication Technology. Lam joined A*STAR as Chief Quantum Scientist in August 2022 while retaining his position as a tenured Professor at the Australian National University.

As of October 2025 he is no longer a member of Faculty at Australian National University.

For his PhD thesis in 1999 he was awarded the Australian Institute of Physics Bragg Medal. He was awarded the 2003 British Council Eureka Prize for inspiring science (quantum teleportation) and the 2006 UNSW Eureka Prize for innovative research (quantum cryptography).

He researches quantum optics, optical metrology, nonlinear optics and quantum information. His highly cited research includes pioneering work in quantum memory, and optical quantum information processing.

In May 2020 he was elected fellow of the Australian Academy of Science.
