= Min Gu =

Australian physicist

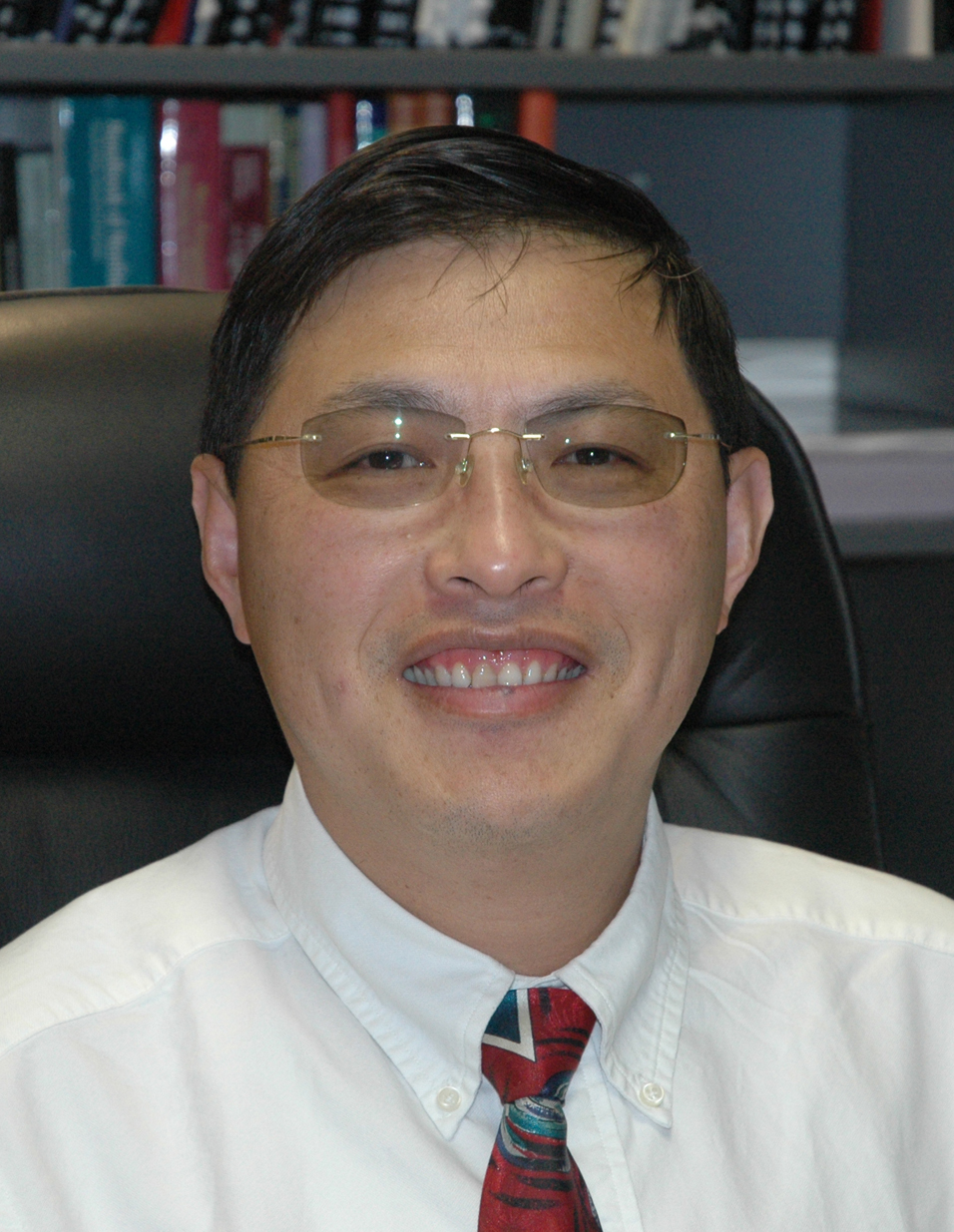
Min Gu

Min Gu (Chinese: 顾敏; born 1960) is a Chinese-Australian physicist who currently serves as the Executive Chancellor and Professor at the University of Shanghai for Science and Technology. Previously he was Distinguished Professor and Associate Deputy Vice-Chancellor for Research Innovation & Entrepreneurship at RMIT University.

Gu is an elected fellow of the Australian Academy of Science (FAA) (2007), the Australian Academy of Technological Sciences and Engineering (FTSE) (2006), the Australian Institute of Physics (FAIP) (1998), the Optical Society of America (FOSA) (2004), the International Society for Optical Engineering (FSPIE) (2003), the Institute of Physics (FInstP) (2008), the International Institute of Electrical and Electronics Engineers (FIEEE) (2015), and the Chinese Academy of Engineering (foreign member, 2017).

== Early life and education ==
Gu was born in 1960 in the outskirts of Shanghai, China, to parents who were both primary school teachers. He entered school in 1966, the year that the Cultural Revolution began. His education was severely disrupted in the chaotic period, and he "graduated" from high school after only nine and half years, with just two and half years of uninterrupted schooling. He was working as a farmer in rural Shanghai when the National College Entrance Examination was resumed in late 1977, a year after the end of the Cultural Revolution. He took the exam and was admitted to the Department of Applied Physics of Shanghai Jiao Tong University.

After earning his B.S. in 1982, he pursued graduate studies at the Shanghai Institute of Optics and Fine Mechanics of the Chinese Academy of Sciences, obtaining an M.S. in 1984 and a Ph.D. in 1988. He moved to Australia in 1988, initially as a visiting scholar.

== Career ==
Gu was a Laureate Fellow of the Australian Research Council and a University Distinguished Professor in optoelectronics and Foundation Director of the Centre of Micro-Photonics (2000-2015) at Swinburne University of Technology. He was appointed as Pro Vice-Chancellor for International Research Collaboration (2009-2010), Research Innovation (2010), and Research Capacity (2011-2015) at Swinburne. He was also the Foundation Director of the Victoria-Suntech Advanced Solar Facility from 2010-2015. From 2003-2015 he was a Node Director of the Australian Research Council Centre of Excellence for Ultrahigh-bandwidth Devices for Optical Systems. From 2005 - 2010, he was a node leader of the Australian Cooperative Research Centre for Polymers. Previously, he was the Special Advisor to Swinburne’s Vice-Chancellor, Acting Deputy Vice-Chancellor (Research and Development) and Vice President, Dean of Science, Acting Dean and Deputy Dean (Research) of Engineering and a member of the University Council, Academic Board, and Board of Research.

Gu is an authority in the fields of nanophotonics, nanofabrication, biophotonics and multi-dimensional optical data storage with internationally renowned expertise in three-dimensional optical imaging theory. He is the sole author of two standard reference books, Principles of Three-Dimensional Imaging in Confocal Microscopes (World Scientific, 1996), and Advanced Optical Imaging Theory (Springer-Verlag, 2000). He is also the first author of Femtosecond Biophotonics: Core Techniques and Applications,(Cambridge University Press, 2010). and Microscopic Imaging through Tissue-like Media: Monte Carlo Modelling and Applications (Springer-Verlag, 2015). He has over 490 papers in internationally refereed journals including Nature, Science, Nature Photonics, Nature Communications and PNAS. He is a member of the Editorial Boards of 16 top international journals. Professor Gu's research has led to significant impacts on societal challenges in solar energy, information technology and big data storage.

He served as President (2002–2004) and Vice President (2004–2012) of the International Society of Optics within Life Sciences. He was Vice President of the International Commission for Optics (ICO) (2005–2011). He was the Chair of the ICO Prize Committee and member of the ICO Galileo Galilei Award Committee and served on the Young Scientist Prize Committee in Optics of the International Union of Pure and Applied Physics. He served on the board of directors of the Optical Society of America (Executive committee, the finance committee, Chair of the International Council, Chair of the Working Group on Asia).

He was awarded the Chang Jiang Chair Professorship (Ministry of Education, China, 2007), the World Class University Professorship (Ministry of Education, South Korea, 2009), Einstein Professorship (Chinese Academy of Sciences, 2010), and Australian Laureate Fellowship (Australian Research Council, 2010). He is a recipient of the W. H. Steel Prize (Australian Optical Society, 2011), the Ian Wark Medal and Lecture (Australian Academy of Science, 2014), the Boas Medal (Australian Institute of Physics, 2015), and the Victoria Prize for Science and Innovation in Physical Sciences (2016). In 2019, he received the Dennis Gabor Award from the International Society for Optics and Photonics (SPIE). Gu is also the recipient of the Emmett N. Leith Medal from Optica.

He was a Finalist of the Australian Innovation Competition (2013), and a winner of the People's Choice KCA Research Commercialisation Award (2015).
