= ANU Research School of Physics =

Research school at the Australian National University

Coordinates: 35.28343°S 149.11333°E

Research School of Physics
- Other name: RSPhys
- Parent institution: Australian National University
- Established: 1947
- Focus: Physics
- Location: Canberra, Australian Capital Territory, Australia
- Website: physics.anu.edu.au

The Research School of Physics (RSPhys) was established with the creation of the Australian National University (ANU) in 1947. Located at the ANU's main campus in Canberra, the school is one of the four founding research schools in the ANU's Institute of Advanced Studies.

Initially part of the Institute of Advanced Studies it was primarily a research school with limited interaction with the ANU's undergraduate students. This changed when it merged with the ANU Department of Physics in 2008 which was responsible for physics undergraduate education. With a total of around 250 employees the school has approximately 120 PhD students and 140 academic staff. The school is divided into separate research departments, PhD students can often have supervisors spanned several departments.

== Research ==
RSPhys is one of the leading physics research institutions in Australia. Major research facilities at the school include the 14UD NEC Pelletron accelerator and associated modular superconducting linac run by the Department of Nuclear Physics and Accelerator Applications plus an extensive range of smaller experimental and computational equipment.

Research ranges from the fundamental to the applied, including both experimental and theoretical work. The school's primary research areas are: materials science and engineering; lasers, nonlinear optics and photonics; nanotechnology and mesoscopic physics; physics of atoms, molecules and the nucleus; plasma physics and surface science; physics and the environment.

The nuclear physics 14UD is one of a handful of large Van de Graaff accelerators in the world. It was the largest machine of its type when installed in 1974. After many upgrades the 14UD is capable of running terminal voltage of up 16.7 MV. Charging is via three inductive charging chains. In 1996 a superconducting RF linac was installed that is used as an energy booster for the 14UD enabling higher energies to be reached.

== History ==
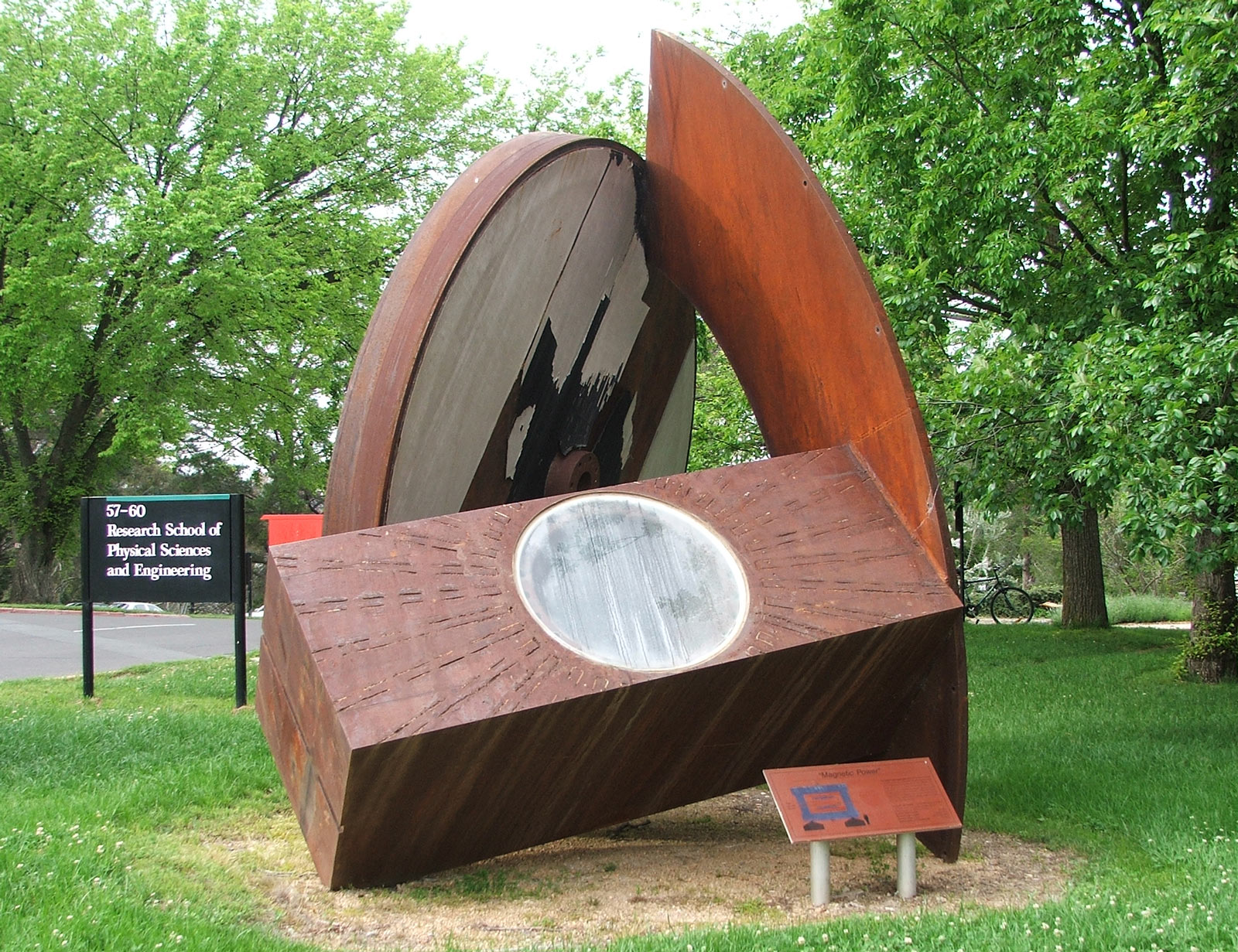
The remains of the RSPhysSE 500MJ homopolar generator

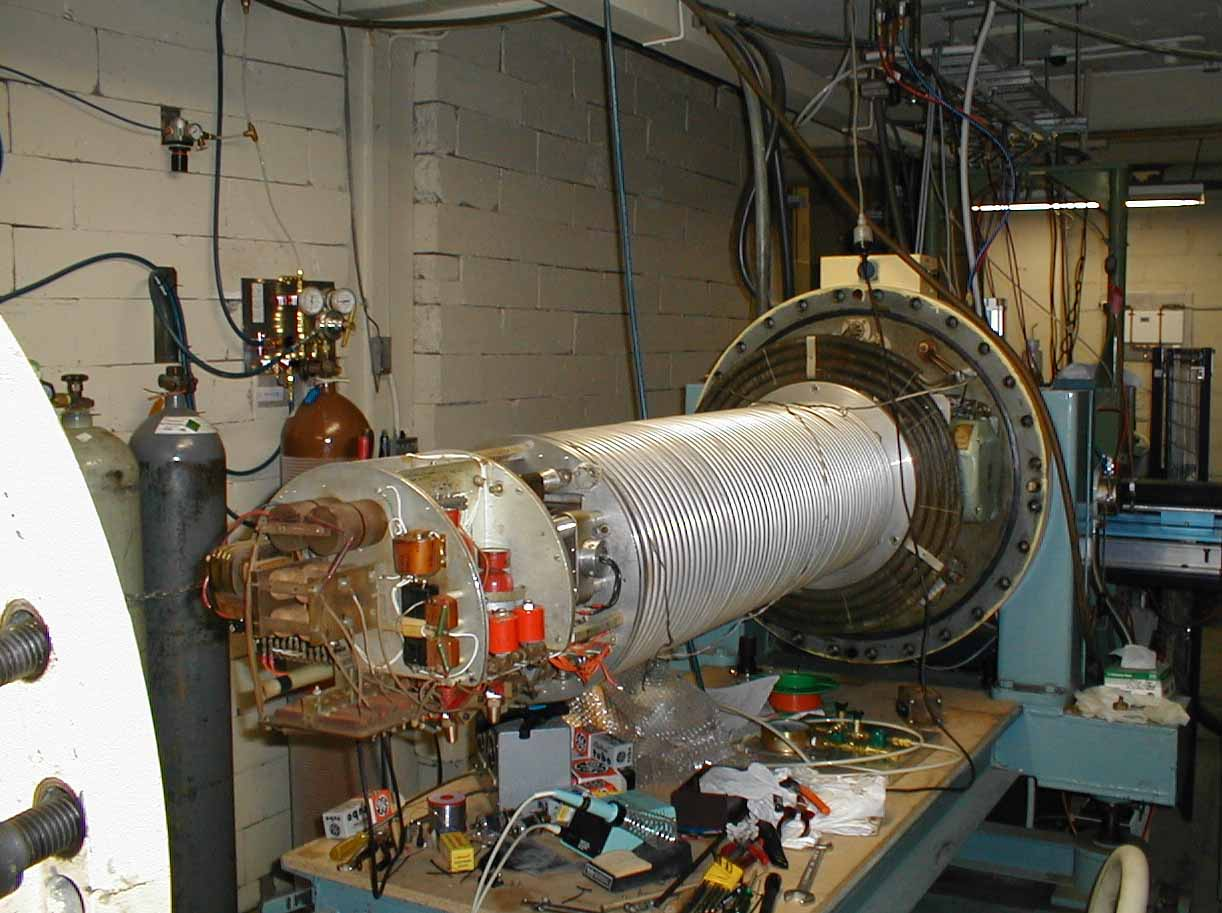
2 MeV "High Voltage" Van de Graaff linear accelerator built in 1960

Sir Mark Oliphant was the founder of the school and its first director from 1950 to 1963. The school was originally called the "Research School of Physical Sciences" with "Engineering" being added to its title in 1990 to highlight the large amount of engineering work that is undertaken in the school. The name was again changed in 2008 to the "Research School of Physics and Engineering" to coincide with the merger with ANU's undergraduate physics teaching department. In support of a university strategic focus on the discipline of Engineering at ANU, the School name was changed to "Research School of Physics" in August 2019. Nonetheless, the Research School of Physics retains a strength in graduate research in the fields of electronic materials, optics and instrumentation engineering. The long history of engineering physics remains an attraction for students and staff who work between the disciplines of physics and engineering.

For much of the early years the focus of a large part of the school was designing, re-designing and building a cyclo-synchrotron that in its final intended form was to produce a beam of 10.6 GeV protons for nuclear physics research. Designed to be a world class research machine it was referred to within the school as "The Big Machine". Due to shifting goalposts and huge costs the cyclo-synchrotron was never completed. The small 7.7 MeV cyclotron designed to function as the proton injector was completed in 1955, and the large homopolar generator intended to power the system was first operated in 1962, but by this time work on "The Big Machine" itself had been abandoned.

The homopolar generator, the largest ever built, was capable of supplying currents of over 2 megaamperes. Even though it was never used for its intended purpose it ended up being used for numerous research projects requiring an extremely high current source until its disassembly in 1986. One of these projects was the invention and development of the railgun by John Barber and Richard Marshall. The school also benefited in an indirect way from the construction of the massive generator, the accumulated engineering experience and techniques where later used to build other research equipment around the school including the Plasma Physics H1NF Heliac. Some parts of the homopolar generator are now on permanent display on the lawn outside the research school.

The school has been home to many different particle accelerators over the years. The first accelerator installed was a 1.25 MV Cockcroft-Walton known as HT1, this was in use from 1952 until 1967 when it was sold to the University of New South Wales. A second smaller 600 kV Cockcroft-Walton machine (HT2) was assembled in house using many spare parts acquired for HT1. In 1955 the UK government supplied a 33 MeV electron synchrotron as a gift. It was moved to the University of Western Australia in 1961. During 1960–1980 a HVEC EN tandem accelerator was used by nuclear physics for light ion research. 1975 saw the school's 14UD accelerator come online, which has since been augmented with a superconducting linear accelerator.

On 5 July 1960 a fire during the night destroyed much of the eastern end of the Cockcroft Building. The damage included the drawing office, many student's and staff's results and files and the control room for the 600 kV Cockcroft-Walton accelerator. The 600 kV accelerator though only water damaged had to be scrapped. Refurbishment of the burnt out area was completed in September 1961.

Early departments that have now been spun off into research schools of their own include the departments of Astronomy and Geophysics and Geochemistry. Geophysics and Geochemistry separated into the Research School of Earth Sciences in 1973. Mount Stromlo Observatory became part of the Department of Astronomy in 1957. While part of the school, the Department of Astronomy developed Siding Spring Observatory and installed many new telescopes at Mount Stromlo Observatory. It separated into the Research School of Astronomy and Astrophysics in 1986.

== Structure ==
=== Departments ===
- Electronic Materials Engineering
- Fundamental and Theoretical Physics
- Materials Physics
- Nuclear Physics and Accelerator Applications
- Quantum Science and Technology

=== Centres and Networks ===
- ANU Centre for Gravitational Astrophysics (CGA)
- ARC Centre of Excellence for Dark Matter Particle Physics
- ARC Centre of Excellence for Engineered Quantum Systems (EQUS)
- ARC Centre of Excellence for Quantum Computation and Communication Technology (CQC2T)
- ARC Centre of Excellence in Future Low-Energy Electronics Technologies (FLEET)
- ARC Centre of Excellence for Gravitational Wave Discovery (OzGrav)
- ARC Centre of Excellence for Transformative Meta-Optical Systems (TMOS)
- Australian Nanotechnology Network (ARCNN)

=== National Facilities ===
- Australian National Fabrication Facility (ANFF)
- National Laboratory for X-ray Micro Computed Tomography (CTLab)
- HIAF - Heavy-Ion Accelerators Facility
- Ion Implantation Lab (iiLab)
- The ARC Training Centre for Multiscale 3D Imaging, Modelling and Manufacturing

=== Deans and Directors ===
- Sir Mark Oliphant 1950–1963
- John Jaeger 1964–1965
- Sir Ernest Titterton 1966–1973
- Robert Street 1974–1978
- John Carver 1978–1992
- Erich Weigold 1992–2002
- Jim Williams 2002–2012
- Stephen Buckman 2012–2015
- Timothy Senden 2015 – 2025
- Jodie Bradby 2025 -
