= Jane Hunter (scientist) =

Australian data scientist

Professor Jane Hunter
- Citizenship: Australian
- Education: PhD (Computer Science) (Cambridge), B. Eng (Metallurgical) (UQ) (1A Hons), B.Sc (Materials) (UQ)

Jane Hunter was the interim Director of the Australian Urban Research Infrastructure Network (AURIN). She has held roles such as the Director of University of Queensland's e-Research Lab and Chair of the Australian Academy of Science's National Committee for Data in Science; Vice-President of the National Executive Committee for Digital Humanities; and Member of Scientific Committee of the ICSU World Data System. E-research has emerged through the exponential expansion of information technologies. New online tools, networks, data capture, management and visualisation techniques are needed to enhance collaboration and data sharing between researchers who need access to very large data collections, high-performance analysis and modelling particularly across disciplines.

Her research projects cover a wide range of topics and include the OzTrack Project looking at how to store, analyse and visualise animal tracking data; The Twentieth Century in Paint a multidisciplinary project to inform the preservation of modern art; HuNI - Humanities Networked Infrastructure applying new data tools to integrate Australia's most significant cultural datasets for humanities researchers. In speaking of a joint project on Queensland's waterways, Hunter notes, 'There is a massive amount of monitoring data being collected, and Health-e-Waterways provides a high-tech approach to turning that data into meaningful information".
