= Australian Laureate Fellowship =

Professorial research fellowship

The Australian Laureate Fellowship is an Australian professorial research fellowship awarded by the Australian Research Council. Fellows are chosen each year for five-year awards. In 2023 eight industry-focused Laureate Fellowships were awarded for the first time.

== Kathleen Fitzpatrick and Georgina Sweet fellowships ==
In 2010, the Australian Research Council created the Kathleen Fitzpatrick and Georgina Sweet Australian Laureate Fellowships. The Kathleen Fitzpatrick fellowship is named for Kathleen Fitzpatrick and honours a woman candidate in a humanities field. The Georgina Sweet fellowship is named for Georgina Sweet and honours a woman in a science or technology discipline. In addition to the funding from the standard Australian laureate fellowship, both of these named fellowships include an additional $20,000 per year to promote women in research.

== Recipients ==
=== 2025 ===
Name	Area of Research	Institution	Notes	Refs
Alex Collie	Reforming Australia's work disability benefit systems	Monash University		
Wenhui Duan	Re-imagining concrete as a carbon sink	Monash University		
Robert Edwards	New horizons for synthetic phages	Flinders University		
Xiaojing Hao	Multidimensional Targeted Synthesis of Compound Semiconductor PV Materials	University of New South Wales		
Julie Henry	Transforming understanding of cognitive ageing: Bridging the lab-life gap	University of Queensland		
Matt King	Tracking and predicting the future of the East Antarctic Ice Sheet	University of Tasmania		
Sean Li	Transforming 2D Transistors: Breakthroughs in Nano-Dielectric Engineering	University of New South Wales		
Josephine McDonald	Pilbara Dreaming: Rock Art, Water and Heritage Futures	University of Western Australia		
Felicity Meakins	Amplifying Indigenous Ecological Knowledge in Western Science with Language	University of Queensland	Kathleen Fitzpatrick Australian Laureate Fellowship	
Tiffany Morrison	Transforming environmental governance for novel ocean-based climate action	University of Melbourne		
Richard Payne	Unlocking the Modified Proteome	University of Sydney		
Anya Reading	The expedited discovery of subsurface Antarctica	University of Tasmania	Georgina Sweet Australian Laureate Fellowship	
Daichao Sheng	Next-generation geotechnologies for high-speed and heavy-haul rail	University of Technology Sydney		
Hrvoje Tkalčić	Echoes from the Planetary Cores: Seismic Insights into Deep Worlds	Australian National University		
James Ward	Transforming cities for Indigenous Peoples' social and emotional wellbeing	University of Queensland		
Geoffrey Webb	Temporal analytics for a complex, dynamic and ever-changing world	Monash University		
Chuan Zhao	A next-generation water splitter for a green-hydrogen future	University of New South Wales		

=== 2024 ===
Name	Area of Research	Institution	Notes	Refs
Derek Abbott	Ultrasensitive terahertz sensing	University of Adelaide		
Andrew Baker	Stalagmites and groundwater	University of New South Wales		
Gabrielle Belz	Immune response in vertebrates	University of Queensland		
Nathaniel Bindoff	Earth's response to emission reductions	University of Tasmania		
Alan Collins	Mapping Earth's surface	University of Adelaide		
Yihong Du	Partial differential equations	University of New England		
Christopher Gibson	Decarbonisation transitions	University of Wollongong		
Michael Kearney	Pests and climate change	University of Melbourne		
Liza Lim	Musical approach to climate change	University of Sydney		
James McCaw	Mathematical modelling for infectious diseases	University of Melbourne		
Andrea Morello	Quantum computing	University of New South Wales		
Jacqueline Peel	International law for corporate climate accountability	University of Melbourne	Kathleen Fitzpatrick Australian Laureate Fellowship	
Sharon Robinson	Future of Antarctic ecosystems	University of Wollongong		
Jeffrey Walker	Surveillance capability for natural disasters	Monash University		
Hongxia Wang	Molecular engineering for solar cell development	Queensland University of Technology	Georgina Sweet Australian Laureate Fellowship	
Michael Ward	Understanding the wild domestic animal interface	University of Sydney		
Thomas Wernberg	Great Southern Reef	University of Western Australia		

=== 2023 ===
Name	Area of Research	Institution	Notes	Refs
Xuemei Bai	Zero carbon cities	Australian National University		
Jacqueline Batley	Disease resistance in plants	University of Western Australia		
Janeen Baxter	Gender equality	University of Queensland	Kathleen Fitzpatrick Australian Laureate Fellowship	
Phillip Cassey	Wildlife crime	The University of Adelaide	Industry Laureate	
Joshua Cinner	Coral reef fisheries	James Cook University		
Heike Ebendorff-Heidepriem	Glass fibers	The University of Adelaide	Industry Laureate	
Terry Flew	Digital technologies and societal trust	University of Sydney		
Timothy Fletcher	Stormwater management	The University of Melbourne	Industry Laureate	
Gary Froyland	Dynamical systems and data	University of New South Wales		
Alexander Hamilton	Quantum computing	The University of New South Wales	Industry Laureate	
Matthew Hornsey	Carbon transition	University of Queensland		
Jane McAdam	Emergency evacuations and law	University of New South Wales		
Nam-Trung Nguyen	Microfluidics, wearable medical devices	Griffith University		
Sarah Pink	Digital economy and net zero transition	Monash University		
Shizhang Qiao	Battery storage	The University of Adelaide	Industry Laureate	
Veena Sahajwalla	E-waste recycling	The University of New South Wales	Industry Laureate	
Jennifer Smith-Merry	The National Disability Insurance Scheme	The University of Sydney	Industry Laureate	
Catherine Stampfl	Renewable energy	University of Sydney	Georgina Sweet Australian Laureate Fellowship	
Willy Susilo	Cryptography	University of Wollongong		
Gerhard Swiegers	Green hydrogen	The University of Sydney	Industry Laureate	
Gene Tyson	Predictive understanding of the human microbiome	Queensland University of Technology		
Shaobin Wang	Nonmetals for green catalysis	University of Adelaide		
Geordie Williamson	Fundamental symmetries of discrete structures	University of Sydney		
Yusuke Yamauchi	Conductive porous catalysts	University of Queensland		
Alpha Yap	Tissue mechanics and cell sociology	University of Queensland		

=== 2022 ===
Name	Area of Research	Institution	Notes	Refs
Timothy Bedding	Asteroseismology	University of Sydney		
Larissa Behrendt	First Nations	University of Technology Sydney	Kathleen Fitzpatrick Australian Laureate Fellowship	
David Bowman	Bushfires	University of Tasmania		
Cyrille Boyer	Light-Driven manufacturing	University of New South Wales		
Anne Castles	Literacy in adolescence	Macquarie University		
Simon Driver	Dark matter	University of Western Australia		
Joanne Etheridge	Electron microscopy	Monash University	Georgina Sweet Australian Laureate Fellowship	
Alexander Fornito	Human brain	Monash University		
Andrew Hassell	mathematics of wave motion	Australian National University		
Mark Krumholz	supercomputing	Australian National University		
Lidia Morawska	air quality in buildings	Queensland University of Technology		
Michael Stumpf	mathematical biology	University of Melbourne		
Karen Thorpe	early childhood learning	University of Queensland		
Matt Trau	nano-manufacturing	University of Queensland		
Peter Veth	Traditional Custodians' heritage protection	University of Western Australia		
Nicolas Voelcker	wearable sensors	Monash University		

=== 2021 ===
Name	Area of Research	Institution	Notes	Refs
Matthew Barnett	Metal recycling	Deakin University		
Axel Bruns	Partisanship, polarisation and democracy	Queensland University of Technology		
Helen Byrne	Mathematical biology	University of Sydney		
Kishan Dholakia	3D volumetric imaging	University of Adelaide		
Jeffery Errington	Biology of L-form bacteria	University of Sydney		
Sharon Friel	Global health equity	Australian National University		
Kliti Grice	Biofilm entombment and microbial functionality	Curtin University		
Zaiping Guo	High energy-density batteries	University of Wollongong		
Dayong Jin	upconversion nanotechnology	University of Technology Sydney		
Yun Liu	Crystal chemistry	Australian National University	Georgina Sweet Australian Laureate Fellowship	
Dena Lyras	Microbiology	Monash University		
Alexander McBratney	Soil monitoring system	University of Sydney		
Naomi McClure-Griffiths	How galaxies work	Australian National University		
Michael Milford	Global positioning systems	Queensland University of Technology		
Sundhya Pahuja	Global corporations, accountability and international law	University of Melbourne	Kathleen Fitzpatrick Australian Laureate Fellowship	
Robert Parton	Cell biology	University of Queensland		
Andrew White	Artificial intelligence and neuromorphic computers	University of Queensland		

=== 2020 ===
Name	Area of Research	Institution	Notes	Refs
Alison Bashford	World Population	University of New South Wales		
Ross Buckley	IT law	University of New South Wales		
Dennis Del Favero	Art and Technology	University of New South Wales		
Maureen Dollard	Occupational Safety and Health	University of South Australia	Kathleen Fitzpatrick Australian Laureate Fellow	
Elaine Holmes	Senescence	Murdoch University		
David James	Genetics of aging	University of Sydney		
Loeske Kruuk	Wildlife management and conservation	Australian National University		
Catherine Lovelock	Conservation of coastal wetland	University of Queensland	Georgina Sweet Australian Laureate Fellow	
Harvey Millar	Plant Protein	University of Western Australia		
Jochen Mueller	Management of Chemical Substances	University of Queensland		
Martina Stenzel	Nanomedicine	University of New South Wales		
Kari Vilonen	Mathematics	University of Melbourne		
Toby Walsh	Artificial intelligence	University of New South Wales		
Huanting Wang	Renewable energy	Monash University		

=== 2019 ===
Name	Area of Research	Institution	Notes	Refs
Andrew Dzurak	Quantum Computing	University of New South Wales		
Barry Pogson	Plant Biology	Australian National University		
Belinda Medlyn	Environmental Science	Western Sydney University	Georgina Sweet Australian Laureate Fellow	
David Bellwood	Coral Reefs	James Cook University		
Debra Bernhardt	Molecular Simulations	University of Queensland		
Enrico Valdinoci	Partial Differential Equations	University of Western Australia		
Jie Lu	Machine Learning	University of Technology Sydney		
John Grundy	Software Engineering	Monash University		
Kaarin Anstey	Dementia	University of New South Wales		
Lianzhou Wang	Solar Energy	University of Queensland		
Liming Dai	Catalysis	University of New South Wales		
Lynette Russell	Indigenous Australians	Monash University	Kathleen Fitzpatrick Australian Laureate Fellow	
Marcela Bilek	Surface Modification	University of Sydney		
Nina Wedell	Ecology	University of Melbourne		
Rupert Quentin Grafton	Water Justice	Australian National University		
Sara Dolnicar	Tourism	University of Queensland		
Yi-Min (Mike) Xie	Architecture	RMIT University		

=== 2018 ===
Name	Area of Research	Institution	Notes	Refs
Bostjan Kobe	Innate Immunity	University of Queensland		
Christine Beveridge	Plant Genetics	University of Queensland	Georgina Sweet Australian Laureate Fellow	
Dan Li	Nanoionics	University of Melbourne		
Hanns-Christoph Nägerl	Quantum Simulation	University of Queensland		
Hong Hao	Civil Engineering	Curtin University		
James Whisstock	Molecular Imaging	Monash University		
Jolanda Jetten	Social Psychology	University of Queensland		
Jonathon Barnett	Adaptation to climate change in the Pacific	University of Melbourne		
Julian Gale	Crystallization	Curtin University		
Karl Glazebrook	Galaxy Formation	Swinburne University of Technology		
Kourosh Kalantar-zadeh	Liquid Metals	University of New South Wales		
Madeleine van Oppen	Coral Reefs	University of Melbourne		
Marilyn Fleer	Child Development	Monash University	Kathleen Fitzpatrick Australian Laureate Fellow	
Peter Visscher	Genomics	University of Queensland		
Stephen Foley	Plate Tectonics	Macquarie University		
Tamara Davis	Dark Energy	University of Queensland		

=== 2017 ===
Name	Area of Research	Institution	Notes	Refs
Ann McGrath	History of Indigenous Australians	Australian National University	Kathleen Fitzpatrick Australian Laureate Fellow	
Christopher Barner-Kowollik	Materials Science	Queensland University of Technology		
Colin MacLeod	Cognitive Science	University of Western Australia		
Dacheng Tao	Computer Vision	University of Sydney		
Edward C. Holmes	Virology	University of Sydney		
Fedor Sukochev	Quantum Calculus	University of New South Wales		
Geoffrey McFadden	Biology	University of Melbourne		
George Willis	Mathematics	University of Newcastle		
Gottfried Otting	Proteomics	Australian National University		
Jill Bennett	Immersive Visualization	University of New South Wales		
Mathai Varghese	Geometric analysis	University of Adelaide		
Michelle Coote	Catalysis	Australian National University	Georgina Sweet Australian Laureate Fellow	
Paul E. Griffiths	Philosophy of Medicine	University of Sydney		
Shizhang Qiao	Sustainable Energy	University of Adelaide		
Svetha Venkatesh	Pattern Recognition	Deakin University		
George Zhao	Energy Storage	University of Queensland		
Zhiguo Yuan	Bioconversion	University of Queensland		

=== 2016 ===
Name	Area of Research	Institution	Notes	Refs
Adrienne Stone	Constitutional Law	University of Melbourne	Kathleen Fitzpatrick Australian Laureate Fellow	
Alan Rowan	Extracellular Matrix	Australian Institute for Bioengineering and Nanotechnology		
Anthony Bebbington	Geography of mining and extractivism	University of Melbourne	Resigned, 2019	
Barry Brook	Land Use	University of Tasmania		
Branka Vucetic	Wireless Communication	University of Sydney	Georgina Sweet Australian Laureate Fellow	
David McAlpine	Sound Localization	Macquarie University		
Dmitri Golberg	Nanotechnology	National Institute for Materials Science		
Jamie Rossjohn	Immunology	Monash University		
Jonathan Woodhead	Climate of Australia	University of Melbourne		
Michael Tyers	Cell Biology	University of Montreal		
Paul Burn	Organic LEDs	University of Queensland		
Paul Tacon	Indigenous Australian Art	Griffith University		
Peter Cawood	Continental Crust	University of St. Andrews		
Peter Waterhouse	Plant Genetics	Queensland University of Technology		
Phillip Boyd	Oceanography	University of Tasmania		
Sharon K. Parker	Work design	University of Western Australia	Kathleen Fitzpatrick Australian Laureate Fellow	

=== 2015 ===
Name	Area of Research	Institution	Notes	Refs
Anne Orford	Law of War	University of Melbourne	Kathleen Fitzpatrick Australian Laureate Fellow	
Benjamin Andrews	Partial Differential Equations	Australian National University		
Bradley Sherman	Food Security	University of Queensland		
David Craik	Drug Design	University of Queensland		
Justin Gooding	Biosensing	University of New South Wales		
Kerrie Mengersen	Bayesian Statistics	Queensland University of Technology		
Leann Tilley	Biometrology	University of Melbourne	Georgina Sweet Australian Laureate Fellow	
Lisa Kewley	Cosmology	Australian National University		
Matthew Bailes	Radio Astronomy	Swinburne University of Technology		
Philip Hugenholtz	Microbial Ecology	University of Queensland		
Ping Koy Lam	Laser Levitation	Australian National University		
Ronald Rapee	Adolescence	Macquarie University		
Steven Sherwood	Cloud Physics	University of New South Wales		
Trevor McDougall	Ocean Mixing	University of New South Wales		
Zheng-Xiang Li	Plate Tectonics	Curtin University		

=== 2014 ===
Name	Area of Research	Institution	Notes	Refs
Alan J. Cooper	Genomics	University of Adelaide		
Antoine M. van Oijen	DNA Replication	University of Wollongong		
Ian D. Small	Gene Expression	University of Western Australia		
Ian Paulsen	Marine Bacteria	Macquarie University		
John Dryzek	Deliberative Democracy	University of Canberra		
Jonathan Bland-Hawthorn	Spectral Imaging	University of Sydney		
Joy Damousi	Refugee Children	University of Melbourne	Kathleen Fitzpatrick Australian Laureate Fellow	
Justin N. Marshall	Vision Science	University of Queensland		
Kate Smith-Miles	Algorithms	Monash University	Georgina Sweet Australian Laureate Fellow	
Matthew Spriggs	Archaeology	Australian National University		
Michael I. Bird	Climate Change in Australia	James Cook University		
Peter A. Robinson	Neuroscience	University of Sydney		
Peter Harrison	Secularization	University of Queensland		
Rose Amal	Solar Energy	University of New South Wales		
Thomas P. Davis	Nanoparticles	Monash University		
Veena Sahajwalla	Electronic Waste	University of New South Wales	Georgina Sweet Australian Laureate Fellow	

=== 2013 ===
Name	Area of Research	Institution	Notes	Refs
Arthur Lowery	Signal Processing	Monash University		
Bert Roberts	Geochronology	University of Wollongong		
Glenda Sluga	Internationalism	University of Sydney	Kathleen Fitzpatrick Australian Laureate Fellow	
Hugh O'Neill	Mineralogy	Australian National University		
Hugh Possingham	Conservation Biology	University of Queensland		
Ian Reid	Computer Vision	University of Adelaide		
Katherine Demuth	Language Development	Macquarie University		
Kim Sterelny	Evolutionary Psychology	Australian National University		
Lloyd Hollenberg	Quantum Sensing	University of Melbourne		
Mark Cassidy	Offshore Drilling	University of Western Australia		
Mark Finnane	Criminal Justice	Griffith University		
Michelle Simmons	Quantum Computing	University of New South Wales		
Nicholas Evans	Linguistic Diversity	Australian National University		
Peter Taylor	Stochastic Processes	University of Melbourne		
Tanya Monro	Photonics	University of Adelaide	Georgina Sweet Australian Laureate Fellow	
Trevor Lithgow	Visual Prosthesis	Monash University		
Xu-Jia Wang	Nonlinear Partial Differential Equations	Australian National University		

=== 2012 ===
Name	Area of Research	Institution	Notes	Refs
Alexandra Aikhenvald	Ethnolinguistics	James Cook University		
Ben Eggleton	Photonics	University of Sydney		
David Lindenmayer	Surrogate Species	Australian National University		
Douglas MacFarlane	Renewable Energy	Monash University		
Eelco Rohling	Sea Level Rise	Australian National University		
Frank Caruso	Biomolecular Engineering	University of Melbourne		
Ivan Marusic	Fluid Dynamics	University of Melbourne		
John Quiggin	Financial Regulation	University of Queensland		
Malcolm McCulloch	Marine Calcifiers	University of Western Australia		
Michael Fuhrer	Electronics	Monash University		
Nalini Joshi	Nonlinear Systems	University of Sydney	Georgina Sweet Australian Laureate Fellow	
Nicholas Wormald	Probabilistic Combinatorics	Monash University		
Ove Hoegh-Guldberg	Coral Reefs	University of Queensland		
Rick Shine	Invasive Species	University of Sydney		
Sue O'Connor	Human Dispersal to Australia	Australian National University	Kathleen Fitzpatrick Australian Laureate Fellow	
Terry Hughes	Coral Reefs	James Cook University		
Tessa Morris-Suzuki	Grassroots Politics in Asia	Australian National University		

=== 2011 ===
Name	Area of Research	Institution	Notes	Refs
Alexander Haslam	Social Psychology	University of Queensland		
Bernard Degnan	Cell Biology	University of Queensland		
Craig Moritz	Biodiversity	Australian National University		
David Studdert	Public health	University of Melbourne		
Gordon Wallace	Bionics	University of Wollongong		
Ian Peterson	Quantum Physics	University of New South Wales		
Jason Mattingley	Attention	University of Queensland		
Mahananda Dasgupta	Particle Accelerators	Australian National University	Georgina Sweet Australian Laureate Fellow	
Maria Forsyth	Sustainable Energy	Deakin University		
Martin Asplund	Milky Way Galaxy	Australian National University		
Michael Keane	Population Aging	University of New South Wales		
Peter Bartlett	Machine Learning	Queensland University of Technology		
Peter Gavin Hall	Data Science	University of Melbourne		
Philip Bland	Meteorites	Curtin University		
Pippa Norris	Democracy	University of Sydney	Kathleen Fitzpatrick Australian Laureate Fellow	
Stuart Wyithe	Galaxy Formation	University of Melbourne		
Warwick Anderson	Australian Racial Thought	University of Sydney		

=== 2010 ===
Name	Area of Research	Institution	Notes	Refs
Amnon Neeman	Derived Categories	Australian National University		
Ary Hoffmann	Pest Control	University of Melbourne		
Bryan Gaensler	Astronomy	University of Sydney		
Christian Turney	Climate Change	University of New South Wales		
Hanna Kokko	Adaptation	Australian National University		
Hilary Charlesworth	Human Rights	Australian National University		
Lorraine Mazerolle	Policing	University of Queensland		
Margaret Jolly	Anthropology	Australian National University		
Mark Bradford	Civil Engineering	University of New South Wales		
Mark Westoby	Ecology	Macquarie University		
Matthew England	Ocean Warming	University of New South Wales		
Min Gu	Nanotechnology	Swinburne University of Technology		
Paul Mulvaney	Nanotechnology	University of Melbourne		
Peter Goodyear	Education	University of Sydney		
William Laurance	Conservation	James Cook University		

=== 2009 ===
Name	Area of Research	Institution	Notes	Refs
Anthony William Thomas	Particle Physics	University of Adelaide		
Bernard Balleine	Decision-Making	University of Sydney		
Brian Schmidt	Astronomy	Australian National University		
Chennupati Jagadish	Nanotechnology	Australian National University		
Dietmar Muller	Geology	University of Sydney		
George Williams	Anti-Terrorism Legislation	University of New South Wales		
Jennifer Martin	Antibacterials	University of Queensland		
Lesley Head	Human-Environment Interaction	University of Wollongong		
Michael Tobar	Telecommunications	University of Western Australia		
Peter Hodgson	Metals	Deakin University		
Peter Mumby	Coral Reefs	University of Queensland		
Richard Bryant	Aboriginal Mental Health	University of New South Wales		
Richard Hobbs	Ecology	University of Western Australia		
Scott W. Sloan	Civil Engineering	University of Newcastle		
Stephen Simpson	Nutrition	University of Sydney		
