= Andrew G. White =

Australian physicist

- Education: Australian National University, University of Queensland
- Known for: Quantum computing
- Scientific career
- Fields: quantum optics, quantum information science
- Workplaces: University of Queensland, Los Alamos National Laboratory, University of Konstanz

Andrew G. White FAA is an Australian scientist, Professor of Physics, and holds an Australian Laureate Fellowship. In 1999 he founded the Quantum Technology Laboratory at the University of Queensland, and is currently a Node Manager for the Training Centre in Current and Emergent Quantum Technologies (QuTech).

His previous roles include: Director of the Australian Research Council Centre for Engineered Quantum Systems (EQUS)—from 2016 until the Centre concluded in mid-2025— as well as Deputy-Director (2011 to 2016); Program Manager and Chief Investigator (2008 to 2017) in the ARC Centre for Quantum Computing and Communication Technology (CQC2T); and Program Manager (2003–2007) and Chief Investigator (2000–2007) in the ARC Centre for Quantum Computing Technology (CQT).

He researches in quantum optics, quantum information science and fundamental quantum science, and conducted research on topics ranging from shrimp eyes, through nuclear physics, to optical vortices. Andrew likes quantum weirdness for its own sake, and his current research aims to explore and exploit the full range of quantum behaviours—notably entanglement—with an eye to engineering new technologies and scientific applications. Recent examples include using quantum technologies in neuromorphic computing to realise truly energy-efficient artificial intelligence, improved machine learning using quantum reservoirs, and otherwise impossible measurements using indefinite causal order.

His highly cited publications include work on how to create and detect an optical vortex, sources of quantum entanglement, quantum tomography, and demonstration of the first entangling version of a quantum logic gates.

== Honours and awards ==
- 2021 Australian Laureate Fellowship
- 2013 Fellow of the Australian Academy of Science
- 2010 Fellow of the American Physical Society
- 2010 Pawsey Medal of the Australian Academy of Science
- 2009 Fellow of the Optical Society of America
- 2006 Australian Research Council Federation Fellowship

== Publications ==
A full list can be found at Andrew's homepage.
