= Ivan Marusic =

Australian engineer and physicist

- Born: 1965 (age 60–61)
- Education: Melbourne University
- Known for: studies of turbulence at high Reynolds numbers
- Awards: Australian Laureate Fellowship (2012)
- Scientific career
- Fields: Fluid mechanics
- Workplaces: University of Melbourne; University of Minnesota
- Doctoral advisor: Anthony E. Perry

Ivan Marusic FRS (born 1965) is an Australian engineer and physicist. He is known for his work on turbulence at high Reynolds number, using both theoretical and experimental approaches.

Marusic was born to Croatian parents in Široki Brijeg in Bosnia and Herzegovina. He emigrated to Australia when he was three years old along with his parents and older sister. He grew up in Melbourne.

He received his PhD in 1992 and a bachelor's degree in mechanical engineering in 1987 from the University of Melbourne. From 1998 to 2002 he was a faculty member at the University of Minnesota, USA, where he was a recipient of an NSF Career Award, Packard Fellowship in Science and Engineering and Taylor Career Development Award. He received an ARC Federation Fellowship in 2006, ARC Laureate Fellowship in 2012 and since 2014 is an elected Fellow of the Australian Academy of Science. In 2010 Marusic was elected a Fellow of the American Physical Society. He was awarded a 2016 APS Stanley Corrsin Award for fluid dynamics research. He was elected a Fellow of the Australian Academy of Technology and Engineering in 2021 and of the Royal Society in 2024.
