= Stampfl =

Stampfl is a surname. Notable people with the surname include:

- Catherine Stampfl (fl. 1990), Australian condensed matter physicist
- Franz Stampfl (1913–1995), Austrian-born British/Australian athletics coach
