= John Quiggin =

Australian economist (born 1956)

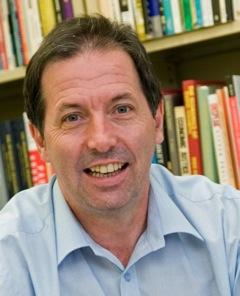
- Born: 29 March 1956 (age 70); Adelaide, South Australia

Academic background
- Education: University of New England; Australian National University

Academic work
- Discipline: Agricultural economics, Resource economics
- School or tradition: Keynesian economics
- Institutions: University of Queensland; James Cook University; Australian National University; University of Sydney; University of Maryland; Queensland University of Technology; University of Adelaide; Johns Hopkins University
- Notable ideas: Utility theory
- Awards: Australian Laureate Fellowship (2012)

John Quiggin (born 29 March 1956) is an Australian economist, a professor at the University of Queensland. He was formerly an Australian Research Council Laureate Fellow and Federation Fellow and a member of the board of the Climate Change Authority of the Australian Government.

== Education ==
Quiggin completed his undergraduate studies at the Australian National University graduating with a Bachelor of Arts in Mathematics in 1978 and a Bachelor of Economics in 1980. He then completed a Master of Economics through coursework and thesis at the Australian National University in 1984, and finished his Doctor of Philosophy in economics at the University of New England in 1988.

== Academic and professional career ==
From 1978 to 1983, Quiggin was a research economist and in 1986 was the chief research economist with the Bureau of Agricultural Economics, now called the Australian Bureau of Agricultural and Resource Economics of the Australian Government Department of Agriculture, Fisheries and Forestry. From 1984 to 1985 he was a research fellow of the Centre for Resource and Environmental Studies at the Australian National University. From 1987 to 1988 he was a lecturer and then senior lecturer in the Department of Agricultural Economics of the University of Sydney. In 1989 he was a visiting fellow at the Centre for International Economics, a consultancy firm in Canberra.

From 1989 to 1990, he was an associate professor in the Department of Agricultural and Resource Economics of the University of Maryland, College Park, a Fellow of the Research School of Social Sciences of Australian National University from 1991 to 1992, a senior fellow from 1993 to 1994 and a professor in 1995 at the Centre for Economic Policy Research of the Australian National University in 1995. From 1996 to 1999 Quiggin was a professor of economics and Australian Research Council Senior Fellow at James Cook University. Also in 1996, Quiggin was elected as a Fellow of the Academy of Social Sciences in Australia. From 2000 to 2002 he was an Australian Research Council Senior Fellow at the Australian National University and an adjunct professor at the Queensland University of Technology and the inaugural Don Dunstan Visiting Professor at the University of Adelaide.

He has been based at the University of Queensland since 2003, being an Australian Research Council professorial fellow and federation fellow and a professor in the School of Economics and the School of Political Science and International Studies. He was an adjunct professor at the Australian National University from 2003 to 2006 and was the Hinkley Visiting Professor at Johns Hopkins University in 2011.

== Other work ==
Quiggin writes a blog involving "commentary on Australian and world events from a socialist and democratic viewpoint". It was included in the Focus Economics Top Economics and Finance Blogs of 2018 and the Top 100 Economics Blogs of 2020 by the Intelligent Economist. He is also a regular contributor to Crooked Timber, Inside Story and The Guardian. Until April 2015, he was a Fellow at the Centre for Policy Development. He was an opinion columnist for the Australian Financial Review from 1996 until March 2012.

As of 2015, Quiggin opposed Bitcoin, calling it a "delusion" that would lead to "environmental disaster" due to the "ever-increasing environmental damage from the electricity used in the 'mining' of Bitcoins" and that "The sooner this collective delusion comes to an end, the better." He also proposed that the value of Bitcoin was a refutation of the efficient market hypothesis: "The EMH states that the market value of an asset is equal to the best available estimate of the value of the services or income flows it will generate. In the case of a company stock, this is the discounted value of future earnings. Since Bitcoins do not generate any actual earnings, they must appreciate in value to ensure that people are willing to hold them. But an endless appreciation, with no flow of earnings or liquidation value, is precisely the kind of bubble the EMH says can’t happen."

In 2012, through Princeton University Press, Quiggin published his book Zombie Economics: How Dead Ideas Still Walk among Us which sold upward of 20 000 copies and was translated into eight languages. His most recent book, Economics in Two Lessons: Why Markets Work So Well, and Why They Can Fail So Badly, was published in 2019 also from Princeton University Press and provides an introduction to free-market economics, covering key theory as well as its successes and failures.

He was appointed in 2012 to the board of the Climate Change Authority of the Australian Government. With reference to the pro-nuclear film Pandora's Promise, Quiggin comments that it presents the environmental rationale for nuclear power, but that reviving nuclear power debates is a distraction, and the main problem with the nuclear option is that it is not economically viable. Quiggin says that we need more efficient energy use and more renewable energy commercialisation.

As part of his "commitment to public debate", Quiggin has contributed to a wide variety of Parliamentary inquires through submissions and appearances. These include the inquiries into Uranium Mining and Nuclear Power, Land Use in Victoria, the US-Australia Free Trade Agreement and the Urban Water Inquiry to name a few.

== Awards ==
Quiggin is one of the most prolific economists in Australia, illustrated by citation frequencies in the period 1988–2000. He has been placed in the top 5% economists in the world according to IDEAS/RePEc since its monthly aggregate rankings began in 2004. Quiggin has frequently been awarded and recognised for his research, including twice receiving Federation Fellowships from the Australian Research Council.

He was awarded the Australian Social Science Academy Medal in 1993 and a Fellowship in 1996, received the 1997 and 2000 Sam Richardson Award of the Institute of Public Administration, Australia, received the 2001 Editors Prize of the Australian Journal of Agricultural Economics, a Fellowship of the Australian Institute of Company Directors in 2002, and a Distinguished Fellowship of the Australian Agricultural and Resource Economics Society in 2004. He is a Fellow of the Econometric Society and in 2011 received the Distinguished Fellow Award of the Economic Society of Australia. He was awarded an Australian Laureate Fellowship in 2012.

== Selected works ==
- 1994. Work for All: Full Employment in the Nineties, Melbourne University Press, Carlton, ISBN 0-522-84641-6 (ed., with John Langmore) TOC.
- 1996. Great Expectations: Microeconomic Reform and Australia, Allen & Unwin, Sydney, ISBN 1-86448-236-2
- 1998. Taxing Times: A Guide to the Tax Debate in Australia, UNSW Press, Sydney, ISBN 0-86840-441-1
- 1998. "Social Democracy and Market Reform in Australia and New Zealand," Oxford Review of Public Policy, 14(1), pp. 79–109, also in A. Glyn (ed.), 2001, Social Democracy in Neoliberal Times: The Left and Economic Policy since 1980, Oxford University Press, Oxford, pp. 80–109. ISBN 0-19-924138-4.
- 2000. Uncertainty, Production, Choice, and Agency: The State-Contingent Approach, Cambridge University Press, New York, ISBN 0-521-62244-1 (with Robert G Chambers) Description and preview.
- 2001. "Demography and the New Economy," Journal of Population Research, 18(2), p p. 177–193.
- 2019. Economics in Two Lessons: Why Markets Work So Well, and Why They Can Fail So Badly. Princeton University Press, ISBN 978-0-691-15494-7 Description TOC, and Introduction.
- 2012. "Prospects of a Keynesian utopia", Aeon Magazine, 27 September 2012
