= Demuth =

Demuth or DeMuth may refer to:

== Places ==
- Demuth Museum, in Lancaster, Pennsylvania

== People ==
- Adrien Demuth (born 1991), French chess grandmaster
- Charles Demuth (1883–1935), American artist
- Christopher DeMuth (born 1946), American lawyer
- Dana DeMuth (born 1956), American baseball umpire
- Ellen Demuth (born 1982), German politician
- Helene Demuth (1820–1890), Karl Marx's housekeeper
- Katherine Demuth, American linguist and academic
- Lisa Demuth (born 1967), American politician
- Norman Demuth (1898–1968), English composer and music academic
