= Maria Forsyth =

Australian chemist professor

Maria Forsyth AM FAA FTSE
- Education: Monash University
- Known for: Research on materials for energy storage
- Awards: Australian Laureate Fellowship (2011)
- Scientific career
- Fields: Chemistry
- Workplaces: Deakin University

Maria Forsyth is an Australian chemist. She is a research professor at the University of the Basque Country and an Alfred Deakin Fellow at Deakin University in Victoria, Australia where she holds the chair in Electromaterials and Corrosion Sciences.

Her research has applications in both energy storage and in understanding the mechanisms of corrosion.

== Education ==
Forsyth gained a first class degree and her doctorate at Monash University. In 1985 she was the top Australian student chemist and she was awarded the Masson medal. This led to a three-year commonwealth scholarship.

In 1990, Fulbright funded her postdoctoral Fellowship. The Australian Research Council funded her fellowship from 2003 for four years and during this time she won the Dean's Award for Excellence in Research from her university's Engineering department.

In 2012, she became the Alfred Deakin Professor at Deakin University. She then became a fellow of the Australian Academy of Science in 2015, an associate Director of ACES as well as being an Australian Laureate Fellow and the Chair of Electromaterials and Corrosion Science. Forsyth is a research Professor at the University of the Basque Country in Spain.

== Research ==
In 2018, her research group was looking at novel metal-air batteries where the electrolytes are unusual. They are able to look at electrochemical processes using Nuclear magnetic resonance techniques. She focuses on studying materials which are use for transporting electrical charge both within the electrolyte and at the interface between the electrolyte and the metal. This has applications in both energy storage and in understanding the mechanisms of corrosion.

The battery systems include combinations which include either sodium or lithium battery systems. The ion transportation has included systems using ionic liquids, polymer electrolytes and plastic crystals. Her group has created a new large rage of organic plastics that have ionic applications.

In 2020, she and colleagues announced a breakthrough in Lithium batteries due to a novel salt based electrolyte. The resulting batteries were more efficient and they were not flammable. In fact their new batteries became more efficient as the temperature increases.

== Other awards ==
- Deputy Director Institute for Frontier Materials (IFM), Deakin University
- Australian Laureate Fellowship, 2011
- Victorian Honour Roll of Women, 2020
- Fellow of the Australian Academy of Technological Sciences and Engineering, 2022
- Appointed as a Member of the Order of Australia in the 2023 King's Birthday Honours for "significant service to chemistry education, research and scholarship".
