= Trewhella =

Trewhella is a Cornish habitational surname for a location in St Hilary, Cornwall. Notable people with the surname include:

- David Trewhella (born 1962), Australian rugby league footballer
- Ian Trewhella (1945–2024), Australian Paralympic athlete
- Jill Trewhella, Australian biophysicist
- Robert Trewhella (1830–1909), English railway engineer
