= Peter Waterhouse (scientist) =

British-Australian virologist and geneticist

Peter Michael Waterhouse is a British-Australian plant virologist and geneticist. He is a professor at the Queensland University of Technology and a Chief Investigator at the ARC Centre of Excellence for Plant Success in Nature and Agriculture.

== Biography ==
Peter Waterhouse received his Bachelor of Science degree (1977) from the University of Newcastle upon Tyne, UK, and his Doctor of Philosophy degree (1981) from the Scottish Crop Research Institute at the University of Dundee. He joined CSIRO Plant Industry as a Research Scientist in 1981 and was the leader of the virology program from 1989 to 1999 (excluding 1992). In 2008, he was awarded the Federation Fellowship and took up a professorship in the defunct School of Molecular and Microbial Biosciences at the University of Sydney. Following the conclusion of this fellowship, Waterhouse left the University of Sydney and took up a professorial appointment at the Queensland University of Technology in 2014.

In the late 1990s, Waterhouse led the CSIRO group which discovered that gene silencing and transgene-mediated virus resistance in plants were induced and targeted by double-stranded RNAs.

His published work has received more than 14,400 citations (SCOPUS), giving him an h-index of 57.

== Awards ==
- Victor Chang Medal (2002)
- IMTC-ISI / Thomson Highly Cited in Field Award (2004)
- CSIRO Chairman's Medal (2005) (with Ming-Bo Wang)
- Winner of The Bulletin's Smartest Scientists in Australia (2007) (with Ming-Bo Wang)
- Prime Minister's Prize for Science (2007) (with Ming-Bo Wang)
- Australian Research Council Federation Fellowship (2008)
- Elected Fellow of the Australian Academy of Science (2009)
- Australian Laureate Fellowship 2016

== Publications ==
1. Waterhouse, P. M.; Graham, M. W.; Wang, M. -B. (1998). "Virus resistance and gene silencing in plants can be induced by simultaneous expression of sense and antisense RNA". Proceedings of the National Academy of Sciences. 95 (23): 13959–64. Bibcode:1998PNAS...9513959W. doi:10.1073/pnas.95.23.13959. PMC 24986. PMID 9811908.
2. Wesley, S. V.; Helliwell, C. A.; Smith, N. A.; Wang, M.; Rouse, D. T.; Liu, Q.; Gooding, P. S.; Singh, S. P.; Abbott, D.; Stoutjesdijk, P. A.; Robinson, S. P.; Gleave, A. P.; Green, A. G.; Waterhouse, P. M. (2001). "Construct design for efficient, effective and high-throughput gene silencing in plants". The Plant Journal. 27 (6): 581–590. doi:10.1046/j.1365-313X.2001.01105.x. PMID 11576441. S2CID 40167901.
3. Waterhouse, P. M.; Wang, M. B.; Lough, T. (2001). "Gene silencing as an adaptive defence against viruses". Nature. 411 (6839): 834–842. Bibcode:2001Natur.411..834W. doi:10.1038/35081168. PMID 11459066. S2CID 4420348.
4. Waterhouse, P. M.; Smith, N. A.; Singh, S. P.; Wang, M. B.; Stoutjesdijk, P. A.; Green, A. G. (2000). "Total silencing by intron-spliced hairpin RNAs". Nature. 407 (6802): 319–320. doi:10.1038/35030305. PMID 11014180. S2CID 4425570.
5. Waterhouse, P. M.; Helliwell, C. A. (2003). "Exploring plant genomes by RNA-induced gene silencing". Nature Reviews Genetics. 4 (1): 29–38. doi:10.1038/nrg982. PMID 12509751. S2CID 12435705.
6. Wang, M. B.; Abbott, D. C.; Waterhouse, P. M. (2000). "A single copy of a virus-derived transgene encoding hairpin RNA gives immunity to barley yellow dwarf virus". Molecular Plant Pathology. 1 (6): 347–356. doi:10.1046/j.1364-3703.2000.00038.x. PMID 20572982.
7. Wang, M. -B. (2004). "On the role of RNA silencing in the pathogenicity and evolution of viroids and viral satellites". Proceedings of the National Academy of Sciences. 101 (9): 3275–3280. Bibcode:2004PNAS..101.3275W. doi:10.1073/pnas.0400104101. PMC 365780. PMID 14978267.
