= Liu Yun =

Liu Yun or Yun Liu may refer to:

- Liu Yun (governor) (died 951), Later Han governor
- Liu Yun (handballer) (born 1982), Chinese handball player
- Liu Yun (actress) (born 1983), Chinese actress
- Liu Yun (footballer) (born 1995), Chinese footballer
- Yun Liu (materials chemist), Chinese and Australian scientist and professor
