= Cyrille Boyer =

- Education: École Nationale Supérieure de Chimie de Montpellier (Msc), University of Montpellier II (PhD)
- Occupations: Polymer Chemist, Researcher, Professor
- Employer(s): University of New South Wales (UNSW), Australian Centre for NanoMedicine
- Known for: Light-activated polymerisation, depolymerisation, recycling methods using photocatalysts
- Title: Professor, Associate Dean, Codirector, Deputy Head of School (Research)

Cyrille Andre Boyer is a polymer chemist, researcher and professor at the University of New South Wales (UNSW Sydney). He serves as the Deputy Head of School (Research) for the School of Chemical Engineering, and is the codirector of the Australian Centre for NanoMedicine. His research primarily focuses on polymer synthesis, nanomedicine, and the design of nanomaterials used for biomedicine and environmental sustainability. His contributions to polymer nanotechnology have advanced how polymers are created and manipulated.

== Education ==
Boyer received his master's degree in polymer science from the École Nationale Supérieure de Chimie de Montpellier (ENSCM) and his doctor of philosophy (PhD) in 2005 at the University of Montpellier II (now University of Montpellier).

== Career ==
Boyer completed his education in France before moving to join UNSW where he leads the Boyer Lab. Additionally, he holds an Australian Laureate Fellowship alongside leadership positions within UNSW, these being the deputy head of school (research) for the School of Chemical Engineering and co-director of the Australian Centre for NanoMedicine.

His revolutionary work on light-activated polymerization using photocatalysts and reversible-deactivation using radical polymerization (RDRP). More specifically, Boyer focuses on developing Photoinduced Electron Transfer-Reversible Addition-Fragmentation Chain Transfer (PET-RAFT) polymerization and photo-flow polymerization. These innovations have transformed how polymers are created and manipulated.

In addition to his work on polymer synthesis and nanomedicine, Boyer's research includes photo-curing 3D printing, computational photocatalyst design, and sustainability initiatives involving photocatalytic depolymerization and recycling techniques.

== Awards ==
- ARC Australian Laureate Fellowship (2024).
- Member of the Australian Research Council – College of Experts (2022–2024, 2016–2019).
- Fellow of the European Academy of Sciences (2020).
- Fellow of the Australian Academy of Science (FAA).
- Royal Society of Chemistry – Polymer Chemistry Lectureship Award (2018).
- Polymer International – IUPAC Young Investigator Award (2018).
- Chemical Engineering Research Excellence Award, IChemE / Monash University (2018).
- Finalist, Australian Museum Eureka Prize for Scientific Research (2016, 2017).
- American Chemical Society – ACS Macromolecules / Biomacromolecules Young Investigator Award (2016).
- Journal of Polymer Science Innovation Award, ACS Division of Polymeric Materials (2016).
- LeFevre Memorial Prize, Australian Academy of Science (2016).
- Prime Minister’s Science Prize – Malcolm McIntosh Prize for Physical Scientist of the Year (2015).
- ARC Future Fellowship (2013–2016).
- Scopus Young Researcher of the Year Award – Engineering and Technology (2012).
- ARC Australian Post-Doctoral Fellowship (2009).
