= Ross Buckley =

Ross Buckley may refer to:

- E. Ross Buckley (1921–1992), American lawyer and politician
- Ross P. Buckley, Australian lawyer and academic
