= Terry Hughes (biologist) =

Irish biologist

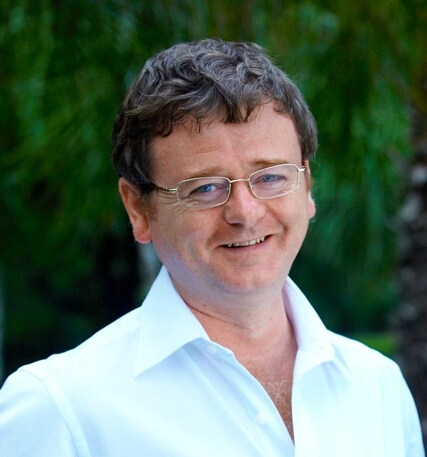
Distinguished Professor Terry Hughes FAA, ARC Laureate Fellow and Director of the ARC Centre of Excellence for Coral Reef Studies, James Cook University.

Terence P. Hughes (born 1956, in Dublin, Ireland) is a professor of marine biology at James Cook University in Queensland, Australia. He is known for research on the global coral bleaching event caused by climate change. Nature dubbed him "Reef sentinel" in 2016 for the global role he plays in applying multi-disciplinary science to securing reef sustainability. He is an Australian Research Council Laureate Fellow and Director of the Australian Research Council (ARC) Centre of Excellence for Coral Reef Studies. His research interests encompass coral reef ecology, macroecology and evolution, as well as social-ecological interactions. His recent work has focused on marine ecology, macroecology, climate change, identifying safe planetary boundaries for human development, and on transformative governance of the sea in Australia, Chile, China, the Galapagos Islands, Gulf of Maine and the Coral Triangle. His career citations in Google Scholar exceed 88,000.

== Education and career ==
Hughes was awarded a PhD in Ecology and Evolution from Johns Hopkins University, Baltimore, USA, in 1984, for his research on coral life histories, phase-shifts and the resilience of Caribbean coral reefs. Following his PhD, he was an NSF Postdoctoral Research Fellow and Lecturer at the University of California, Santa Barbara (1984-1990) before moving to James Cook University in Townsville, Australia. He was appointed Professor in 2000 and established the ARC Centre of Excellence for Coral Reef Studies in 2005. Hughes has published in excess of 180 peer reviewed publications, so far. The ARC Centre produces greater than 350 publications annually and was recently awarded further funding until 2021.

== Awards ==
In 2001, Hughes was elected to the Fellowship of the Australian Academy of Science for his contribution to coral reef science. He has been awarded the Centenary Medal of Australia for his services to Australian society and marine biology, a Silver Jubilee Award for Excellence by the Australian Marine Science Association, the Australian Museum Eureka Sherman Prize for Environmental Science, a 2012 Australian Laureate Fellowship, and the Darwin Medal by the International Society for Reef Studies. In 2014, he was awarded an Einstein Professorship by the Chinese Academy of Sciences. Hughes was joint winner of the 2018 John Maddox Prize, awarded by Nature and Sense about Science. In 2018, Hughes was also awarded the A.G. Huntsman Award for Excellence in the Marine Sciences and the Climate Change Award from the Prince Albert II of Monaco Foundation. In 2019, Trinity College Dublin awarded him with an honorary doctorate. He and Catherine Lovelock were jointly awarded the Suzanne Cory Medal by the Australian Academy of Science in March 2023.

== Selected bibliography ==
- Catastrophes, phase-shifts, and large-scale degradation of a Caribbean coral reef. Hughes, T.P., Science (1994) 265:1547-1551.
- Climate change, human impacts, and the resilience of coral reefs. Hughes, T.P., A.H. Baird, D.R. Bellwood, et al., Science (2003) 301:929-933.
- Confronting the coral reef crisis. Bellwood, D.R., T.P. Hughes, C. Folke, and M. Nyström, Nature (2004) 429:827-833.
- New paradigms for supporting the resilience of marine ecosystems. Hughes, T.P., D.R. Bellwood, C. Folke, et al., Trends in Ecology and Evolution (2005) 20:380-386.
- Regime-shifts, herbivory and the resilience of coral reefs to climate change. Hughes, T.P., M.J. Rodrigues, D.R. Bellwood, et al., Current Biology (2007) 17:360-365.
- Rising to the challenge of sustaining coral reef resilience. Hughes, T.P., N. Graham, J.B.C. Jackson, et al., Trends in Ecology and Evolution (2010) 25:633-642.
- Living dangerously on borrowed time during unrecognized regime shifts. Hughes, T.P., C. Linares, V. Dakos, et al., Trends in Ecology and Evolution (2012) 28:149-155.
- Global warming and recurrent mass bleaching of corals. Hughes, T.P., and 43 co-authors. Nature (2017) 543: 373–377.
- Global warming transforms coral reef ecosystems. Hughes, T.P. and 14 co-authors. Nature (2017) 556: 492 – 496.
- Spatial and temporal patterns of mass bleaching of corals in the Anthropocene. Hughes T.P., and 24 co-authors. Science (2018) 359: 80 – 83.
- Ecological memory modifies the cumulative impact of recurrent climate extremes. Hughes TP, and 12 co-authors. Nature Climate Change (2019) 9: 40–43.
- Global warming impairs stock-recruitment dynamics of corals. Hughes T.P., and 17 co-authors. (2019). Nature 568, 387–390.
