= Joanna Mossop =

New Zealand law professor

Academic background
- Education: Columbia University
- Thesis: International fisheries law and adaptive management : addressing scientific uncertainty in ecosystem management (2002)

Academic work
- Institutions: Victoria University of Wellington, Victoria University of Wellington, Faculty of Law

Joanna Claire Mossop is a New Zealand academic, and is a full professor at Victoria University of Wellington, specialising in the law of the sea, including conservation law, and laws outside national jurisdictions.

== Academic career ==
Mossop completed a double degree at Victoria University of Wellington and joined Buddle Findlay as a solicitor. She then left New Zealand to complete a master of laws degree at Columbia University. Her 2002 thesis was on the relationship between scientific uncertainty in international fisheries law and adaptive management. On her return, Mossop joined the faculty of Victoria University, rising to full professor in 2022. Mossop spent several months over 2019–2020 at the Edinburgh Law School on a McCormick Fellowship. She has also been a visiting professor at the University of Lincoln.

Mossop works on public international law, and has published on maritime security, and how to reconcile economic activity in marine environments with biodiversity protection. Mossop is a co-principal investigator on a 2021 Marsden grant "Reimagining ocean law to achieve equitable and sustainable use of marine ecosystems".

Mossop has been or is on the editorial boards of a number of journals, including Marine Policy, the New Zealand Yearbook of International Law and the Asia Pacific Journal of Oceans Law and Policy.

Mossop was Vice President of the Australian and New Zealand Society of International Law. She is a member of the IUCN Commission on Environmental Law, and in 2019 she was nominated by the New Zealand government to the list of arbitrators and conciliators in Annex V and VII of the United Nations Convention on the Law of the Sea, and was the only non-government legal adviser of the four New Zealand nominations. She was involved in the Biodiversity Beyond National Jurisdiction Treaty.

== Awards and honours ==
Mossop won university teaching awards in 2018 and 2021.

Mossop's 2016 book The Continental Shelf Beyond 200 Nautical Miles jointly won the J. F. Northey Memorial Prize. The prize is awarded by the Legal Research Foundation for the best legal book by a New Zealand author.

== Selected works ==
=== Books ===
- Mossop, Joanna (December 2016). The Continental Shelf Beyond 200 Nautical Miles: Rights and Responsibilities. Oxford University Press. doi:10.1093/law/9780198766094.001.0001. ISBN 978-0-19-876609-4.
- Mossop, Joanna; Klein, Natalie; Rothwell, Donald R., eds. (9 October 2009). Maritime Security: International Law and Policy Perspectives from Australia and New Zealand. Routledge. doi:10.4324/9780203867471. ISBN 978-0-203-86747-1.

=== Journal articles ===
- Mossop, Joanne C.; Schofield, Clive (2020). "Adjacency and due regard: The role of coastal States in the BBNJ treaty". Marine Policy. 122 103877. doi:10.1016/j.marpol.2020.103877. Wikidata Q114732835.
- Mossop, Joanne C. (25 July 2022), Maritime Security and the Law of the Sea, pp. 86–95, doi:10.4324/9781003001324-9, Wikidata Q124302429
- Mossop, Joanne C. (2016). "Protests against Oil Exploration at Sea: Lessons from the Arctic Sunrise Arbitration". International Journal of Marine and Coastal Law. 31 (1): 60–87. doi:10.1163/15718085-12341383. Wikidata Q124302430.
- Mossop, Joanne C. (30 October 2015), Reconciling activities on the extended continental shelf with protection of the marine environment, doi:10.4337/9781781004777.00017, Wikidata Q124302431
- Mossop, Joanne C. (2007). "Protecting Marine Biodiversity on the Continental Shelf Beyond 200 Nautical Miles". Ocean Development and International Law. 38 (3): 283–304. doi:10.1080/00908320701530474. Wikidata Q124302435.
- Crespo, Guillermo; Mossop, Joanne C.; Dunn, Daniel; et al. (2020). "Beyond static spatial management: Scientific and legal considerations for dynamic management in the high seas". Marine Policy. 122 104102. doi:10.1016/j.marpol.2020.104102. Wikidata Q112606062.
