= Elaine Holmes =

Australian systems biologist, and chemist

- Born: July 3, 1966
- Education: University of London
- Scientific career
- Fields: Metabolomic chemistry
- Institutions: Murdoch University
- Website: https://researchportal.murdoch.edu.au/esploro/profile/elaine_holmes/output/publication?institution=61MUN_INST

Elaine Holmes is an Australian systems biologist, and chemist, who was elected a fellow of the Australian Academy of Science in 2023. She was awarded an ARC Laureate Fellowship in 2020. She is a computational biologist working in metabolomic phenotyping, spectrometry and translational clinical medicine, at Murdoch University, and also holds a chair at Imperial College.

== Education and career ==
Holmes received a BSc in biology from Goldsmiths College, University of London, and a PhD in analytical chemistry from Birkbeck College, at the University of London. She was the first person in her family to attend university. At Imperial College, Holmes was head of department of the Division of Computational and Systems Medicine, as well as a professor of chemical biology, located within the Department of Surgery and Cancer. She was a professor of Computational Science at Murdoch University in 2024.

Holmes is the director of the Centre for Computational & Systems medicine, and Director and co-founder of Melico Sciences Limited, a UK-based precision nutrition start-up, and director of Metabometrix Limited, an Imperial College London spin-off company incorporated in April 2000 and specializing in molecular phenotyping, clinical diagnostics and toxicological screening via metabolomics.

Holmes was awarded a $3 million fellowship from the Australian Research Council for aging and biochemistry research. Her research involves gut microbial influences on human health, in particular, examining liver, metabolomic and gastrointestinal diseases. These diseases include diabetes and dementia.

Holmes is on the editorial boards of the Journal of Biological Chemistry, and Analytical Biochemistry. Her research has been described by the BBC, including impacts on the body from chamomile tea and how herbal mixtures can help impact gut microbiome health.

== Publications ==
Holmes has over 92,000 citations, as at June 2024, according to Google Scholar. Her H-index is 147, and she has publications in Science, Nature Reviews, Nature Protocols, the Proceedings of the National Academy of Sciences, and Nature. Holmes has also published with Fiona Woods, surgeon and burns specialist.

Select publications include:

- Ryan, Monique J et al. (2023) “Nonsevere Burn Induces a Prolonged Systemic Metabolic Phenotype Indicative of a Persistent Inflammatory Response Postinjury.” Journal of Proteome Research (2023).
- Nicholson, J. K., Lindon, J. C., & Holmes, E. (1999). “Metabonomics”: understanding the metabolic responses of living systems to pathophysiological stimuli via multivariate statistical analysis of biological NMR spectroscopic data. Xenobiotica, 29(11), 1181–1189. https://doi.org/10.1080/004982599238047
- Holmes, E., Loo, R., Stamler, J. et al. (2008) Human metabolic phenotype diversity and its association with diet and blood pressure. Nature 453, 396–400. https://doi.org/10.1038/nature06882

== Awards ==
- 2023 – Fellow of the Australian Academy of Science
- 2020 – ARC Laureate Fellow.
- 2020 – Women in Tech awards.
- 2018 – Fellow of the Academy of Medical Sciences.
- 2018 – WA Premier's Fellow in Phenomics.
- 2018 – Royal Society for Chemistry medal.
