= Jie Lu =

Computer scientist

Jie Lu AO
- Awards: Australian Laureate Fellowship; 2019

Academic background
- Education: Curtin University (PhD)

Academic work
- Discipline: Computer scientist
- Sub-discipline: Computational intelligence; Information systems; Machine learning
- Institutions: University of Technology Sydney

Jie Lu AO is a scientist in the area of computational intelligence and Distinguished Professor at the University of Technology Sydney.

In 2000, Lu earned her PhD from Curtin University in Perth.

She made fundamental contributions in the areas of fuzzy transfer learning, concept drift, data-driven decision support systems, and recommender systems.

From 2004 to 2006, she was associate professor, since 2007 she has a full professorship in the Faculty of Engineering and Information Technology at the University of Technology.

In September 2019 she was awarded with the Australian Laureate Fellowship.

Lu is editor-in-chief of the journal Knowledge-Based Systems published by Elsevier.

Lu was appointed an Officer of the Order of Australia in the 2023 Australia Day Honours, recognising her contribution to engineering, computer science and artificial intelligence.
