= Anne Orford =

Australian International law scholar

Anne Orford FASSA
- Awards: Kathleen Fitzpatrick Laureate Fellowship, 2015

Academic background
- Education: University of Adelaide PhD
- Thesis: Securing the new world order: an analysis of representations of the legality of Security Council actions in the post-Cold War era (1999)
- Doctoral advisor: Hilary Charlesworth

Academic work
- Discipline: International law
- Institutions: Melbourne Law School

Anne Orford FASSA is a professor of law and an ARC Australian Laureate Fellow at the University of Melbourne.

Her main focus of research are in the areas of public international law, history and theory of international law and international economic law.

She was elected a Fellow of the Academy of Social Sciences in Australia in 2016 and is a past President of the Australian and New Zealand Society of International Law, furthermore she holds the Redmond Barry Distinguished Professor title with which the University of Melbourne "recognises and rewards outstanding leaders within the University's professoriate".

She has been awarded honorary doctorates in law by the University of Gothenburg (2012), and the University of Helsinki (2017) and the Woodward Medal for Excellence in Humanities and Social Sciences by the University of Melbourne. She was awarded the Kathleen Fitzpatrick Australian Laureate Fellowship in 2015.

== Selected books ==
Orford is author of several books including the following.

- Anne Orford; Florian Hoffmann; Martin Clark (2016). The Oxford Handbook of the Theory of International Law. Oxford University Press. ISBN 978-0-19-870195-8.
- Anne Orford (2 November 2006). International Law and its Others. Cambridge University Press. ISBN 978-1-139-46039-2.
- Anne Orford (30 June 2021). International Law and the Politics of History. Cambridge University Press. ISBN 978-1-108-48094-9.
- Anne Orford (20 January 2011). International Authority and the Responsibility to Protect. Cambridge University Press. ISBN 978-1-139-49424-3.
