= Anya Reading =

Australian geophysicist

Anya M. Reading
- Education: University of Edinburgh (BSc 1991), University of Leeds (Ph.D 1997)
- Years active: 1992–present
- Known for: Work in seismology and computational methods; Antarctic research
- Title: Professor of Geophysics
- Website: https://www.utas.edu.au/profiles/staff/imas-agp/anya-reading

Anya Marie Reading is a professor of Geophysics and Associate Head of Research in the School of Natural Sciences, University of Tasmania.

== Early life and education ==
Reading completed her undergraduate education at the University of Edinburgh, UK, receiving a BSc (Hons) in geophysics in 1991. She earned a PhD from the University of Leeds, UK, which was conferred in 1997. Her thesis developed seismological methods to study the subduction zone beneath New Zealand. Reading continues to focus on Southern Hemisphere continental lithosphere, with emphasis on Australia and Antarctica, and technique development in seismology and computational physical sciences.

== Career and impact ==
Reading's career includes multiple field seasons in Antarctica and Australia which expanded the seismic data available for these regions through the deployment of temporary networks of instruments. Using seismic energy as a means of learning about hidden regions of the continents, her work demonstrated the association between the structure of continents at depth, and the history of plate tectonics for that region.

In 2014, she led research at the University of Tasmania that developed earthquake technology to track deep ocean storms, which "play a key role in global climate". Reading also uses seismology to understand the interaction between glaciers and the bedrock beneath, and coordinates community initiatives in interdisciplinary Antarctic science.

Reading was an early pioneer of computational methods that apply machine learning to geoscience data. This has greatly expanded the analysis toolbox for geophysicists in both fundamental and applied research areas. Such approaches have an added benefit of being able to integrate numerical and categorical data in multivariate syntheses. She has also worked on data visualization methods for the geosciences.

Reading has served on numerous research strategy and policy development committees including the Australian Academy of Science National Committee for Earth Sciences, and also as Director of the Australian National Facility for Earth Sounding, ANSIR. She founded the Computational Geophysics and Earth Informatics Group within the School of Natural Sciences at University of Tasmania in 2010.

In 2017, Reading became the first female Professor of Geophysics in Australia and also undertook research visits in connection with the award of a Fulbright Senior Scholarship. She undertakes science outreach including the coordination of the Tasmanian component of the Australian Seismometers in Schools, AuSIS.

== Awards and honours ==
Reading was awarded a Fulbright senior scholarship in 2017.

In 2025, she was awarded the Georgina Sweet Australian Laureate Fellowship by the Australian Research Council to research the subsurface of Antarctica.
