= Marilyn Fleer =

Australian emeritus professor

Marilyn Fleer FASSA
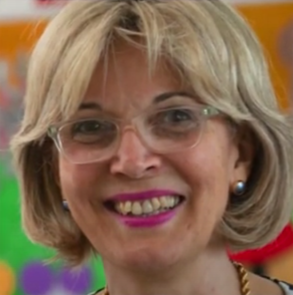
- Born: Marilyn Charlotte Anne Fleer
- Occupation: Academic
- Awards: Kathleen Fitzpatrick Australian Laureate Fellowship

Academic background
- Education: University of New England
- Alma mater: University of Queensland
- Thesis: Early childhood science education: The teaching-learning process as scaffolding conceptual change (1991)

Academic work
- Discipline: Psychologist
- Institutions: Monash University
- Main interests: Early childhood education

Marilyn Fleer FASSA is an Australian professor of early childhood education and development at Monash University in Melbourne, Australia. She was awarded the Kathleen Fitzpatrick Australian Laureate Fellowship by the Australian Research Council in 2018.

== Biography ==
Fleer grew up in Narrikup, Western Australia, a rural farming community. She graduated from the University of New England with a MEd in 1988. She moved to the University of Queensland where she completed a PhD in 1991.

Fleer's research is focused on early childhood "concept formation", in particular the developmental meaning of conceptual play. Her work has especially focused on how young children learn science, technology, engineering, and mathematics concepts through play.

She was elected Fellow of the Academy of the Social Sciences in Australia in November 2021 and inducted onto the Victorian Honour Roll of Women in 2022.

She was a President of the International Society of Cultural-historical Activity Research (ISCAR) and a recipient of the Vygotsky Institute medal for contributions to advancing cultural-historical research.

She holds honorary positions at the University of Oxford, Western Norway University and Aarhus University in Denmark.

== Works ==
- Marilyn Fleer (2014). Theorising Play in the Early Years. Cambridge University Press. ISBN 978-1-107-03229-3.
- Marilyn Fleer (16 January 2018). Child Development in Educational Settings. Cambridge University Press. ISBN 978-1-316-63188-1.
- Marilyn Fleer (24 March 2021). Play in the Early Years. Cambridge University Press. ISBN 978-1-00-905316-7.
- Marilyn Fleer (8 September 2015). Science for Children. Cambridge University Press. ISBN 978-1-107-54870-1.
- Marilyn Fleer (7 October 2023). https://shows.acast.com/playlab-podcast
