= Glenda Sluga =

Australian historian

Glenda Anna Sluga FAHA is an Australian historian who has contributed significantly to the history of internationalism, nationalism, diplomacy, immigration, and gender in Europe, Britain, France, Italy, Yugoslavia, and Australia.

From 2020 to 2024 Sluga was professor of International History and Capitalism at the European University Institute in Italy, director of the European Research Council Project ECOINT, and joint chair of the Department of History and Civilization and the Robert Schumann Centre for Advanced Studies. She was on secondment from her post as professor of International History at the University of Sydney.

== Life ==
Sluga was born in Melbourne. Her parents were Cold War refugees in the 1950s from Slovenian territory of the former Yugoslavia near Trieste. She was raised in the western suburbs of Melbourne and attended Mount Saint Joseph's Girls College in Altona West.

== Education ==
She completed her BA (Hons) with First-Class Honours in 1985 at the University of Melbourne where she also received her MA (Hons) in 1987. Her thesis was published in 1988 under the title “Bonegilla, a place of no hope”, and received the Vaccari Trust Award for new work on immigration history. In 1986, she received a Rae and Edit Bennet Scholarship for postgraduate study in the UK and was award a Fulbright Travelling Scholarship. However, in 1988, Sluga attended the University of Sussex using a British Council Commonwealth Scholarship, where she received her DPhil in 1993 with her thesis "Liberating Trieste, 1945–1954: nation, history, and the Cold War".

== Career ==
In 1988, prior to attending the University of Sussex, Sluga was a lecturer at the University of Melbourne. From 1991 to 1992 she was a lecturer in Australian Studies at Eötvos Lorand University, Budapest and Kossuth Lajos University, Debrecen, Hungary. In 1993, she became a lecturer in Modern European History in the Department of History at the University of Sydney, where she was promoted to senior lecturer in 1999 and associate professor in 2003. She took a year's break in 2004 to teach as associate professor at the Australian Centre, the University of Melbourne. Since 2008, she has been professor of International History at the University of Sydney, though she was seconded to the European University Institute as professor of International History and Capitalism from 2020 to 2024. In 2010, Sluga became the head of the School of Philosophical and Historical Inquiry (SOPHI) at the University of Sydney, and was deputy head from 2011 to 2013.

In 2014 she was awarded a five-year Australian Research Council Kathleen Fitzpatrick Laureate Fellowship for her project Inventing the International. She worked with a young team that included Natasha Wheatley, Philippa Hetherington, Sophie Loy-Wilson, Benjamin Huf, Yves Rees, Marigold Black, Beatrice Wayne, Sarah Dunstan, and Sabine Selchow.

Sluga is currently directing the five-year research project Twentieth-Century International Economic Thinking, and the Complex History of Globalization (ECOINT) The project is funded by the European Research Council's Advanced Research Grant, and looks at how economic thinking has shaped globalization with a focus on the impact of women economic thinkers and business NGOs in international institutions.

Sluga's research focuses on modern European history, the East and West from the 18th–20th century, the history of capitalism, European empires in Asia-Pacific, the history of internationalism and nationalism, settler societies, diplomatic history, environmental history, women, and gender. She has been published in Italian, Spanish, and Swedish, and speaks English, French, Italian, and Slovenian.

She is the consulting editor of the Journal of the History of Ideas.

== Awards ==
In 2002, Sluga received the Australian Academy of the Humanities' biennial Max Crawford Medal, which recognizes outstanding achievements in the humanities by young Australian scholars contributing towards the understanding of their discipline by the general public. She was elected to the Australian Academy of the Humanities in 2009, and was a founding member of the International Scientific Committee for the History of UNESCO from 2006 to 2010. She was the 2014–2018 recipient of the Australian Research Council's Kathleen Fitzpatrick Laureate Fellowship.

She has been a visiting fellow at Monash University (1996); the Australian National University (1997); the Institute des Études Politiques de Paris (2000); the European University Institute, Florence (2001); Cambridge University (2001 & 2007); Harvard University (2000 & 2012); the University of Melbourne (2003); Leiden University (2003); the University of Bologna (2009); the Foundation Maison des Sciences de l'Homme, Paris (2012); and the University of Vienna (2013).

== Bibliography ==
- "The history of gendered Jewish internationalism, from the perspective of the history of internationalisms." Journal of Modern Jewish Studies 21.2 (2022): 143-147.
- The invention of international order: remaking Europe after Napoleon (Princeton University Press, 2021) online.
- "From F. Melian Stawell to E. Greene Balch: International and Internationalist Thinking at the Gender Margins, 1919–1947." in Women's International Thought: A New History (Cambridge University Press, 2021).
- with Philippa Hetherington. "Liberal and illiberal internationalisms." Journal of World History 31.1 (2020): 1-9. online
- "Remembering 1919: International organizations and the future of international order". International Affairs 95#1 (2019) pp 25-43. doi:10.1093/ia/iiy242
- Edited with P. Clavin. Internationalisms: A Twentieth-Century History. (Cambridge University Press, 2017)
- "Who Hold the Balance of the World? Bankers at the Congress of Vienna and in International History". American Historical Review, December 2017, 1403–1430. doi:10.1093/ahr/122.5.1403
- Geschichtskolumne. Anfange und End(n) der Weltordnung. Merkur, 2017, 71, 72–81. also published in English as Capitalists and Climate, Humanity, November 2017
- Edited with Carolyn James. Women, diplomacy and international politics since 1500 (Routledge, 2016).
- "Madame de Staël and the transformation of European politics, 1812–17." International History Review 37.1 (2015): 142-166. online
- Internationalism in the Age of Nationalism. University of Pennsylvania Press, 2013 online
- "UNESCO and the (one) world of Julian Huxley." Journal of World History (2010): 393-418. online
- The Problem of Trieste and the Italo-Yugoslav Border: Difference, Identity, and Sovereignty in Twentieth-Century Europe (SUNY Press, 2001).
- "Female and national self‐determination: A gender re‐reading of ‘The Apogee of nationalism'." Nations and Nationalism 6.4 (2000): 495-521. online
- "Identity, gender, and the history of European nations and nationalisms." Nations and Nationalism 4.1 (1998): 87-111. online
- "Trieste: ethnicity and the Cold War, 1945-54." Journal of Contemporary History 29.2 (1994): 285-303.
