= Jennifer Smith-Merry =

Researcher in health and social policy

Jennifer Smith-Merry is a professor of health and social policy at the University of Sydney and, from 2018 - 2024, was the director of the Centre for Disability Research and Policy where she now leads the disability inclusive policy development stream. Her work and research is focused on creating practical, research informed, policy and practice in relationship to mental health in partnership with both government and non-government organisations.

In 2023 she was awarded the Industry Laureate Fellowship where, from 2019 - 2029, she is partnering with the National Disability Insurance Scheme to evaluation the cost, effectiveness and access for psychosocial disability through the scheme.
