= Michelle Coote =

Australian polymer chemist

Michelle Louise Coote
- Education: University of New South Wales
- Scientific career
- Thesis: The origin of the penultimate unit effect in free-radical copolymerisation (1999)

Michelle Louise Coote FRSC FAA is an Australian polymer chemist. She has published extensively in the fields of polymer chemistry, radical chemistry and computational quantum chemistry. She is an Australian Research Council (ARC) Future Fellow, Fellow of the Royal Society of Chemistry (FRSC) and Fellow of the Australian Academy of Science (FAA).

Coote is a professor of chemistry in the Australian National University (ANU) College of Physical and Mathematical Sciences. She is a member of the ARC Centre of Excellence for Electromaterials Science and past chief investigator in the ARC Centre of Excellence for Free-Radical Chemistry and Biotechnology.

== Education and early career ==
Coote completed a B.Sc. (Hons) in Industrial Chemistry at the University of New South Wales in 1995. During her degree she spent 15 months working in the chemical industry, "but it made me realise that my real interest was in a career in pure chemical research. So, I went back to university and ended up graduating in 1995 with the university medal." Graduating in 2000 with a PhD in Polymer Chemistry from UNSW, Coote took out major awards including the Cornforth Medal from the Royal Australian Chemical Institute (RACI) and the prize for young scientists from the International Union of Pure and Applied Chemistry (IUPAC) for her PhD thesis 'The origin of the penultimate unit effect in free-radical copolymerisation'.

Coote left Australia for the UK in September 1999 to take up a Post Doctoral Research Role in polymer physics focusing on neutron reflectivity within the Polymer Interdisciplinary Research Centre at the University of Durham.

== Academic career in Australia ==
Coote returned to Australia in 2001 and joined the Research School of Chemistry, Australian National University as a postdoctoral fellow with Leo Radom. It was during this time that she began to build a reputation in computational chemistry, and she established an independent research group on the computer-aided chemical design at ANU in 2004.

Awarded an ARC Future Fellowship in 2010, Coote focused on a computer-guided experimental approach to understand and control the stereochemistry of free-radical polymerisation. Since then, Coote has received a number of grants from the Australian Research Council, including the Georgina Sweet Australian Laureate Fellowship in 2017. Today, her research interests span several broad areas of fundamental and applied chemistry: stereocontrol in free-radical polymerisation, polymer degradation and stabilisation, radical stability and, most recently, electric field effects on chemical reactivity.

Coote became the first female Professor of Chemistry at ANU in 2011.

== Awards, prizes and recognition ==
Coote received numerous awards, including the Rennie Memorial Medal (2006), David Sangster Polymer Science and Technology Achievement Award (2011) and H.G. Smith medal (2016) from the Royal Australian Chemical Institute, the Le Fevre Memorial Prize of the Australian Academy of Science (2010) and the Pople Medal of the Asia-Pacific Association for Theoretical and Computational Chemistry (2015). She was also named the 2019 Schleyer lecturer, becoming the first female and the second Australian since the series beginning in 2001.

Coote was elected a Fellow of the Royal Society of Chemistry in March 2013. She was elected a Fellow of the Australian Academy of Science in 2014 for developing and applying accurate computational chemistry for modelling radical polymerization processes. Coote gave her New Fellows' Presentation in July 2014.

Coote was recognised by ANU in 2012 as part of their International Women's day celebrations for her achievements as a role model as the first female professor of chemistry at ANU and for inspiring, mentoring and motivating female undergraduate and postgraduate students in the sciences.

In December 2016, Coote was appointed as the first Australian Associate Editor of the premier Chemistry journal, the Journal of the American Chemical Society.

== See also ==
- List of chemists
