= James McCaw =

Australian mathematical biologist

James M. McCaw
- Education: University of Melbourne
- Scientific career
- Fields: Mathematical epidmiology
- Workplaces: University of Melbourne
- Website: sites.google.com/site/jamesmccaw

James M. McCaw is an Australian mathematical biologist. He is professor of Mathematical Biology in the School of Mathematics and Statistics and in the Melbourne School of Population and Global Health at the University of Melbourne. He was Associate Dean (of Research) in Science from 2020--2021.

He is primarily known for his work in response to the COVID-19 pandemic in which he assisted in informing Australia's public health response. Prior to the COVID-19 pandemic he had carried out award winning research on infectious diseases, notably influenza and malaria. He is on the editorial board for several scholarly journals including eLife, Epidemics and PLoS Computational Biology

== Education ==
McCaw obtained his B.Sc. and PhD in theoretical physics from the University of Melbourne where he served as President of the Postgraduate Physics Students Society.

== Awards and honours ==
- 2024 Australian Research Council Australian Laureate Fellowship
- 2016 Australian Museum Eureka Prize for Infectious Diseases Research
