= Knowledge-Based Systems (journal) =

- Discipline: Computer science
- Language: English
- Edited by: Jie Lu

Publication details
- History: 1987-present
- Publisher: Elsevier
- Frequency: 24/year
- Impact factor: 8.038 (2020)

Standard abbreviations
- ISO 4: Knowl.-Based Syst.

Indexing
- ISSN: 0950-7051 (print); 1872-7409 (web)
- LCCN: 88648125
- OCLC no.: 780547490

Links
- Journal homepage; Online archive

Knowledge-Based Systems is a peer-reviewed academic journal covering computer science, with a particular focus on knowledge-based systems. It was established in 1987 and is published 24 times per year by Elsevier. The editor-in-chief is Jie Lu (University of Technology Sydney). Hamido Fujita (Iwate Prefectural University), who led the journal in the period 2010–2019, is emeritus editor. According to the Journal Citation Reports, the journal has a 2020 impact factor of 8.038.
