= Dacheng Tao =

Computer-science researcher, University of Sydney

Dacheng Tao FAA is an Australian engineer and academic. He is currently a Distinguished University Professor and Professor of Artificial Intelligence at Nanyang Technological University, Singapore. He is also the Inaugural Director of the Generative AI Lab at NTU. He received a PhD in 2007 from the University of London under Stephen Maybank. He was named a Fellow of the Institute of Electrical and Electronics Engineers in 2015, a Fellow of the Australian Academy of Science in 2018, an ACM Fellow in 2019. He was awarded an Australian Laureate Fellowship in 2017. Tao was awarded the Australian Museum's Eureka Prize for Excellence in Data Science in 2020. He has written over 300 publications across various artificial intelligence fields, including deep learning, computer vision, natural language processing, and statistical learning theory, over a career span of around 20 years.
