= Nina Wedell =

Evolutionary Biologist

- Education: Stockholm University
- Scientific career
- Workplaces: University of Exeter; University of Melbourne
- Thesis: Evolution of nuptial gifts in bushcrickets (1993)

Nina Wedell is a professor of evolutionary biology at the University of Exeter in the United Kingdom. She was appointed as the Australian Research Council Laureate Fellow in 2019. She will investigate the evolutionary dynamics of sexual conflict and insecticide resistance genes at the University of Melbourne. Professor Wedell has pioneered the field of sexual selection, and is best known for her research on female multiple mating, polyandry. Her work has encompassed many insect systems including butterflies, moths, and flies.

== Education and career ==
Wedell has a BSc (1984), an MSc (1986), a PhD (1993), and D.Sc. (1997) from Stockholm University. Following her PhD, she was a postdoc at the University of Liverpool from 1993 until 1996. Subsequently, she held research positions at Stockholm University and the University of Leeds. She took a position at the University of Exeter in 2004 as the Royal Society University Research Fellow. She was promoted to professor in 2009. Since 2018, she has also been the Associate Dean for Research.

== Research ==
Wedell's research focuses on the evolutionary role of sexual conflict. Her research has demonstrated the role of selfish genetic elements in reproductive biology using interdisciplinary approaches from evolutionary, behavioral and molecular sciences.

=== Selected publications ===
- Tregenza, Tom; Wedell, Nina (2002). "Polyandrous females avoid costs of inbreeding". Nature. 415 (6867): 71–73. Bibcode:2002Natur.415...71T. doi:10.1038/415071a. ISSN 0028-0836. PMID 11780118. S2CID 4382328.
- Tregenza, T.; Wedell, N. (2000). "Genetic compatibility, mate choice and patterns of parentage: Invited Review". Molecular Ecology. 9 (8): 1013–1027. Bibcode:2000MolEc...9.1013T. doi:10.1046/j.1365-294x.2000.00964.x. ISSN 1365-294X. PMID 10964221.
- Wedell, Nina; Gage, Matthew J.G.; Parker, Geoffrey A. (2002). "Sperm competition, male prudence and sperm-limited females". Trends in Ecology & Evolution. 17 (7): 313–320. doi:10.1016/s0169-5347(02)02533-8. ISSN 0169-5347.
- Lindholm, A. K., Dyer, K. A., Firman, R. C., Fishman, L., Forstmeier, W., Holman, L., ... & Price, T. A. (2016). The ecology and evolutionary dynamics of meiotic drive. Trends in ecology & evolution, 31 (4), 315–326.

== Awards ==
She was awarded the Australian Laureate Fellowship as recognition for her work in evolutionary biology. She received the Royal Society Wolfson Award in 2011. In 2012, she was elected President of the International Society of Behavioural Ecology. The European Molecular Biology Organization elected her as a life-long member in 2014. She is the President-Elect of the European Society of Evolutionary Biology, named in 2015.
