= Eelco J. Rohling =

American oceanographer

Eelco J. Rohling is a Dutch oceanographer. He is a fellow of the American Geophysical Union, was elected correspondent member of the Royal Netherlands Academy of Arts and Science and is a former Australian Laureate Fellow. He is the author of three books. He won a Maurice Ewing Medal in 2021.
