= Marcela Bilek =

Czech-Australian physicist

Marcela Bilek AM FAA FRSN
- Born: Marcela Bílková; Prague, Czechoslovakia
- Citizenship: Australian
- Education: University of Sydney, University of Cambridge, Rochester Institute of Technology
- Awards: Physical Scientist of the Year, Pawsey Medal, PSE Leading Scientist Award 2018, Australian Innovation Challenge Award for Health 2011, MIT TR100 Young Innovator 2003, Young Tall Poppy Award for Achievement in Science 2001
- Scientific career
- Fields: Surface science
- Workplaces: University of Sydney

Marcela Bilek AM FAA FRSN (born Marcela Bílková 1968) is a professor of applied physics and surface engineering at the University of Sydney, Australia. Her research interests focus on the use of plasma related methods to synthesise thin film materials and modify surfaces and interfaces. She was named Fellow of the American Physical Society in 2012 and Fellow of the Institute of Electrical and Electronics Engineers (IEEE) in 2015 for "contributions to the science and application of plasma processes for materials modification and synthesis".

Among her many awards are the Malcolm-McIntosh Prize for Physical Scientist of the Year in 2002 and the Pawsey Medal awarded by the Australian Academy of Science in 2004.

== Early life ==
Bilek was born in Prague, Czechoslovakia, in 1968. Prague was under a Communist regime, and her father, an engineer fluent in English and German, was outspoken against the regime. Bilek's parents decided to emigrate for the safety of her father, and to obtain a better education for their children. They emigrated in 1973 and were granted political refugee status in Australia.

Bilek's parents encouraged learning, oftentimes with her father teaching her how to do her own research and problem solving. Her parents also encouraged participating in outdoor activities. Bilek enjoyed hiking, bushwalking, and abseiling.

== Education ==
Bilek began her undergraduate studies at the University of Sydney in 1986, studying physics and computer science, enrolled in a science/law degree. After two years, she topped the class in computer science and was offered a prestigious student internship at IBM Asia-Pacific Headquarters in Tokyo, Japan, working on computer networks. She returned to Australia after a year, finishing her Bachelor of Science degree with honours by completing an honours thesis on electron microscopy and studying heterostructures. She graduated in 1990 with first class honours and a university medal.

After finishing her bachelor's degree, Bilek worked at the Comalco Research Centre in Melbourne as an industrial research scientist, working on optimising the designs of aluminium smelting cells. Two and a half years later, Bilek was awarded a scholarship to complete her PhD in engineering at the University of Cambridge, earning her doctorate in 1997. Bilek then went on to complete a Master of Business Administration (MBA) degree at Rochester Institute of Technology, College of Business, in 2000.

== Career ==
After receiving her PhD, Bilek stayed in Cambridge as a research fellow at Emmanuel College until October 2000. At the same time, Bilek collaborated at Lawrence Berkeley Laboratory, in California, working closely with Ian Brown, head of the Plasma Applications Group. During this time, Bilek was a visiting professor at Technische Universitäd Hamburg-Harburg in Germany.

In November, 2000, Bilek came back to Australia and was appointed professor of applied physics at the University of Sydney. She was the first female professor in the School of Physics at the University of Sydney, at the age of 32. Bilek is now head of the Applied Plasma Physics and Surface Engineering Research Group at the University of Sydney.

== Research ==
Bilek currently leads a large research group that specialises in materials- and energy-related technologies. Some of her research includes materials physics, plasma deposition and processing, thin-film materials, vacuum glazing, and cross-disciplinary research in biointerfaces and medicine. Bilek has published over 300 articles in international journals, 1 book, 6 book chapters, and over 10 patents. She has supervised 35 PhD students to completion and mentored 25 post-doctoral fellows as well as early career researchers.

== Awards and honours ==
Throughout Bilek's career, she has received numerous honours for her work. This includes the Malcolm-McIntosh Prize for Physical Scientist of the Year and the Edgeworth David Medal in 2002, a Young Tall Poppy Award for Achievement in Science in 2001, an ARC Federation Fellowship in 2003, named as an MIT TR100 Young Innovator in 2003, the Australian Academy of Science Pawsey Medal in 2004, an Australian Innovation Challenge Award in 2011, and the inaugural Plasma Surface Engineering Leading Scientist Award 2018. In 2013, she was elected to the Fellowship of the American Physical Society (APS), and in 2015, she was elected to the Fellowship of the Institute of Electronic and Electrical Engineers. As of April 2018, Bilek had earned over $13 million in research funding. She was awarded an Australian Laureate Fellowship in 2019 and elected a Fellow of the Royal Society of New South Wales in the same year. She was elected a Fellow of the Australian Academy of Science in 2022 and a Fellow of the Australian Institute of Physics in 2026.

Bilek was made a Member of the Order of Australia in the 2023 King's Birthday Honours for "significant service to physics and biomedical engineering".

== Publications ==
• Stacey L. Hirsh, David T. McKenzie, Neil J. Nosworthy, John A. Denman, Osman U. Sezerman, Marcela M.M. Bilek, The Vroman effect: competitive protein exchange with dynamic multilayer protein aggregates, Colloids and Surfaces B: Biointerfaces, Volume 103, 2013, Pages 395-404, ISSN 0927-7765
