= Hanna Kokko =

Finnish scientist

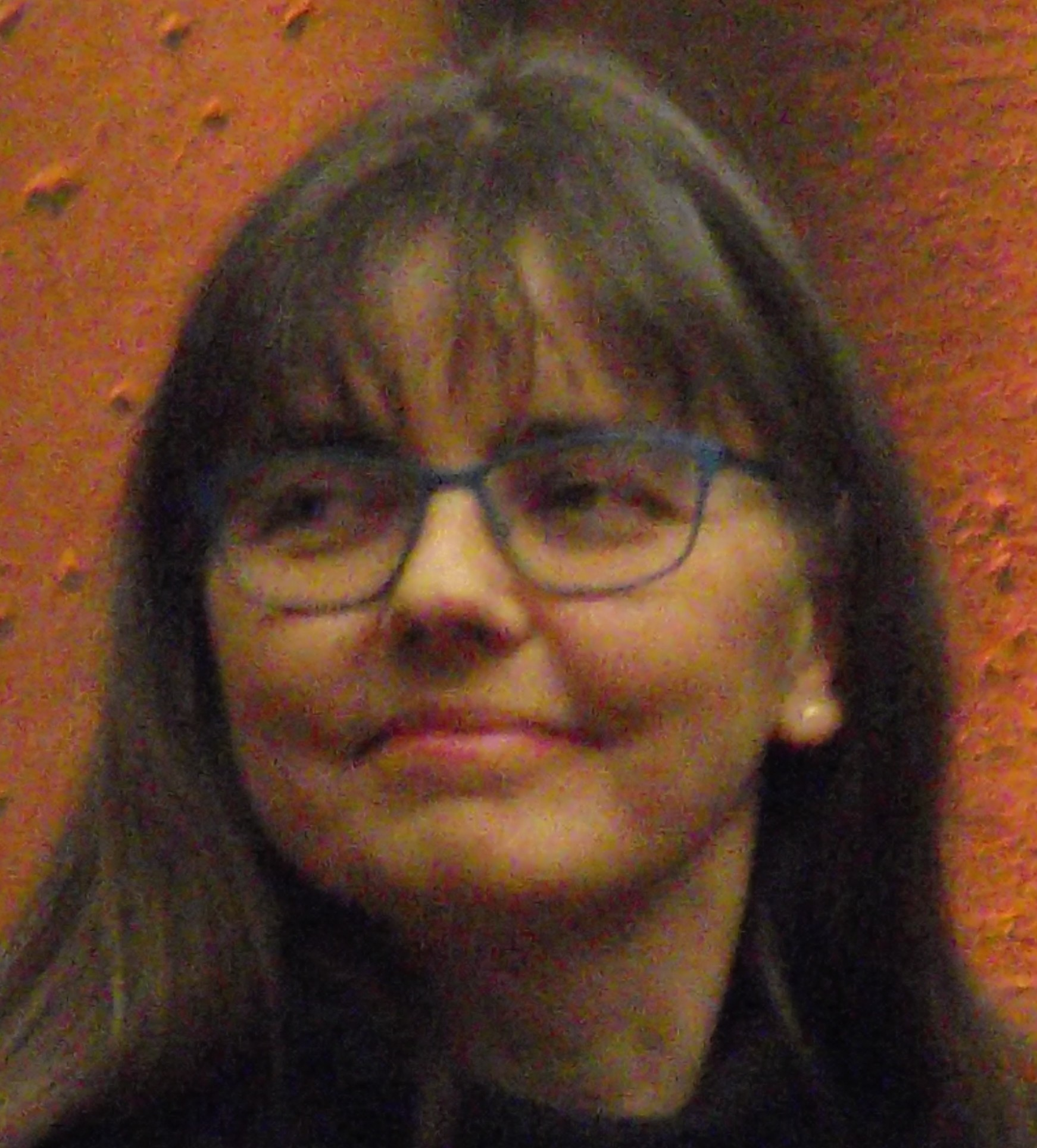
- Born: 1971 (age 54–55)
- Education: University of Helsinki (Ph.D. 1997) Helsinki University of Technology (BSc., MSc.)
- Awards: Member of the German National Academy of Sciences Leopoldina (2025); Fellow of the American Academy of Arts and Sciences (2020); Fellow of the Australian Academy of Science (2014); Australian Laureate Fellowship (2010)
- Scientific career
- Fields: Evolutionary ecology, Sustainability science
- Workplaces: University of Mainz (2023-present); University of Zurich (2014-2022); Australian National University (2010-2014); University of Helsinki (2003-2010); University of Jyväskylä (2002-2003); University of Glasgow (2000-2002); University of Cambridge (1998-2000)

Hanna Kokko (born 1971) is a scientist and full professor at the University of Mainz . She works in the fields of evolution and ecology and is known for her research on the evolution and maintenance of sex, the feedback between ecology and evolution, and the evolutionary ecology of cancer.

== Career ==
Kokko attended the Helsinki University of Technology for her undergraduate engineering degree. While there, she became interested in biology and decided to complete a one-year biology research Master's degree. She completed her Ph.D. at the University of Helsinki on the topic of sexual selection and the evolution of mate choice in 1997. During this time, she was mentored by William Sutherland.

Kokko has since held positions at the University of Cambridge, the University of Glasgow, the University of Jyväskylä, the University of Helsinki, the Australian National University, University of Zürich and she is currently a professor in evolutionary ecology at the University of Mainz supported by the Alexander von Humboldt Foundation. From 2008 to 2009 she served as co-chair of fi:Vanamo-seura.

== Awards and honors ==
Kokko's book Kutistuva turska (Shrinking Cod) was awarded the Finnish State Award for Public Information (fi:Tiedonjulkistamisen valtionpalkinto) in 2009. She received the 2010 sv:Per Brinck Oikos Award and the British Ecological Society's Founder's Prize. In 2010, she was awarded an Australian Laureate Fellowship. She became a Fellow of the Australian Academy of Science in 2014 and won the Finnish Cultural Foundation's outstanding cultural achievement award in 2016. In 2020, she became an International Honorary Member of the American Academy of Arts and Sciences. In 2025 she was elected to the German National Academy of Sciences Leopoldina in recognition of her scientific achievements.

== Selected publications ==
- Bargum, K. & Kokko, H. (2008). fi:Kutistuva turska ja muita evoluution ihmeitä, WSOY (fi). ISBN 978-951-0-34020-2
- Kokko, H. (2007). Modelling for Field Biologists (and Other Interesting People), Cambridge University Press. ISBN 9780521831321.
