= Robert Parton =

British/Australian cell biologist

Robert G. Parton
- Education: University of Edinburgh University of Leicester
- Known for: caveolae biology, endocytosis
- Scientific career
- Fields: biology, cell biology, membrane biology, electron microscopy
- Doctoral advisor: David R. Critchley
- Website: https://imb.uq.edu.au/research-groups/parton

Robert G. Parton FAA is a British/Australian cell biologist. He is a Group Leader in the Institute for Molecular Bioscience, University of Queensland and Deputy Director of the University of Queensland Centre for Microscopy and Microanalysis.

== Education ==
Parton studied biochemistry at the University of Edinburgh (1981–1984) and was awarded his PhD from the University of Leicester in 1987. He then joined the European Molecular Biology Laboratory in Heidelberg, Germany, as a post-doctoral fellow with Gareth Griffiths and Kai Simons while holding Royal Society and EMBO postdoctoral fellowships.

== Research ==
Parton started his independent research career in 1991, as a junior Group Leader (Staff Scientist) at the European Molecular Biology Laboratory. He developed his own research program in endocytosis as well as collaborating with EMBL colleagues including Kai Simons, Jean Gruenberg, Marino Zerial and Carlos Dotti. He moved to the University of Queensland in Brisbane, Australia, in 1996 to join the Centre for Microscopy and a newly formed institute which subsequently became the Institute for Molecular Bioscience.

His research revolves around the plasma membrane, with a particular focus on caveolae, lipids and endocytosis. He has made major contributions to understanding how the plasma membrane function, particularly the molecular mechanisms involved in endocytosis. He was involved in the early research and discovery of caveolins and the identification and characterization of cavins as major structural components of caveolae. His research group currently focuses on the structure and function of caveolae, pathways of endocytosis in cultured cells and in whole animals, nanoparticle delivery vectors and pathways, and the role of lipid droplets in defence against pathogens.

== Honours and awards ==
Parton is the recipient of several national and international awards. In 2009, he was elected to the Australian Academy of Science. In 2023, he was elected as an Associate Member of the European Molecular Biology Organization. He is one of the most highly cited researchers in the field of biology and biochemistry with a H-index of at least 151. In 2020, he was named the leading researcher in the field of cell biology in Australia by The Australian. He has received multiple research awards from the ARC, National Heart Foundation, Human Frontier Science Program, NHMRC, and was a Chief Investigator in the ARC Centre of Excellence in Convergent Bio-Nano Science and Technology.^{[1]} He is currently an ARC Laureate Fellow and part of the ERC-funded DRIMMS Synergy Project.

His honours and awards include (sourced from the Grants section of the UQ Researchers profile):

- NHMRC Excellence Award; highest ranked Program Grant in Australia (2007)
- Fellow of the Australian Academy of Science (2009)
- NHMRC Australia Fellowship (2009)
- NHMRC Excellence Award; highest ranked Project Grant in Australia (2010)
- President's Medal Australian Society of Cell and Developmental Biology (2011)
- NHMRC Excellence Award; highest ranked Project Grant in Australia (2013)
- ARC Laureate Fellowship (2021)
- ERC Synergy Grant (2022)
