= Jill Trewhella =

Australian biophysicist

Professor Jill Trewhella FRSN FAAAS FLANL
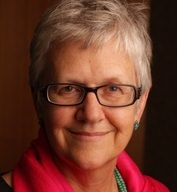

Personal details
- Born: Gosford, New South Wales, Australia
- Occupation: Biophysicist

Jill Trewhella is a biophysicist who has worked in both Australia and the United States.

== Early life ==
Born in Gosford to parents John and Joy, Trewhella planned a career as a high school mathematics teacher in Newcastle, but after the death of her brother enrolled at his alma mater, the University of New South Wales, where she received a Bachelor of Science degree with a double major in applied mathematics and physics and first class honours in physics in 1974. She also received her MSc in physics from UNSW before moving to the University of Sydney to complete her PhD in inorganic chemistry supervised by Peter Wright in 1980.

In 1991 she married Don Parkin.

== Career ==
After completing her doctorate, she spent four years at Yale University as a postdoctoral associate in the Department of Molecular Biophysics and Biochemistry. From Yale, Trewhella moved to Los Alamos National Laboratory in 1984 and held various roles there over a twenty-year period. In 1999 she was named a laboratory fellow. She was the first woman to earn the honor. By 2003 she was Bioscience Division Leader and Program Manager for the Department of Energy Office of Biological and Environmental Research. She was consulted by press and the United States government about bioterrorism during the 2001 anthrax attacks. She held an adjunct associate professorship at the University of New Mexico.

In 2004-2005 Trewhella spent a year at the University of Utah as Director of Special Projects, developing major new initiatives involving collaborative research projects and bidding successfully for a National Institutes of Health Research Centre of Excellence. She returned to Sydney in 2005 as an Australian Research Council Federation Fellow to join the School of Molecular Bioscience in the Faculty of Science at the University of Sydney.

In 2009 Trewhella took up the position of Deputy Vice-Chancellor (Research), within the University of Sydney's senior executive group. Her role was to work in partnership with academic leaders across the university to maintain and develop Sydney's research position within Australia and internationally, overseeing the development of major collaborative, cross-disciplinary research programs and providing supporting infrastructure. During her tenure the Charles Perkins Centre was established.

In 2015, Trewhella took up the Tage Erlander Visiting Professorship in Sweden, based mainly at Linköping University, where she networked with Swedish researchers to develop projects that would take advantage of new infrastructure for X-ray and neutron scattering studies to characterize materials, including biological materials where the object was to understand biological function and provide a foundation for advances in medicine and biotechnology. Having completed her Tage Erlander Visiting Professorship, she now continues her interests in science as a Professor Emerita at Sydney in the Faculty of Science and an adjunct professor of chemistry at the University of Utah.

== Research ==
Trewhella's research focuses on the use of chemistry, physics and computational methods to study bio-molecular structures as a basis for understanding their functions. She uses small angle x-ray scattering to investigate protein structure.

Trewhella has published more than 150 research papers, book chapters, essays, articles and reports. Her work has been recognised with a number of competitive research grants, awards and honours, including being named as a fellow of the Neutron Scattering Society of America in 2010, and a distinguished fellow of the Royal Society of New South Wales in 2011. She holds a joint appointment at the Bragg Institute within the Australian Nuclear Science and Technology Organisation (ANSTO) and is an adjunct professor of chemistry at the University of Utah.

== Selected publications ==
- Jacques, David A.; Trewhella, Jill (April 2010). "Small-angle scattering for structural biology-Expanding the frontier while avoiding the pitfalls: Small-Angle Scattering for Structural Biology". Protein Science. 19 (4): 642–657. doi:10.1002/pro.351. PMC 2867006. PMID 20120026.
- Heidorn, Douglas B.; Trewhella, Jill (1 February 1988). "Comparison of the crystal and solution structures of calmodulin and troponin C". Biochemistry. 27 (3): 909–915. doi:10.1021/bi00403a011. ISSN 0006-2960. PMID 3365370.
- Sosnick, T. R.; Trewhella, J. (September 1992). "Denatured states of ribonuclease A have compact dimensions and residual secondary structure". Biochemistry. 31 (35): 8329–8335. doi:10.1021/bi00150a029. ISSN 0006-2960. PMID 1525171.
- Trewhella, J.; Duff, A. P.; Durand, D.; Gabel, F.; Guss, J. M.; Hendrickson, W. A.; Hura, G. L.; Jacques, D. A.; Kirby, N. M.; Kwan, A. H.; Pérez, J.; Pollack, L.; Ryan, T. M.; Sali, A.; Schneidman-Duhovny, D. (1 September 2017). "2017 publication guidelines for structural modelling of small-angle scattering data from biomolecules in solution: an update". Acta Crystallographica Section D: Structural Biology. 73 (9): 710–728. Bibcode:2017AcCrD..73..710T. doi:10.1107/S2059798317011597. ISSN 2059-7983. PMC 5586245. PMID 28876235.
- Sali, Andrej; Berman, Helen M.; Schwede, Torsten; Trewhella, Jill; Kleywegt, Gerard; Burley, Stephen K.; Markley, John; Nakamura, Haruki; Adams, Paul; Bonvin, Alexandre M. J. J.; Chiu, Wah; Peraro, Matteo Dal; Di Maio, Frank; Ferrin, Thomas E.; Grünewald, Kay (7 July 2015). "Outcome of the First wwPDB Hybrid/Integrative Methods Task Force Workshop". Structure. 23 (7): 1156–1167. doi:10.1016/j.str.2015.05.013. ISSN 0969-2126. PMC 4933300. PMID 26095030.
