= Lynette Russell =

Australian historian and Indigenous studies researcher

Lynette Russell AM, FASSA, FAHA
- Born: 26 April 1960 (age 66); Melbourne, Victoria
- Occupation: Historian
- Years active: 21st century
- Known for: Indigenous history, interdisciplinary studies
- Awards: Fellow of the Academy of the Social Sciences in Australia (2012); Fellow of the Australian Academy of the Humanities (2018); Member of the Order of Australia (2019)

Academic background
- Education: University of Melbourne (PhD); La Trobe University (BA [Hons])
- Thesis: (Re)presented pasts: historical and contemporary constructions of Australian Aboriginalities (1995)

Lynette Wendy Russell, AM, FASSA, FAHA is an Australian historian, known for her work on the history of Indigenous Australians; in particular, anthropological history (especially during the early colonial period of Australia and the 19th century); archaeology; gender and race, Indigenous oral history, and museum studies.

== Early life and education ==
Russell was born on 27 April 1960 in an outer Melbourne suburb, into a working-class family. She has traced her Aboriginal ancestry via her grandmother from western Victoria with connections to Tasmania and the Bass Strait islands, on her father's side, and from transported convicts on her mother's side.

In 1990, Russell graduated with a Bachelor of Arts with Honours in archaeology from La Trobe University. She then undertook research in sociology and history, completing her Doctor of Philosophy at the University of Melbourne in 1995.

== Career ==
Russell has worked in various academic positions in the field of Indigenous studies and history, and has undertaken several interdisciplinary studies. She started her career as a lecturer at the Institute of Koorie Education at Deakin University after completing her PhD in 1995. From 1998 until 1999, she held a fellowship at the School of Historical Studies at Monash University, after which she was a Senior Research Fellow at the Centre for Indigenous Studies at Monash from 2000 until 2001. Russell was appointed Chair (later Director) of Monash University's Australian Indigenous Studies program in 2001, and also Deputy Dean of Arts from 2007 to 2010.

In 2011, Russell was appointed adjunct professor at the Australian Centre for Indigenous History at Australian National University. In the same year she was awarded an Australian Research Council (ARC) Professorial Fellowship for five years, as well as an ARC Discovery Grant with Leigh Boucher from Macquarie University, to undertake a study of Victorian Ethnographers between 1834 and 1930.

Russell has collaborated with scholars in archaeology, anthropology and environmental studies, and worked in various Aboriginal organisations. She holds or has held positions on committees and reference groups pertaining to Melbourne Museum, the State Library of Victoria and the Collections Council of Australia. She is particularly keen on interdisciplinary studies, and also believes that every undergraduate should undertake Indigenous studies as an essential part of the curriculum.

In October 2017, Russell gave the 2nd Bicentennial Australian History Lecture at the University of Sydney, with the title of her address being "50,000 years of Australian History: a plea for interdisciplinarity".

Russell was president of the Australian Historical Association from 2016 to 2018.

== Recognition ==
Russell is also a Fellow of the Academy of Social Sciences in Australia, a member of the Australian Institute of Aboriginal and Torres Strait Islander Studies, the Royal Anthropological Institute of Great Britain and Ireland, a Fellow of the Royal Historical Society in London and a Member of Clare Hall, Cambridge University. In 2015 she was visiting fellow at All Souls College, Oxford. In 2018 she was elected Fellow of the Australian Academy of the Humanities.

Russell was appointed a Member of the Order of Australia in the 2019 Australia Day Honours for "significant service to higher education, particularly Indigenous history, and to professional organisations".

In October 2019, Russell was awarded an Australian Research Council Laureate Fellowship with her project, "Global Encounters and First Nations Peoples: 1000 Years of Australian History", funded with A$2.94 million over five years. She was also awarded the 2019 Kathleen Fitzpatrick fellowship, which "recognises one outstanding female Laureate Fellow in the Humanities, Arts and Social Sciences". She was elected an International Honorary Member of the American Academy of Arts and Sciences in 2023.

== Selected publications ==
- Savage Imaginings: Historical and Contemporary Representations of Australian Aboriginalities (2001)
- A Little Bird Told Me: family secrets, necessary lies. Sydney: Allen & Unwin. 2002. ISBN 1865086932.
- Appropriated Pasts: Archaeology and Indigenous People in Settler Colonies, coauthored with Ian McNiven (2005)
- Roving Mariners: Aboriginal Whalers in the Southern Oceans 1790–1870 (2012)
- Hunt Them, Hang Them: 'The Tasmanians' in Port Phillip, 1841–42, with Kate Auty (2016)
- First Naturalists with Penny Olsen (2019), https://www.newsouthbooks.com.au/books/australias-first-naturalists/
- "Kevin Rudd's Indigenous apology: sorry, but not much has changed in 10 years". Lens. Monash University. 12 February 2018.
- "Fighting fire with ancient knowledge". Lens. Monash University. 8 January 2020.
