= Ross P. Buckley =

Australian academic and consultant

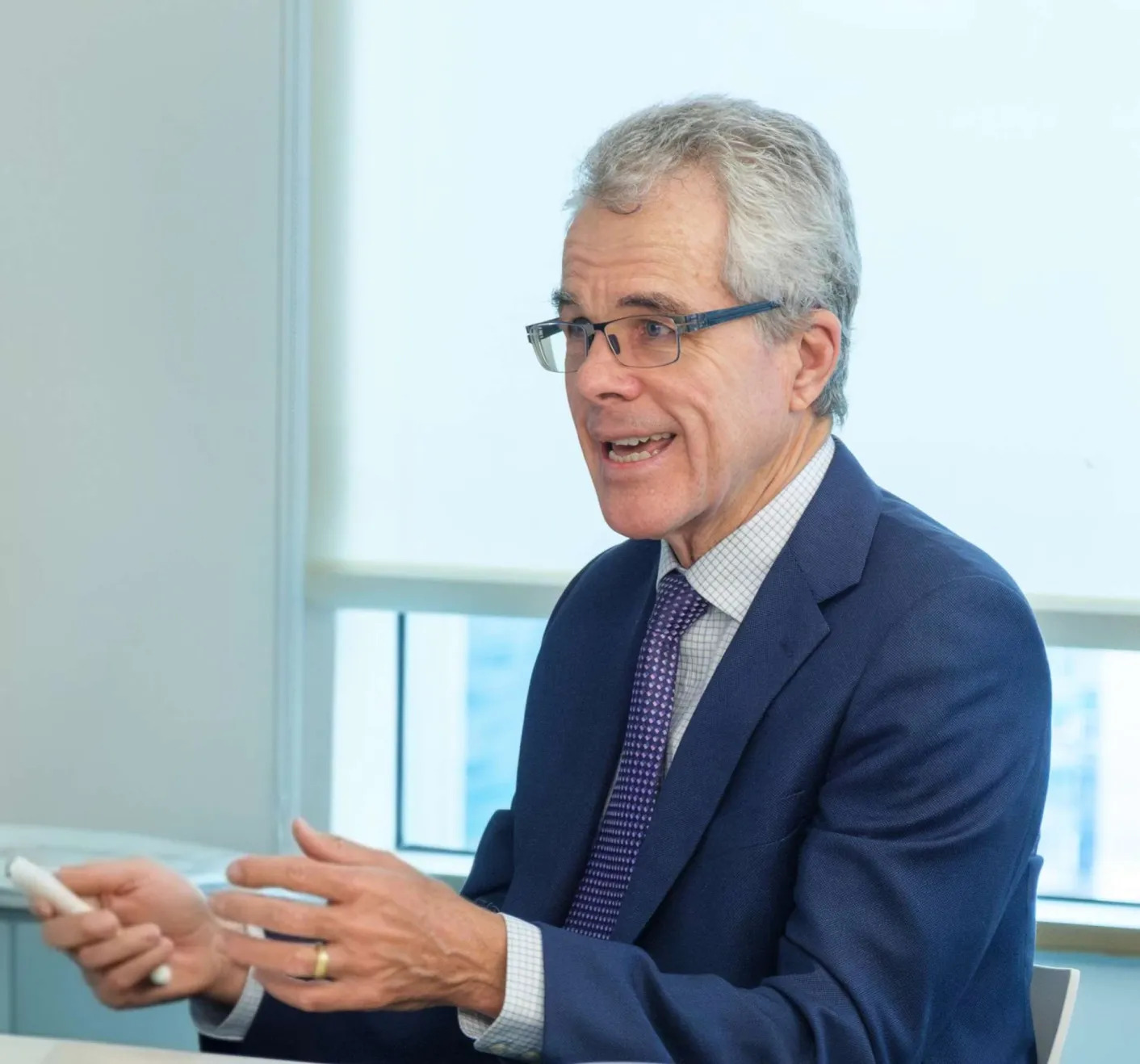

Ross P. Buckley is a Scientia Professor at the University of New South Wales (UNSW Sydney) and an Australian Research Council (ARC) Laureate Fellow. He has also twice been a Fulbright Scholar, at Yale University and Duke University. Buckley’s academic work focuses on financial technology (FinTech), regulatory technology (RegTech), digital financial services and the future of money.

Buckley is Australia’s most cited legal academic, with over 15,000 citations to his research recorded on Google Scholar. He is also one of the world’s most read legal scholars on the Social Science Research Network, where his scholarship has accumulated over 270,000 downloads. Bibliometric analysis identifies Buckley as among the most influential authors in global financial technology research, with the highest co-citation link strength in the field.

Buckley holds prominent advisory roles. In July 2023, he was appointed to the Payments System Board of the Reserve Bank of Australia, which governs the nation’s payments policy. Buckley has chaired the Australian Securities and Investments Commission’s (ASIC’s) Digital Finance Advisory Panel since 2017 and serves on several other ASIC advisory committees – including its Consultative Panel (since 2023), Simplification Consultative Group (since 2025) and Public and Private Markets Advisory Group (since 2025).

== Early life and education ==
Buckley was born in Brisbane, Queensland. He earned a Bachelor of Economics and a Bachelor of Laws (with Honours) from the University of Queensland. He later earned a PhD from UNSW Sydney and a Doctor of Laws (LL.D.) from the University of Melbourne.

== Career ==
Buckley began his legal career in Brisbane as an articled clerk and solicitor at Feez Ruthning (now Allens). He went on to work as a solicitor for Deacons in Hong Kong and then an associate with the Wall Street law firm Davis Polk & Wardwell in New York.

Transitioning to academia, Buckley joined the law faculty of Bond University, where he became a professor and served as Director of the Tim Fischer Centre for Global Trade & Finance. During this period, he was a Fulbright Coral Sea Scholar at Yale Law School, an award that supported research in international finance law.

In 2007, Buckley moved to UNSW Sydney. He was appointed a Scientia Professor and, in 2013, was named the inaugural King & Wood Mallesons Chair in International Finance Law at UNSW. That endowed professorship was expanded with joint sponsorship by KPMG Law in 2018 and retitled the “KPMG Law – King & Wood Mallesons Chair in Disruptive Innovation and Law”, a position he held until 2023.

In 2020, Buckley was awarded an ARC Laureate Fellowship to explore how law and regulation can address the “data revolution” in finance – a multi-year project running through 2027.

== Research and publications ==
Buckley’s research has attracted over A$11 million in grant funding. He has written seven books, edited five books and written over 210 book chapters, major reports and articles in leading journals in all major jurisdictions.

Buckley’s early scholarship examined the regulation of the global financial system. This work culminated in the co-authored book, From Crisis to Crisis: The Global Financial System and Regulatory Failure, which analysed systemic financial regulatory shortcomings. By the mid-2010s, his research focus shifted toward the rise of digital financial services. He led major projects on delivering banking services via mobile phones in developing countries (in collaboration with the United Nations Capital Development Fund) and then broadened to the emerging field of FinTech and its regulatory challenges.

== Impact ==
Buckley's article, The Evolution of Fintech: A New Post-Crisis Paradigm?, is among the most-cited papers in the field of financial technology law, with it establishing a historical framework that has been cited over 3,500 times. His analyses of RegTech and data-driven finance helped reconceptualise financial regulation and have been cited in reports by the Financial Stability Board, the International Monetary Fund and the World Bank, among many others. In recent years, he co-authored a comprehensive book, FinTech: Finance, Technology and Regulation, with Cambridge University Press.

Buckley frequently works with long-term co-authors Douglas W. Arner (of the University of Hong Kong) and Dirk A. Zetzsche (of the University of Luxembourg). From 2015 to 2025, they worked directly with regulatory authorities in 62 nations, helping to shape policies on digital finance and financial inclusion around the world. They also served as consultants to 40 organisations and agencies, which included the Alliance for Financial Inclusion, Arab Monetary Fund, Association of Southeast Asian Nations, Asian Development Bank, Bank for International Settlements, European Union, Financial Stability Board, G20, International Monetary Fund, International Organization of Securities Commissions, Islamic Development Bank, United Nations and the World Bank.
