= Catherine Lovelock =

Australian marine biologist and ecologist

Catherine Lovelock FAA
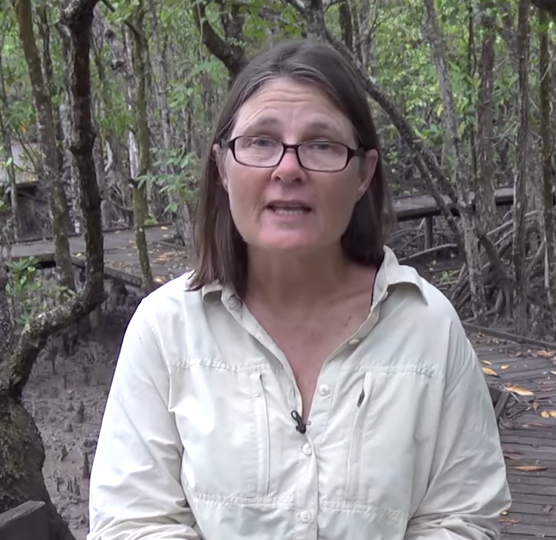
- Lovelock in 2014
- Born: 1964 (age 61–62)
- Education: University of Western Australia; James Cook University
- Awards: Georgina Sweet Australian Laureate Fellow; Suzanne Cory Medal
- Scientific career
- Workplaces: University of Queensland
- Thesis: Adaptation of tropical mangroves to high solar radiation (1991)

Catherine Ellen Lovelock FAA (born 1964) is an Australian marine ecologist, whose research focuses on coastal ecosystems. She is a professor in the School of Biological Science at the University of Queensland and 2020 Georgina Sweet Australian Laureate Fellow.

== Education ==
Lovelock has a BSc from the University of Western Australia. She received a fellowship from the Australian Institute of Marine Science to support her research for her PhD, titled "Adaptation of tropical mangroves to high solar radiation" from James Cook University (1991).

== Career ==
Lovelock began her research career with the Australian Institute of Marine Science in 1991–2. She moved to the Australian National University in 1993–4 and then continued her research at the Smithsonian Tropical Research Institute in Panama in 1995–2005. In 2005 she joined the University of Queensland, while continuing her association with the STRI.

Her long-term research has shown that damming waterways has adversely affected mangroves, particularly through the loss of mud. Writing with Daniel A. Friess, J. Boone Kauffman and James W. Fourqurean, she contributed a chapter to A Blue Carbon Primer: The State of Coastal Westland Carbon Science, Practice and Policy.

In 2020 she was awarded an Australian Laureate Fellowship and the Georgina Sweet Australian Laureate Fellowship for her research project focussing on coastal ecosystems and the effects on them of climate change and how blue carbon may mitigate those effects.

Lovelock was elected a Fellow of the Australian Academy of Science in May 2021 and is recognised as a global expert on coastal ecosystems, particularly those involving mangroves. She and Terry Hughes were awarded the Suzanne Cory Medal jointly in March 2023.

== Selected works ==
- Lovelock, Catherine (1993), Field guide to the mangroves of Queensland, Clarke, Steve (illustrator), Australian Institute of Marine Science, ISBN 978-0-642-18502-0

=== Journal articles ===
Most cited per Google Scholar:

- Krauss, Ken W.; Lovelock, Catherine E.; McKee, Karen L.; López-Hoffman, Laura; Ewe, Sharon M.L.; Sousa, Wayne P. (August 2008). "Environmental drivers in mangrove establishment and early development: A review". Aquatic Botany. 89 (2): 105–127. Bibcode:2008AqBot..89..105K. doi:10.1016/j.aquabot.2007.12.014. S2CID 85237928.
- Reef, R.; Feller, I. C.; Lovelock, C. E. (1 September 2010). "Nutrition of mangroves". Tree Physiology. 30 (9): 1148–1160. doi:10.1093/treephys/tpq048. ISSN 0829-318X. PMID 20566581.
- Mcleod, Elizabeth; Chmura, Gail L; Bouillon, Steven; Salm, Rodney; Björk, Mats; Duarte, Carlos M; Lovelock, Catherine E; Schlesinger, William H; Silliman, Brian R (December 2011). "A blueprint for blue carbon: toward an improved understanding of the role of vegetated coastal habitats in sequestering CO 2". Frontiers in Ecology and the Environment. 9 (10): 552–560. Bibcode:2011FrEE....9..552M. doi:10.1890/110004. ISSN 1540-9295.
- Veneklaas, Erik J.; Lambers, Hans; Bragg, Jason; Finnegan, Patrick M.; Lovelock, Catherine E.; Plaxton, William C.; Price, Charles A.; Scheible, Wolf-Rüdiger; Shane, Michael W.; White, Philip J.; Raven, John A. (July 2012). "Opportunities for improving phosphorus-use efficiency in crop plants". New Phytologist. 195 (2): 306–320. Bibcode:2012NewPh.195..306V. doi:10.1111/j.1469-8137.2012.04190.x. ISSN 0028-646X. PMID 22691045.
- Lovelock, Catherine E.; Cahoon, Donald R.; Friess, Daniel A.; Guntenspergen, Glenn R.; Krauss, Ken W.; Reef, Ruth; Rogers, Kerrylee; Saunders, Megan L.; Sidik, Frida; Swales, Andrew; Saintilan, Neil (October 2015). "The vulnerability of Indo-Pacific mangrove forests to sea-level rise". Nature. 526 (7574): 559–563. Bibcode:2015Natur.526..559L. doi:10.1038/nature15538. ISSN 0028-0836. PMID 26466567. S2CID 4388960.
