= Yun Liu (materials chemist) =

Chinese and Australian materials scientist

Yun Liu is a Chinese and Australian materials scientist whose research focuses on the chemistry of novel functional materials with properties including photocatalysis, photovoltaics, piezoelectricity, pyroelectricity, and electrocaloric effects, and their applications in communications, biosensors, and energy storage and conversion. She works at the Australian National University as a chair professor in the Research School of Chemistry, ARC Australian Laureate Fellow, and head of the Functional Materials Research Group.

== Education and career ==
Liu received her Ph.D. in 1997 from Xi'an Jiaotong University. She was a postdoctoral researcher at the National Institute of Advanced Industrial Science and Technology in Japan, and at the Australian National University (ANU0, before becoming an academic staff member at ANU.

She is president of the Australia Neutron Beam User's Group (ANBUG), and chair of the Materials Chemistry Division of the Royal Australian Chemical Institute.

== Recognition ==
Liu is a Fellow of the Australian Institute of Physics (FAIP), a Fellow of the Australian Academy of Technological Sciences and Engineering (FSTE), and a Fellow of the Royal Australian Chemical Institute (FRACI). She was elected to the Australian Academy of Science (FAA) in 2026.

She was the 2021 Georgina Sweet Australian Laureate Fellow of the Australian Research Council.
