= Jeffery Errington =

British microbiologist

Jeff Errington FRS, FMedSci is a British microbiologist, and Director of the Centre for Bacterial Cell Biology (CBCB), at Newcastle University.

== Life ==
He was Professor of Microbiology at the University of Oxford and a Fellow of Wadham College, Oxford. He is a fellow of the Royal Society (2003), the Academy of Medical Sciences (2007) and the Australian Academy of Science (2025).

He scientific founder of Demuris. He is a Director at Biota Holdings Ltd.
