= Christine Beveridge =

Australian scientist and plant physiologist

Christine Beveridge FAA
- Born: Christine Anne Beveridge
- Education: University of Tasmania
- Known for: Hormonal control of plant development and shoot architecture
- Scientific career
- Workplaces: University of Queensland
- Thesis: "Assimilate partitioning in sweet pea gigas mutant in garden pea" (1989)

Christine Beveridge FAA is an Australian scientist and plant physiologist whose research focuses on the shoot architecture of plants, shrubs and trees. She is an Australian Research Council Laureate Fellow in the School of Biological Sciences at the University of Queensland, Director of the Australian Research Council Centre of Excellence for Plant Success in Nature and Agriculture, and affiliated professor at the Centre for Crop Science at the Queensland Alliance for Agriculture and Food Innovation.

Beveridge has a BSc and PhD from the University of Tasmania. She was elected Fellow of the Australian Academy of Science in 2015.

In 2018 Beveridge was awarded the ARC Georgina Sweet Laureate Fellowship to research "the genetic mechanisms of shoot branching in agricultural and horticultural plants". In the same year she was elected president of the International Plant Growth Substances Association.

== Selected publications ==
- Beveridge, Christine Anne; Kyozuka, Junko (February 2010). "New genes in the strigolactone-related shoot branching pathway". Current Opinion in Plant Biology. 13 (1): 34–39. Bibcode:2010COPB...13...34B. doi:10.1016/j.pbi.2009.10.003. PMID 19913454.
- Barbier, Francois F.; Dun, Elizabeth A.; Kerr, Stephanie C.; Chabikwa, Tinashe G.; Beveridge, Christine A. (March 2019). "An Update on the Signals Controlling Shoot Branching". Trends in Plant Science. 24 (3): 220–236. Bibcode:2019TPS....24..220B. doi:10.1016/j.tplants.2018.12.001. PMID 30797425. S2CID 73475224.
- Carvalhais, Lilia C.; Rincon-Florez, Vivian A.; Brewer, Philip B.; Beveridge, Christine A.; Dennis, Paul G.; Schenk, Peer M. (March 2019). "The ability of plants to produce strigolactones affects rhizosphere community composition of fungi but not bacteria". Rhizosphere. 9: 18–26. Bibcode:2019Rhizo...9...18C. doi:10.1016/j.rhisph.2018.10.002. S2CID 91287127.
- Chesterfield, Rebecca J.; Vickers, Claudia E.; Beveridge, Christine A. (July 2020). "Translation of Strigolactones from Plant Hormone to Agriculture: Achievements, Future Perspectives, and Challenges". Trends in Plant Science. 25 (11): 1087–1106. Bibcode:2020TPS....25.1087C. doi:10.1016/j.tplants.2020.06.005. hdl:10072/416494. PMID 32660772. S2CID 220521454.
