= Katherine Demuth =

American linguist & academic

- Education: University of New Mexico; Indiana University
- Occupation: Linguist
- Awards: Fellow of the Royal Society of New South Wales (2017); Fellow of the Academy of the Social Sciences in Australia (2015); Australian Laureate Fellowship (2013)
- Scientific career
- Workplaces: Macquarie University; Brown University
- Website: researchers.mq.edu.au/en/persons/eb6e864a-fdc6-4018-a1d3-bbb796330f1d

Katherine Demuth is an American professor of linguistics and the director of the Child Language Lab at Macquarie University. She was elected a Fellow of the Royal Society of New South Wales in February 2018, and is a Fellow of the Academy of Social Sciences in Australia (FSSA).

== Education and career ==
She earned a BA from University of New Mexico, and an MA and Ph.D. from Indiana University Bloomington.

Her early works included work on Bantu languages. At Macquarie University's Child Language Laboratory she and her team study language acquisition and development in children (including the hearing impaired, Mandarin-speaking children, those with mothers suffering depression, and indigenous children) and continue her work on child language acquisition from Brown University.
