= Leann Tilley =

Australian biochemist and microbiologist

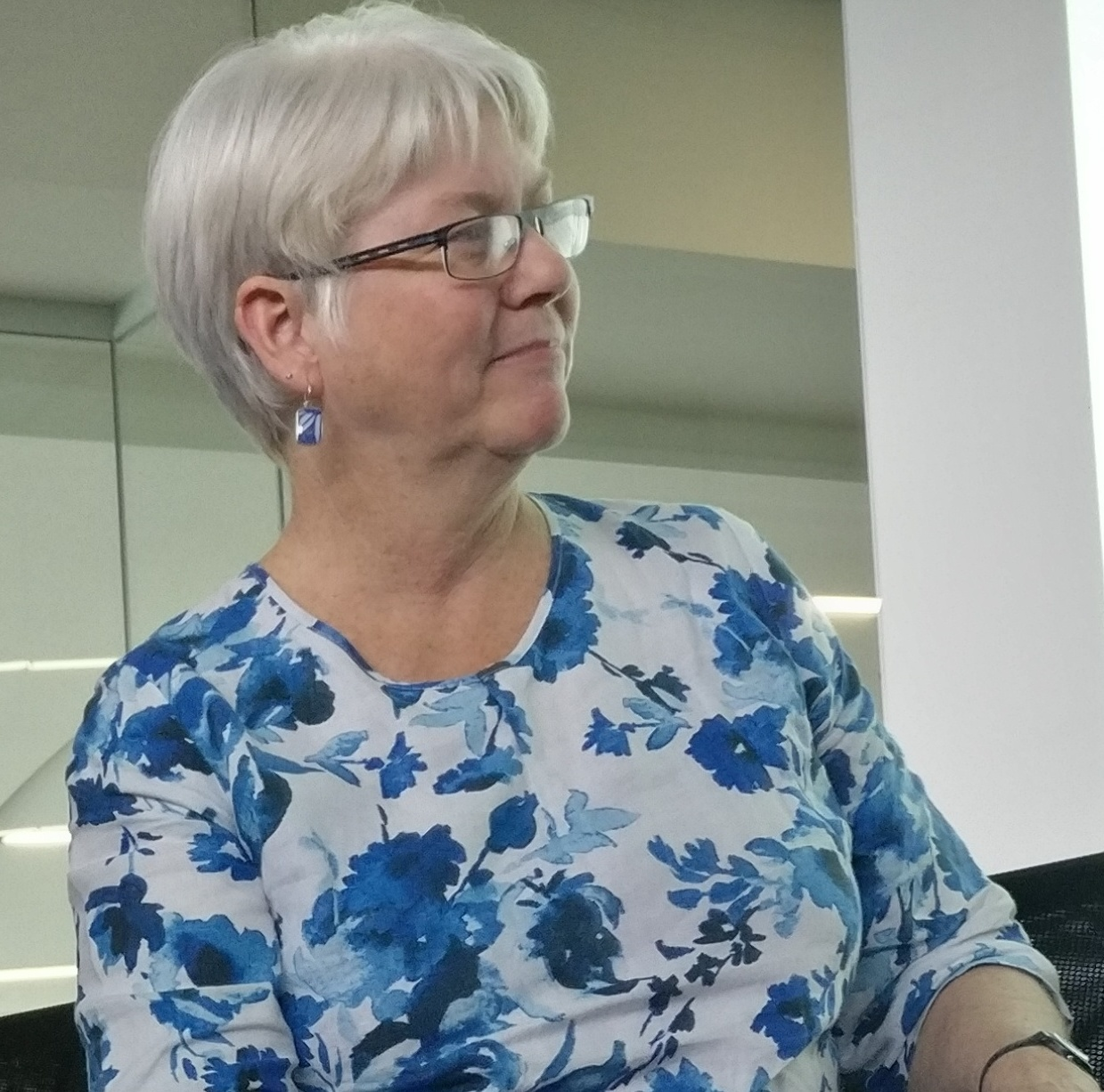
- May 2019 in Heidelberg
- Born: Edenhope, Victoria
- Education: University of Melbourne, University of Sydney
- Awards: 2010 Bancroft-Mackerras Medal from the Australian Society for Parasitology; Beckman Coulter Discovery Award of the Australian Society for Biochemistry and Molecular Biology; 2015 Georgina Sweet Fellowship; 2016 Eureka Award for Infectious Diseases Research; 2017 Bob Robertson Award of the Australian Society for Biophysics
- Scientific career
- Fields: Parasitology, biochemistry
- Workplaces: University of Melbourne

Leann Tilley is Professor of Biochemistry and Molecular Biology in the Bio21 Molecular Science and Biotechnology Institute, The University of Melbourne.

== Education and awards ==
Leann Tilley was born in Edenhope, Victoria, and attended Marian College in Ararat. Following a BSc (hons) in biochemistry at the University of Melbourne, she obtained her PhD in biochemistry from the University of Sydney. She completed postdoctoral fellowships at Utrecht University in the Netherlands, the College de France in Paris, and the University of Melbourne, before joining La Trobe University. In 2011 she moved to the Department of Biochemistry and Molecular Biology at the University of Melbourne.

Professor Tilley was awarded an Australian Research Council Georgina Sweet Australian Laureate Fellowship (2016-2020) to measure and model malaria parasites. This includes a role as an ambassador for women in science. Tilley's work has been recognised by the award of the title of Redmond Barry Distinguished Professor, University of Melbourne (2016), an Australian Research Council Australian Professorial Fellowship (2011-2015), the Bancroft-Mackerras Medal from the Australian Society for Parasitology and the Beckman Coulter Discovery Award of the Australian Society for Biochemistry and Molecular Biology. Her team was awarded the 2016 Eureka Award for Infectious Diseases Research. She was awarded the Bob Robertson Award of the Australian Society for Biophysics in 2017 and the Lemberg Medal by the Australian Society for Biochemistry and Molecular Biology in 2022.

== Research ==
Tilley's research focuses on the use of molecular approaches and imaging techniques to study the malaria parasite and its interactions with its host in an effort to develop novel therapies. Her scientific contributions have been in four main areas: 1) Establishing Imaging Facilities and Technologies. For example, Tilley has pioneered the application of methods such as Super-Resolution Optical Microscopy to studies of the malaria parasite. 2) Antimalarial Drug Action. For example, Tilley investigates the molecular basis of the resistance that is currently emerging to the antimalarial drug, artemisinin, with a view to extending the use of a drug that saves millions of lives, 3) Studying the unusual trafficking path that brings P. falciparum virulence proteins to the host red blood cell surface, and 4) Determining the molecular basis of the amazing shape-changing properties of the sexual stage gametocyte.

She served as Deputy Director (2005-2012) and Director (2013-2014) of the Australian Research Council Centre of Excellence for Coherent X-ray Science (CXS).
