= Branka Vucetic =

Wireless engineering researcher

Branka Vucetic FAA
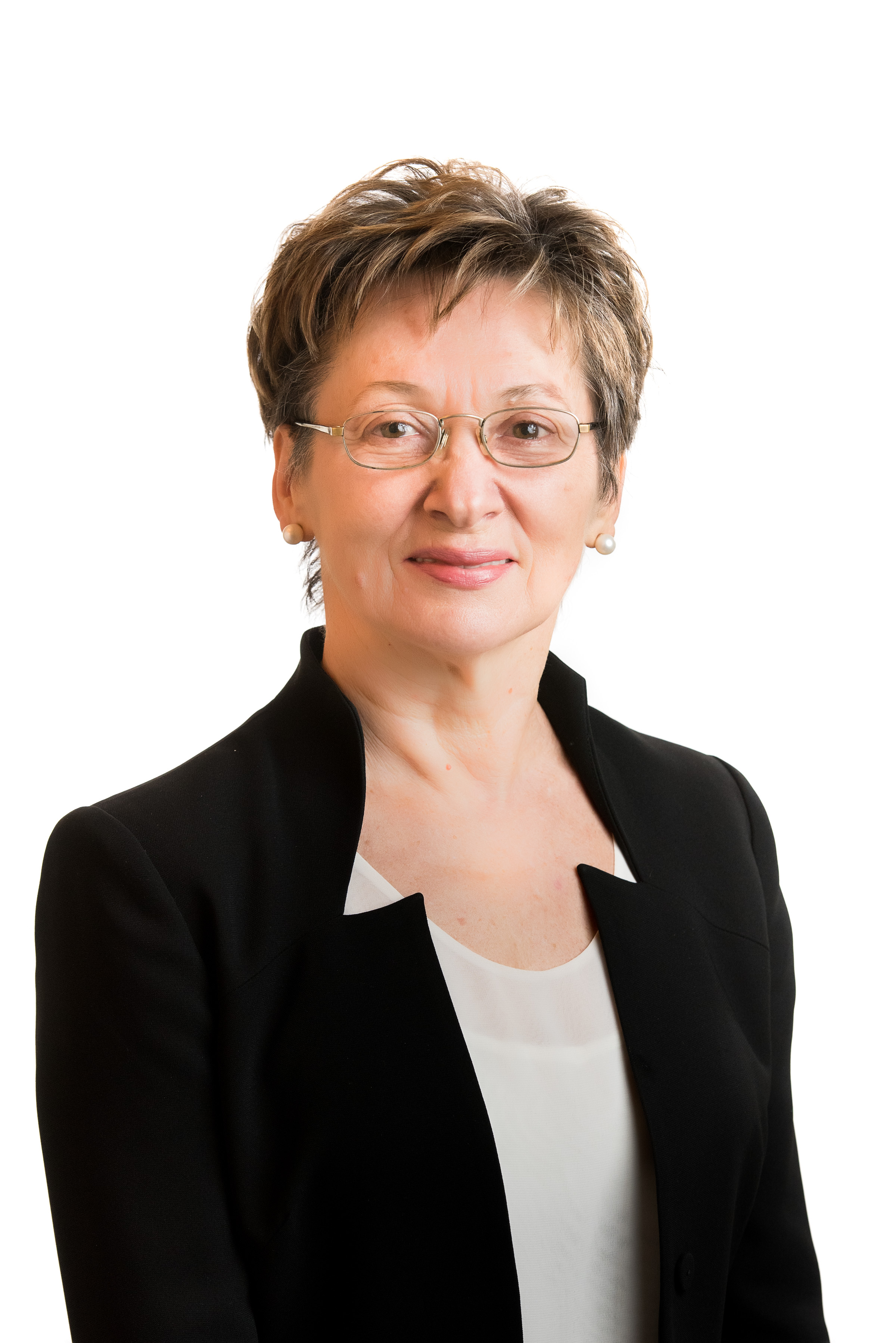
- Vucetic in 2017
- Born: Belgrade, Serbia
- Education: University of Belgrade
- Awards: Georgina Sweet Fellowship (2016)
- Scientific career
- Fields: Coding theory, Internet of things
- Workplaces: University of Sydney (1986–present)

Professor Branka Vucetic FAA is an Australian-based expert in coding theory and its applications in wireless technology. She works at the University of Sydney where she holds the positions of ARC Laureate Fellow, Peter Nicol Russell Chair in Telecommunications, and Director of the Centre of Excellence in Telecommunications.

== Biography ==
Vucetic grew up in Belgrade, Serbia, with her parents, a school teacher and a shop assistant. "Her fascination with physics and wireless engineering stems from being challenged by a high-school teacher to answer a complicated question on electromagnetic waves. Further stimulated by library research, she formed the ambition to inspire the next generation of female students to pursue engineering, technology, science or maths".

She obtained her tertiary qualifications from the University of Belgrade: Bachelor of Science in Electrical Engineering (1972), Master of Science (1978) and Doctor of Philosophy in Telecommunications (1982). Vucetic has held academic positions in Serbia, United Kingdom, Australia and China. She is Fellow of the IEEE (Institute of Electrical and Electronics Engineers) for contributions to the theory and applications of channel coding, a former Editor of the IEEE Transactions on Communications, a Fellow of the Australian Academy of Science, and a Fellow of the Australian Academy of Technological Sciences and Engineering.

== Work ==
Vucetic's current work is in the area of wireless networks and the internet of things. In the area of wireless networks she explores the possibilities of millimetre wave (mmWave) frequency bands. Considering that microwave bands below 6 GHz have already been heavily used, she and her team are exploring opportunities afforded by the mmWave frequency band. They believe that use of the unused spectrum between 30 GHz and 300 GHz will be the foundation of the next revolution in wireless communication. Vucetic "is working with her team on developing a fundamental theoretical framework and advanced signal processing and network protocols for mmWave systems".

In the area of the internet of things, Vucetic works on extending wireless connectivity for mission critical applications such as "automated power grids, information exchange between vehicles and supporting cloud infrastructure for detecting safety-critical situations, such as black ice, vehicle accident minimisation and adaptation to road conditions, remotely controlled and self-driven vehicles and remote robot-assisted surgeries". She is also investigating mechanisms for delivering power to devices by using micro and mmWave radiation, which would considerably extend battery life without a need for power cables and chargers.

Vucetic has published hundreds of journal articles and four books.

== Awards and honours ==
- 2014 – Chinese Government Friendship Award
- 2015 – Fellow of the Australian Academy of Technological Sciences and Engineering
- 2016 – ARC Georgina Sweet Australian Laureate Fellowship
- 2017 – Fellow of the Australian Academy of Science
- 2018 – New South Wales Premier's Prize for Science and Engineering
- 2019 – CSIRO Eureka Prize for Leadership in Innovation and Science, awarded by the Australian Museum

== See also ==
- Mobile technology
- Wireless network
- Wireless
