= Federation Fellowship =

Federation Fellowships are Australian professorial research fellowships that were instigated by the Australian Government as part of its Backing Australia's Ability initiative. They were initially designed to compete with prestigious overseas grants in an attempt to lure back high-profile Australian researchers from foreign institutions. The first round of Fellowships in 2001 were awarded to 15 researchers, 6 of whom were working overseas at the time.

New funding to the scheme ceased in 2008, with existing fellowships continuing as before. It was replaced by the Australian Laureate Fellowships.

== 2001 Fellowships ==
There were nn applications, 15 recommendations and 14 acceptances.

- Professor Robert Clark
- Professor Max Coltheart
- Professor Michael Dopita
- Professor Huw Price
- Professor Lenore Manderson
- Professor Martin Green
- Professor Graham Goodwin
- Professor Mandavarn Srinivasan
- Professor Keith Nugent
- Professor Yiu-wing Mai
- Professor Gottfried Otting
- Dr Frank Caruso
- Professor John Braithwaite
- Dr Benjamin Eggleton

== 2002 Fellowships ==
There were 87 applications, 11 recommendations and nn acceptances.

- Professor Max Coltheart
- Professor Hugh Durrant-Whyte
- Professor Ronald Ekers
- Professor Terence Hughes
- Professor Graeme Hugo
- Professor Yuri Kivshar
- Professor Trevor Lamb
- Dr Catherine Stampfl
- Professor David Trimm
- Professor Rodney Tucker
- Dr Simon Turner
- Professor Mark von Itzstein

== 2003 Fellowships ==
There were 97 applications, 24 recommendations.

- Professor Hans Bachor
- Professor Perry Bartlett
- Professor Marcela Bilek
- Professor Kevin Burrage
- Dr Calum Drummond
- Dr William Ducker
- Dr Roger Francey
- Professor Andrew Holmes
- Professor Martin Johnson
- Professor Bruce Kemp
- Professor Max Lu
- Professor Barry Luther-Davies
- Professor Amanda Lynch
- Dr Richard Manchester
- Professor Thomas Maschmeyer
- Professor Iain McCalman
- Dr Anton Middelberg
- Professor Gerard Milburn
- Professor John Quiggin
- Professor Marilyn Renfree
- Professor Peter Robinson
- Professor Jeffrey Shaw
- Associate Professor Michelle Simmons
- Dr Mark Tester

== 2004 Fellowships ==
There were 143 applications, 25 recommendations and nn acceptances.

- Professor Mark Bradford
- Professor Richard Brent
- Associate Professor Ashley Bush
- Professor David Chalmers
- Professor Alan Cooper
- Professor Stephen Crain
- Professor Simon Grant
- Professor Paul Griffiths
- Professor David Hill
- Professor Peter Hodgson
- Professor Ary Hoffman
- Professor Stephen Hyde
- Professor Chennupati Jagadish
- Professor Alan Mark
- Professor Michael Nielsen
- Professor Philip Pettit
- Professor Leigh Simmons
- Professor Stephen Simpson
- Professor Scott Sloan
- Professor Steven M Smith
- Professor Mathias Trau
- Dr Jill Trewhella
- Associate Professor Howard Wiseman
- Associate Professor Rachel Wong
- Professor Bernard Wood

== 2005 Fellowships ==
163 proposals and 25 were approved for funding.

== 2006 Fellowships ==
- Dr P Burn
- Prof DJ Karoly
- Prof BF Kiernan
- Dr LR Marshall
- Prof I Marusic
- A/Prof DM Studdert
- Dr TS Shippenberg
- Prof PR Van Hentenryck
- Prof J Braithwaite*
- Prof MC Burry
- Prof DP Fairlie
- Prof CC Goodnow
- Prof MA Green*
- Prof PR Haddad
- Prof PG Hall
- Prof TP Hughes*
- Prof TC Lindsey
- Prof GI McFadden
- Prof KA Nugent*
- Prof MW Parker
- Prof HP Possingham
- Dr J Rossjohn
- Prof G Turner
- Prof G Vidal
- Prof GG Wallace
- Prof AG White

Selection Bios

== 2007 Fellowships ==
Selection Bios

== 2008 Fellowships ==
Selection Bios
