= Belinda Medlyn =

Academic and ecosystem modeller

Belinda Medlyn FAA is a plant physiologist, ecologist and mathematical modeller. Her research explores how plants, and particularly trees, respond to increases in atmospheric carbon dioxide.

== Education and career ==
Belinda Medlyn started her career working in a merchant bank after completing an Honours degree in Applied Mathematics at the University of Adelaide. However, she has said that the work did not suit her. She heard of mathematical ecology from Hugh Possingham and returned to study a PhD in theoretical biology from University of NSW. Since 2015, Medlyn has worked at the Hawkesbury Institute for the Environment at Western Sydney University.

Medlyn's work combines experimental ecology with mathematical modelling to develop evidence-based models that predict how plants will respond to rising carbon dioxide levels, increasing temperatures and drought, and so how species composition and ecosystem productivity will be affected by climate change.

Her research on stomatal conductance, the process that governs how plants use water and take up carbon, drew together theoretical and experimental approaches into a unified stomatal model.

Through her research at the Eucalyptus Free-Air CO_{2} Enrichment (EucFACE) experiment - "The world’s only Free-Air Carbon Dioxide Enrichment experiment in a mature, warm temperate forest ecosystem" - her team has identified that, in contrast to most trees which are growing faster due to increased atmospheric CO_{2}, Australian eucalypts are not. This appears to be due to soil microbes using the phosphorus they produce to aid their own metabolism rather than releasing it to be used in photosynthesis and so tree growth.

In 2019, Medlyn started the Dead Tree Detective project, a citizen science initiative that aims "to collect observations of dead or dying trees around Australia". By collecting information on times and locations of tree deaths, scientists will be able to understand the cause of death, and so identify and protect vulnerable trees.

== Awards ==
- Fellow of the Australia Academy of Science (2023)
- Fellow of the Royal Society of NSW (2020)
- ARC Georgina Sweet Laureate Fellowship (2019)
