= Adrienne Stone =

Australian legal academic

Adrienne Stone FAAL FASSA is an Australian legal academic specialising in the areas of constitutional law and constitutional theory, with particular expertise in freedom of expression.

== Academic career ==
As of 2024, Stone is Melbourne Laureate Professor at the University of Melbourne. She holds a Chair at Melbourne Law School, and is a director at the school's Centre for Comparative Constitutional Studies.

Additionally, she is President Emeritus of the International Association of Constitutional Law, and is an elected Fellow of the Academy of Social Sciences in Australia and the Australian Academy of Law.

== Personal life ==
Stone is one of seven grandchildren of legal scholar Julius Stone. She is married to Justice Graeme Hill, a judge of the Federal Court of Australia.

== Selected publications ==
- Open Minds: Academic Freedom and Freedom of Speech (2020)
- Oxford Handbook on the Australian Constitution (2018) - Editor
