= Australian and New Zealand Society of International Law =

The Australian and New Zealand Society of International Law ("ANZSIL") is a society founded in 1992 for legal academics, practitioners, government employees, and students with a practice or interest in international law.

== Organization and governance ==
ANZSIL is hosted by The Australian National University's Centre for International and Public Law and the Victoria University of Wellington's New Zealand Centre for Public Law.

The current President of ANZSIL is Alison Duxbury.
