= Australian Research Council =

Australian governmental non-medical research funding agency, formed in 2001

Council overview
- Formed: 2001; 25 years ago
- Jurisdiction: Australian Government
- Headquarters: Canberra
- Employees: 140
- Annual budget: ▲ A$934.6 million (2023–24)^{,} (Note: This value represents the funding allocated to the ARC for the purposes of research grants, and does not include the operational budget of the agency.)
- Minister responsible: Jason Clare, Minister for Education
- Council executive: Professor Ute Roessner, CEO
- Key document: Australian Research Council Act 2001
- Website: arc.gov.au

The Australian Research Council (ARC) is a Commonwealth entity established as an independent body under the Australian Research Council Act 2001, reporting to the Minister for Education.

The ARC's purpose is to help shape Australian research for the nation's economic, social, environmental and cultural benefit:

1. enabling research,
2. evaluating the excellence, impact and depth of Australian research,
3. providing advice and research grants services, and
4. supporting research integrity and promoting ethical research.

The ARC supports early-stage research through the National Competitive Grants Program (NCGP), which supports approximately $1 billion per year of research to individuals, teams and large-scale centres in all disciplines except for medical.

Since 2011, ARC has awarded the annual Kathleen Fitzpatrick Australian Laureate Fellowship and the Georgina Sweet Australian Laureate Fellowship, which are research fellowships for female Australian and international researchers, intended to support innovative research programs and mentor early career researchers.

== History and governance ==
The ARC was founded in 2001 under the Australian Research Council Act 2001 It is directly descended from the 1965 Australian Research Grants Committee. As of 2025, the agency reports to the Minister for Education.

=== Research integrity ===
Management of research integrity in Australia is a shared responsibility that involves the Australian Research Council (ARC), the National Health and Medical Research Council (NHMRC) and a range of other institutions and entities.

There is no single Commonwealth agency with regulatory powers for the management or oversight of research integrity in Australia. Responsibility for the various aspects of research integrity is shared among institutions that conduct research, funding agencies, agencies such as Ombudsman Offices in the jurisdictions, Crime and Corruption Commissions in jurisdictions and the Tertiary Education Quality and Standards Agency (TEQSA).

== Functional areas ==
=== National Competitive Grants Program ===
The ARC funds research and researchers under the National Competitive Grants Program (NCGP). Funding opportunities administered by the ARC include the Australian Laureate Fellowship.

On 25 February 2025, the ARC released the Discussion Paper: A New Plan for ARC-Funded Research, proposing major reforms to the National Competitive Grants Program (NCGP). Developed following extensive 2024 consultations, the paper outlines a redesigned scheme structure, streamlined processes, stronger support for early career researchers, and a greater focus on knowledge generation and collaboration. The review aims to ensure the NCGP remains innovative, aligned with national research priorities, and delivers clear public value. Submissions are now closed, with a final report due in Q3 2025.

=== Research Insights Capability ===
The ARC is developing a new approach research evaluation, designed to be a useful tool to build understanding, recognise excellent Australian research and celebrate its outstanding achievements. It's being referred to as the ARC's Research Insights Capability.

== Gender equity ==
The ARC has awarded research fellowships for female Australian and international researchers and research leaders to build Australia's research capacity, undertake innovative research programs and mentor early career researchers since 2011. The Kathleen Fitzpatrick Australian Laureate Fellowship is awarded to a candidate from the humanities, arts and social science disciplines, and the Georgina Sweet Australian Laureate Fellowship is awarded to a candidate from the science and technology disciplines.

Year	Kathleen Fitzpatrick Fellow	Georgina Sweet Fellow
2011	Pippa Norris	Mahananda Dasgupta
2012	Susan O'Connor	Nalini Joshi
2013	Glenda Sluga	Tanya Monro
2014	Joy Damousi	Veena Sahajwalla, Kate Smith-Miles
2015	Anne Orford	Leann Tilley
2016	Adrienne Stone, Sharon Parker	Branka Vucetic
2017	Ann McGrath	Michelle Coote
2018	Marilyn Fleer	Christine Beveridge
2019	Lynette Russell	Belinda Medlyn
2020	Maureen Dollard	Catherine Lovelock
2021	Sundhya Pahuja	Yun Liu
2022	Larissa Behrendt	Joanne Etheridge
2023	Janeen Baxter	Catherine Stampfl
2024	Jacqueline Peel	Hongxia Wang
2025	Felicity Meakins	Anya Reading

== See also ==
- National Health and Medical Research Council
- Commonwealth Scientific and Industrial Research Organisation (CSIRO)
- Australian Competitive Grants Register
