= Catherine Stampfl =

Theoretical condensed matter physicist

Catherine Stampfl FAA FRSN
- Born: Catherine Margaret Stampfl
- Education: La Trobe University
- Scientific career
- Fields: Physics
- Workplaces: Xerox Palo Alto Research Center; Fritz Haber Institute of the Max Planck Society; Northwestern University; University of Sydney
- Thesis: A one-step model of photoemission based on a multi-slice LEED formalism (1990)

Catherine Margaret Stampfl is a professor of physics at the University of Sydney and was elected as a Fellow of the Australian Academy of Science in 2019.

== Career ==
Stampfl received a PhD in physics from La Trobe University in 1990. She then moved to the United States where she worked at the Xerox Palo Alto Research Center and the Fritz Haber Institute of the Max Planck Society in Germany. Before her return to Australia in 2003 she worked at Northwestern University. She then settled in Sydney and had two children, Eva and Elke.

Stampfl works in interdisciplinary research across physics, engineering, chemistry and materials science. Stampfl has an international reputation for her research on the atomic and electronic structure of solids and nanostructures. She works at the University of Sydney Nano-institute, as a theoretical condensed matter physicist.

Stampfl works to predict new catalysts and new materials including those that could convert carbon dioxide into other fuels, as well as researching chemical reactions at surfaces.

Her work involves high-performance computing and first-principles calculations to develop an understanding of how matter behaves. She also works to predict new and improved materials for enhanced technology.

Of her work, she remarks "we are a bit like explorers. We try new things and we see what the calculated properties are... sometimes you will find something that has high potential".

She is noted as a woman "in theoretical/computational chemistry, material science, and biochemistry".

== Select publications ==
- C Stampfl, CG Van de Walle (1999) Density-functional calculations for III-V nitrides using the local-density approximation and the generalized gradient approximation Physical Review B:59(8),5521.
- C Stampfl, W Mannstadt, R Asahi, AJ (2001) Freeman Electronic structure and physical properties of early transition metal mononitrides: Density-functional theory LDA, GGA, and screened-exchange LDA FLAPW calculations. Physical Review B:63(15)155106
- M Bonn, S Funk, C Hess, DN Denzler, C Stampfl, et al. (1999) Phonon-versus electron-mediated desorption and oxidation of CO on Ru (0001)
- Science 285 (5430), 1042–1045.
- C Stampfl, CG Van de Walle (1998) Energetics and electronic structure of stacking faults in AlN, GaN, and InN. Physical Review B 57 (24), R15052

Stampfl has an H-index of 50, and over 9,200 citations as at September 2019.

== Awards, honours and recognition ==
- 2023 — Georgina Sweet Australian Laureate Fellowship
- 2021 — Fellow of the Royal Society of New South Wales
- 2019 — Fellow of the Australian Academy of Science
- 2018 — Deputy Champion of the team Nanotechnology for Carbon-Neutral Manufacturing, in the Sydney Nano Grand Challenge
- 2003 — ARC Federation Fellow at the University of Sydney
