= Eureka Prizes =

Annual prizes awarded by the Australian Museum

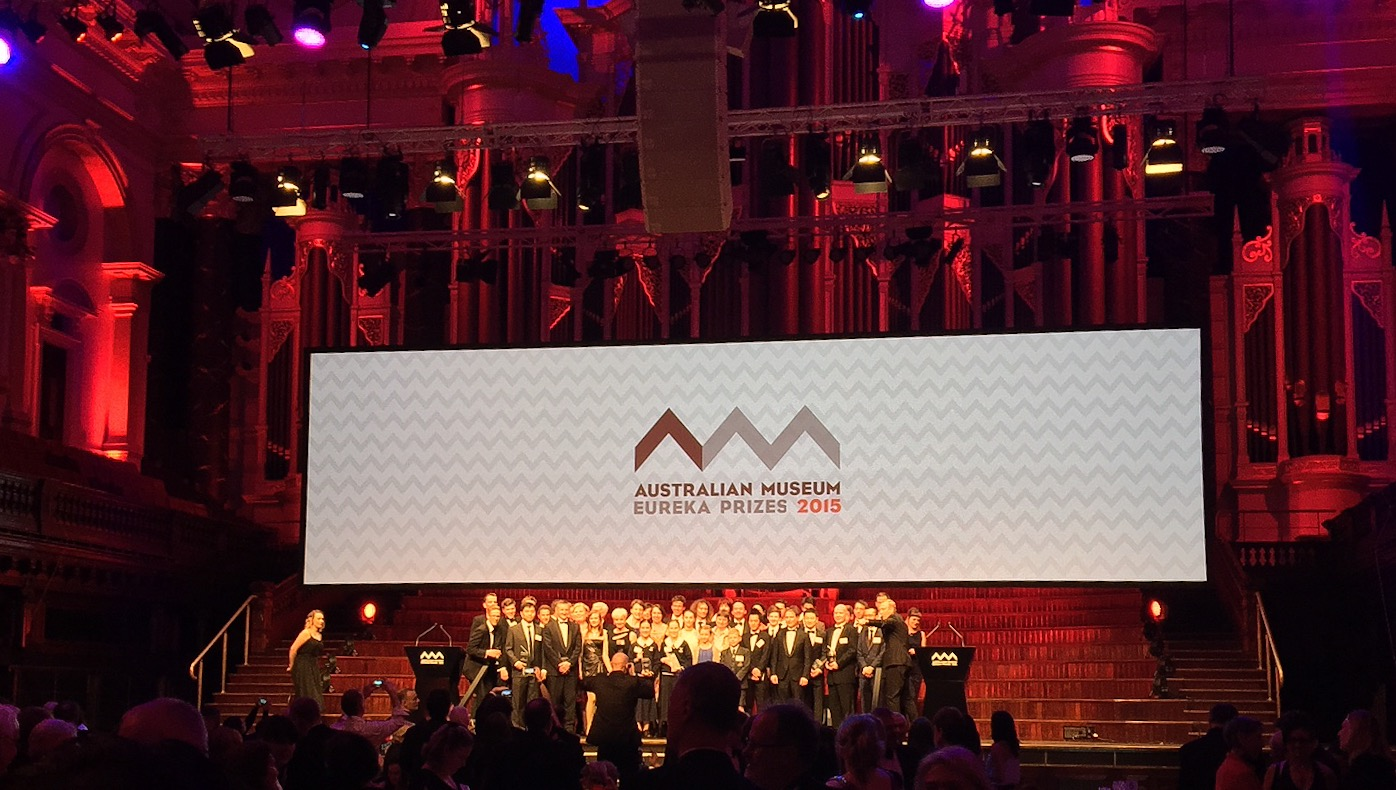
The winners of the 2015 Australian Museum Eureka Prizes together on stage at the Sydney Town Hall

The Eureka Prizes are awarded annually by the Australian Museum, Sydney, to recognise individuals and organisations who have contributed to science and the understanding of science in Australia. They were founded in 1990 following a suggestion by science journalist Robyn Williams.

As of 2024, there are 19 prizes awarded across four categories and a total of $A$180,000 in prize money. The four categories are Research and Innovation, School Science, Science Engagement and Leadership.

== Winners ==
=== 2026 ===
Winner	Affiliation	Prize	Refs
Marine Heatwave Forecasts	CSIRO and Bureau of Meteorology	NSW Department of Climate Change, Energy, the Environment and Water Eureka Prize for Environmental Research	
Professor Helen Paterson	University of Sydney	University of Technology Sydney and Australian Federal Police Eureka Prize for Excellence in Forensic Science	
Professor Ivan Kassal and Associate Professor Ting Rei Tan	University of Sydney	Eureka Prize for Excellence in Interdisciplinary Scientific Research	
EcoCommons Australia	QCIF Digital Research	Australian Research Data Commons Eureka Prize for Excellence in Data Platforms	
Women's Microbiome Innovation Group	Melbourne Sexual Health Centre; Monash University; and Alfred Health	Australian Infectious Diseases Research Centre Eureka Prize for Infectious Diseases Research	
C2X	RMIT University	Eureka Prize for Innovative Use of Technology	
Dr Aidan Cashin	UNSW and Neuroscience Research Australia	Macquarie University Eureka Prize for Outstanding Early Career Researcher	
Professor Vincent Gramoli	University of Sydney and Redbelly Network	Department of Defence Eureka Prize for Outstanding Science in Safeguarding Australia	
Professor Georgina Long	University of Sydney and Melanoma Institute Australia	UNSW Eureka Prize for Scientific Research	
Professor Yansong Shen	UNSW	Eureka Prize for Sustainability Research	
Dr Jane Tiller	Monash University	University of Sydney Eureka Prize for Emerging Leader in Science, Technology and Engineering	
Distinguished Professor Maree Teesson	University of Sydney	University of Sydney Eureka Prize for Leadership in Science	
Associate Professor Karen Lamb	University of Melbourne	University of Technology Sydney Eureka Prize for Outstanding Mentor of Researchers	
Miyawaki Forest Program	Murdoch University	Department of Industry, Science and Resources Eureka Prize for Innovation in Citizen Science	
Dr Lila Landowski	University of Tasmania and Science and Technology Australia	Celestino Eureka Prize for Promoting Understanding of Science	
Liam Mannix and William Davis	The Age and Brisbane Times	Australian Museum Eureka Prize for Science Journalism	
OurFutures Vaping Program	Matilda Centre for Research in Mental Health and Substance Use, University of Sydney; University of Queensland; Curtin University; Monash University; UNSW; and University of Newcastle	UNSW Eureka Prize for Societal Impact in Science	
Science Gallery Melbourne	University of Melbourne	Department of Industry, Science and Resources Eureka Prize for STEM Inclusion	
Poppy H.	Homeschool Perth, WA	Australian Museum School Science Eureka Prize – Primary	
Millie B.	Karrinyup, WA	Australian Museum School Science Eureka Prize – Secondary	

=== 2025 ===
Winner	Affiliation	Prize	Refs
Living Seawalls	Macquarie University; UNSW; and Sydney Institute of Marine Science	2025 Eureka Prize for Environmental Research	
Towards a Smart PCR Process	Flinders University and Forensic Science SA	University of Technology Sydney and Australian Federal Police Eureka Prize for Excellence in Forensic Science	
Octopus and Ice Sheet Team	James Cook University; CSIRO; and Antarctic Research Centre	2025 Aspire Scholarship Eureka Prize for Excellence in Interdisciplinary Scientific Research	
dartR	University of Canberra	2025 Australian Research Data Commons Eureka Prize for Excellence in Research Software	
Vaccines and Infectious Diseases Group	University of Adelaide; SA Pathology; Department for Health and Wellbeing, SA Health; Women's and Children's Hospital; and Northern Territory Health	2025 Australian Infectious Diseases Research Centre Eureka Prize for Infectious Diseases Research	
The Fission Chips Team	Macquarie University	2025 ANSTO Eureka Prize for Innovative Use of Technology	
Hasindu Gamaarachchi	UNSW and Garvan Institute of Medical Research	2025 Macquarie University Eureka Prize for Outstanding Early Career Researcher	
Kamal Kant Gupta and Jafar Shojaii	Department of Defence, Macquarie University), University of Melbourne, Swinburne University of Technology	2025 Department of Defence Eureka Prize for Outstanding Science in Safeguarding Australia	
PINK1 Parkinson’s Disease Research Team	WEHI	2025 UNSW Eureka Prize for Scientific Research	
Anita-Ho Baillie	University of Sydney	2025 University of Sydney Eureka Prize for Sustainability Research	
Aaron Eger	UNSW and Kelp Forest Alliance	2025 Eureka Prize for Emerging Leader in Science	
Ian Paulsen	Macquarie University	2025 Eureka Prize for Leadership in Science	
Michael Milford	Queensland University of Technology	2025 University of Technology Sydney Eureka Prize for Outstanding Mentor of Researchers	
Passport2Recovery	Flinders University	2025 Department of Industry, Science and Resources Eureka Prize for Innovation in Citizen Science	
Vanessa Pirotta	Macquarie University	2025 Celestino Eureka Prize for Promoting Understanding of Science	
Tyne Logan and Ashley Kyd	Australian Broadcasting Corporation	2025 Australian Museum Eureka Prize for Science Journalism	
Thomas Maschmeyer	University of Sydney	2025 UNSW Eureka Prize for Societal Impact in Science	
Science and Engineering Challenge	University of Newcastle	2025 Department of Industry, Science and Resources Eureka Prize for STEM Inclusion	
Keira P.	PLC Sydney, NSW	2025 University of Sydney Sleek Geeks Science Eureka Prize - Primary	
Sophie M.,	St Philip's Christian College, NSW	2025 University of Sydney Sleek Geeks Science Eureka Prize - Secondary	

=== 2024 ===
Winner	Affiliation	Prize	Refs
Sensory Conservation Team	University of Sydney	2024 Eureka Prize for Environmental Research	
David Keith	UNSW	2024 Australian Institute of Botanical Science Eureka Prize for Excellence in Botanical Science	
ACRF Australian Centre of Excellence in Melanoma Imaging and Diagnosis	University of Queensland	2024 Aspire Scholarship Eureka Prize for Excellence in Interdisciplinary Scientific Research	
Gordon Smyth	WEHI	2024 Australian Research Data Commons Eureka Prize for Excellence in Research Software	
StrepA Outbreak Prevention Team	University of Queensland; University of Melbourne; CONACYT; and University of Wollongong	2024 Australian Infectious Diseases Research Centre Eureka Prize for Infectious Diseases Research	
Aaron McFadyen	Queensland University of Technology	2024 ANSTO Eureka Prize for Innovative Use of Technology	
Mengyu Li	University of Sydney	2024 Macquarie University Eureka Prize for Outstanding Early Career Researcher	
Bluelink Global Ocean Science Team	Bureau of Meteorology and CSIRO	2024 Department of Defence Eureka Prize for Outstanding Science in Safeguarding Australia	
Stuart Tangye	Garvan Institute of Medical Research	2024 UNSW Eureka Prize for Scientific Research	
Sustainable Omega-3 Oil	CSIRO and Nuseed	2024 University of Sydney Eureka Prize for Sustainability Research	
Jiao Jiao Li	University of Technology Sydney	2024 Eureka Prize for Emerging Leader in Science	
Calum Drummond	RMIT University	2024 Eureka Prize for Leadership in Science	
Kate Jolliffe	University of Sydney	2024 University of Technology Sydney Eureka Prize for Outstanding Mentor of Researchers	
Insect Investigators		2024 Department of Industry, Science and Resources Eureka Prize for Innovation in Citizen Science	
Euan Ritchie	Deakin University	2024 Celestino Eureka Prize for Promoting Understanding of Science	
Hello AI Overlords	Australian Broadcasting Corporation	2024 Australian Museum Eureka Prize for Science Journalism	
Wonder of Science	University of Queensland	2024 Department of Industry, Science and Resources Eureka Prize for STEM Inclusion	
Cate Y.	PLC Sydney, NSW	2024 University of Sydney Sleek Geeks Science Eureka Prize - Primary	
Iestyn R.	St John’s Anglican College, Qld	2024 University of Sydney Sleek Geeks Science Eureka Prize - Secondary	

=== 2023 ===
Winner	Affiliation	Prize	Refs
Waterbirds Aerial Survey Team	University of NSW and the New South Wales Department of Planning and Environment	2023 NSW Environment and Heritage Eureka Prize for Applied Environmental Research	
Noushka Reiter	Royal Botanic Gardens Victoria	2023 Australian Institute of Botanical Science Eureka Prize for Excellence in Botanical Science	
Cystic Fibrosis Lung Health Imaging	University of Adelaide, Women's and Children's Hospital, Adelaide, 4D Medical Pty Ltd and Monash University	2023 Eureka Prize for Excellence in Interdisciplinary Scientific Research	
Minh Bui and Robert Lanfear	Australian National University	2023 Australian Research Data Commons Eureka Prize for Excellence in Research Software	
The Corona Queens	University of Melbourne and Peter Doherty Institute for Infection and Immunity	2023 Australian Infectious Diseases Research Centre Eureka Prize for Infectious Diseases Research	
Economic Fairways Mapper Team	Monash University and Geoscience Australia	2023 University of Sydney Eureka Prize for Innovative Research in Sustainability	
IMAGENDO	University of Adelaide and OMNI Ultrasound and Gynaecological Care	2023 ANSTO Eureka Prize for Innovative Use of Technology	
Fengwang Li	University of Sydney	2023 Macquarie University Eureka Prize for Outstanding Early Career Researcher	
MetaSteerers Team	University of Technology Sydney, Defence Science and Technology Group and Macquarie University	2023 Department of Defence Eureka Prize for Outstanding Science in Safeguarding Australia	
Tim Thomas and Anne Voss	WEHI	2023 UNSW Eureka Prize for Scientific Research	
Stephanie Partridge	University of Sydney	2023 Eureka Prize for Emerging Leader in Science	
Michael Kassiou	University of Sydney	2023 Department of Defence Eureka Prize for Leadership in Innovation and Science	
Renae Ryan	University of Sydney	2023 University of Technology Sydney Eureka Prize for Outstanding Mentor of Young Researchers	
1 Million Turtles	Western Sydney University, La Trobe University and University of New England	2023 Department of Industry, Science and Resources Eureka Prize for Innovation in Citizen Science	
Toby Walsh	University of New South Wales	2023 Celestino Eureka Prize for Promoting Understanding of Science	
Jo Chandler	Griffith Review	2023 Australian Museum Eureka Prize for Science Journalism	
That's What I Call Science	Volunteer-run radio show and podcast in Tasmania	2023 Department of Industry, Innovation and Science Eureka Prize for STEM Inclusion	
Anna P.	PLC Sydney, NSW	2023 University of Sydney Sleek Geeks Science Eureka Prize - Primary	
Darcy B.	Ashfield Boys High School, NSW	2023 University of Sydney Sleek Geeks Science Eureka Prize - Secondary	

=== 2022 ===
Winner	Affiliation	Prize	Refs
Sustainable Farms	Australian National University	2022 NSW Environment and Heritage Eureka Prize for Applied Environmental Research	
Manfred Lenzen, David Raubenheimer, Arunima Malik, Mengyu Li and Navoda Liyana Pathirana	University of Sydney	2022 Eureka Prize for Excellence in Interdisciplinary Scientific Research	
Eric Chow, Christopher Fairley, Catriona Bradshaw, Jane Hocking, Deborah Williamson and Marcus Chen	Monash University and University of Melbourne	2022 Australian Infectious Diseases Research Centre Eureka Prize for Infectious Diseases Research	
NanoMslide	La Trobe University, University of Melbourne, Garvan Institute of Medical Research and Peter MacCallum Cancer Centre	2022 ANSTO Eureka Prize for Innovative Use of Technology	
Tess Reynolds	University of Sydney	2022 Macquarie University Eureka Prize for Outstanding Early Career Researcher	
Justin Yerbury	University of Wollongong	2022 UNSW Eureka Prize for Scientific Research	
Sumeet Walia	RMIT University	2022 Eureka Prize for Emerging Leader in Science	
Raina MacIntyre	University of New South Wales	2022 Department of Defence Eureka Prize for Leadership in Innovation and Science	
Paul Wood	Monash University	2022 University of Technology Sydney Eureka Prize for Outstanding Mentor of Young Researchers	
The Environment Recovery Project	University of New South Wales and German Centre for Integrative Biodiversity Research	2022 Department of Industry, Science and Resources Eureka Prize for Innovation in Citizen Science	
Veena Sahajwalla	University of New South Wales	2022 Celestino Eureka Prize for Promoting Understanding of Science	
Jackson Ryan	CNET	2022 Australian Museum Eureka Prize for Science Journalism	
Kirsten Ellis	Monash University	2022 Department of Industry, Innovation and Science Eureka Prize for STEM Inclusion	
Genevieve S.	Bucasia State School, QLD	2022 University of Sydney Sleek Geeks Science Eureka Prize - Primary	
Iestyn R.	St John's Anglican College, QLD	2022 University of Sydney Sleek Geeks Science Eureka Prize - Secondary	

=== 2021 ===
Winner	Affiliation	Prize	Refs
NSW Bushfire Hub	University of Wollongong, Western Sydney University, University of Tasmania; and University of NSW	2021 NSW Environment, Energy and Science (DPIE) Eureka Prize for Environmental Research	
Lindell Bromham, Felicity Meakins, Xia Hua and Cassandra Algy	Australian National University, University of Queensland and Karungkarni Art and Culture Aboriginal Corporation	2021 UNSW Eureka Prize for Excellence in Interdisciplinary Scientific Research	
Julie Bines	Murdoch Children's Research Institute and University of Melbourne	2021 Australian Infectious Diseases Research Centre Eureka Prize for Infectious Diseases Research	
Justin Gooding, Maria Kavallaris, Julio Ribeiro, Aidan O'Mahony, Robert Utama and Lakmali Atapattu	University of NSW, Australian Centre for NanoMedicine, Children's Cancer Institute, and Inventia Life Science Pty Ltd	2021 ANSTO Eureka Prize for Innovative Use of Technology	
Emma Camp	University of Technology Sydney	2021 Macquarie University Eureka Prize for Outstanding Early Career Researcher	
Cross Domain Desktop Compositor	University of Melbourne, Defence Science and Technology Group, University of NSW and CSIRO's Data61	2021 Defence Science and Technology Eureka Prize for Outstanding Science in Safeguarding Australia	
Diane McDougald and Gustavo Espinoza Vergara	University of Technology Sydney	2021 UNSW Eureka Prize for Scientific Research	
Kristin Carson-Chahhoud	University of South Australia	2021 3M Eureka Prize for Emerging Leader in Science	
Dana M. Bergstrom	Australian Antarctic Division and University of Wollongong	2021 CSIRO Eureka Prize for Leadership in Innovation and Science	
Melina Georgousakis	Franklin Women	2021 University of Technology Sydney Eureka Prize for Outstanding Mentor of Young Researchers	
Australian Microplastic Assessment Project (AUSMAP)	Total Environment Centre and Macquarie University	2021 Department of Industry, Innovation and Science Eureka Prize for Innovation in Citizen Science	
Dyani Lewis		2021 Finkel Foundation Eureka Prize for Long-Form Science Journalism	
Niraj Lal	Australian National University and Australian Energy Market Operator	2021 Celestino Eureka Prize for Promoting Understanding of Science	
Patient Zero (Olivia Willis, Joel Werner, Cheyne Anderson, James Bullen, Jane Lee, Tim Jenkins, Carl Smith and Nakari Thorpe)	Australian Broadcasting Corporation	2021 Australian Museum Eureka Prize for Science Journalism	
Corey Tutt and Team DeadlyScience		2021 Department of Industry, Innovation and Science Eureka Prize for STEM Inclusion	
Scarlett O. and Scarlett P.	Oak Flats Public School, NSW	2021 University of Sydney Sleek Geeks Science Eureka Prize - Primary	
Jonathan D.	Townsville Grammar School, QLD	2021 University of Sydney Sleek Geeks Science Eureka Prize - Secondary	

=== 2020 ===
Winner	Affiliation	Prize	Refs
Rebuilding Australia's Lost Shellfish Reefs	The Nature Conservancy, James Cook University, University of Adelaide and University of Tasmania	2020 NSW Environment, Energy and Science (DPIE) Eureka Prize for Environmental Research	
Dacheng Tao	University of Sydney	2020 University of Technology Sydney Eureka Prize for Excellence in Data Science	
Social-Ecological Research Frontiers	James Cook University, University of Tasmania, Macquarie University, University of Technology Sydney, Australia Institute of Marine Science, Western Australia Department of Biodiversity, Conservation, and Attractions and The Nature Conservancy	2020 UNSW Eureka Prize for Excellence in Interdisciplinary Scientific Research	
Gregory Dore	Kirby Institute	2020 Australian Infectious Diseases Research Centre Eureka Prize for Infectious Diseases Research	
Monash Pharmaceutical Milkshake Team	Monash University and ANSTO	2020 ANSTO Eureka Prize for Innovative Use of Technology	
Qilin Wang	University of Technology Sydney	2020 Macquarie University Eureka Prize for Outstanding Early Career Researcher	
Benjamin Eggleton, Eric Mägi, Moritz Merklein, Alvaro Casas Bedoya, Yang Liu and Stephen Madden	University of Sydney, Australian National University	2020 Defence Science and Technology Eureka Prize for Outstanding Science in Safeguarding Australia	
Mark Febbraio	Monash University	2020 UNSW Eureka Prize for Scientific Research	
Asha Bowen	Telethon Kids Institute	2020 3M Eureka Prize for Emerging Leader in Science	
Robert F. Park	University of Sydney	2020 CSIRO Eureka Prize for Leadership in Innovation and Science	
Carol Armour	Woolcock Institute of Medical Research, University of Sydney	2020 University of Technology Sydney Eureka Prize for Outstanding Mentor of Young Researchers	
Victorian Coastal Monitoring Program	University of Melbourne, Deakin University, Department of Environment, Land, Water and Planning and Propeller Aerobotics	2020 Department of Industry, Innovation and Science Eureka Prize for Innovation in Citizen Science	
Ceridwen Dovey		2020 Finkel Foundation Eureka Prize for Long-Form Science Journalism	
Alice Motion	University of Sydney	2020 Celestino Eureka Prize for Promoting Understanding of Science	
Tegan Taylor, Norman Swan and Will Ockenden	Australian Broadcasting Corporation	2020 Australian Museum Eureka Prize for Science Journalism	
CSIRO Indigenous STEM Education Project		2020 Department of Industry, Innovation and Science Eureka Prize for STEM Inclusion	
Scarlett P. and Scarlett O.	Oak Flats Primary School, NSW	2020 University of Sydney Sleek Geeks Science Eureka Prize - Primary	
Himalaya J.	Balwyn High School, VIC	2020 University of Sydney Sleek Geeks Science Eureka Prize - Secondary	

=== 2019 ===
Winner	Affiliation	Prize	Refs
Blue Carbon Horizons Team	University of Wollongong, Macquarie University, ANSTO	2019 NSW Environment, Energy and Science (DPIE) Eureka Prize for Environmental Research	
Longbing Cao	University of Technology Sydney	2019 University of Technology Sydney Eureka Prize for Excellence in Data Science	
Endovascular Bionics Laboratory	University of Melbourne, Synchron Inc.	2019 UNSW Eureka Prize for Excellence in Interdisciplinary Scientific Research	
Vivax Malaria Research Team	Walter and Eliza Hall Institute of Medical Research	2019 Australian Infectious Diseases Research Centre Eureka Prize for Infectious Diseases Research	
Hala Zreiqat	University of Sydney	2019 ANSTO Eureka Prize for Innovative Use of Technology	
Laura Mackay	University of Melbourne	2019 Macquarie University Eureka Prize for Outstanding Early Career Researcher	
Team GreyScan	University of Tasmania	2019 Defence Science and Technology Eureka Prize for Outstanding Science in Safeguarding Australia	
Mariapia Degli-Esposti, Geoff Hill, Chris Andoniou, Peter Fleming, Paulo Martins	Monash University, Lions Eye Institute, QIMR Berghofer Medical Research Institute	2019 UNSW Eureka Prize for Scientific Research	
Melody Ding	University of Sydney	2019 3M Eureka Prize for Emerging Leader in Science	
Branka Vucetic	University of Sydney	2019 CSIRO Eureka Prize for Leadership in Innovation and Science	
Barry Pogson	Australian National University	2019 University of Technology Sydney Eureka Prize for Outstanding Mentor of Young Researchers	
FrogID Team	Australian Museum	2019 Department of Industry, Innovation and Science Eureka Prize for Innovation in Citizen Science	
Michael Lucy		2019 Finkel Foundation Eureka Prize for Long-Form Science Journalism	
Darren Saunders	University of New South Wales	2019 Celestino Eureka Prize for Promoting Understanding of Science	
Liam Mannix	The Age	2019 Australian Museum Eureka Prize for Science Journalism	
National Indigenous Science Education Program	Macquarie University, Charles Sturt University, Yaegl Country Aboriginal Elders	2019 Department of Industry, Innovation and Science Eureka Prize for STEM Inclusion	
Finn Thomas	St Mary's Catholic Primary School, Concord, NSW	2019 University of Sydney Sleek Geeks Science Eureka Prize - Primary	
Ellie Cole, Tsambika Galanos	Presbyterian Ladies' College, Sydney, NSW	2019 University of Sydney Sleek Geeks Science Eureka Prize - Secondary	

=== 2018 ===
Winner	Affiliation	Prize	Refs
RE100	Australian National University	2018 NSW Office of Environment and Heritage Eureka Prize for Environmental Research	
Fang Chen, Yang Wang, Jianjia Zhang, Zhidong Li, Bin Liang	Smart Infrastructure Team, CSIRO's Data61	2018 University of Technology Sydney Eureka Prize for Excellence in Data Science	
Optical Physics in Neuroscience	University of Queensland	2018 UNSW Eureka Prize for Excellence in Interdisciplinary Scientific Research	
CF Air	Metro North Hospital and Health Service, The Prince Charles Hospital, QIMR Berghofer Medical Research Institute Children's Health Queensland, University of Queensland, Griffith University, Gold Coast Health, Queensland University of Technology	2018 Australian Infectious Diseases Research Centre Eureka Prize for Infectious Diseases Research	
Anthony S. Weiss	University of Sydney	2018 Johnson & Johnson Eureka Prize for Innovation in Medical Research	
Wendy Erber, Kathryn Fuller, Henry Hui	The University of Western Australia	2018 ANSTO Eureka Prize for Innovative Use of Technology	
Mohsen Rahmani	Australian National University	2018 Macquarie University Eureka Prize for Outstanding Early Career Researcher	
The Sapphire Clock Team	The Institute for Photonics and Advanced Sensing - University of Adelaide, Cryoclock Pty Ltd	2018 Defence Science and Technology Eureka Prize for Outstanding Science in Safeguarding Australia	
Sally Dunwoodie	Victor Chang Cardiac Research Institute	2018 UNSW Eureka Prize for Scientific Research	
Elizabeth New	University of Sydney	2018 3M Eureka Prize for Emerging Leader in Science	
Thomas Maschmeyer	University of Sydney	2018 CSIRO Eureka Prize for Leadership in Innovation and Science	
Nalini Joshi	University of Sydney	2018 University of Technology Sydney Eureka Prize for Outstanding Mentor of Young Researchers	
QuestaGame		2018 Department of Industry, Innovation and Science Eureka Prize for Innovation in Citizen Science	
Adam Geiger	SeaLight Pictures Pty Ltd	2018 Department of Industry, Innovation and Science Eureka Prize for Science Journalism	
Alan Duffy	Swinburne University of Technology, The Royal Institution of Australia	2018 Celestino Eureka Prize for Promoting Understanding of Science	
Amelia Lai, Caitlyn Walker	Presbyterian Ladies' College, Sydney, NSW	2018 University of Sydney Sleek Geeks Science Eureka Prize - Primary	
Ella Woods, Emily Woods	St Margaret's Anglican Girls School, QLD	2018 University of Sydney Sleek Geeks Science Eureka Prize - Secondary	

=== 2017 ===
Winner	Affiliation	Prize	Refs
Catchment Sediment Budget Research Team	Griffith University	2017 NSW Office of Environment and Heritage Eureka Prize for Environmental Research	
Geoffrey Webb	Monash University	2017 University of Technology Sydney Eureka Prize for Excellence in Data Science	
Aboriginal Heritage Project	University of Adelaide, South Australian Museum	2017 UNSW Eureka Prize for Excellence in Interdisciplinary Scientific Research	
The Scabies Research Team	Murdoch Children's Research Institute, Kirby Institute, St Vincent's Hospital Sydney, Menzies School of Health Research	2017 Australian Infectious Diseases Research Centre Eureka Prize for Infectious Diseases Research	
The Colvera Team	CSIRO, Clinical Genomics Pty Ltd, Flinders University	2017 Johnson & Johnson Eureka Prize for Innovation in Medical Research	
FREO_{2}	University of Melbourne	2017 ANSTO Eureka Prize for Innovative Use of Technology	
Madhu Bhaskaran	RMIT University	2017 Macquarie University Eureka Prize for Outstanding Early Career Researcher	
Richard Mildren	Macquarie University	2017 Defence Science and Technology Eureka Prize for Outstanding Science in Safeguarding Australia	
Bacteria Busters: Elena Ivanova, Saulius Juodkazis	Swinburne University of Technology	2017 UNSW Eureka Prize for Scientific Research	
Andrew Whitehouse	Telethon Kids Institute	2017 3M Eureka Prize for Emerging Leader in Science	
Salah Sukkarieh	University of Sydney	2017 CSIRO Eureka Prize for Leadership in Innovation and Science	
Justin Gooding	University of New South Wales	2017 University of Technology Sydney Eureka Prize for Outstanding Mentor of Young Researchers	
Ngukurr Wi Stadi bla Kantri (We Study the Country) Research Team	Macquarie University, Yugul Mangi Rangers, Ngukurr School	2017 Department of Industry, Innovation and Science Eureka Prize for Innovation in Citizen Science	
Julia Peters, Wain Fimeri, Dr Jordan Nguyen, Riley Saban, Ili Baré, Lizzy Nash		2017 Department of Industry, Innovation and Science Eureka Prize for Science Journalism	
Amelia Lai, Caitlyn Walker	Presbyterian Ladies' College, Sydney, NSW	2017 University of Sydney Sleek Geeks Science Eureka Prize - Primary	
Eliza Dalziel, Claire Galvin, Georgia Hannah, Anna Hardy	St Monica's College, QLD	2017 University of Sydney Sleek Geeks Science Eureka Prize - Secondary	

=== 2016 ===
Winner	Affiliation	Prize	Refs
Thales Australia		2016 Defence Science and Technology Eureka Prize for Outstanding Science in Safeguarding Australia	
Lisa Harvey-Smith	CSIRO Astronomy and Space Science	2016 Department of Industry, Innovation and Science Eureka Prize for Promoting Understanding of Australian Science Research	
Patricia M. Davidson	Centre for Cardiovascular and Chronic Care, University of Technology Sydney	2016 University of Technology Sydney Eureka Prize for Outstanding Mentor of Young Researchers	
Ewa Goldys, Martin Gosnell	Macquarie University, ARC Centre of Excellence for Nanoscale BioPhotonics, Quantitative Pty Ltd	ANSTO Eureka Prize for Innovative Use of Technology	
Michael Bowen	University of Sydney	Macquarie University Eureka prize for Outstanding Early Career Researcher	
Hayden Ingle	Banksmeadow Primary School, Sydney	2016 University of Sydney Sleek Geeks Science Eureka Prize for Primary Schools	
Gordon Wallace	University of Wollongong	2016 CSIRO Eureka Prize for Leadership in Innovation and Science	
David Huang and his team	Walter and Eliza Hall Institute of Medical Research	Johnson & Johnson Eureka Prize for Innovation in Medical Research	
Sonya Pemberton, Wain Fimeri, Dr Derek Muller, Steve Westh		2016 Department of Industry, Innovation and Science Eureka Prize for Science Journalism	
Melissa Little, Minoru Takasato	Murdoch Children's Research Institute	2016 UNSW Eureka Prize for Scientific Research	
Leann Tilley and her team	University of Melbourne	2016 Australian Infectious Diseases Research Centre Eureka Prize for Infectious Disease Research	
Sharath Sriram	RMIT University	2016 3M Eureka Prize for Emerging Leader in Science	
Philip Bland and the Fireballs in the Sky team	Curtin University	Department of Industry, Innovation and Science Eureka Prize for Innovation in Citizen Science	
Alistair Forrest and FANTOM5 project	Harry Perkins Institute of Medical Research	2016 Scopus Eureka Prize for Excellence in International Scientific Collaboration	
Claire Galvin, Anna Hardy	St Monica's College, Cairns	2016 University of Sydney Sleek Geeks Science Eureka Prize for Secondary Schools	
Dr Denise Hardesty, Dr Chris Wilcox, Tonya Van Der Velde, TJ Lawson, Matt Landell, Dr David Milton	CSIRO Marine Debris team	2016 NSW Office of Environment and Heritage Eureka Prize for Environmental Research	
Ross Large and his team including Prof John Long	University of Tasmania	2016 UNSW Eureka Prize for Excellence in Interdisciplinary Research	

=== 2015 ===
List of winners:

- NSW Office of Environment and Heritage - Eureka Prize for Environmental Research
  - A global standard for environmental threats from coral reef to desert dunes
  - Professor David Keith and the IUCN Red List of Ecosystems Team, UNSW
- UNSW - Eureka Prize for Excellence in Interdisciplinary Scientific Research
  - World's smallest, brightest nano-flashlights finding a diseased needle in a haystack
  - Professor Dayong Jin, University of Technology, Sydney; Macquarie University; and ARC Centre for Nanoscale Biophotonics; Professor Tanya Monro, University of South Australia; University of Adelaide; and ARC Centre for Nanoscale Biophotonics; and Professor Bradley Walsh, Minomic International Ltd and Macquarie University
- Scopus - Eureka Prize for Excellence in International Scientific Collaboration
  - Looking for the right face in a multidimensional crowd
  - Professor Dacheng Tao, University of Technology, Sydney
- Australian Infectious Diseases Research Centre - Eureka Prize for Infectious Diseases Research
  - Time to die: killing cells to save lives
  - Pellegrini and Ebert Team, Walter and Eliza Hall Institute of Medical Research
- ANSTO - Eureka Prize for Innovative Use of Technology
  - Melting salt to store solar power
  - Associate Professor Frank Bruno, Dr Martin Belusko and Dr Steven Tay, University of South Australia
- Macquarie University - Eureka Prize for Outstanding Early Career Researcher
  - Inventing a quantum industry for Australia
  - Associate Professor Michael Biercuk, University of Sydney
- Defence Science and Technology Group - Eureka Prize for Outstanding Science in Safeguarding Australia
  - Battlefield communication by mobile, wi-fi and satellites
  - Northrop Grumman M5 Network Security
- Rural Research and Development Corporations - Eureka Prize for Rural Innovation
  - Vaccines for oysters
  - Professor David Raftos, Macquarie University
- UNSW - Eureka Prize for Scientific Research
  - World's smallest, brightest nano-flashlights finding a diseased needle in a haystack
  - Professor Peter Currie, Phong Nguyen, Monash University; and Dr Georgina Hollway, Garvan Institute of Medical Research
- 3M - Eureka Prize for Emerging Leader in Science
  - Looking beyond physics' Standard Model
  - Dr Phillip Urquijo, University of Melbourne
- CSIRO - Eureka Prize for Leadership in Science
  - Leading Australia's quantum future
  - Professor Michelle Simmons, UNSW
- University of Technology Sydney - Eureka Prize for Outstanding Mentor of Young Researchers
  - Nurturing the next generation of Australian researchers
  - Professor Marilyn Renfree AO, University of Melbourne
- Department of Industry and Science - Eureka Prize for Promoting Understanding of Australian Science Research
  - Speaking science underwater
  - Professor Emma Johnston, UNSW
- Department of Industry and Science - Eureka Prize for Science Journalism
  - Battle of the experts: inside the statin war
  - Dr Elizabeth Finkel, Cosmos Magazine
- New Scientist - Eureka Prize for Science Photography
  - 1. Soft Coral, Gary Cranitch, Queensland Museum
  - 2. Thorny-Headed Worm, Aileen Elliot, Murdoch University
  - 3. Saltwater Crocodile, Justin Gilligan
- University of Sydney Sleek Geeks - Science Eureka Prize - Primary
  - No need to shed tears over Australia's scientific future
  - Georgia (Gigi) S-M., and Ella W., St Margaret's Anglican Girls School, QLD
- University of Sydney Sleek Geeks - Science Eureka Prize - Secondary
  - The Secret of the Appendix
  - Paige B., Ivanhoe Girls Grammar School, VIC

=== 2014 ===
List of winners:

- Australian Government - Eureka Prize for Science Journalism
  - A shot in the arm for science journalism: talking to the vaccine-concerned
  - Sonya Pemberton, Genepool Productions.
- Australian Government - Eureka Prize for Promoting Understanding of Australian Science Research
  - Changing the way we talk about the science of climate change
  - Professor Lesley Hughes, Macquarie University
- University of Technology, Sydney - Eureka Prize for Outstanding Mentor of Young Researchers
  - Fighting substance abuse
  - Professor Maree Teesson, University of New South Wales
- Defence Science and Technology Organisation - Eureka Prize for Outstanding Science in Safeguarding Australia
  - Floaties for choppers
  - Tim Lyons, One Atmosphere
- CSIRO - Eureka Prize for Leadership in Science
  - (Not) curing cancer only part of the story
  - Professor Terence Speed, Walter and Eliza Hall Institute of Medical Research
- New Scientist - Eureka Prize for Science Photography
  - Through the Looking Glass
  - Dr Mark Talbot, CSIRO Plant Industry.
- University of Sydney - Sleek Geeks Science Eureka Prize – Primary
  - The hills are alive with the science of music
  - Harry Driessen, Croydon Public School,
- University of Sydney - Sleek Geeks Science Eureka Prize—Secondary
  - A ghostly feeling explains our sense of touch
  - Jackson Huang, Queensland Academy for Science, Mathematics and Technology
- NSW Office of Environment and Heritage - Eureka Prize for Environmental Research
  - 200 divers changing marine science
  - Professor Graham Edgar and Dr Rick Stuart-Smith, University of Tasmania.
- 3M - Eureka Prize for Emerging Leader in Science
  - Slow burning to capture carbon
  - Dr Adriana Downie, Pacific Pyrolysis Pty Ltd
- Department of Agriculture Landcare - Eureka Prize for Sustainable Agriculture
  - More wheat without adding water
  - Dr John Kirkegaard and Dr James Hunt, CSIRO and Stuart Kearns, Grains Research and Development Corporation
- Australian Infectious Diseases Research Centre - Eureka Prize for Infectious Diseases Research
  - First vaccine and treatment against Hendra virus, and first vaccine against any biosafety-level-4 disease
  - Hendra Virus Research Team, CSIRO
- ANSTO - Eureka Prize for Innovative Use of Technology
  - From Angry Birds to mobile laboratory: Turning smartphones into science labs for $2
  - DIY Droplet Lens, Garvan Institute of Medical Research and Australian National University
- Macquarie University - Eureka Prize for Outstanding Early Career Researcher
  - Tuning the clock of evolution
  - Associate Professor Simon Ho, University of Sydney
- University of New South Wales - Eureka Prize for Excellence in Interdisciplinary Scientific Research
  - A 1000-year climate history for Australia
  - SEARCH Project, University of Melbourne
- University of New South Wales - Eureka Prize for Scientific Research
  - B-cell mystery busted at last
  - B-cell Team, Walter and Eliza Hall Institute of Medical Research

=== 2013 ===
Her Excellency Professor Marie Bashir AC CVO, Governor of New South Wales, heads the guest list for the 2013 Australian Museum Eureka Prizes Awards Dinner on Wednesday, 4 September, at the Sydney Town Hall. The event was compered by the ABC's Bernie Hobbs and Dr Graham Philips. - Youtube Playlist of Winners

List of winners:

- CSIRO - Eureka Prize for Leadership in Science
  - From little things, big things grow
  - Professor Frank Caruso, University of Melbourne
- Macquarie University - Eureka Prize for Outstanding Young Researcher
  - The right place to spend our conservation dollars
  - Dr Kerrie Wilson, University of Queensland
- University of New South Wales - Eureka Prize for Scientific Research
  - Vitamin B reveals the role of mystery gut immune cells
  - Dr Lars Kjer-Nielsen and Professor James McCluskey, University of Melbourne, and Professor Jamie Rossjohn, Monash University
- University of New South Wales - Eureka Prize for Excellence in Interdisciplinary Scientific Research
  - Shine on you tiny diamonds.
  - Quantum Bio-probes, University of Melbourne
- University of Sydney Sleek Geeks - Science Eureka Prize - Primary
  - What is Friction?
  - Nathan Gori, Reuben Shepherd, Billy McLeod, Jack Dougall and Sacha Balme, Beauty Point Public School, NSW
- Caring for our Country Landcare - Eureka Prize for Sustainable Agriculture
  - The Future Farm Industries CRC Enrich Project Team, CSIRO, University of Western Australia and South Australian Research and Development Institute
- ANSTO - Eureka Prize for Innovative Use of Technology
  - Scanning round about like magic - Zebedee Team
  - Dr Elliot Duff, Dr Mike Bosse, Dr Robert Zlot, Paul Flick, Dr Peter Kambouris and Dr Gautam Tendulkar from CSIRO
- Australian Government - Eureka Prize for Science Journalism
  - Ian Townsend, ABC
- Australian Government - Eureka Prize for Promoting Understanding of Australian Science Research
  - Professor Rob Brooks University of New South Wales
- NSW Health Jamie Callachor - Eureka Prize for Medical Research Translation
  - Helping children walk.
  - Professor Steve Wilton and Professor Sue Fletcher, Murdoch University
- University of Technology, Sydney - Eureka Prize for Outstanding Mentor of Young Researchers
  - Professor Rick Shine AM FAA, University of Sydney
- Australian Museum University of Sydney Sleek Geeks - Science Eureka Prize – Secondary
  - The Spectacular Spider, Brandon Gifford, Casino High School, NSW
- Rio Tinto - Eureka Prize for Commercialisation of Innovation
  - Scanalyse/Outotec, Scanalyse Pty Ltd/Outotec and Curtin University
- NSW Office of Environment and Heritage - Eureka Prize for Environmental Research
  - Professor Chris Johnson, University of Tasmania; Dr Michael Letnic, University of New South Wales; Dr Euan Ritchie, Deakin University; Dr Arian Wallach, James Cook University; and Adam O'Neill, Evelyn Downs Station
- New Scientist - Eureka Prize for Science Photography
  - The dingo: from sinner to saviour.
  - Richard Wylie, Euakafa Island Research Centre
- Defence Science and Technology Organisation - Eureka Prize for Outstanding Science in Safeguarding Australia
  - Providing the very stuff of protection.
  - DMTC Armour Applications Program, Defence Materials Technology Centre
- Australian Infectious Diseases Research Centre - Eureka Prize for Infectious Diseases Research
  - A vaccine for mosquitoes – saving them and us from dengue.
  - Professor Scott O'Neill, Monash University; Professor Ary Hoffmann, University of Melbourne; Professor Scott Ritchie, James Cook University; Dr Elizabeth McGraw, Monash University; Dr Luciano Moreira, Oswaldo Cruz Foundation; and Professor Brian Kay, Queensland Institute of Medical Research
- 3M - Eureka Prize for Emerging Leader in Science
  - Numbers saving lives: maths vs pseudoscience in AIDS battle.
  - Associate Professor David Wilson, Kirby Institute, University of New South Wales

=== 2012 ===
List of winners:

- CSIRO - Eureka Prize for Leadership in Science
  - Professor Suzanne Cory
- Macquarie University - Eureka Prize for Outstanding Young Researcher
  - Dr Marie-Liesse Asselin-Labat, Walter and Eliza Hall Institute of Medical Research
- University of New South Wales - Eureka Prize for Scientific Research
  - Professor John Webb, Professor Victor Flambaum, Dr Julian King and Dr Julian Berengut, School of Physics at the University of New South Wales, and Associate Professor Michael Murphy, Swinburne University of Technology
- University of Sydney Sleek Geeks - Science Eureka Prize
  - Brandon Gifford, Year 11 student, Casino High School
- ANSTO - Eureka Prize for Innovative Use of Technology
  - Associate Professor Wei Shen with Professor Gil Garnier, Dr Xu Li, Junfei Tian, David Ballerini, Miaosi Li and Lizi Li, Department of Chemical Engineering, Monash University
- Australian Government - Eureka Prize for Science Journalism
  - Gisela Kaufman and Carsten Orlt, Kaufmann Production
- Australian Government - Eureka Prize for Promoting Understanding of Australian Science Research
  - Dr Rob Brander, School of Biological, Earth and Environmental Sciences, University of NSW
- NSW Health Jamie Callachor - Eureka Prize for Medical Research Translation
  - Professor David Kaye, Heart Failure Research Group, Baker IDI Heart and Diabetes Institute
- University of Technology, Sydney - Eureka Prize for Outstanding Mentor of Young Researchers
  - Professor Doug Hilton, Walter and Eliza Hall Institute of Medical Research
- Voiceless - Eureka Prize for Scientific Research that Contributes to Animal Protection
  - Professor Clive Phillips, University of Queensland
- DSTO - Eureka Prize for Outstanding Science in Support of Defence or National Security
  - Dr Yonggang Zhu
- Rio Tinto - Eureka Prize for Commercialisation of Innovation
  - Digitalcore, including Dr Victor Pantano, Professor Mark Knackstedt and Professor Tim Senden and Dr Adrian Sheppard, Research School of Physics and Engineering, ANU, and Professor Val Pinczewski and Associate Professor Christoph Arns, School of Petroleum Engineering, UNSW
- NSW Office of Environment and Heritage - Eureka Prize for Environmental Research
  - Dr Dana Cordell and Professor Stuart White, Institute for Sustainable Futures, University of Technology, Sydney
- Google Australia - Eureka Prize for Innovation in Computer Science
  - Associate Professor Jon McCormack, Peter McIlwain, Aidan Lane and Dr Alan Dorin, Centre for Electronic Media Art, Faculty of Information Technology, Monash University
- New Scientist - Eureka Prize for Science Photography
  - Jason Edwards for photograph, "First Documentation of a Humpback Whale Mating"
- Australian Infectious Diseases Research Centre at University of Queensland - Eureka Prize for Infectious Diseases Research
  - Dr Marc Pellegrini, with Jesse Toe and Simon Preston, Walter and Eliza Hall Institute of Medical Research
- NSW Trade & Investment - Eureka Prize for Science or Mathematics Teaching
  - Geoff McNamara, Melrose High School, Pearce, ACT
- 3M - Eureka Prize for Emerging Leader in Science
  - Dr Matthew Hill, CSIRO Materials Science and Engineering

=== 2011 ===
List of winners:

- CSIRO Eureka Prize for Leadership in Science
  - Professor Ben Eggleton, University of Sydney
- Macquarie University Eureka Prize for Outstanding Early Career Researcher
  - Dr Angela Moles, University of New South Wales
- University of New South Wales Eureka Prize for Scientific Research
  - Dr Andrea Morello and Professor Andrew Dzurak, University of New South Wales
- University of Sydney Sleek Geeks Science Eureka Prize - Primary
  - Anastasia K., Croydon Public School, NSW
- University of Sydney Sleek Geeks Science Eureka Prize - Secondary
  - Brandon G., Casino Christian School, NSW
- ANSTO Eureka Prize for Innovative Use of Technology
  - Dr John Arkwright, CSIRO, and Dr Philip Dinning, Flinders University
- Australian Government Peter Hunt Eureka Prize for Environmental Journalism
  - Mark Willacy, Mavourneen Dineen, Jun Matsuzono, Garth Thomas, Yumiko Asada and Yayoi Eguchi, Australian Broadcasting Corporation
- Australian Government Eureka Prize for Science Journalism
  - Dr Jonica Newby and Lile Judickas, Australian Broadcasting Corporation
- Australian Government Eureka Prize for Promoting Understanding of Australian Science Research
  - Professor Rick Shine, University of Sydney
- Department of Trade and Investment Jamie Callachor Eureka Prize for Medical Research Translation
  - Professor Murray Esler and Associate Professor Markus Schlaich, Baker IDI Heart and Diabetes Institute
- University of Technology, Sydney Eureka Prize for Outstanding Mentor of Young Researchers
  - Professor Jian-xin Zhao, University of Queensland
- Voiceless Eureka Prize for Scientific Research that Contributes to Animal Protection
  - Professor Paul McGreevy's Lab, University of Sydney
- DSTO Eureka Prize for Outstanding Science in Support of Defence or National Security
  - Professor Abdesselam Bouzerdoum, University of Wollongong
- Rio Tinto Eureka Prize for Commercialisation of Innovation
  - Dr Wojciech Gutowski, CSIRO
- Sherman Eureka Prize for Environmental Research
  - The Devils' Advocates, University of Tasmania, Griffith University, University of Sydney, Menzies Research Institute Tasmania and Save the Tasmanian Devil Program at Mt Pleasant Laboratories
- Google Australia Eureka Prize for Innovation in Computer Science
  - Associate Professor David Moss, University of Sydney
- New Scientist Eureka Prize for Science Photography
  - Jason Edwards
- New South Wales Government Eureka Prize for Advancement of Climate Change Knowledge
  - Skeptical Science, founded by John Cook
- New South Wales Office of Environment and Heritage Eureka Prize for Innovative Solutions to Climate Change
  - Professor Manfred Lenzen, Dr Christopher Dey and Dr Joy Murray, University of Sydney
- Australian Research Council Eureka Prize for Excellence in Research by an Interdisciplinary Team
  - Nanopatch Vaccination Team, University of Queensland
- Australian Infectious Diseases Research Centre Eureka Prize for Infectious Diseases Research
  - Cowman Team, Walter and Eliza Hall Institute of Medical Research
- Australian Catholic University Eureka Prize for Research in Ethics
  - Dr Paul Biegler, Monash University
- National Water Commission Professor Peter Cullen Eureka Prize for Water Research and Innovation
  - Professor R. Quentin Grafton, Dr Hoang Long Chu and Professor Tom Kompas, Australian National University, and Dr Michael Stewardson, University of Melbourne
- 3M Eureka Prize for Emerging Leader in Science
  - Associate Professor Kevin Pfleger, Western Australian Institute for Medical Research
- Australian Museum Eureka Prizes People's Choice Award
  - Professor Alan Mackay-Sim, Griffith University

=== 2005 ===
- Eureka Prize for Scientific Research: Peter Tuthill for aperture masking interferometry
- Eureka Prize for Environmental Journalism: Åsa Wahlquist
- Eureka Prize for Research in Ethics: James Franklin
- Eureka Prize for Promoting Understanding of Science: John Robert de Laeter and David Blair

=== 2003 ===
The 2003 Australian Museum Eureka Prizes dinner, was compered by Sally Loane, Adam Spencer and Robyn Williams, and attended by some 800 people at the Horden Pavilion of Fox Studios on Tuesday 12 August 2003.

- Australian Museum - Eureka Prize for Industry
  - How much did you spend on electricity today?
  - Wireless Monitors Australia
- Australian Computer Society - Eureka Prize for ICT Innovation
  - Jamming online - Soundbyte.org - PowerHouse Museum
- Engineers Australia - Eureka Prize for Engineering Innovation
  - Recycling Waste Tyres - John Dobozy from Molectra Technologies
- Australian Catholic University - Eureka Prize for Research in Ethics
  - Craig Fry from the Turning Point Alcohol and Drug Centre
- Australian Skeptics - Eureka Prize For Critical Thinking
  - The Bible Code is bunk - Brendan McKay at the Australian National University
- British Council - Eureka Prize for Inspiring Science
  - Teleporting light: spooky action at a distance - Ping Koy Lam and Warwick Bowen at the Australian National University
- - GRDC - Eureka Prize for Research to Improve the Environmental Sustainability of Graingrowing
  - Native grasses a natural choice for Australian agriculture - Ted Lefroy, Christine Davies and David Waugh from CSIRO and the University of Western Australia
- Royal Botanic Gardens Sydney - Eureka Prize for Biodiversity Research
  - The Atlas of Crested Pigeons - Professor Henry Nix, President of Birds Australia.
- Royal Societies of Australia - Eureka Prize for Interdisciplinary Scientific Research
  - Understanding your brainwaves - The Brain Dynamics Team involves some 20 researchers and is led by Professor Peter A Robinson University of Sydney, Dr Chris J Rennie Westmead Hospital, and Dr Evian Gordon University of Sydney
- Sherman - Eureka Prize for Environmental Research
  - CSIRO Climate Impact Group - consists of Dr Penny Whetton, Dr Barrie Pittock, Mr Kevin Hennessy, Dr Roger Jones, Dr Kathy McInnes, Dr Ramasamy Suppiah, Dr Kevin Walsh, Ms Cher Page, Ms Janice Bathols, Mr Bob Cechet and Dr Ian Watterson.
- University of New South Wales - Eureka Prize for Scientific Research
  - A new frontier in gene therapy - Levon Khachigian NHMRC - University of New South Wales.
- Education, Science and Training - Eureka Prize for the Promotion of Science
  - Cathy Foley - CSIRO Division of Telecommunication & Industrial Physics.
- Education, Science and Training - Michael DaleyEureka Prize for Science Journalism
  - Alien Underworld - Sonya Pemberton
- Environment Australia - Peter Hunt - Eureka Prize for Environmental Journalism
  - Wentworth Group of Concerned Scientists - Nick Grimm
- Engineers Australia - Eureka Prize for Engineering Journalism
  - Firestorm - Andrew Holland
- Pfizer - Eureka Prize for Health and Medical Research Journalism
  - Winner - Times 2 - Daniel William writer for Time Magazine
- Reed New Holland - Eureka Science Book Prize
  - Waterbug Book - John Gooderham and Edward Tsyrlin from CSIRO
- Adam Spencer - University of Sydney - Eureka Schools Prize for Lateral Thinking
  - Harsh Reality TV Show to address drug use - Janak Ramakrishnan, Rachael Tiong and Lisa Law from Baulkham Hills High School,
- EPA - Allen Strom - Eureka Prize for Environmental Education Program
  - Schools can halve their waste - EcoRecycle Victoria Waste Wise Schools' Program developed by the EcoRecycle Victoria and Gould League.
- Macquarie University - Eureka Schools Prize for Earth, Environmental and Planetary Sciences
  - Solar furnaces and desalinisation - Ryan Bose student at Keebra Park State High School
- University of Sydney Faculty of Science - Eureka Schools Prize for Biological Sciences
  - Triggering growth after a bush fire - James Teow, Beverley The, Sophie Bond, Bojana Stepanovic, Stephen Rose, Tim Marmoy, Yagan Mckay, Alex Jurkiewicz and Rebecca Wood from Shenton College

=== 2002 ===
The 2002 Australian Museum Eureka Prize was compered by Amanda Keller and Adam Spencer at Fox Studios on 13 August 2002.

- Australian Catholic University - Eureka Prize for Research in Ethics
  - Unemployment - is mutual obligation ethical? - Philosopher Dr Jeremy Moss at the University of Melbourne
- Australian Skeptics - Eureka Prize for Critical Thinking
  - Trust me, I'm a science communicator - Rob Morrison science communicator and journalist
- Royal Botanic Gardens Sydney - Eureka Prize for Biodiversity Research
  - Logs, forests, computers - a winning combination - Dr Bob Pressey of the NSW National Parks and Wildlife Service
- Sherman - Eureka Prize for Environmental Research
  - Reduce, reuse, recycle! - Eric Kennedy and Bogdan Dlugogorski - University of Newcastle
- University of New South Wales - Eureka Prize for Scientific Research
  - Understanding bugs: from anthrax to yoghurt - Dr Elizabeth Harry - University of Sydney
- Australian Computer Society - Eureka Prize for ICT Innovation
  - Save drivers' lives - Alex Zelinsky, Richard Hogg, & Glen Dickins - Seeing Machines Pty Ltd
- Australian Museum - Eureka Prize for Industry
  - Trashed office equipment parts make good - Eco Manufacturing Centre of Fuji Xerox
- Institution of Engineers Australia - Eureka Prize for Engineering Innovation
  - LNG Microcell - Professor Robert Amin of Curtin University of Technology
- Adam Spencer/University of Sydney - Eureka Schools Prize for Lateral Thinking
  - Sandan Amardoru & Peter Clarke - Mount Waverley Secondary College
- Allen Strom - Eureka Prize for Environmental Education Program
  - Teaching and learning for a sustainable future - Professor Ian O'Connor Griffith University
- Macquarie University - Eureka Schools Prize for Earth, Environmental and Planetary Sciences
  - The effect of dust on the growth of young eucalypts - Matilde-Jane student at Mercedes College
- University of Sydney Faculty of Science - Eureka Schools Prize for Biological Sciences
  - Frogs are disappearing around the world - Ling San Lau student at Rosny College
- Education, Science and Training - Eureka Prize for the Promotion of Science
  - Professor Ian Lowe - Griffith University
- Education, Science and Training - Michael Daley - Eureka Prize for Science Journalism
  - Tackling scientific fraud - Norman Swan and Katrina Bolton from ABC Radio National
- Environment Australia - Peter Hunt - Eureka Prize for Environmental Journalism
  - A river in trouble - Wimmera Mail-Times
- Institution of Engineers Australia - Eureka Prize for Engineering Journalism
  - Positive engineering solutions for agribusiness - Peter Lewis ABC Landline
- Pfizer - Eureka Prize for Health and Medical Research Journalism
  - Age Gene Discovery team - Samantha O'Connor, Jo Chandler, & Michael Schlechta
- Reed New Holland - Eureka Science Book Prize
  - A short history of Planet Earth - Professor Ian Plimer

=== 2001 ===
- John A. Long for Promotion of Science

=== 1997 ===
- Penny van Oosterzee won her second Eureka Prize

=== 1995 ===
- Ian Plimer, of the University of Melbourne Department of Earth Sciences, author of Telling Lies for God

=== 1994 ===
- Dr Barbara Hardy of the Investigator Science and Technology Centre, Adelaide, won the prize for science promotion
- Dr Kath Bowmer, deputy chief of CSlRO's Division of Water Resources, for environmental research
- Petaluma Wines of South Australia for application of science to wine-making
- Dr David Malin, author of A View of the Universe and Mary E. White, author of The Browning of Australia, shared prize

=== 1993 ===
- Patricia Vickers-Rich, of Monash University, and Tom Rich, of the Museum of Victoria for their book Wildlife of Gondwana
- Professor David Allen, astronomer at the Anglo-Australian Observatory, for science promotion

=== 1992 ===
- Questacon, hands-on science demonstrations centre in Canberra won the prize for education
- Dr Jim May and the Australian Minerals Industry Research Association (AMIRA) of Victoria, won the prize for industry
- The coral spawning team led by members of the Museum of Tropical Queensland, Townsville, for environmental research
- Professor Paul Davies, for his book The Mind of God

=== 1991 ===
- Ben Selinger of ANU, author of Chemistry in the Marketplace
- Professor Paul Davies of the University of Adelaide, author of several best-sellers
- Peter Laver of BHP Limited recognizing that company's investment in R&D
- Peter Keating of Biotech International, also for investing in R&D
- Martin Green, founder and director of the Centre for Photovoltaic Devices and Systems at the University of NSW
- Penny Van Oosterzee won the science book prize for The Centre, on Australia's desert regions.

=== 1990 ===
- The inaugural Eureka Prize for Industry was awarded by the panel of seven judges to F. H. Faulding for a slow-release form of analgesic.
