= Mark Febbraio =

Researcher

Mark Anthony Febbraio
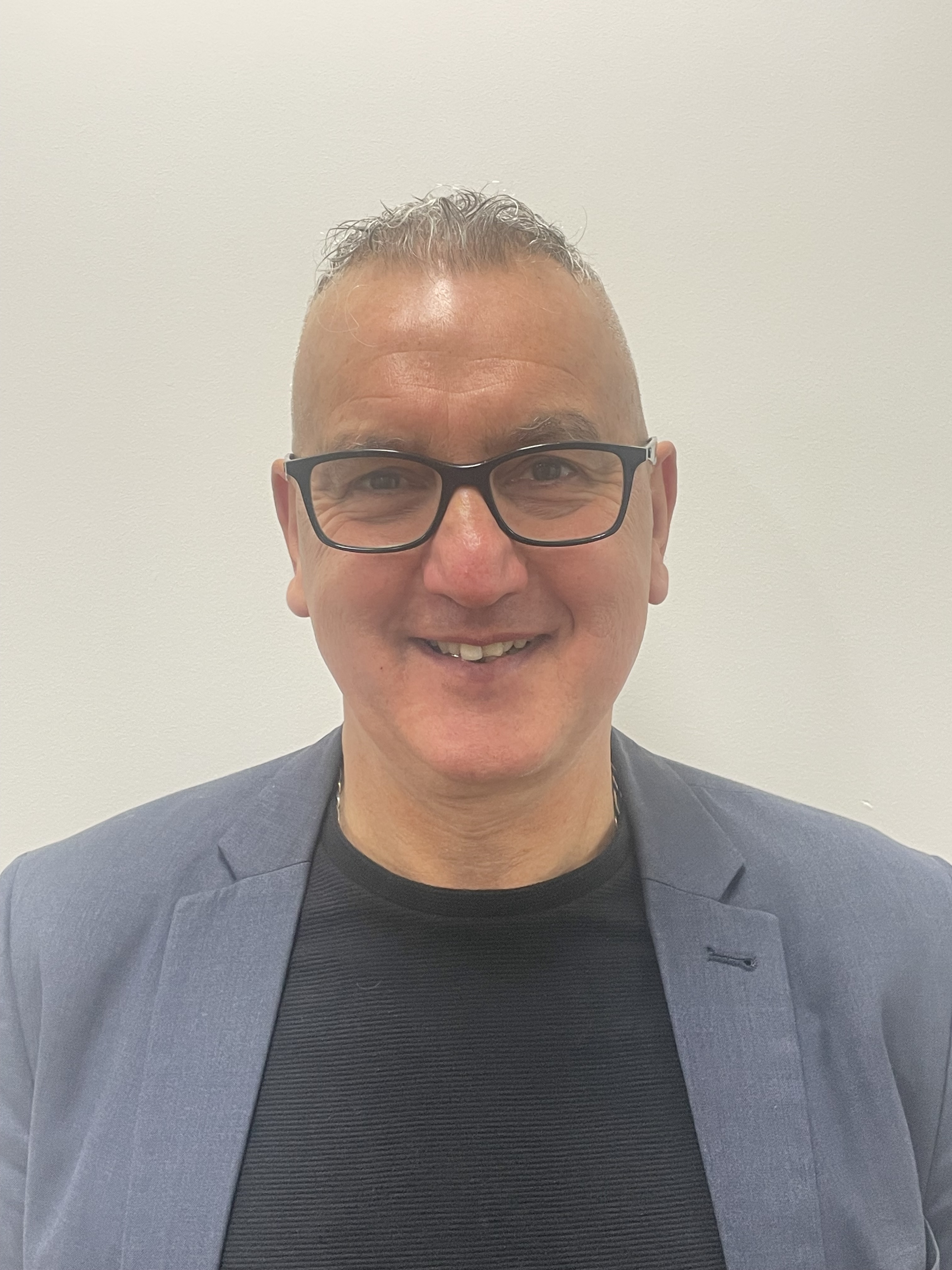
- Occupations: Physiologist, academic and researcher
- Awards: UNSW Eureka Prize for Scientific Research, Australian Museum (2020); GSK Award for Research Excellence, GSK (2020)

Academic background
- Education: Victoria University (Australia)

Academic work
- Institutions: Monash University; National Health and Medical Research Council (NHMRC)

Mark Anthony Febbraio is a physiologist, academic and researcher. He is a professor and head of the Cellular and Molecular Metabolism laboratory at the Baker Heart and Diabetes Institute and at Monash Institute of Pharmaceutical Sciences (MIPS) of Monash University and a Senior Principal Research Fellow of the National Health and Medical Research Council (NHMRC).

Febbraio's research focuses on the mechanisms linked to exercise, obesity, type 2 diabetes, and cancer, to develop drugs to treat lifestyle-related diseases. He has received several awards including the 1999 A K McIntyre Prize for significant contributions to Australian Physiological Science, the 2017 Kellion Award from the Australian Diabetes Society (ADS), the 2020 UNSW Eureka Prize for Scientific Research from the Australian Museum, the 2020 GSK Award for Research Excellence, the 2021 International Medal from the Society for Endocrinology and the Kirsten and Freddy Johansen Rigshospitalet International Award for Danish Medical Science.

Febbraio has delivered several named lectures, including the Colin I Johnson Lectureship by the High Blood Pressure Research Council of Australia (2006), the ESA/ADS Joint Plenary Lecture (2009), the Sandford Skinner Oration (2011), The Kellion Lecture (2017) and The AuPS Invited Lecture 2024. He is The Deputy Editor in Chief of the Journal of Sport & Health Sciences.

== Early life and education ==
Febbraio completed his undergraduate degree in Applied Sciences (Physical Education) (1987) and has a Diploma of Education on Science from Hawthorn Institute of Education (1989). He obtained his PhD in Chemistry and Biology (1994) at Victoria University in Footscray, Victoria, Australia.

== Career ==
Febbraio served on the Council of the Australian Diabetes Society from 2004 to 2008, including a term as Honorary Treasurer from 2006 to 2008. He has held a position on the board of directors for the Centre for Physical Activity Research in Copenhagen and is a member of the Healthier Lives International Science Advisory Panel in New Zealand. He was Head of Diabetes and Metabolism at the Garvan Institute of Medical Research. He discovered that the HSP72 activator BGP-15 can ameliorate insulin resistance in mice, leading to his appointment as Chief Scientific Officer of N-Gene Pharmaceuticals. His HSP72 project grant was also named one of the “Ten of the Best” by the NHMRC in 2012. He holds an appointment as a professor and head of the Cellular and Molecular Metabolism Laboratory within the Drug Discovery Program at MIPS and is a senior principal research fellow at the NHMRC.

Febbraio has been involved in community leadership by participating in the Williamson Community Leadership Program by the Victoria State Government and co-hosting the radio show "The Science of Sport" on the SEN radio network from 2014 to 2018, focusing on the health benefits of regular physical activity.

=== Sporting career ===
Febbraio spent some time (1988–1990) competing in Ironman Triathlon at the International Level. He was a member of JAL Team Australia (1990) and completed the 1989 Ironman Triathlon World Championships in Kona, Hawaii, USA.

== Research ==
Febbraio's work highlights his co-discovery that contracting skeletal muscles secrete endocrine factors called myokines, which influence the biology of other organs. This finding advanced his research into the molecular mechanisms behind the health benefits of exercise and its disease-preventive effects by demonstrating that myokines can protect against metabolic diseases and certain cancers, leading to the development of a new class of drugs targeting these conditions through the identification of crucial genes, proteins, and pathways. He has secured grants from the Australian Research Council, NIH, and Diabetes Australia Research Trust, and his discoveries have earned him patents in the field.

=== Myokines ===
Febbraio, along with Bente Pedersen from the University of Copenhagen, found that skeletal muscle had the ability to produce and release proteins known as true endocrine factors, leading them to introduce the term "myokine". He furthered the understanding of interleukin 6 (IL-6) as a myokine, demonstrating through human infusion studies that exercise-released IL-6 stimulated liver glucose production to support muscle nutrient supply. In a subsequent study, his lab demonstrated that IL-6 acted as a powerful insulin sensitizer, shedding light on exercise's therapeutic potential for metabolic diseases. This discovery thrusted IL-6 into investigations on how exercise influenced insulin action and metabolism.

One of Febbraio's highly cited studies discussed the role of skeletal muscle as an endocrine organ, focusing on the myokine IL-6, its regulation by exercise, its signaling pathways, and its metabolic impact on health and disease. Building upon his work on IL-6, he reviewed the mechanisms and biological roles of muscle-derived IL-6 in response to exercise and its potential as a therapeutic drug for metabolic disorders. He also looked into the role of TNF-α, reviewing how physical exercise and IL-6 infusion inhibit endotoxin-induced TNF-α production, providing evidence that exercise mediates anti-inflammatory activity through muscle-released IL-6.

In 2006, Febbraio discovered that ciliary neurotrophic factor (CNTF), a cytokine related to IL-6, can prevent obesity and insulin resistance. In related research, he referred to the trans-signaling process, where a soluble form of a receptor (such as sgp130) enables signaling by a cytokine (like IL-6) that would otherwise require a membrane-bound receptor. He then demonstrated that overexpression of sgp130Fc effectively blocked IL-6 trans-signaling, preventing macrophage infiltration into adipose tissue in obesity. His discoveries led him to develop IC7Fc, a synthetic IL-6/CNTF chimeric peptide, which activated the gp130 receptor signalling complex. His paper published in Nature demonstrated IC7Fc's efficacy in improving glucose tolerance, reducing hyperglycemia, and preventing weight gain and liver steatosis in obese mice.

Febbraio's collaborative work also introduced the concept that communication between tissues during exercise is facilitated by extracellular vesicles (EVs), which are lipid-bound vesicles released by cells into the extracellular space and transport proteins and miRNA. This discovery, noted for its significant impact, led to ongoing research into EVs' roles in diseases like fatty liver disease and cancers, along with the paper being highlighted by a feature article in the New York Times titled The Mysterious Interior World of Exercise.

== Awards and honors ==
- 1999 – AK McIntyre Medal, Australian Physiological Society
- 2011 – Sandford Skinner Oration, University of Melbourne
- 2017 – Kellion Award, Australian Diabetes Society
- 2020 – UNSW Eureka Prize for Scientific Research, Australian Museum
- 2020 – GSK Award for Research Excellence, GSK
- 2021 – International Medal, Society for Endocrinology
- 2022 – Kirsten and Freddy Johansen Rigshospitalet International Award for Danish Medical Science, Kirsten and Freddy Johansen Foundation

== Selected articles ==
- Febbraio, M. A., & Pedersen, B. K. (2002). Muscle‐derived interleukin‐6: mechanisms for activation and possible biological roles. The FASEB journal, 16(11), 1335–1347.
- Starkie, R., Ostrowski, S. R., Jauffred, S., Febbraio, M., & Pedersen, B. K. (2003). Exercise and IL‐6 infusion inhibit endotoxin‐induced TNF‐α production in humans. The FASEB Journal, 17(8), 1–10.
- Carey, A. L., Steinberg, G. R., Macaulay, S. L., Thomas, W. G., Holmes, A. G., Ramm, G., ... & Febbraio, M. A. (2006). Interleukin-6 increases insulin-stimulated glucose disposal in humans and glucose uptake and fatty acid oxidation in vitro via AMP-activated protein kinase. Diabetes, 55(10), 2688–2697.
- Pedersen, B. K., & Febbraio, M. A. (2008). Muscle as an endocrine organ: focus on muscle-derived interleukin-6. Physiological reviews, 88(4), 1379–1406.
- Pedersen, B. K., & Febbraio, M. A. (2012). Muscles, exercise and obesity: skeletal muscle as a secretory organ. Nature Reviews Endocrinology, 8(8), 457–465.
