= Carol Armour =

Carol Armour AM is an Australian researcher specialising in asthma, and an emerita professor of pharmacology at the University of Sydney. She completed a Bachelor of Pharmacy with honours and a PhD (both at the University of Sydney). Her research ranged from cellular level investigations to translation of asthma research into the health system.

Carol was a member of the Australian Respiratory Council's research committee. She was a NHMRC Research Committee member and Pro Vice Chancellor, Research, at The University of Sydney, before taking up a position as the Executive Director of the Woolcock Institute in 2012 and retiring in 2024. In 2020, Carol was awarded the prestigious Eureka Prize for Outstanding Mentor of Young Researchers, in recognition of her lifelong passion for mentoring and career development of staff and students.

== Honours ==
- 2005 – Fellow of the Pharmaceutical Society
- 2007 – Australasian Pharmaceutical Science Association medal for research
- 2019 – Member of the Order of Australia for "significant services to medical education and to asthma management"
- 2020 – Australian Museum Eureka Prize for Outstanding Mentor of Young Researchers

== Research ==
Armour's research is in basic cellular and molecular studies on the pathophysiology of asthma, as well as using new models of community pharmacy to manage chronic disease. Her investigations span the breadth of asthma research from the cellular mechanisms to the translation of new ways to treat asthma within the health system.

Her work has influenced both scientific understanding and practical management of chronic respiratory disease, and she has played a significant role in shaping research careers and academic leadership at the University of Sydney.

== Selected works ==
- Armour, C., Bosnic-Anticevich, S., Brillant, M., Burton, D., Emmerton, L., Krass, I., ... & Stewart, K. (2007). Pharmacy Asthma Care Program (PACP) improves outcomes for patients in the community. Thorax, 62(6), 496-592.
- Armour, Carol & Lemay, Kate & Saini, Bandana & Reddel, Helen & Bosnic-Anticevich, Sinthia & Smith, Lorraine & Burton, Deborah & Song, Yun & Alles, Marie & Stewart, Kay & Emmerton, Lynne & Krass, Ines. (2011). Using the Community Pharmacy to Identify Patients at Risk of Poor Asthma Control and Factors which Contribute to this Poor Control. The Journal of asthma : official journal of the Association for the Care of Asthma. 48. 914-22.
- Armour, Carol & Reddel, Helen & Lemay, Kate & Saini, Bandana & Smith, Lorraine & Bosnic-Anticevich, Sinthia & Song, Yun & Alles, M & Burton, Deborah & Emmerton, Lynne & Stewart, Kay & Krass, Ines. (2012). Feasibility and Effectiveness of an Evidence-Based Asthma Service in Australian Community Pharmacies: A Pragmatic Cluster Randomized Trial. The Journal of asthma: official journal of the Association for the Care of Asthma. 50.
- Armour, C. L., Reddel, H. K., Lemay, K. S., Saini, B., Smith, L. D., Bosnic-Anticevich, S. Z., ... & Krass, I. (2013). Feasibility and effectiveness of an evidence-based asthma service in Australian community pharmacies: a pragmatic cluster randomized trial. Journal of Asthma, 50(3), 302-309.
