= Degli Esposti =

Degli Esposti is a surname. Notable people with the surname include:

- Mariapia Degli-Esposti (fl. 2003), Australian immunologist
- Piera Degli Esposti (1938–2021), Italian actress
