= Maschmeyer =

Maschmeyer is a surname. Notable people with the surname include:

- Emerance Maschmeyer (born 1994), Canadian hockey player
- Carsten Maschmeyer (born 1959), German businessman, investor, speaker, and author
- Thomas Maschmeyer (born 1966), German-Australian chemist
