= David Talmage =

American immunologist (1919–2014)

David Wilson Talmage (September 15, 1919 – March 6, 2014) was an American immunologist. He made significant contributions to the clonal selection theory.

== Career ==
Talmage was born to American Presbyterian missionaries in Japanese-controlled Korea. He was educated by home school and mission school until attending a boarding school in Pyongyang for secondary education. Talmage received his BS from Davidson College in 1941 and his MD from Washington University in St. Louis in 1944. From 1952 to 1959 he was associate professor of medicine at the University of Chicago. From 1959 he was professor of medicine at the University of Colorado, professor of microbiology from 1960 to 1986, and distinguished professor starting in 1986. Between 1973 and 1983 he served as director of Webb-Waring Lung Institute and as associate dean of research from 1983 to 1986. He won the inaugural American Association of Immunologists Lifetime Achievement Award in 1994.

Talmage's protégé Andor Szentivanyi discovered The Beta Adrenergic Theory of Asthma.

He died at the age of 94 on March 6, 2014.
