= Kristin Carson-Chahhoud =

Australian medical researcher

Kristin Carson-Chahhoud is an Australian medical researcher specialising in lung health. She is an associate professor at the University of South Australia, heading a research group in the Adelaide Medical School. Specialising in respiratory medicine, tobacco control and management of tobacco-related illnesses, Carson aims to close the gap between clinical research trials and real-world patient care.

== Education ==
After completing a Certificate III in Laboratory Skills in 2004 and a Diploma in Laboratory Technology (Pathology Testing) in 2007 at TAFE SA, Carson completed a Doctor of Philosophy in Medicine (PhD) in 2015 at the University of Adelaide. Her PhD thesis was titled "Advancing treatment options for tobacco cessation, prevention and related illnesses, with particular reference to Indigenous populations" and was completed while working full-time for SA Health as one of their youngest Senior Medical Research Scientists. Carson's thesis was awarded the Dean's Commendation for Doctoral Thesis Excellence. In 2015 Carson was awarded the Master of Science in Public Policy and Management Scholarship and completed a Master of Science in Public Policy and Management (MSPPM) at Carnegie Mellon University in 2016. She has been supported as an NHMRC/Cancer Australia TRIP Fellow as well as with project grants from the NHMRC.

== Awards and prizes ==
Carson has been awarded the 2021 Eureka Prize for Emerging Leader in Science for her work on lung health. Carson is recognised by ExpertScape as being in the top 1.3% of experts worldwide on smoking.

Carson has also been awarded:

- 2021 Recognised as one of SA's Top 40 under 40 Entrepreneurs and Business Leaders
- 2019 James McWha Rising Star Award awarded by The University of Adelaide
- 2016 Ann Woolcock Young Investigator Award awarded by The Thoracic Society of Australia and New Zealand
- 2015 Ross Wishart Memorial Award recipient at the Australia Society of Medical Research South Australia annual scientific meeting
- 2015 Named one of the Australian Financial Review and Westpac 100 Women of Influence
- 2015 South Australian Tall Poppy awarded by The Australian Institute of Policy and Science and the Tall Poppy Campaign
- 2015 Young Australian of the Year for South Australia
- 2014 Premier's Channel 9 Young Achiever of the Year

== Research ==
Carson's research focuses on lung health, especially in tobacco-related illnesses, tobacco control and respiratory medicine. Carson's work in translational health research and evidence-based medicine and producing evidence through Cochrane systematic analyses, qualitative research and multi-centre randomised controlled trials, show her commitment to a smoke-free Australia. Her research leadership has allowed her to link research findings with real-world patient care to benefit the broader community. Carson uses innovative augmented reality technology (including holographic technology and virtual reality) to disrupt health communication and deliver evidence-based medicine. Carson has published over 95 papers, contributed to patient care, policy and practice both locally and internationally, and advised governments on plain packaging, tobacco-related legislation and lung health.

After completing her PhD, Carson was a Postdoctoral Research Fellow at the University of Adelaide from 2015 to 2018. In 2018, Carson was appointed Associate Research Professor at the University of South Australia. Carson is a Research Fellow with the South Australian Health and Medical Research Institute (SAHMRI) and leads the Translational Medicine and Technology research group in the Australian Centre for Precision Health. Carson's has conducted research in partnership with the Asthma Foundation of South Australia and has received funding from the NHMRC and Cancer Australia.

=== Selected publications ===
Year	TItle	Journal
2012	Training health professionals in smoking cessation	Cochrane Database of Systematic Reviews
2017	Non‐invasive ventilation for the management of acute hypercapnic respiratory failure due to exacerbation of chronic obstructive pulmonary disease	Cochrane Database of Systematic Reviews
2012	Non‐invasive positive pressure ventilation for treatment of respiratory failure due to severe acute exacerbations of asthma	Cochrane Database of Systematic Reviews
2013	Physical training for asthma	Cochrane Database of Systematic Reviews
2003	Gastro-oesophageal reflux treatment for asthma in adults and children	Cochrane Database of Systematic Reviews
2019	Burden of chronic obstructive pulmonary disease and its attributable risk factors in 204 countries and territories, 1990- 2019: results from the Global Burden of Disease Study	BMJ

== Media ==
Carson has provided expert opinion on vice news about the need to confirm the therapeutic efficacy of e-cigarettes and vaping to aid quitting smoking. She has appeared on 2SER 107.3 radio to discuss the perception that vaping is less harmful than tobacco smoking. Carson has published in The Conversation about Indigenous smoking programs and the tobacco giant John Morris acquiring a British health company, Ventura. Carson's team's research on using augmented reality to alleviate symptoms of anxiety and improve asthma control in children was reported on Channel 7 news. Carson has discussed her work on training health professionals to help people quit smoking and physical training for asthma on the Cochrane podcast.
