= Raina MacIntyre =

Sri Lankan professor of Global Biosecurity

- Born: 1964 (age 61–62); Colombo, Sri Lanka
- Education: University of Sydney; Australian National University
- Awards: Eureka Prize for Leadership in Innovation and Science, 2022
- Scientific career
- Workplaces: University of New South Wales
- Doctoral advisor: Aileen Plant

Raina MacIntyre is an Australian epidemiologist and academic. She is the Professor of Global Biosecurity within the Kirby Institute at University of New South Wales and a National Health and Medical Research Council Principal Research Fellow, who leads a research program on the prevention and control of infectious diseases. She is an expert media advisor and commentator on Australia's response to COVID-19.

== Early life and education ==
Born in Colombo in 1964, MacIntyre moved to Australia in 1973. She was educated at Sydney Girls' High School, where she graduated as (equal) Dux of the school, before studying medicine at the University of Sydney. She was among the first graduates of the Master of Applied Epidemiology program established at the Australian National University by American epidemiologist Michael Lane, to whom she credits her interest in infectious disease epidemiology. She is the daughter of Sri Lankan-Australian playwright Ernest MacIntyre and Eleanor Nalini MacIntyre.

== Career ==
MacIntyre's work is focused on emerging infections, encompassing vaccines, personal protective equipment, aerosol dynamics, respiratory pathogen transmission, and the detection and prevention of bioterrorism. Other research interests include medical ethics and the prevention of disease in older people. Macintyre has more than 380 peer-reviewed publications, and contributes to expert committees and editorial boards.

After completing her PhD under Aileen Plant, MacIntyre was awarded a Harkness Fellowship to Johns Hopkins University.

In Australia, MacIntyre became "a familiar face on television and radio" during the Covid-19 pandemic, her epidemiological commentary "calmly delivered from her bedroom, where she continues her research almost around the clock".

== Media ==
MacIntyre has been a regular commentator and contributor to Covid epidemiology, in The Guardian, The Sydney Morning Herald, as well as ABC News and Q+A. In a lunch interview with The Sydney Morning Herald she was described as a 'globally renowned" and "the cautious coronavirus communicator".

MacIntyre has been interviewed extensively for her expertise during the pandemic in Australia, including an interview on booster jabs, by Norman Swan from the ABC, and about vaccination roll-outs across different states. She is recognised as one of the "most recognisable faces whom the Australian media has designated an expert during COVID-19". Her modelling, from the Kirby Institute, has been used to determine whether states will re-open or not.

MacIntyre's portrait was painted for the 2021 Archibald Prize by artist Karen Black. Due to the frequent media appearances, she caught Black's fancy and the artist "set her heart on painting the professor for the Archibald Prize". "How she explained the scientific facts around aspects of the virus was easy to comprehend," Karen Black commented.

== Books ==
- Macintyre, Raina (2022). Dark Winter: An insider's guide to pandemics and biosecurity. Kensington, NSW: NewSouth Books. ISBN 978-1-74223-767-1. OCLC 1344309165.
- Macintyre, Raina (2025). Vaccine Nation: Science, reason and the threat to 200 years of progress. Kensington, NSW: NewSouth Books. ISBN 978-1-76117-005-8. OCLC 1481633883.

== Prizes and awards ==
- 2003 – Frank Fenner Prize
- 2007 – Sir Henry Wellcome Medal and Prize from the Association of Military Surgeons of the US for her work on bioterrorism
- 2014 – Peter Baume Public Health Impact Prize
- 2014 – Public Health Association of Australia, National Immunisation Achievement Award
- 2016 – Fellow of the Royal Society of New South Wales
- 2017 – CAPHIA Research Team Prize
- 2021 – Women's Agenda Frontline Hero
- 2022 – Winner, Department of Defence Eureka Prize for Leadership in Science and Innovation
- 2024 – Fellow of the Australian Academy of Health and Medical Sciences
- 2025 - AmCham Alliance Highly Commended award for Google Innovator of The Year
- 2026 - AmCham Alliance Chairman's Choice Award and Highly Commended Award for Fujitsu Security & Resilience

== Selected publications ==
- Narasimhan, Padmanesan; Wood, James; MacIntyre, Chandini Raina; Mathai, Dilip (12 February 2013). "Risk Factors for Tuberculosis". Pulmonary Medicine. 2013 e828939. doi:10.1155/2013/828939. ISSN 2090-1836. PMC 3583136. PMID 23476764.
- MacIntyre, C. Raina; Cauchemez, Simon; Dwyer, Dominic E.; Seale, Holly; Cheung, Pamela; Browne, Gary; Fasher, Michael; Wood, James; Gao, Zhanhai; Booy, Robert; Ferguson, Neil (February 2009). "Face Mask Use and Control of Respiratory Virus Transmission in Households". Emerging Infectious Diseases. 15 (2): 233–241. doi:10.3201/eid1502.081166. ISSN 1080-6040. PMC 2662657. PMID 19193267.
- Bahl, Prateek; Doolan, Con; de Silva, Charitha; Chughtai, Abrar Ahmad; Bourouiba, Lydia; MacIntyre, C Raina (1 May 2022). "Airborne or Droplet Precautions for Health Workers Treating Coronavirus Disease 2019?". The Journal of Infectious Diseases. 225 (9): 1561–1568. doi:10.1093/infdis/jiaa189. ISSN 0022-1899. PMC 7184471. PMID 32301491.
- MacIntyre, C. Raina; Seale, Holly; Dung, Tham Chi; Hien, Nguyen Tran; Nga, Phan Thi; Chughtai, Abrar Ahmad; Rahman, Bayzidur; Dwyer, Dominic E.; Wang, Quanyi (1 April 2015). "A cluster randomised trial of cloth masks compared with medical masks in healthcare workers". BMJ Open. 5 (4) e006577. doi:10.1136/bmjopen-2014-006577. ISSN 2044-6055. PMC 4420971. PMID 25903751.
- Ngonghala, Calistus N.; Iboi, Enahoro; Eikenberry, Steffen; Scotch, Matthew; MacIntyre, Chandini Raina; Bonds, Matthew H.; Gumel, Abba B. (1 July 2020). "Mathematical assessment of the impact of non-pharmaceutical interventions on curtailing the 2019 novel Coronavirus". Mathematical Biosciences. 325 108364. doi:10.1016/j.mbs.2020.108364. ISSN 0025-5564. PMC 7252217. PMID 32360770.
