= Dana Cordell =

Australian academic

Dana Cordell is a Research Director at the Institute for Sustainable Futures at the University of Technology Sydney, where she directs and undertakes international and Australian research on sustainable food and phosphorus futures. Cordell's work in sustainability research has been recognised with the Eureka Prize for Environmental Research (2012), a Banksia Mercedes-Benz Environmental Research Award, the Advance Food and Agriculture Award (2016) and she was named one of Australia's 100 Women of Influence (2013).

== Education ==
Cordell was awarded a PhD in Sustainable Futures from the University of Technology Sydney and a PhD in Water and Environmental Studies from Linköping University, Sweden, as part of a cotutelle agreement between the two universities with her thesis "The Story of Phosphorus: Sustainability implications of global phosphorus scarcity for food security".
