= Hala Zreiqat =

Australian biomedical engineer

Professor Hala Zreiqat AM FAA FTSE FAHMS FRSN

Personal details
- Born: Jordan
- Occupation: Biomechanical engineer

Hala Zreiqat is a biomechanical engineer whose research focuses on the development of novel engineered synthetic materials and 3D printed platforms for regenerative medicine. She is a Payne-Scott Professor in the Department of Biomechanical Engineering at the University of Sydney.

== Education and career ==
Zreiqat was born in Jordan. However, she grew up in the West Bank, before returning to Jordan to study biology at the University of Jordan in Amman. She received a scholarship for her studies attached to a commission in the Jordanian Armed Forces. After graduation she worked at the King Hussein Medical Centre, where she was officially a First lieutenant.

In 1991, Zreiqat moved to Australia to study a PhD in Medical Sciences at the University of New South Wales.

From 2010 to 2012, she was President of the Australian and New Zealand Orthopaedic Research Society, the first woman to be the Society's president.

In 2016/17, Zreiqat undertook a Radcliffe Fellowship at Harvard University, the first person from NSW to do so. The focus of her fellowship was to develop educational and industry research collaborations between Australia and the United States in her research area of musculoskeletal disorders and biomaterials, and to gain skills in rapid research translation and commercialisation.

Since 2018, she has been the Director of the Australian Research Council (ARC) Training Centre for Innovative BioEngineering. The centre aims to create technologies to improve treatments and outcomes for challenging medical conditions; develop a data capture framework for continuous improvement of technologies; and produce a skilled workforce to advance this work in the future.

In 2019, she was made a Member of the Order of Australia for "... significant service to biomedical engineering, and to research councils" and in 2020, she was nominated for, and awarded, a Payne-Scott Professorial Distinction from the University of Sydney, which recognises "sustained academic achievement and dedication to the University's values, and for playing an active role in developing strategic initiatives, and [...] outstanding contributions to the University community."

In 2021, she was awarded a Fulbright Senior Scholarship to work at Massachusetts Institute of Technology alongside Professor Robert Langer. The focus of her scholarship was to learn about research translation and commercialisation to then apply this to the commercialisation of regenerative medicine research in Australia.

== Research ==
Zreiqat's work focuses on creating new engineered synthetic materials and developing technologies to 3D print replacement body parts for people suffering from injury and disease, particularly in orthopaedic, dental and maxillofacial contexts. She holds a number of patents for her novel materials.

=== 3D printed bone scaffold ===
One strand of her research has looked at creating a scaffold that will stimulate bone regrowth at sites of injury or defect. The scaffold is made of a novel ceramic containing trace elements and nanoparticles needed for bone growth. The ceramic is porous to allow blood and nutrients to infiltrate. The scaffold can be 3D printed to match the defect site and will degrade in the body as it is replaced by bone. This technology could be used to replace metal implants which have a finite lifespan, thus reducing the need for repeat surgeries and the associated time, costs and risk of complications.

In 2019, she was awarded the ANSTO Eureka Prize for Innovative Use of Technology for this research as well as a place on the list of Australia's most Innovative Engineers (2020).

=== 'Instruction manual' for cells ===
Through research in collaboration with the Children's Medical Research Institute (CMRI) at Westmead, Zreiqat and her team have used 3D photolithographic printing to guide stem cells to form organised structures. Using bioengineering and cell culture techniques, the team created stem cells from blood and skin cells. They then used chemical and mechanical signals to replicate the natural developmental process to support the cells to create organised tissues. This technology has potential future implications in developing organs for transplant and treating vision loss as a result of macular degeneration.

=== Synthetic material to heal tendons and ligaments ===
Zreiqat's team has also developed a synthetic substance that could mimic or replace tendon and ligament tissue, potentially speeding up recovery from injury. In a collaboration with Columbia University and the University of Erlangen-Nuremberg, researchers have developed fibre-reinforced hydrogel scaffolds which have the same stress resistance and water volume as real tissue which should support collagen growth.

== Equity and inclusion ==
In addition to her research work, Zreiqat has founded projects to improve access to opportunities for women and young scientists. In recognition of her contributions to regenerative medicine and orthopaedic research in NSW and commitment to improving opportunities for women around the world, Zreiqat was named the 2018 NSW Premier's Woman of the Year.

=== BIOTech Futures ===
BIOTech Futures aims to inspire students' passion for technology and innovation. Early-career researchers and undergraduate students work with high school teachers and students to tackle biotechnology challenges.

=== IDEAL Society ===
IDEAL (Inclusion Diversity Equity Action Leadership) Society, an international, intergenerational, interdisciplinary network, supported by the University of Sydney and Harvard University, which aims to "transform society so that both women and men can pursue their dreams, fulfill their potential, exercise leadership, and be respected for their achievements."

== Diplomacy ==
Zreiqat is a board member and chair (2020-2027) of the Council for Australian-Arab Relations (CAAR), which aims to "broaden and strengthen Australian-Arab relations by advancing areas of shared political, economic, and social interest and building a greater appreciation of each other's cultures and values."

== Awards ==
- Fellow of the Australian Academy of Science (2021)
- Payne-Scott Professorial Distinction (2020)
- Fellow of the Australian Academy of Technology & Engineering (2020)
- Member of the Order of Australia (2019)
- Fellow of the Australian Academy of Health and Medical Sciences (2019)
- Fellow of the Royal Society of NSW (2019)
- NSW Premier's Award for Woman of the Year (2018)
- The King Abdullah II Order of Distinction of the Second Class - the highest civilian honor bestowed by the King of Jordan (2018)
