= Melody Ding =

Australian medical researcher

Melody Ding is an Australian epidemiologist and population behavioural scientist in the Sydney School of Public Health at the University of Sydney. She is a Professor at the University of Sydney. She is also a member of the Charles Perkins Centre and the Sydney Southeast Asia Centre. Ding's research aims to improve population health through epidemiological research and behavioural change.

== Career ==
Melody Ding completed her undergraduate education in marine biology at Ocean University of China and her PhD through the Joint Doctoral Program in Public Health at the University of California San Diego and San Diego State University in 2012. She relocated to Australia for her postdoctoral research and is now a Professor at the University of Sydney.

Ding's research program lies at the intersection of lifestyles, physical activity, epidemiology, and chronic disease prevention and is devoted to generating policy-relevant research outcomes. She "aims to identify disease-causing risk factors, develop solutions for prevention, educate the public, and guide evidence-based policymaking." Ding expanded the field of lifestyle epidemiology by studying interactions among lifestyle risk factors and their impact on physical and mental health and longevity, including obesity, physical activity, sleep, social participation, retirement, and a vegetarian diet. Her research identified the combinations of physical activity, not smoking and active social participation as the strongest predictor for longevity. One facet of Ding's research is identifying changes that can be made to the built environment, such as making cities more 'walkable', to prevent chronic diseases, such as obesity and cardiovascular disease. Ding's research into the COVID-19 pandemic and physical activity has shown the effects of the pandemic varied around the world, potentially due to differences in infection control strategies between countries.

Since 2013, Melody has been awarded $2.5 million in research funding from the NHMRC, Heart Foundation, and other organisations. In 2021, Ding was awarded an NHMRC Investigator Grant – Emerging Leadership 2 and a NSW Health Cardiovascular Early-Mid Career Researcher Grant to design a decision-support tool for physical activity strategies.

Ding published the first-ever estimate for the global economic burden of physical inactivity, showing that inactivity cost healthcare systems $53 billion in 2013 and physical inactivity-related deaths cost the world $14 billion in productivity losses. This research also showed that a larger proportion of the economic burden is bourne by high income countries, whereas the low- and middle-income countries bear more of the disease burden.

== Awards and prizes ==
Ding's work on the global economic burden of physical inactivity has become one of the most frequently cited papers in physical activity and was recognised as one of the Most Impactful Publication in 2016 by American Heart Association. Ding has published over 160 peer reviewed papers and is one of the top two percent of researchers in her field according to a Stanford University study in 2022.

Ding has also been awarded:

- 2021 The Ministerial Award for Rising Stars in Cardiovascular Research
- 2019 Eureka Prize for Emerging Leader in Science
- 2019 Homeward Bound Participant
- 2018 Sydney Research Accelerator (SOAR) Fellowship
- 2018 AIPS NSW Young Tall Poppy of the Year
- 2017 University of Sydney Vice-Chancellor's Awards for Excellence: Outstanding Early Career Research

== Media ==
Ding has published in The Conversation on retirement, diet, risk for Alzheimer’s disease and diabetes, health impacts of sitting, and a Research Check assessing a reported potential link between nicotine and COVID-19. Her work has been covered in The Conversation, The Pulse, ABC News, SBS News and the SMH. Ding has provided expert commentary on physical activity on ABC Radio National, ABC News, BBC News and in the SMH and The Guardian, and has been profiled by The Lancet.

== Selected publications ==
- Ding Ding, Kenny D Lawson, Tracy L Kolbe-Alexander, Eric A Finkelstein, Peter T Katzmarzyk, Willem van Mechelen, Michael Pratt -The economic burden of physical inactivity: a global analysis of major non-communicable diseases (The Lancet, 2016)
- Ding Ding, James F Sallis, Jacqueline Kerr, Suzanna Lee, Dori E Rosenberg - Neighborhood environment and physical activity among youth: a review, (American Journal of Preventive Medicine, 2011)
- Esther MF van Sluijs, Ulf Ekelund, Inacio Crochemore-Silva, Regina Guthold, Amy Ha, David Lubans, Adewale Oyeyemi, Ding Ding, Peter T Katzmarzyk - Physical activity behaviours in adolescence: current evidence and opportunities for intervention (The Lancet, 2021)
- Ding Ding, Klaus Gebel - Built environment, physical activity, and obesity: what have we learned from reviewing the literature? (Health & Place, 2012)
- Emmanuel Stamatakis, Joanne Gale, Adrian Bauman, Ulf Ekelund, Mark Hamer, Ding Ding -Sitting time, physical activity, and risk of mortality in adults (Journal of American College of Cardiology, 2019)
- Daniel L Surkalim, Mengyun Luo, Robert Eres, Klaus Gebel, Joseph van Buskirk, Adrian Bauman, Ding Ding - The prevalence of loneliness across 113 countries: systematic review and meta-analysis (British Medical Journal Publishing Group, 2022)
- Ding Ding, Edward W Maibach, Xiaoquan Zhao, Connie Roser-Renouf, Anthony Leiserowitz - Support for climate policy and societal action are linked to perceptions about scientific agreement (Nature Climate Change, 2011)
- Klaus Gebel, Ding Ding, Tien Chey, Emmanuel Stamatakis, Wendy J Brown, Adrian E Bauman - Effect of moderate to vigorous physical activity on all-cause mortality in middle-aged and older Australians (JAMA Internal Medicine, 2015)
- Dori Rosenberg, Ding Ding, James F Sallis, Jacqueline Kerr, Gregory J Norman, Nefertiti Durant, Sion K Harris, Brian E Saelens - Neighborhood Environment Walkability Scale for Youth (NEWS-Y): reliability and relationship with physical activity (Preventive Medicine, 2009)
- Emmanuel Stamatakis, Ulf Ekelund, Ding Ding, Mark Hamer, Adrian E Bauman, I-Min Lee - Is the time right for quantitative public health guidelines on sitting? A narrative review of sedentary behaviour research paradigms and findings (British Journal of Sports Medicine, 2019)
- Justin Richards, Xiaoxiao Jiang, Paul Kelly, Josephine Chau, Adrian Bauman, Ding Ding - Don't worry, be happy: cross-sectional associations between physical activity and happiness in 15 European countries (BMC Public Health, 2015)
- L Laranjo, D Ding, B Heleno, B Kocaballi, JC Quiroz, HL Tong, B Chahwan, AL Neves, E Gabarron, KP Dao, D Rodrigues, GC Neves, ML Antunes, E Coiera, DW. Bates - Do smartphone applications and activity trackers increase physical activity in adults? Systematic review, meta-analysis and metaregression (British Journal of Sports Medicine, 2021)
- Ding Ding, Borja del Pozo Cruz, Mark A Green, Adrian E Bauman - Is the COVID-19 lockdown nudging people to be more active: a big data analysis (British Journal of Sports Medicine, 2020)
- Ding Ding, Kris Rogers, Hidde van der Ploeg, Emmanuel Stamatakis, Adrian E Bauman - Traditional and emerging lifestyle risk behaviors and all-cause mortality in middle-aged and older adults: evidence from a large population-based Australian cohort (PLoS Medicine, 2015)
