= Woolcock Institute of Medical Research =

Australian medical institute

- Motto: Leaders in breathing & sleep research
- Founder: Ann Woolcock
- Established: 1981; 45 years ago
- Mission: Medical research
- Focus: Sleep and respiratory disorders; lung cancer; and tuberculosis
- Chair: Robert Estcourt
- Executive Director: Carol Armour
- Faculty: Macquarie University
- Staff: 200
- Budget: A$13 million (2015)
- Formerly called: Institute of Respiratory Medicine
- Location: 2 Innovation Road, Macquarie Park, Sydney, New South Wales, Australia; Hanoi, Vietnam
- Website: woolcock.org.au

The Woolcock Institute of Medical Research (WIMR) is an Australian medical research institute that is focused on the prevention and treatment of sleep and respiratory disorders, lung cancer, and tuberculosis. Affiliated with the University of Sydney and the Royal Prince Alfred Hospital, the Woolcock Institute is located in the Sydney suburb of Glebe, New South Wales; with a satellite office located in Hanoi, Vietnam. In July 2012 Carol Armour became executive director of the Woolcock Institute.

== History and facilities ==
The institute was founded in 1981 by Ann Woolcock, a professor of respiratory medicine/science at the Sydney Medical School and was originally called the Institute of Respiratory Medicine. It was renamed for Woolcock in 2002 after she died in 2001. The research institute has collaborative agreements with the Hunter Area Health Service, the University of Newcastle, and Liverpool, Concord and Royal North Shore Hospitals.

Originally the Woolcock Institute of Medical Research was located within the Royal Prince Alfred Hospital in Camperdown before it was relocated to a custom-built building in Glebe in 2008.

== See also ==
- Health in Australia
- Sleep disorder
