= Catriona Bradshaw =

Australian clinician-scientist and sexual health physician

- Known for: Research on antimicrobial resistance in sexually transmitted infections (including Mycoplasma genitalium); research on bacterial vaginosis and partner treatment
- Awards: Australian Museum Eureka Prize (team award, 2022); TIME100 Health (2025)
- Scientific career
- Fields: Sexual health medicine, infectious diseases, public health
- Workplaces: Melbourne Sexual Health Centre; Monash University; University of Melbourne

Catriona Bradshaw is an Australian clinician-scientist and sexual health physician whose research focuses on antimicrobial resistance and antimicrobial stewardship in sexual health. She leads research a program on Mycoplasma genitalium at the Melbourne Sexual Health Centre and holds academic appointments at Monash University and the University of Melbourne.

== Career and research ==
Bradshaw is based at the Melbourne Sexual Health Centre, where she leads translational research in sexual health. Her work has addressed antimicrobial resistance in STIs, including the evolution of macrolide and fluoroquinolone antibiotic resistance in Mycoplasma genitalium and its implications for treatment strategies.

Bradshaw has also led clinical research on bacterial vaginosis (BV). In 2025, a randomized controlled trial reported that treating male partners alongside women reduced BV recurrence compared with treating women alone, supporting sexual transmission and informing changes in management approaches.

== Recognition ==
In 2022, Bradshaw was part of a team awarded an Australian Museum Eureka Prize in infectious diseases for work related to sexual health and infectious disease research. In the same year she was elected a Fellow of the Australian Academy of Health and Medical Sciences.

In 2025, Bradshaw was named to TIME magazine's TIME100 Health list, citing her work on bacterial vaginosis and women’s health.
