= Katrina A. Jolliffe =

Australian supramolecular and organic chemist

Katrina A. Jolliffe FRSN FAA FRACI
- Other name: Kate Jolliffe
- Education: University of New South Wales
- Scientific career
- Fields: Organic chemistry
- Workplaces: University of Sydney
- Thesis: Approaches to the synthesis of giant multichromophores (1997)

Katrina (Kate) Anne Jolliffe is an Australian supramolecular and organic chemist and professor at the University of Sydney.

In 2002 Jolliffe was awarded an ARC fellowship at the University of Sydney. She was made a senior lecturer in 2007, promoted associate professor in 2008 and full professor in 2009. From 2013 to 2016 she was head of the school of chemistry.

Jolliffe is a Fellow of both the Royal Society of New South Wales and the Royal Australian Chemical Institute. In 2020 she was elected a Fellow of the Australian Academy of Science. She has won a number of awards including the Biota Award for Medicinal Chemistry, A. J. Birch, H.G. Smith Memorial medals, and Margaret Sheil Leadership Awards from the Royal Australian Chemical Institute.

== Research interests ==
Jolliffe's research interests include the development of molecules that recognise and sense anions, and the synthesis of natural and novel cyclic peptides.

== Honours and awards ==
- Winner of the 2024 Eureka Prize for Outstanding Mentor of Researchers

== Selected works ==
- Stuart N Berry; Lei Qin; William Lewis; Katrina A. Jolliffe (18 June 2020). "Conformationally adaptable macrocyclic receptors for ditopic anions: analysis of chelate cooperativity in aqueous containing media". Chemical Science. 11 (27): 7015–7022. doi:10.1039/d0sc02533j. ISSN 2041-6520. PMC 7690315. PMID 33250974. Wikidata Q103727984.
- Natalie Trinh; Katrina A Jolliffe; Elizabeth New (13 July 2020). "Dual-functionalisation of fluorophores for the preparation of targeted and selective probes". Angewandte Chemie International Edition. 59 (46): 20290–20301. doi:10.1002/anie.202007673. ISSN 1433-7851. PMID 32662086. Wikidata Q97538401.
- Stephen M Butler; Katrina A. Jolliffe (1 October 2020). "Molecular recognition and sensing of dicarboxylates and dicarboxylic acids". Organic and Biomolecular Chemistry. 18 (41): 8236–8254. doi:10.1039/d0ob01761b. ISSN 1477-0520. PMID 33001119. Wikidata Q100405116.
