= Ben Selinger =

Australian chemist

Ben Selinger AM FRACI

Personal details
- Born: Benjamin Klaas Selinger; 23 January 1939 (age 87) Sydney, New South Wales, Australia
- Occupation: Chemist

Benjamin Klaas Selinger AM (born 23 January 1939) is an Australian chemist, for many years a professor with the chemistry department of the Australian National University, later head of department and Professor Emeritus. He is perhaps best known as a consumer advocate and author. His Chemistry in the Marketplace, first published in 1968, is from June 2017 in its sixth edition.

== History ==
Selinger was born in Sydney, the eldest son of German-Jewish refugees Hilde Selinger (died 19 May 1994) and Herbert Selinger (died 1973). His father, who was naturalized as an Australian citizen in 1944, was an electrical engineer and lecturer at the N.S.W. University of Technology. He is credited with inculcating in his son the need to investigate the workings of things.

He grew up in the Sydney suburb of Oatley, and was educated at Mortdale Public School and Sydney Boys' High School. After completing his (then compulsory) National Service training he enrolled at the University of Sydney, graduating in 1960 with an Honours degree in surface chemistry. He achieved his Masters degree in electron spin resonance spectroscopy in 1961. He spent two years as a teaching Fellow at Sydney University, then earned his PhD 1962–1964 at the University of Stuttgart.

In 1973, he was appointed a member of the Food Standards Committee of the National Health and Medical Research Council (NHMRC).

In 1973, he became associated with the Australian Consumers Association, publishers of Choice magazine, elsewhere cited as a twelve-year involvement 1960s–1970s.

He had a particular interest in forensic science, critical of the way scientific evidence is produced in court. and the uncritical acceptance of scientific evidence as produced in the Lindy Chamberlain trial. He had much to say on the balance of risk versus utility in various materials and substances; the way public opinion and political decision-making could be affected by media interpretation in the cases of asbestos and 2,4,5-T.

== Publications ==
=== Books ===
- Ben Selinger, Russell Barrow Chemistry in the Marketplace 6th edition June 2017 CSIRO Publishing

"Whether your interest is swimming pools or sunscreen, pharmaceuticals or polymers, or simply a desire to put your chemistry into more familiar contexts, this book has much to offer... the wealth of detailed information is both interesting and enlightening. One could read the book from cover to cover but my view is that its strength lies in its range and detail, making it much more likely to be dipped into when looking for anecdotes or for some facts and figures to brighten up a lesson or create a resource." Janet Mitchell, School Science Review 99(366), September 2017

=== Journals ===
As a research scientist, by 1991 he had published 129 papers in science journals.

The Canberra Times published numerous articles on chemistry subjects by Selinger. Longer articles under his byline include:

- "Dial-a-drunk for Safety". The Canberra Times. Vol. 63, no. 19, 505. 4 March 1989. p. 25. (science of the breathalyser)
- "Bursting the Education Bubble". The Canberra Times. Vol. 63, no. 19, 512. 11 March 1989. p. 21. (university politics and froth)
- "Chemistry, a social performer". The Canberra Times. Vol. 63, no. 19, 568. 6 May 1989. p. 20. (teaching and research)
- "Seasoning reveals secrets of soup". The Canberra Times. Vol. 63, no. 19, 596. 3 June 1989. p. 7. (surface tension and forensic science)
- "Green guide for environmentally-aware consumers". The Canberra Times. Vol. 63, no. 19, 618. 25 June 1989. p. 22. (thoughts on controversial subjects)
- "Sniffing out chemical truths". The Canberra Times. Vol. 70, no. 21, 807. 31 December 1994. p. 18. (review of a book by British counterpart John Emsley)

Articles published in Chemistry magazine, published by the Royal Australian Chemical Institute, include:

- "A Good Measure of Beer and Sunscreen". April 2018. Archived from the original on 2023-07-04.
- "Touchy Feely". June 2018. Archived from the original on 2023-12-04.
- "Sticky and sugary solutions — Polarising Questions". September–October 2018. Archived from the original on 2023-12-04.
- "Paracelsus in the Marketplace". March–April 2019. Archived from the original on 2024-04-11.
- "Crabby Chemicals". September–October 2019. Archived from the original on 2024-04-09.
- "From a Cats Whisker". March–April 2020. Archived from the original on 2024-04-09.
- "A whiff of Chemical Harmony". September–November 2020. Archived from the original on 2024-04-07.
- "Water, Oil and Cling — It's a Surface Thing". January–February 2021. Archived from the original on 2024-04-07.
- "Looking at Light". March–May 2021. Archived from the original on 2024-04-07.
- "Specifically About Heat". June–August 2021. Archived from the original on 2024-04-04.
- "An Inconvenient pH". September–November 2021. Archived from the original on 2024-04-02.

== Recognition ==
In 1991, Selinger was made a Fellow of the Australian Academy of Technological Sciences and Engineering. Later that year he was awarded a Eureka Prize, recognising his contribution to science journalism. He donated the $2000 cash prize to Canberra's Jewish community; it was used to inaugurate the Selinger–Hollander prize, to be awarded annually to the young boy or girl who contributed most to the community during that year.

In 1998, he was appointed Professor Emeritus at the Australian National University, Canberra.

In 2007, he was made a Member of the Order of Australia (AM).

== Other interests ==
Selinger and his wife were active in the social life of Canberra's Jewish community — in the 2000s they organised a series of lectures entitled "Beyond the Pale" and a men's group "Grumps R Us".

== Family ==
Selinger married Veronica "Vera" Hollander sometime around 1967 and had a home in Garran, A.C.T. They had two sons, Adam Selinger (born c. 1970) and Michael Jorg Selinger (born 12 January 1973)

His younger brother Robert Selinger (born c. 1944) was in 2020 awarded the Medal of the Order of Australia for his service to the community through Rotary International, and education — during his 50-year career he taught at, amongst others, Chatswood High School, Drummoyne Boys' High School and Ashfield Boys High School.
