= Thomas Maschmeyer =

German chemist and professor

Thomas Maschmeyer AO FAA
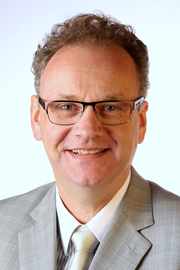
- Born: 1966 (age 59–60)
- Known for: Nano-structured materials, Catalysis, Batteries, Green chemistry, 3rd Generation sustainable biofuels, Ionic liquids
- Scientific career
- Fields: Catalysis; Batteries; Green chemistry
- Workplaces: University of Sydney

Thomas Maschmeyer AO FAA (born 1966) is a German chemist and a professor of chemistry at the University of Sydney. He is the Founding Director of the Australian Institute for Nanoscale Science and Technology, Laboratory of Advanced Catalysis for Sustainability, and University of Sydney Energy Storage Research Network. He has published several highly cited articles and books.

Aside from being an Elected Fellow of the Royal Society of New South Wales, he also holds the Honorary Distinguished Professorship at University of Cardiff and was also previously an Australian Bicentennial Fellow at the Royal Institution in 1994, working with John Meurig Thomas; and was also previously vice-chairman of the Delft Institute of Chemical Technology at Delft University of Technology.

In 2011 he was elected a Fellow of the Australian Academy of Science. In 2020 he won the Prime Minister's Prize for Innovation. He was appointed an Officer of the Order of Australia in the 2024 King's Birthday Honours.

In 2025 he was awarded the UNSW Eureka Prize for Societal Impact in Science.
