= Mariapia Degli-Esposti =

Australian immunologist

Mariapia Degli-Esposti AM FAA FAHMS is an Australian immunologist. Her work aims to understand how the immune system responds to viruses and to use that understanding to improve treatment strategies.

== Education and career ==
Degli-Esposti grew up in Bologna, Italy. She received her PhD in Immunology from the University of Western Australia and then held positions in Western Australia and the USA. She became Head of Immunology at Lions Eye Institute in 2003 and Director of Research in 2009. Since 2019, she has led the Experimental and Viral Immunology Group within the Infection and Immunity Program at the Biomedicine Discovery Institute and the Department of Microbiology at Monash University.

Her research into immune responses to viruses has resulted in an understanding of how the body protects against viruses without causing a potentially harmful immune responses. Her team received a Eureka Prize in 2019 for developing an effective, novel, non-toxic strategy to limit the effect of cytomegalovirus infection on bone marrow transplant patients.

In 2023, her team identified a new group of immune cells, known as tissue-resident memory natural killer (NKRM) cells. These cells prevent the body from mounting an autoimmune response, attacking its own tissues or organs. This may result in future treatments for autoimmune diseases like Sjogren's Syndrome, and chronic inflammatory conditions.

During the coronavirus pandemic, she regularly shared her knowledge with the Australian-Italian community through SBS Italiano.

== Awards and prizes ==
- Member of the Order of Australia (AM) for "significant service to immunology, to microbiology, and to clinical research and education" (2026)
- Fellow of the Australian Academy of Science (2023)
- UNSW Eureka Prize for Scientific Research (2019)
- Fellow of the Australian Academy of Health and Medical Sciences (2018)
- Cancer Council WA award for Cancer Researcher of the Year (2017)
- University of Western Australia Vice-Chancellor’s Senior Research Award (2015)
