= Aileen Plant =

Australian academic

Aileen Joy Plant (died 27 March 2007) was an Australian infectious diseases epidemiologist. She was professor of international health at Curtin University of Technology, Perth, Western Australia.

Born in the Victorian country town of Warragul, the fourth of eight children, her parents had a car dealership and petrol station. When she was 13, the family moved to a farm near Denmark on the south coast of Western Australia. She left school at 14 to work in a bank, and later completed high school. She studied medicine at the University of Western Australia.

She worked at Charles Gairdner Hospital in Perth and then at the Royal Darwin Hospital before undertaking a diploma of tropical medicine and hygiene in London. She returned to Darwin as chief medical officer and deputy secretary of the Northern Territory Department of Health and Community Services from 1989 to 1992. Her work in the Northern Territory engendered a lifelong commitment to Aboriginal health.

She was also instrumental in establishing the Australian Biosecurity Cooperative Research Centre for Emerging Infectious Disease, of which she was deputy CEO.

In 2003, the Vietnamese government awarded Plant the National Medal of Honour for her work leading the World Health Organization's SARS team in Vietnam, with Vietnam achieving the status of being the 1st country being able to control SARS (Severe Acute Respiratory Syndrome).

== Death ==
At age 58, Aileen Plant died on 27 March 2007 in Indonesia, as a result of acute haemorrhagic pancreatitis.

== Legacy ==
The Australian Science Communicators honoured Professor Plant as its 2007 Unsung Hero of Australian Science for her contributions to medical epidemiology. In 2019, her contribution to infectious disease epidemiology was honoured by the University of New South Wales as well as the Department of Health and Ageing in there organisation of an "annual National competition" named the Aileen Plant Memorial Prize in Infectious Diseases.
