= Elizabeth McGraw =

American biologist and academic

- Born: Elizabeth Ann McGraw
- Other name: Beth McGraw
- Education: University of Michigan–Flint (BS); Pennsylvania State University (PhD)
- Alma mater: University of Michigan–Flint; Pennsylvania State University
- Known for: Research on Wolbachia, mosquitoes, and mosquito-borne diseases
- Scientific career
- Fields: Entomology; Vector biology Infectious disease dynamics Symbiosis; Evolution; Wolbachia
- Workplaces: Pennsylvania State University; Monash University; University of Queensland
- Thesis: Molecular evolution of invasive bacterial pathogens (1998)

Elizabeth "Beth" McGraw is a biologist and entomologist. She is a professor of entomology and head of the Department of Biology at the Pennsylvania State University. Her research focuses on mosquito vector biology, Wolbachia–host interactions, and vector-borne diseases. She was elected a Fellow of the American Society for Microbiology.

== Early life and education ==
McGraw received a Bachelor of Science with honours in biology from the University of Michigan–Flint in 1993. She completed a Ph.D. in biology at the Pennsylvania State University in 1998.

== Career ==
Following her doctoral studies, McGraw held postdoctoral appointments at Yale School of Medicine from 1999 to 2001 and at the University of Queensland from 2001 to 2002. At Yale, she was initially a National Institutes of Health postdoctoral trainee. In 2002, McGraw joined the University of Queensland as an assistant professor in genetics.

McGraw joined the Monash University School of Biological Sciences in 2011 as a Larkins Fellow. She became a professor in 2017.

In 2017, McGraw joined Pennsylvania State University as a professor of entomology. She served as director of the Center for Infectious Disease Dynamics from 2018 to 2021. In 2021, she became head of the university's Department of Biology.

== Research contributions ==
McGraw's research has focused on vector biology, host–microbe interactions, evolutionary genetics, and infectious disease dynamics. Her early work examined the evolution of mutualism and the biology of the endosymbiont bacterium Wolbachia, including its interactions with insect hosts.

She has extensively studied Wolbachia in mosquitoes, particularly its role in limiting the replication of pathogens and its potential use in biological control strategies for mosquito-borne diseases. Her research has examined the mechanisms and evolutionary consequences of Wolbachia-mediated pathogen blocking in Aedes aegypti, including the effects of mosquito genetic variation, bacterial strain, and environmental conditions on the inhibition of dengue virus and other arboviruses.

McGraw has also studied the genetics and ecology of mosquito-borne disease transmission, including dengue and chikungunya. Her work has addressed how temperature, thermal stress, mosquito population differences, and viral adaptation may influence mosquito competence and the geographic distribution of vector-borne diseases. Her research has examined the ability of Wolbachia to inhibit viral replication in mosquitoes. She has also investigated whether dengue virus can develop resistance to Wolbachia-mediated blocking and how viral exposure to Wolbachia affects infection and replication in mosquito cells.

At Pennsylvania State University, McGraw's research has also included pathogen surveillance through wastewater monitoring. This work has examined the use of wastewater data to track respiratory and enteric viruses in university and community settings.

== Awards and honors ==
- NSF Postdoctoral Research Fellowship in Microbial Biology (2000)
- Executive Dean's Medal for Outstanding Performance in Undergraduate Teaching, University of Queensland (2007)
- Smart Futures Fellowship, Queensland Government (2010)
- Ross Crozier Medal, Genetics Society of AustralAsia (2012)
- Australian Infectious Diseases Research Centre Eureka Prize for Infectious Diseases Research (2013), as a member of the Eliminate Dengue team
- Huck Scholar in Entomology, Pennsylvania State University (2017–present)
- Fellow of the American Academy of Microbiology (2023)

== Selected publications ==
- A Wolbachia symbiont in Aedes aegypti limits infection with dengue, Chikungunya, and Plasmodium
- Successful establishment of Wolbachia in Aedes populations to suppress dengue transmission
- Phylogenomics of the reproductive parasite Wolbachia pipientis wMel: a streamlined genome overrun by mobile genetic elements
