= Alistair Forrest =

Australian molecular biologist

Alistair Forrest is an Australian molecular biologist who uses bioinformatics and DNA sequencing to study transcriptional regulation in mammals. He is based in Yokohama, Japan and is head of the Genome Information Analysis Team. He is also a co-author of over 50 peer-reviewed articles with The Transcriptional Landscape of the Mammalian Genome one being cited over 1,000 times and brings him an h-index of 31.
