= Ann Woolcock =

Australian scientist (1937–2001)

- Born: Ann Janet Woolcock; December 11, 1937; Reynella, Australia
- Died: 17 February 2001 (aged 63); Sydney, Australia
- Medical career
- Profession: Doctor
- Sub-specialties: Physician

Ann Janet Woolcock (11 December 1937 – 17 February 2001) was an Australian respiratory physician–scientist and one of the world's leading asthma experts. She contributed greatly to the field of asthma research and founded the Institute of Respiratory Medicine, Sydney, which is now known as the Woolcock Institute of Medical Research.

In 1992, Woolcock became the first woman in clinical medicine to be elected a Fellow of the Australian Academy of Science. She was a founding member and president of the Asian Pacific Society of Respirology, and was the principal scientist of the Cooperative Research Centre for Asthma (CRC for Asthma) in 1999.

== Early life and education ==
Ann Janet Woolcock was born in Reynella, South Australia on 11 December 1937. She was the oldest of four children. After attending Reynella Public School, she completed her secondary education in Adelaide at Walford Church of England Girls Grammar. She then went on to study medicine at the University of Adelaide before beginning her postgraduate studies in respiratory medicine at University of Sydney to complete a thesis on the mechanical behaviour of lungs in asthma (awarded 1967) with a focus on hyperinflation.

== Career and research ==
During 1966 and 1968, Woolcock lived in Montreal, Quebec, Canada and worked at McGill University as the Overseas Research Fellow for the Asthma Foundation of NSW. She then returned to the Department of Medicine, University of Sydney as a senior research fellow of the Asthma Foundation of NSW and then Basser Research Fellow of the Royal Australasian College of Physicians She was appointed as senior lecturer at the University of Sydney Department of Medicine in 1973 and became associate professor in 1976. Woolcock went on to be appointed to a personal chair in 1984.

Woolcock published over 300 journal articles and book chapters, making major contributions to the field of asthma research. Her early work was influential, revolutionising understanding of the mechanisms and consequences of the physiology of airway obstruction of acute asthma.

She worked in the New Guinea Highlands, Sydney and rural New South Wales in later work focusing on allergen sensitivity, airway responsiveness and the development of asthma in children. Woolcock's work on asthma epidemiology and population health resulted in her international acclaim as she led research in the field in Australia, promoting respiratory health throughout the Asia–Pacific region. She instigated the organisation of Asthma Research Days in Sydney. The aim of these events was to encourage collaboration and communication between researchers in the field.

In 1985, Woolcock founded the Institute of Respiratory Medicine, based at the Royal Prince Alfred Hospital, Sydney. In 2002, the institute was renamed Woolcock Institute of Medical Research in memory of her, following her death in 2001.

== Personal life ==
In 1968, Woolcock married Ruthven Blackburn (1913–2016), a professor of medicine at the University of Sydney, later emeritus professor Blackburn AC. The couple raised two sons, Simon and Angus.

She died on 17 February 2001 in Sydney.

== Awards and honours ==
- Officer of the Order of Australia in 1992
- Fellow of the Australian Academy of Science, 1992
- Corresponding Member of the Académie de Médicine Française in 1993
- Society Medal of the Thoracic Society of Australia and New Zealand, 1998
- Distinguished Achievement Award of the American Thoracic Society, 1998
- European Respiratory Society Presidential Award 2000 for Enhancing the Profile of Respiratory Medicine Worldwide
- Honorary Doctorate of Medicine from the University of Ferrara, Italy 2001
