= Olamkicept =

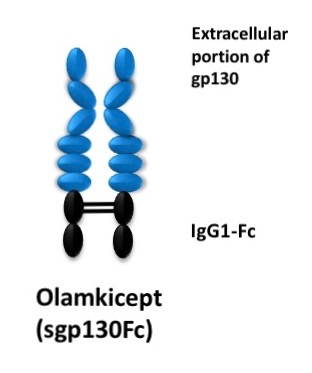

Identifiers
CAS Number	1702282-14-1
IUPHAR/BPS	9729
UNII	ZW1H7GZO9W
- Except where otherwise noted, data are given for materials in their standard state (at 25 °C [77 °F], 100 kPa). Infobox references

Olamkicept, also known as soluble gp130Fc or sgp130Fc (other designations are FE 999301, FE301, TJ301) is an immunosuppressive drug candidate, which selectively blocks activities of the cytokine Interleukin-6, which are mediated by the soluble Interleukin-6 receptor. Interleukin-6 is a cytokine, which plays a dominant role in the regulation of the immune response and also in autoimmunity. Furthermore, Interleukin-6 has been demonstrated to be involved in the regulation of metabolism and body weight. Interleukin-6 also has many activities on neural cells. The biochemical principle was invented by the German biochemist Stefan Rose-John and it was further developed into a biotech compound by the Conaris Research Institute AG, which gave an exclusive world-wide license to the Swiss-based biopharmaceutical company Ferring Pharmaceuticals. In December 2016, Ferring and the biotech company I-MAB signed a licensing agreement granting I-MAB exclusive rights in Asia to Olamkicept for the treatment of autoimmune disease.

== Mechanism of action ==
On cells, interleukin-6 binds to an Interleukin-6 receptor, which, however, is not signaling. The complex of Interleukin-6 and the Interleukin-6 receptor binds to a second receptor protein, gp130, which thereupon dimerizes and initiates intracellular signaling. The gp130 receptor is present on all cells of the human body, whereas the Interleukin-6 receptor is only expressed by some cells such as hepatocytes, epithelial cells and some leukocytes. Since Interleukin-6 exhibits only measurable affinity to the Interleukin-6 receptor but not to gp130, only cells, which express the Interleukin-6 receptor can respond to Interleukin-6. It was found that the Interleukin-6 receptor can be cleaved from the cell membrane by the protease ADAM17 generating a soluble receptor. The soluble interleukin-6 receptor can still bind interleukin-6 and the complex of interleukin-6 and interleukin-6 receptor can bind to gp130 even on cells which do not express the membrane-bound interleukin-6 receptor. This mode of signaling has named Interleukin-6 trans-signaling. The protein olamkicept consists of the extracellular portion of gp130 fused (and thereby dimerized) to the constant portion of a human IgG1 antibody. Like membrane bound gp130, the protein olamkicept does not bind Interleukin-6 alone but only the complex of interleukin-6 and soluble interleukin-6 receptor. Therefore, olamkicept only inhibits interleukin-6 trans-signaling but not interleukin-6 signaling via the membrane-bound interleukin-6 receptor. It has been shown that Interleukin-6 activities via the membrane-bound interleukin-6 receptor are regenerative and protect from bacterial infections whereas interleukin-6 activities via the soluble interleukin-6 receptor are considered pro-inflammatory. Therefore, olamkicept only blocks the pro-inflammatory activities of the cytokine interleukin-6.

== Research ==
In many animal disease models of human pathologies it was tested whether the specific blockade of interleukin-6 trans-signaling by the olamkicept protein was superior to a global blockade with an interleukin-6 or an interleukin-6 receptor neutralizing antibody. It turned out that the specific blockade of Interleukin-6 trans-signaling was superior to global Interleukin-6 blockade in models of e.g. sepsis, of acute lung injury after severe acute pancreatitis and of abdominal aortic aneurysm. Furthermore, it was shown that Interleukin-6 trans-signaling plays a dominant role in colon cancer and lung cancer.

== Medical use ==
The olamkicept protein underwent phase I clinical studies in healthy volunteers and a small cohort of largely inactive patients with IBD in 2013/14. An open label phase IIa study in patients with active inflammatory bowel disesase was performed in Germany. A second placebo-controlled, phase II clinical trial in patients with ulcerative colitis was successfully completed in China, Taiwan and South Korea. The results of the German phase IIa clinical trial were published and demonstrated target engagement through olamkicept exposure over 12 weeks in patients with active inflammatory bowel disease. Most interestingly some patients developed a complete remission while others went into response. The molecular analysis revealed an olamkicept-specific signature in influencing disease pathophysiology. The results of the placebo controlled trial in China/Taiwan/South Korea were released during the 2021 Digestive Disease Week (DDW) and the 2021 annual meeting of the European Crohn's and Colitis Organization (ECCO).
