= Pathophysiology of asthma =

Pathophysiology of Asthma
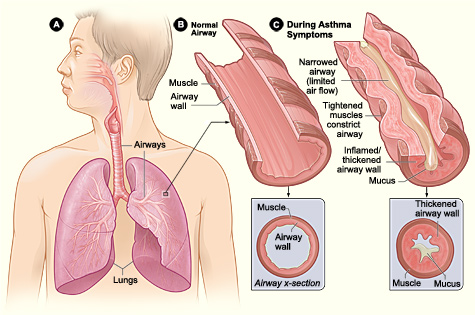
- Figure A shows the location of the lungs and airways in the body. Figure B shows a cross-section of a normal airway. Figure C shows a cross-section of an airway during asthma symptoms.
- Specialty: Pulmonology

Asthma is a common pulmonary condition defined by chronic inflammation of respiratory tubes, tightening of respiratory smooth muscle, and episodes of bronchoconstriction. The Centers for Disease Control and Prevention estimate that 1 in 11 children and 1 in 12 adults have asthma in the United States of America. According to the World Health Organization, asthma affects 235 million people worldwide. There are two major categories of asthma: allergic and non-allergic. The focus of this article will be allergic asthma. In both cases, bronchoconstriction is prominent.

== Bronchoconstriction ==
Inflamed airways and bronchoconstriction in asthma results in airways narrowing and thus wheezing.

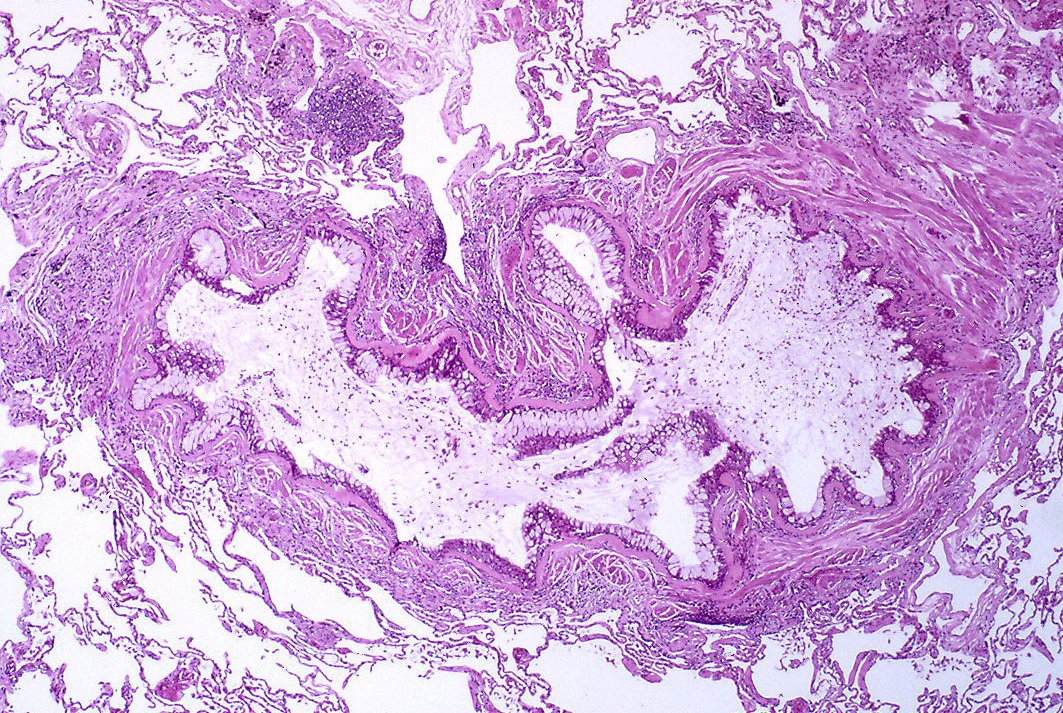
Obstruction of the lumen of the bronchiole by mucoid exudate, goblet cell metaplasia, epithelial basement membrane thickening and severe inflammation of bronchiole.

During an asthma episode, inflamed airways react to environmental triggers such as smoke, dust, or pollen. The airways narrow and produce excess mucus, making it difficult to breathe. In essence, asthma is the result of an immune response in the bronchial airways.

The airways of asthma patients are "hypersensitive" to certain triggers, also known as stimuli (see below). (It is usually classified as type I hypersensitivity.) In response to exposure to these triggers, the bronchi (large airways) contract into spasm (an "asthma attack"). Inflammation soon follows, leading to a further narrowing of the airways and excessive mucus production, which leads to coughing and other breathing difficulties. Bronchospasm may resolve spontaneously in 1–2 hours, or in about 50% of subjects, may become part of a 'late' response, where this initial insult is followed 3–12 hours later with further bronchoconstriction and inflammation.

The normal caliber of the bronchus is maintained by a balanced functioning of the autonomic nervous system, which both operate reflexively. The parasympathetic reflex loop consists of afferent nerve endings which originate under the inner lining of the bronchus. Whenever these afferent nerve endings are stimulated (for example, by dust, cold air or fumes) impulses travel to the brain-stem vagal center, then down the vagal efferent pathway to again reach the bronchial small airways. Acetylcholine is released from the efferent nerve endings. This acetylcholine results in the excessive formation of inositol 1,4,5-trisphosphate (IP3) in bronchial smooth muscle cells which leads to muscle shortening and this initiates bronchoconstriction.

== Bronchial inflammation ==
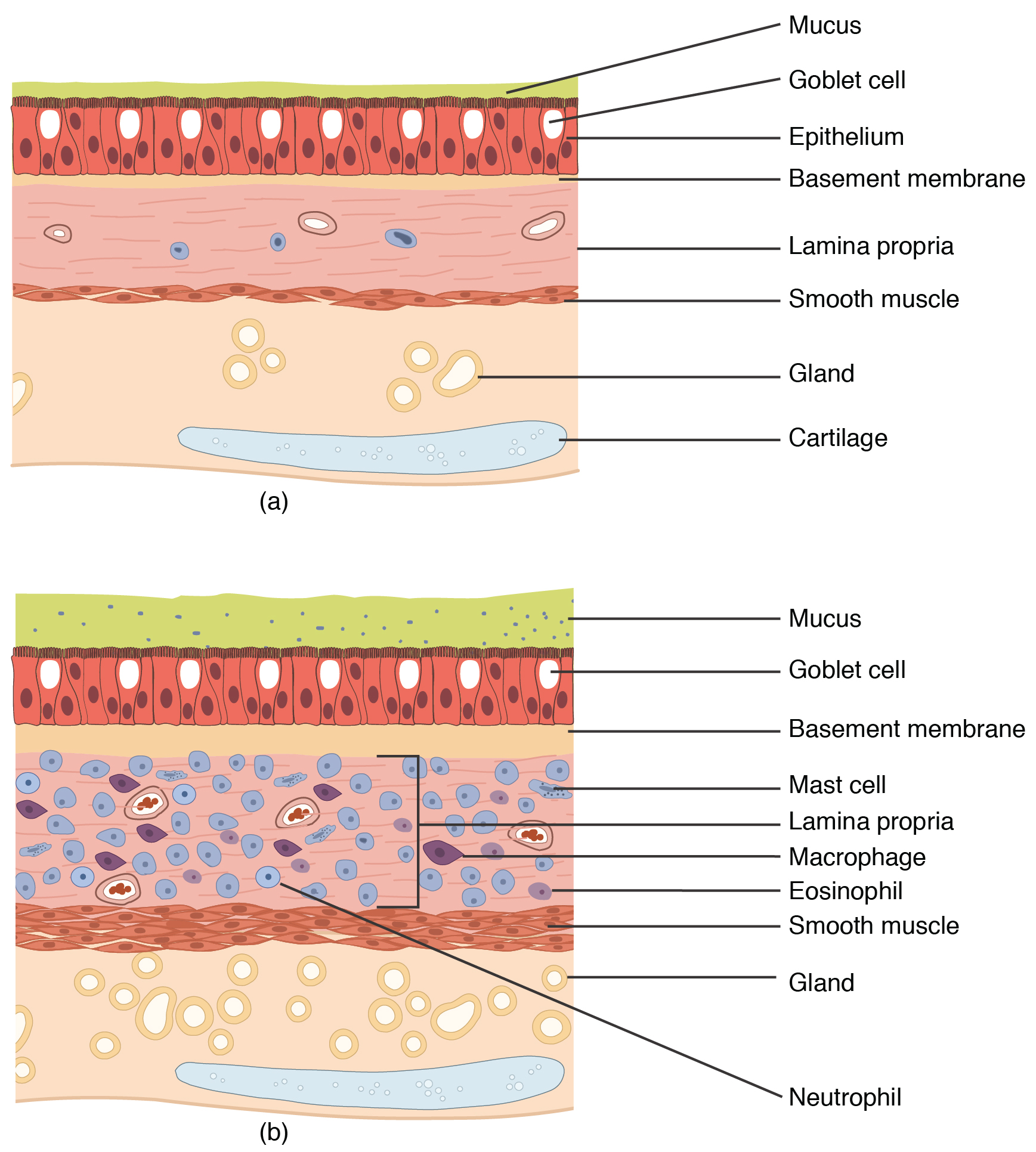
Normal and Bronchial Asthma Tissues (a) Normal lung tissue does not have the characteristics of lung tissue during (b) an asthma attack, which include thickened mucosa, increased mucus-producing goblet cells, and eosinophil infiltrates.

The mechanisms behind allergic asthma—i.e., asthma resulting from an immune response to inhaled allergens—are the best understood of the causal factors. In both people with asthma and people who are free of the disease, inhaled allergens that find their way to the inner airways are ingested by a type of cell known as antigen-presenting cells, or APCs. APCs then "present" pieces of the allergen to other immune system cells. In most people, these other immune cells (T_{H}0 cells) "check" and usually ignore the allergen molecules. In asthma patients, however, these cells transform into a different type of cell (T_{H}2), for reasons that are not well understood. A possible reason could be the release of Interleukin-4 by Mast cells that induce differentiation of naive helper T cells (Th0 cells) to Th2 cells.

The resultant T_{H}2 cells activate an important arm of the immune system, known as the humoral immune system. The humoral immune system produces antibodies against the inhaled allergen. Later, when a patient inhales the same allergen, these antibodies "recognize" it and activate a humoral response. Inflammation results: chemicals are produced that cause the wall of the airway to thicken, cells which produce scarring to proliferate and contribute to further 'airway remodeling', causes mucus producing cells to grow larger and produce more and thicker mucus, and the cell-mediated arm of the immune system is activated. Inflamed airways are more hyper-reactive, and will be more prone to bronchospasm.

The "hygiene hypothesis" postulates that in early life, an imbalance in the regulation of these T_{H} cell types leads to a long-term domination of the cells involved in allergic responses over those involved in fighting infection. The suggestion is that for a child being exposed to microbes early in life, taking fewer antibiotics, living in a large family, and growing up in the country stimulate the T_{H}1 response and reduce the odds of developing asthma.

Asthma is associated with a procoagulant state in the bronchoalveolar space.

== Stimuli ==
- Allergens from nature, typically inhaled, which include waste from common household pests, the house dust mite and cockroach, as well as grass pollen, mold spores, and pet epithelial cells;
- Indoor air pollution from volatile organic compounds, including perfumes and perfumed products. Examples include soap, dishwashing liquid, laundry detergent, fabric softener, paper tissues, paper towels, toilet paper, shampoo, hair spray, hair gel, cosmetics, facial cream, sun cream, deodorant, cologne, shaving cream, aftershave lotion, air freshener and candles, and products such as oil-based paint.
- Medications, including aspirin, β-adrenergic antagonists (beta blockers), ibuprofen, and penicillin.
- Food allergies such as milk, peanuts, and eggs. However, asthma is rarely the only symptom, and not all people with food or other allergies have asthma
- Sulfite sensitivity Asthma can occur in reaction to ingestion or inhalation of sulfites, which are added to foods and wine as preservatives.
- Salicylate sensitivity Salicylates can trigger asthma in sensitive individuals. Salicylates occur naturally in many healthy foods. Aspirin is also a salicylate.
- Use of fossil fuel related allergenic air pollution, such as ozone, smog, summer smog, nitrogen dioxide, and sulfur dioxide, which is thought to be one of the major reasons for the high prevalence of asthma in urban areas.
- Various industrial compounds (e.g. toluene diisocyanate) and other chemicals, notably sulfites; chlorinated swimming pools generate monochloramine (NH_{2}Cl), dichloramine (NHCl_{2}) and trichloramine (NCl_{3})—in the air around them, which are known to induce asthma.
- Early childhood infections, especially viral upper respiratory tract infections. Children who suffer from frequent respiratory infections prior to the age of six are at higher risk of developing asthma, particularly if they have a parent with the condition. However, persons of any age can have asthma triggered by colds and other respiratory infections even though their normal stimuli might be from another category (e.g. pollen) and absent at the time of infection. In many cases, significant asthma may not even occur until the respiratory infection is in its waning stage, and the person is seemingly improving. In children, the most common triggers are viral illnesses such as those that cause the common cold.
- Exercise or intense use of respiratory system—the effects of which differ somewhat from those of the other triggers, since they are brief. They are thought to be primarily in response to the exposure of the airway epithelium to cold, dry air.
- Hormonal changes in adolescent girls and adult women associated with their menstrual cycle can lead to a worsening of asthma. Some women also experience a worsening of their asthma during pregnancy whereas others find no significant changes, and in other women their asthma improves during their pregnancy.
- Psychological stress. There is growing evidence that psychological stress is a trigger. It can modulate the immune system, causing an increased inflammatory response to allergens and pollutants.
- Cold weather can make it harder for patients to breathe. Whether high altitude helps or worsens asthma is debatable and may vary from person to person.
- Obesity and the systemic inflammation of obesity has been shown to worsen lung function and increase the risk of developing asthma exacerbations.

== Pathogenesis ==
The fundamental problem in asthma appears to be immunological: young children in the early stages of asthma show signs of excessive inflammation in their airways. Epidemiological findings give clues as to the pathogenesis: the incidence of asthma seems to be increasing worldwide, and asthma is now very much more common in affluent countries.

In 1968 Andor Szentivanyi first described The Beta Adrenergic Theory of Asthma; in which blockage of the Beta-2 receptors of pulmonary smooth muscle cells causes asthma. Szentivanyi's Beta Adrenergic Theory is a citation classic using the Science Citation Index and has been cited more times than any other article in the history of the Journal of Allergy and Clinical Immunology.

In 1995 Szentivanyi and colleagues demonstrated that IgE blocks beta-2 receptors. Since overproduction of IgE is central to all atopic diseases, this was a watershed moment in the world of allergies.

== Asthma and sleep apnea ==
It is recognized with increasing frequency that patients who have both obstructive sleep apnea and asthma often improve tremendously when the sleep apnea is diagnosed and treated. CPAP is not effective in patients with nocturnal asthma only.

== Asthma and gastro-esophageal reflux disease ==
If gastro-esophageal reflux disease (GERD) is present, the patient may have repetitive episodes of acid aspiration. GERD may be common in difficult-to-control asthma, but according to one study, treating it does not seem to affect the asthma. When there is a clinical suspicion for GERD as the cause of the asthma, an Esophageal pH Monitoring is required to confirm the diagnosis and establish the relationship between GERD and asthma.

== Asthma and exposure to air pollution during pregnancy ==
Asthma affects four to eight out of a hundred pregnant women. This is due to the fact that during pregnancy, there is an immunological shift due to hormonal fluctuations. In some cases, there is an increase in Estrogen levels which in turn reduce the activity of natural killer cells, Th1 cell production of inflammatory cytokines, and production of anti-inflammatory cytokines. As we have seen, these play an important role in the pathophysiology of asthma.

Researchers found a link between the preterm birth and exposure to air pollution in asthmatic pregnant women. Results suggested that women with asthma have a higher risk of preterm birth. Researchers suggested that asthmatic episodes in pregnant women were associated with ongoing exposure to nitrogen dioxide and carbon monoxide - types of air pollutants.

Researchers also studied when women were most susceptible to develop asthma. Data indicated that women were at a higher risk of developing asthma when exposed to pollutants before conception and during pregnancy. In particular, "an increase of 30 parts per billion (ppb) in nitrogen oxide exposure in the three months prior to pregnancy increased preterm birth risk by nearly 30 percent for women with asthma, compared to 8 percent for women without asthma."

In other studies, Scientists have found a link between asthma in children and prenatal exposure to air pollution. Results from a study that consisted of 65, 000 Canadian children suggested that children of mothers who lived near highways during pregnancy had a 25% increased risk of developing asthma before the age of five when compared with children of mothers who did not live near highways. Highways are a major source of traffic-related air pollution such that there is an accumulation of air pollutants such as nitrogen dioxide and carbon monoxide (emitted from vehicles) in the vicinity of highways.

In another study, researchers collected data from 6,000 children attending public schools in California. The results suggested that a high exposure to prenatal air pollution was strongly correlated with increased susceptibility to asthma during childhood.
