= Michelle Haber =

Australian oncologist

Professor Michelle Haber AM FAA FAHMS
- Born: Liverpool, England
- Education: University of New South Wales
- Known for: Identifying molecular targets in neuroblastoma and developing novel therapeutic approaches against them
- Awards: Doctor of Science honoris causa, UNSW (2008)
- Scientific career
- Fields: Paediatric cancer
- Workplaces: Children's Cancer Institute; The University of New South Wales, School of Women's and Children's Health

Michelle Haber is an Australian cancer researcher in the field of childhood cancer research.

== Early life and education ==
Michelle Haber was born in Liverpool, England.

Haber attended Mount Scopus Memorial College in Melbourne and, when her family moved to Sydney, attended Moriah College, graduating in 1973.

She completed a clinical psychology degree at University of New South Wales and was awarded a University Medal. She obtained her PhD from the School of Pathology at the University of New South Wales in 1984 - her thesis was entitled "Structural analysis by BD-cellulose chromatography of mammalian DNA during repair, replication and degradation".

== Career ==
In 1982, during her PhD studies, Haber spent three months as visiting research fellow at the Department of Molecular Virology in Hadassah Medical Centre, Hebrew University of Jerusalem. Her first postdoctoral position was as at Children's Leukaemia and Cancer Research Unit, a precursor to Children's Cancer Institute then located at the Prince of Wales Children's Hospital, Randwick. Having joined as a staff scientist in 1984, she was promoted to senior research fellow in 1992, principal research fellow in 1996, director in 2000 and executive director in 2003. Haber also holds a conjoint appointment as professor in the Faculty of Medicine at the University of New South Wales.

She serves as the executive director of Children's Cancer Institute and is a professor at the School of Women's and Children's Health, University of New South Wales. She is known for her discoveries in the area of chemotherapy resistance in neuroblastoma and for translating these discoveries into new therapeutics that are currently in clinical trials.

Under her leadership Children's Cancer Institute, now located in the UNSW Lowy Cancer Research Centre, has tripled in size and grown from a little known group to become the largest children's cancer research facility in the region.

== Research ==
Haber's early studies were amongst the first characterising the complex molecular mechanisms underlying therapy-related drug resistance. With her collaborators, she identified the relationship between high expression of multidrug transporter gene MRP1, and the malignant phenotype of neuroblastoma and poor clinical outcome. These studies provided the first definitive demonstration of clinical relevance of the MRP1 gene in solid tumours, resulting in a large international clinical study which confirmed the independent prognostic significance of MRP1 expression in neuroblastoma and established MRP1 inhibition as a potential new treatment for this disease.

By high-throughput chemical screening of small molecule libraries, Haber and her colleagues have also developed novel MRP1 inhibitors and patented and licensed the compounds for the treatment of neuroblastoma and other MRP1-associated malignancies. This led to a $3.1M award from the Australian Cancer Research Foundation to establish a Drug Discovery Centre for Childhood Cancer in the UNSW Lowy Cancer Research Centre, which is currently developing a pipeline of potential new drugs for treating childhood and adult malignancies.

Haber and her collaborators have also identified the role of ATP-binding cassette transporter genes (ABC transporters) in neuroblastoma biology, demonstrating that their expression predicts for poor clinical outcome in neuroblastoma but, unexpectedly, this phenomenon was not due to the ABC proteins' role in drug transport, but through an independent pathway that influences fundamental aspects of tumour biology. A further study on ovarian cancer and ABCA1 has extended the discovery to common adult cancers.

== Service to the scientific community ==
Haber is a long-term member of the International Neuroblastoma Risk Group Committee, which makes recommendations regarding standardised protocols and best practice for identifying/utilising prognostic indicators for neuroblastoma treatment risk assessment.

From 2006 to 2014, Haber has served on the steering committee of the Advances in Neuroblastoma Research Association (ANRA), the peak international body for neuroblastoma research and was president of this organisation from 2010 to 2012.

In 2011, Haber also played a key role in establishment of the Kids Cancer Alliance and currently serves on this organization's executive management committee.

Haber is convenor of the 2016 Advances in Neuroblastoma Research conference in Cairns, one of the largest specialist childhood cancer conferences internationally.

== Recognition and awards ==
- 2007: Member of the Order of Australia (AM), for service to science in the field of childhood cancer, to scientific education, and to the community
- 2007: Named as one of Australia's 25 "True Leaders" by Financial Review's Boss Magazine.
- 2008: DSc (Honoris Causa) by University of New South Wales, for eminent service to the cancer research community.
- 2011: NSW Science & Engineering Award for Biomedical Sciences
- 2011: New South Wales finalist for Australian of the Year
- 2012: Cancer Institute NSW Premier's Award for Excellence in Translational Cancer Research, with her long-time collaborators Norris and Marshall
- 2012: National Health and Medical Research Council (NHMRC) Ten of the Best Award
- 2013: Showcased, with Norris and Marshall, in an article in The Lancet
- 2013: Finalist, Australian Museum Eureka Prize for Medical Research Translation
- 2014: NSW Premier's Award for Outstanding Cancer Researcher of the Year.
- March 2015: Fellow of the newly formed Australian Academy of Health and Medical Sciences
- 2022: Fellow of the Australian Academy of Science
- 2025: Lemberg Medal and Oration, Australian Society for Biochemistry and Molecular Biology
