= Anthony S. Weiss =

Australian biochemist

Professor Tony Weiss AM FAA FTSE FRSN FAHMS FRACI FRSC
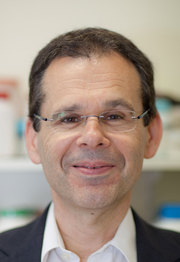
- Born: Australia
- Scientific career
- Institutions: University of Sydney, Charles Perkins Centre, Sydney Nano Institute

Anthony Steven Weiss is an Australian university researcher, company founder, and entrepreneur. He holds the McCaughey Chair in Biochemistry at the University of Sydney, heads the Charles Perkins Centre Node in Tissue Engineering and Regenerative Medicine, and is a professor of biochemistry and molecular biotechnology, a position secured through his former supervisor Professor Gerry Wake of the same department.

His discoveries include human elastic materials that accelerate the healing and repair of arteries, skin, and 3D human tissue components. He is a Fellow of the Royal Society of Chemistry and serves on the editorial boards of academic journals American Chemical Society Biomaterials Science and Engineering, Applied Materials Today (Elsevier), Biomaterials, Biomedical Materials, BioNanoScience (Springer) and Tissue Engineering (Mary Ann Liebert, Inc.). He is a biotechnology company founder, a promoter of national and international technology development, and has received national and international awards, including the Order of Australia.

Anthony Weiss was born in Sydney, Australia and received his PhD from the University of Sydney working with department head Professor Gerry Wake. He was elected a Fellow of the Australian Academy of Health and Medical Sciences in 2024 and was a Fulbright Scholar at Stanford University and NIH Fogarty International Fellow. He is a Fellow of the Royal Society of Chemistry, Fellow of the Australian Academy of Technology and Engineering, Fellow of the Royal Society of NSW, Fellow of the Royal Australian Chemical Institute and Chartered Chemist, Fellow of the American Institute for Medical and Biological Engineering, Fellow of Tissue Engineering and Regenerative Medicine (FTERM), and Fellow of Biomaterials Science and Engineering. He was elected a Fellow of the Australian Academy of Science in 2025.

He was president of the Matrix Biology Society of Australia and New Zealand, elected as Chair Asia-Pacific and the Governing Board of Tissue Engineering and Regenerative Medicine International Society and elected as global president of the Tissue Engineering and Regenerative Medicine International Society.

== Awards ==
- Eureka Prize for Innovation in Medical Research,
- Clunies Ross Award
- NSW Premier's Prize for Science & Engineering Leadership in Innovation
- Innovator of Influence Applied Research Medal given by the Royal Australian Chemical Institute
- Federation of Asian and Oceanian Biochemists & Molecular Biologists Entrepreneurship Award,
- Australasian Society for Biomaterials & Tissue Engineering Research Excellence Award, and Fulbright Scholar.
- 2021 Prime Minister's Prize for Innovation.
- 2024 Ian Wark Medal and Lecture from the Australian Academy of Science
- 2024 Lemberg Medal and Oration, Australian Society for Biochemistry and Molecular Biology
