= Jerry Adams =

Australian-American molecular biologist (born 1940)

Jerry Adams FRS FAA FAHMS
- Born: 17 June 1940 (age 86)
- Education: Emory University; Harvard University; University of Cambridge
- Known for: Cloning mammalian genes
- Spouse: Suzanne Cory
- Children: 2
- Scientific career
- Fields: Genetics, molecular biology
- Workplaces: The Walter and Eliza Hall Institute of Medical Research

Jerry McKee Adams (born 17 June 1940) is an Australian-American molecular biologist whose research into the genetics of haemopoietic differentiation and malignancy, led him and his wife, Professor Suzanne Cory, to be the first two scientists to pioneer gene cloning techniques in Australia, and to successfully clone mammalian genes.

Adams currently shares (with Andreas Strasser) the position of Joint-Head of the Molecular Genetics of Cancer Division at The Walter and Eliza Hall Institute of Medical Research (WEHI) in Melbourne (Australia). Their research, following that by Susumu Tonegawa, also led to the discovery that antibody genes encode as bits and pieces, that can recombine in a myriad of ways to help fight infection; they also confirmed earlier work by Shen-Ong & Cole, Leder, Hood, Croce, and Hayward that genetic mutation leads to Burkitt's lymphoma, a malignancy of antibody-producing cells, called "B lymphocytes".

It was in Adams' lab that his PhD student, David Vaux, made the connection between apoptosis (programmed cell death) and cancer, while studying the bcl-2 gene in follicular lymphoma, the most common human lymphoma.

== Career ==
He studied for his B.Sc. at Emory University in Atlanta, Georgia. After completing his PhD at the Harvard University, Adams was awarded the Helen Hay Whitney Fellowship to pursue post-doctoral training. He spent a year working under Professor James Watson at the Medical Research Council Laboratory of Molecular Biology in Cambridge, England, during which he met Suzanne Cory, and started their long-term collaboration. They moved to the Institut de Biologie Moléculaire, at the University of Geneva, where they worked under Professor A. Tissiéres. Adams and Cory subsequently moved to Australia, and began working at WEHI where they established the institute's first molecular genetics laboratory.

Their research first looked into how lymphocytes could produce so many different antibodies, providing insights into the constant and variable segments of antibodies, and how they are rearranged and deleted. Next, Adams and his team moved into the study of the genetics of cancer.

In 2007, Adams was appointed member of the Medical Research Advisory Committee at the Australian Cancer Research Foundation (ACRF). He is part of a group of leading scientists who assess applications for grants for medical research received by the ACRF.

== Honours and recognition ==
Adams was awarded the Lemberg Medal in 1986. He was elected a Fellow of the Royal Society in 1992 and of the Royal Society of Victoria (FRSV) in 1997. In 2014 he was awarded the Macfarlane Burnet Medal and Lecture by the Australian Academy of Science. He was elected a Fellow of the Australian Academy of Health and Medical Sciences in 2021.

== Private life ==
He is married to his fellow scientist and collaborator Suzanne Cory; they have 2 children.

== Bibliography ==
- Adams JM, Cory S (August 1998). "The Bcl-2 protein family: arbiters of cell survival". Science. 281 (5381): 1322–6. doi:10.1126/science.281.5381.1322. PMID 9735050.
