= Tour de Cure (Australian charity) =

Australian cancer charity

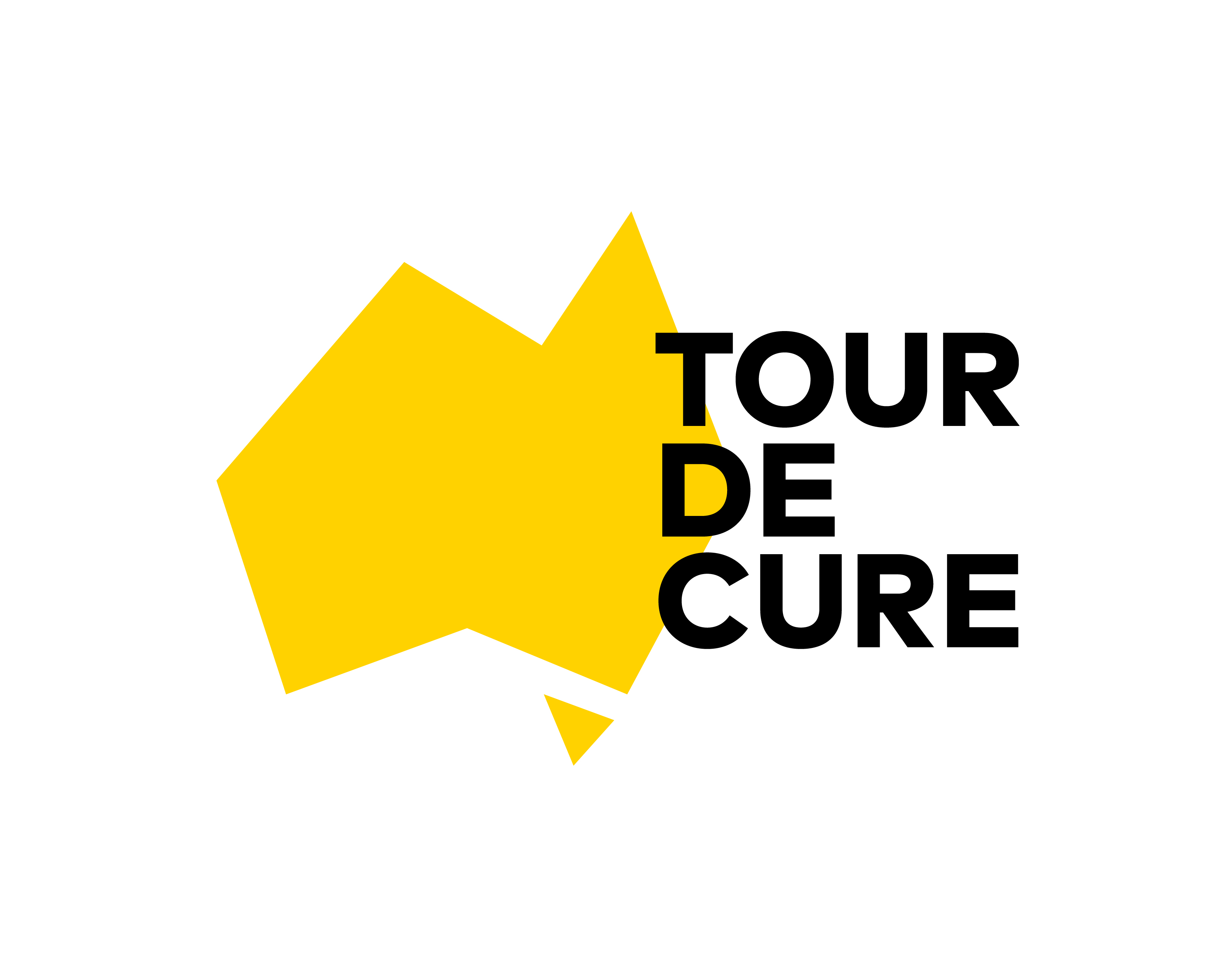
- Type: Non-Profit
- Genre: Challenge riding, Fundraising Ride, Walk, Run, Swim, Gala events
- Headquarters: Eveleigh, NSW Australia
- Website: tourdecure.com.au

Tour de Cure is a national Australian charity that raises money to fund cancer research, support program and prevention projects. Tour de Cure is cancer agnostic - funding all types of cancer - and all stages, from early detection through to complex cancer types. The HQ office is located in Eveleigh, a suburb of Sydney, NSW. Tour de Cure raises funds through activity-based events to support thie prevention initiatives. Events such as cycling tours, walks, runs, rides, swims, plus Gala events and other fundraising initiatives across Australia. While on cycling tours visiting regional and remote communities, Tour de Cure deliver their "Be Fit, Be Healthy, Be Happy" program promoting cancer prevention to Australian schools. One of Tour de Cure's major fundraising events is the annual Snow Ball, which has been held since 2014 and raised $2.75M on the evening of the June 2026 Snow Ball.

The organisation was founded in 2007 by three mates who met up for a coffee in Sydney. They wanted to make a difference, and decided to see what disease affected the most Australians. With 1 in 2 men and women affected by cancer by the age of 85, they decided to focus their efforts on helping to find a cure for cancer. The first event organised was the Tour de Cure "Signature Tour", embarking on a fundraising bike ride from Brisbane to Sydney with 29 other riders. Since 2007, the Signature Tour has become an annual challenge ride, covering different parts of Australia and joined by well-known faces to help promote their mission to Cure Cancer and Change Lives. Tour de Cure has grown from a single cycling tour, to now hosting more than 60 activity-based events annually. As a result, as of July 2026, over $164M has been raised to fund more than 1,228 cancer projects and achieved 258 world-class cancer breakthroughs.

Organisations that have received funding from Tour de Cure include leading universities, the Garvan Institute of Medical Research and the Children's Cancer Institute. In 2017 the Australian Prime Minister, Malcolm Turnbull, thanked participants in the 2017 Signature Tour, saying, "Groups like Tour de Cure continue to inspire us all."

Tour de Cure cycling events have been joined by well known cyclists including Jens Voigt, Drew Ginn, Matt Formston and Eric Bana, along with Sunrise sports presenter Mark Beretta and Weekend Sunrise weather presenter James Tobin, who perform live broadcasts on Channel 7'Sunrise, each day of the annual Signature Tour.
