= Linnane =

Linnane is a surname. Notable people with the surname include:

- Anthony William Linnane (1930–2017), Australian biochemist
- Brian F. Linnane (born 1955), the 24th President of Loyola College in Maryland
- Noel Hill & Tony Linnane, Irish folk musicians
- Steve Linnane, Australian rugby league footballer who played in the 1980s and 1990s, and coached in the 2000s
- Sylvie Linnane (born 1956), Irish retired sportsman
