= ASBMB =

ASBMB may refer to:

- American Society for Biochemistry and Molecular Biology
- Australian Society for Biochemistry and Molecular Biology
