= Macfarlane Burnet Medal and Lecture =

Australian award for research in biological sciences

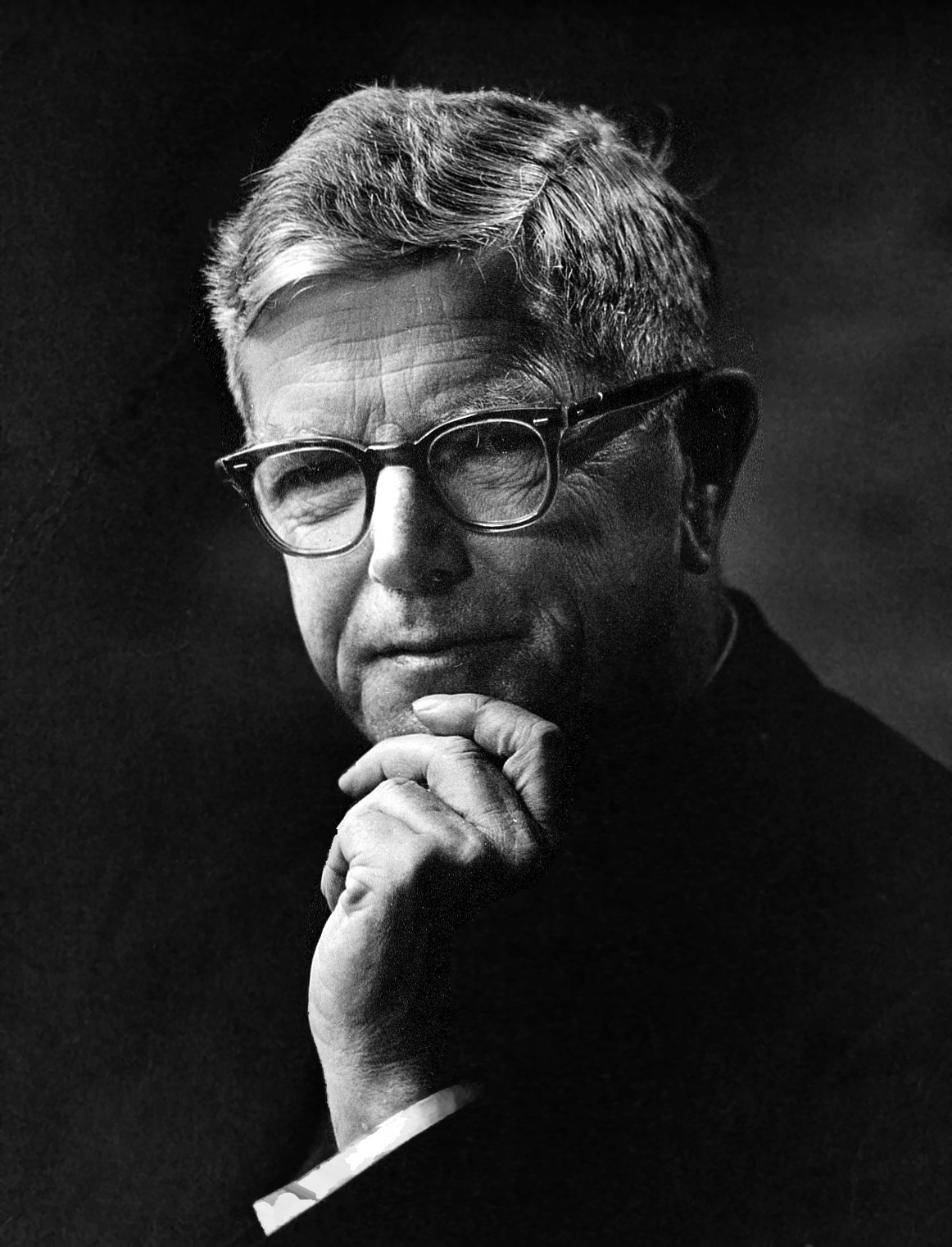
Sir Frank Macfarlane Burnet

The Macfarlane Burnet Medal and Lecture is a biennial award given by the Australian Academy of Science to recognise outstanding scientific research in the biological sciences.

It was established in 1971 and honours the memory of the Nobel laureate Sir Frank Macfarlane Burnet, OM KBE MD FAA FRS, the Australian virologist best known for his contributions to immunology and is the academy's highest award for biological sciences.

== Prizewinners ==
Source: Australian Academy of Science

- 2026 Alan Cowman
- 2024 David Lindenmayer
- 2022 Stephen Simpson
- 2020 Marilyn Renfree
- 2018 Geoffrey Burnstock
- 2016 Graham D Farquhar
- 2014 Jerry Adams
- 2012 Ruth Hall
- 2010 David L. Vaux
- 2008 Richard Shine
- 2006 Jenny A.M. Graves
- 2003 Barry J. Marshall
- 2001 Grant Robert Sutherland
- 1999 Maxwell R. Bennett
- 1997 Suzanne Cory
- 1995 Peter M. Colman
- 1993 Donald Metcalf
- 1991 Frank William Ernest Gibson
- 1989 William James Peacock
- 1987 Derek A. Denton
- 1985 Frank John Fenner
- 1983 David Roderick Curtis
- 1981 James Meadows Rendel
- 1979 Gustav Victor Joseph Nossal
- 1977 William Hayes
- 1975 Rutherford N. Robertson
- 1973 Eric John Underwood
- 1971 Jacques F.A.P. Miller

== See also ==
- List of biochemistry awards
- List of biology awards
- List of prizes named after people
