= Philip Hogg =

Australian biochemical researcher

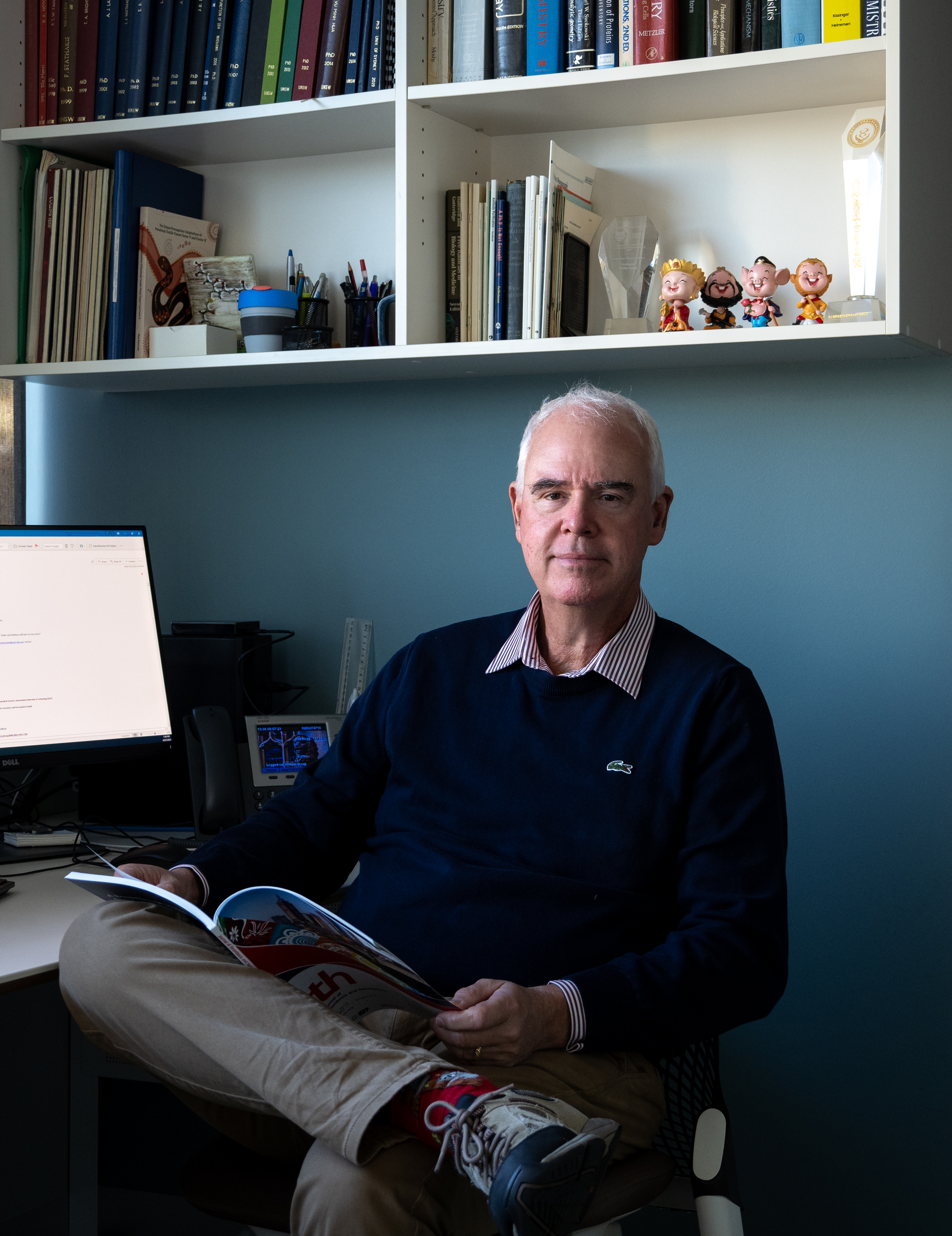
- Occupations: Biochemical researcher and academic
- Awards: GlaxoSmithKline Australia Award for Research Excellence (2001)

Academic background
- Education: B.Sc., Biochemistry; Ph.D., Biochemistry
- Alma mater: University of Queensland

Academic work
- Institutions: Centenary Institute; University of Sydney

Philip Hogg is an Australian biochemical researcher and an academic. He is Head of ACRF Centenary Cancer Research Center at the Centenary Institute and Honorary Professor at the NHMRC Clinical Trials Centre at the University of Sydney.

Hogg is most known for research focusing on protein disulfide bonds and their functional role in thrombosis and cancer.

== Education ==
Hogg completed his B.Sc. in Biochemistry from the University of Queensland in 1984 followed by a Ph.D. in Biochemistry from the same institution in 1987. Later, he completed his post-doctoral fellowship at the American Red Cross Research Laboratory from 1987 to 1989 and Malmö General Hospital, Sweden from 1990 to 1991.

== Career ==
Hogg began his academic career in 1991 at the University of New South Wales (UNSW), where he held various positions. From 1991 to 1992, he served as an NH&MRC Senior Research Officer at the Prince of Wales Hospital, and then held the position of NH&MRC R. Douglas Wright Fellow from 1993 to 1995 at the Centre for Thrombosis & Vascular Research. Subsequently, he worked as a Senior Research Fellow from 1996 to 1999 and as a Principal Research Fellow from 2001 to 2005 at the same research center. Additionally, from 1999 to 2000, he held a concurrent appointment as a Visiting Fellow at the Children's Hospital at Harvard University. Following that, he served as a Senior Principal Research Fellow at the UNSW Cancer Research Center from 2006 to 2009 and at the Lowy Cancer Research Center from 2010 to 2016.

Hogg served as the Inaugural Director of the UNSW Cancer Research Centre from 2006 to 2009, and subsequently as the Director of the Lowy Cancer Research Centre at the University of New South Wales from 2010 to 2016. He serves as Head of the ACRF Centenary Cancer Research Center at the Centenary Institute and Honorary Professor at the NHMRC Clinical Trials Centre at the University of Sydney.

Hogg is the founding scientist of Cystemix Pty Ltd, PENAO Pty Ltd and Amplificare Pty Ltd.

== Research ==
Hogg's research on protein disulfide bonds has won him numerous awards including the GlaxoSmithKline Australia Award for Research Excellence. He is the primary inventor of 35 registered and 4 PCT patents specifically focused on the targeting of allosteric disulfides for the treatment of cancer and has authored numerous publications spanning the areas of thrombosis and cancer.

=== Disulfide bonds and protein function ===
Hogg's research has shown that disulfide bonds within proteins possess a remarkable degree of dynamism, contrary to previous assumptions of their complete formation and inertness. He has demonstrated that several secreted proteins are constitutively produced as multiple partially disulfide-bonded forms. He has also identified a subset of disulfide bonds he named the allosteric disulfides that function as active regulators in soluble and membrane proteins, wherein their selective disruption, mediated by specific factors, governs protein activity.

During Hogg's investigation into the conservation and acquisition of disulfide bonds in eukaryotic proteins, he examined the preservation of disulfide bonds in 29 fully sequenced eukaryotic genomes and observed that once a disulfide bond appeared in a protein it was very rarely lost thereafter, and acquisition of a disulfide coincided with the evolution of a new protein in most cases. He also devised a classification system for disulfide bonds based on the geometry of the five dihedral angles that describe the cystine residue and found that only a few of the 20 disulfide conformations are used in allosteric disulfides. His research utilized a technology to quantify the redox state of protein disulfide bonds to demonstrate that several human blood proteins are naturally produced and function as multiple partially disulfide-bonded forms or covalent states. A subsequent study suggested that the quantification of covalent states of a protein containing multiple disulfide bonds can be approximated by employing probabilities associated with the formation of the disulfide bonds. Hogg has also examined the role of allosteric disulfides in controlling protein-ligand interactions, enzyme catalysis, protein proteolysis and protein oligomerization. For example, in a collaborative study with Passam and others, he investigated how a platelet integrin disengages from its ligand and described an allosteric disulfide in the integrin that when cleaved by a vascular thiol isomerase triggers release from its ligand. In a subsequent study with Chiu and others, the same mechanism of disengagement was described for a neutrophil integrin.

=== Thrombosis ===
Hogg's coagulation research has contributed to the study of the complex relationships between bleeding and clotting. His early research explored the molecular process that transitions tissue factor from a cryptic to active form. Specifically, he found that an allosteric disulfide bond in tissue factor plays a crucial role in the coagulation process. More recently, he has described an allosteric disulfide that controls platelet capture via von Willebrand factor at sites of blood vessel injury and defined a particular disulfide bonded state of the platelet αIIbβ3 integrin receptor. He has shown that one third of integrin molecules have an unformed αIIb subunit disulfide bond that changes distribution and function of the receptor.

=== Cancer ===
Hogg's research has resulted in the development of targeted therapies aimed at disrupting or modifying specific disulfide bonds to impede cancer progression. He has also developed an imaging agent for cell death that exploits the loss of plasma membrane integrity associated with cell death mechanisms. This technology has been licensed to the biotechnology start-ups Cystemix Pty Ltd, PENAO Pty Ltd and Amplificare Pty Ltd.

== Awards and honors ==
- 2001 – GlaxoSmithKline Australia Award for Research Excellence
- 2006 – GE Healthcare Bio-Sciences Award, Australian Society for Biochemistry and Molecular Biology
- 2009 – Oscar Ratnoff Award, International Society on Thrombosis and Haemostasis
- 2016 – Barry Firkin Oration, Australian Society of Thrombosis and Haemostasis
- 2017 – Elected Fellow of the Australian Academy of Health and Medical Sciences

== Selected articles ==
- Hogg, P. J. (2003). Disulfide bonds as switches for protein function. Trends in Biochemical Sciences, 28(4), 210–214.
- Schmidt, B., Ho, L., Hogg, P. J. (2006) Allosteric disulfide bonds. Biochemistry 45(24), 7429–7433.
- Chiu, J., & Hogg, P. J. (2019) Allosteric disulfides: Sophisticated molecular structures enabling flexible protein regulation. Journal of Biological Chemistry 294(8), 2949–2960.
- Butera, D., & Hogg, P. J. (2020) Fibrinogen function achieved through multiple covalent states. Nature Communications 11, 5468
- Pijning, A. E., Blyth, M. T., Coote, M. L., Passam, F., Chiu, J., & Hogg, P. J. (2021) An alternate covalent form of platelet αIIbβ3 integrin that resides in focal adhesions and has altered function. Blood 138, 1359–1372.
- Ho Shon, I., Hennessy, T., Guille, J., Gotsbacher, M. P., Lay, A. J., McBride, B., Codd, R., & Hogg, P. J. (2022) A first-in-human study of [68Ga]Ga-CDI: a positron emitting radiopharmaceutical for imaging tumour cell death. European Journal of Nuclear Medicine and Molecular Imaging. 49, 4037–4047.
