= Australian Cancer Research Foundation =

Australian not-for-profit organisation

- Founded: 1984
- Founder: Sir Peter Abeles AC and Lady (Sonia) McMahon
- Type: Non-profit organization
- Location: Australia
- Region served: Australia
- Key people: Dr Tim Cooper AM (Chairman) and Kerry Strydom (Chief Executive)
- Website: www.acrf.com.au

Australian Cancer Research Foundation (ACRF) is an Australian not-for-profit organisation which funds research into the prevention, diagnosis and treatment of all types of cancer. It provides multimillion-dollar grants for innovative research equipment, technology, and infrastructure development to support the work of Australian cancer scientists and clinicians.

== History and structure ==
Established in 1984 by businessman and philanthropist, the late Sir Peter Abeles AC.

Lady (Sonia) McMahon was also a founding Board member until her death in 2010.

A Board of Trustees, composed of prominent and influential Australians govern the organisation, headed by chair, Tim Cooper AM.

A Medical Research Advisory Committee (MRAC) comprising Australian and international cancer experts, assesses all grant applications, shortlists applicants for a panel interview and advises the ACRF Board of Trustees on which grant applications will have the highest impact in improving cancer prevention, diagnosis and/or treatment. Membership of the MRAC is authorised by the National Health and Medical Research Council. The current co-chairs of the MRAC are Michelle Haber AM and professor Ricky Johnstone.

== Funding ==
The Foundation awards grants between $1.5 million and $10 million, based on scientific excellence, a cohesive research program, qualified team and strong governance. To date, $209+ million has been awarded through 93 grants to 44 research institutes, universities and hospitals across Australia, for research into all cancers. ACRF is privately funded — it receives no government funding. Financial statements are publicly available on the Foundation's website.

=== Project funding approved ===
Year	Amount	State/ Territory	Institute/Hospital/Centre	Project
1985	$1,0000,000	NSW	Centre for Immunology, St Vincent's Hospital, Sydney	Immune system and cancer defence
1988	$610,000	VIC	Cancer Research Centre, St Vincent's Institute of Medical Research, Melbourne	Solid cancers and bone breakdown
1991	$1,080,000	VIC	Austin Research Institute, Melbourne	Immune system and cancer defence (breast, ovarian, pancreas, lung, and bowel cancers)
1994	$1,096,000	QLD	Centre for Molecular & Cellular Biology, Institute for Molecular Bioscience, University of Queensland, Brisbane	Skin, kidney and childhood cancers
1994	$1,000,000	SA	Hanson Centre, Royal Adelaide Hospital	Leukaemia and solid cancers
1997	$1,000,000	ACT	Medical Genome Centre, Australian National University, Canberra	Immune system, gene and cancer defence
1997	$1,002,000	NSW	Westmead Institute for Cancer Research, Westmead Millennium Institute for Medical Research, Sydney	Skin, breast and ovarian cancers and leukaemia
1998	$50,000	TAS	University of Tasmania, Hobart	Immune system and cancer defence
1999	$1,000,000	QLD	Centre for Immunology and Cancer Research, University of Queensland, Brisbane	Vaccine for cervical cancer
1999	$1,200,000	WA	Western Australian Institute for Medical Research, Royal Perth Hospital	Eight state-of-the-art research laboratories
2000	$1,300,000	VIC and QLD	Australian Genome Research Facility	Microarray
2001	$1,000,000	VIC	Walter and Eliza Hall Institute, Melbourne	3D Imaging of proteins
2001	$500,000	NSW	Children's Cancer Institute Australia, University of New South Wales, Sydney	Formation of new blood vessels
2002	$1,500,000	SA	University of Adelaide	Early diagnosis
2002	$1,350,000	QLD	Queensland Institute of Medical Research, Brisbane	Cellular imaging
2003	$1,200,000	QLD	Institute for Molecular Bioscience, Brisbane	Cellular imaging
2003	$1,100,000	NSW	Garvan Institute of Medical Research, Sydney	Molecular genetics
2003	$1,000,000	VIC	Peter MacCallum Cancer Centre, Melbourne	Cell Imaging program
2004	$1,000,000	VIC	Murdoch Children's Research Institute, Melbourne	New children's cancer research centre laboratories
2004	$1,130,000	ACT	John Curtin School of Medical Research, The Australian National University, Canberra	Biomolecular Resource Facility
2004	$900,000	VIC	St. Vincent's Institute of Medical Research, Melbourne	ACRF Rational Drug Discovery Facility
2005	$1,140,000	QLD	Queensland Brain Institute, University of Queensland, Brisbane	Integrated Brain Tumour Flow Cytometry Screening Facility
2005	$1,000,000	VIC	Royal Melbourne Hospital	Translational research laboratory interface (hematology and bone marrow research)
2005	$1,000,000	VIC	The Ludwig Institute for Cancer Research, Melbourne	Bioinfomatics and tissue banking
2005	$1,000,000	NSW	Westmead Institute for Cancer Research, Westmead Millennium Institute for Medical Research, Sydney	New wing increasing collaboration among researchers
2005	$1,000,000	SA	Flinders University/Flinders Medical Centre, Adelaide	Flinders Centre for Innovation in Cancer Prevention and Care laboratory
2006	$5,000,000	NSW	Centenary Institute for Cancer Research and Sydney Cancer Centre	ACRF Centre for Basic and Translational Cancer Research
2006	$1,200,000	NSW	Royal Prince Alfred Hospital, Sydney	Cell and Molecular Therapy Unit equipment and fit-out
2006	$1,100,000	TAS	Menzies Research Institute, Hobart	ACRF Tasmanian Inherited Cancer Centre
2007	$5,000,000	NSW	Centenary Institute for Cancer Research and Sydney Cancer Centre	ACRF Centre for Basic and Translational Cancer Research
2007	$3,200,000	QLD	The Diamantina Institute for Cancer, Immunology and Metabolic Medicine, Brisbane	ACRF Comprehensive Cancer Genomics Facility
2007	$3,100,000	NSW	Children's Cancer Institute Australia for Medical Research, Sydney	ACRF Drug Discovery Centre for Childhood Cancer
2007	$2,700,000	QLD	Queensland Institute for Medical Research, Brisbane	The ACRF Centre for Cancer Epigenetics
2008	$2,500,000	VIC	Peter MacCallum Cancer Centre, Melbourne	For new technologies to identify genes controlling cancer cell behaviour
2008	$2,500,000	QLD	Institute for Molecular Bioscience, University of Queensland, Brisbane	To decipher gene and protein interactions which affect the behaviour of cancer cells
2008	$2,500,000	NSW	The Garvan St Vincents Campus Cancer Centre, Sydney	To support the research components which will be part of a world-class comprehensive cancer centre
2009	$3,500,000	SA	Centre for Cancer Biology, South Australian Pathology and The University of Adelaide	To establish a new Cancer Genomics Facility
2009	$3,100,000	NSW	Children's Medical Research Institute, Sydney and University of Newcastle	For the world's first Chemical Proteomics Centre for Kinomics
2010	$2,500,000	NSW	The Garvan St Vincent's Campus Cancer Centre (Kinghorn Cancer Centre), Sydney	To extend the 2008 grant to support the research components which will be part of a world-class comprehensive cancer centre
2010	$2,400,000	WA	The Western Australian Institute for Medical Research, Perth	For the ACRF Cancer Imaging Facility to promote innovation in cancer research, and ensure a high quality imaging hub to facilitate world-class cancer discoveries with direct relevance to clinical outcomes
2010	$2,000,000	VIC	The Walter and Eliza Hall Institute, Melbourne	To expand their two new cancer divisions – the Stem Cells and Cancer Division and Chemical Biology Division
2010	$1,600,000	VIC	Monash Institute of Medical Research, Melbourne	For the ACRF Centre for Cancer Genomics to facilitate innovative and internationally competitive research that translates to significant outcomes in the prevention, diagnosis and treatment of cancer
2011	$5,000,000	NSW	Westmead Institute for Cancer Research, Westmead Millennium Institute for Medical Research, Sydney	For new ACRF Melanoma Research Laboratories which will house two internationally recognised melanoma research teams
2011	$2,000,000	VIC	Ludwig Institute for Cancer Research, Melbourne	To develop a new ACRF Centre for Translational Cancer Therapeutics and Imaging
2011	$2,000,000	VIC	St Vincent's Institute of Medical Research, Melbourne	To expand the existing ACRF Rational Drug Discovery Centre
2012	$3,500,000	VIC	Peter MacCallum Cancer Centre, Melbourne	For cancer cell isolation and profiling of rare tumour populations
2012	$2,000,000	QLD	Centre for Clinical Research, University of Queensland, Brisbane	Technologies for molecular genetics, including exact tumour localisation and analysis
2012	$2,000,000	QLD	Diamantina Institute, Brisbane	Seed-funding for the development of an individualised oncology care centre
2013	$2,600,000	QLD	QIMR Berghofer Medical Research Institute, Brisbane	Development of a cutting-edge Centre for Comprehensive Biomedical Imaging
2013	$2,000,000	NSW	Children's Medical Research Institute, Sydney	To establish a dedicated Telomere Analysis Centre
2013	$2,000,000	VIC	The Victorian Comprehensive Cancer Centre, Melbourne	To fit-out a specialised centre for translational research and personalised cancer medicine
2013	$1,800,000	SA	South Australian Health and Medical Research Institute, Adelaide	Seed-funding for a new ACRF Innovative Cancer Imaging and Therapeutics Facility
2014	$2,500,000	VIC	Walter and Eliza Hall Institute, Melbourne	For the development of the ACRF Breakthrough Technologies Laboratory to advance new treatments for many of Australia's most common, and most deadly cancers
2014	$1,500,000	NSW	Children's Cancer Institute, Sydney	Development of a Precision Medicine Centre for children at high risk of treatment failure
2014	$2,500,000	QLD	Centre for Advanced Imaging, University of Queensland, Brisbane	To establish an imaging facility that enhances treatment options for companion animals with cancer, and humans.
2014	$2,500,000	NSW	Central Clinical School, University of Sydney, Sydney	Development of improved radiotherapy and imaging techniques for cancer patients.
2015	$1,000,000	QLD	University of Queensland, Brisbane	For discovery and development of innovative methods for the early detection of lung cancer to allow earlier intervention and improved treatment outcomes
2015	$2,000,000	VIC	The Australian Synchrotron, Victoria	For the technology to place Australia at the forefront of cancer drug discovery and development
2015	$2,000,000	SA	Centre for Cancer Biology, Adelaide	For technology to accelerate our understanding of the causes of cancer and translate these findings into improved outcomes for cancer patients
2015	$2,000,000	ACT	The John Curtin School of Medical Research, Acton, ANU	To explore existing collections of Australia's native plants for new cancer treatments
2015	$10,000,000	NSW	Children's Medical Research Institute, Westmead	To establish the ACRF International Centre for the Proteome of Cancer (ProCan).This facility will provide a major step forward for cancer diagnosis and treatment of Australians. By analysing tens of thousands of samples of all types of cancers from all over the world, scientists in Australia will develop a library of information to advance scientific discovery and enhance clinical treatment worldwide
2016	$2,000,000	VIC	Peter MacCallum Cancer Centre, Melbourne	To learn more about the mutation, internal variation, location and the impact of time on the growth and treatment of tumours
2016	$2,500,000	NSW	Centenary Institute, Sydney	To determine the differences in nutrient metabolism by cancerous and normal cells to improve cancer treatments
2016	$2,300,000	QLD	Institute for Molecular Bioscience, Brisbane	To provide microscopes that can see cancer cell behaviour and their response to drugs in order to stop the spread of cancer
2016	$1,200,000	VIC	Monash University and Alfred Hospital, Melbourne	To develop a national program to improve patient outcomes for multiple myeloma and acute myeloid leukaemia
2017	$2,000,000	VIC	Olivia Newton-John Cancer Research Institute and La Trobe University, Melbourne	For new imaging technology which will help develop new therapies by examining tumours within the patient's body as well as individual cells in a tumour.
2017	$1,750,000	WA	Harry Perkins Institute of Medical Research, Perth	For equipment that will help build in-depth knowledge of all cell types that make up a tumour. This will provide new insights into how cancer cells evolve and interact with normal cells, leading to new treatments.
2017	$1,750,000	QLD	QIMR Berghofer Medical Research Institute, Brisbane	For the development of manufacturing and monitoring facilities that will support new immunotherapy clinical trials
2017	$2,000,000	NSW	South Western Sydney Local Health District, Sydney	For a new facility that supports research into improving long-term outcomes of cancer patients and survivors
2018	$9,900,000	QLD, NSW, VIC	University of Queensland, University of Sydney and Monash University	To establish a diagnostic centre for the early detection of melanoma, with a roll out of fifteen total body imaging systems
2018	$2,000,000	VIC	Bio21 Molecular Science and Technology Institute	To develop cutting-edge drug discovery technology for cancers with no approved therapy available, or requiring improved treatment
2018	$2,500,000	SA	South Australian Health and Medical Research Institute	For technology to provide new approaches to interrogate cancer biology
2018	$2,000,000	QLD	Compounds Australia, Griffith University	To establish a transformative acoustic compound management compound with integrated software to enable Australian researchers access to the most advanced compound capability available
2019	$3,500,000	NSW	Children's Cancer Institute	To establish The ACRF Child Cancer Liquid Biopsy Program, which will use latest technologies to develop a suite of blood tests for childhood cancer patients aimed at improved diagnosis, earlier relapse detection, better monitoring of treatment response and enhanced delivery of the right treatment to the right child at the right time.
2019	$3,500,000	VIC	Walter and Eliza Hall Institute for Medical Research	To focus on the discovery of triggers that drive cancer development, how genetic diversity in cancers affects treatment efficacy, and develop better ways of personalising cancer therapies to conquer the biggest challenges in cancer today – predicting and improving patients' treatment response and overcoming drug resistance.
2020	$1.8 million	VIC	Peter MacCallum Cancer Centre	To establish the ACRF Radiation Immuno-oncology Program, a unique Victoria-based program that will study how radiation therapy also triggers host anti-cancer immune defences, much like a vaccine.
2020	$3 million	NSW	Garvan Institute of Medical Research	To establish the ACRF Centre for Intravital Imaging of Niches for Cancer Immune Therapy at Sydney’s Garvan Institute of Medical Research. This world-first Australian-designed custom intravital microscopy centre will overcome the limitations of conventional microscopes in viewing the interactions between the immune system and cancer, below the surface of tumours and deep inside tissues.
2020	$1.2 million	QLD	University of Queensland	To establish the ACRF Facility for Targeted Radiometals in Cancer at The University of Queensland’s Centre for Advanced Imaging. An Australian-first facility for the discovery, development and clinical translation of novel alpha particle-based cancer therapeutics, with the aim of unlocking the cancer-curing potential of targeted alpha therapy.
2021	$2.6 million	QLD	Griffith University Institute for Glycomics	To establish the ACRF International Centre for Cancer Glycomics which will be a unique hub of exciting and revolutionary cancer glycomics research.
2021	$2 million	QLD	The University of Queensland Thoracic Research Centre	To establish the ACRF Lung Cancer Screening Centre of Excellence, a world-first mobile lung cancer multiplatform research facility focused on early detection research for lung cancer - the leading cause of cancer deaths globally.
2021	$1.5 million	NSW	Centenary Institute	To establish the ACRF Molecular Theranostics Laboratory which will house world-leading research into the use of theranostics to treat cancer.
2022	$2.1 million	VIC	Olivia Newton-John Cancer Research Institute	To establish the ACRF Centre for Precision Medicine at the Olivia Newton-John Cancer Research Institute (ONJCRI) that will utilise a “theranostic” approach of combined imaging and treatment with novel drugs to enhance therapeutic responses and exploit new technology for tumour treatment.
2023	$2 million	NSW	Children's Cancer Institute of Australia	To establish the ACRF Spatial Immune-oncology Research Program. This world-leading program will utilise the latest technologies to cast light on the complex interactions between cancer cells and immune cells in children, accelerating the discovery, development, and deployment of new and effective immune-based therapeutic strategies for children with cancer.
2023	$2 million	NSW	Macquarie University	To establish the ACRF Centre for Advanced Cancer Modelling, a unique program of research that aims to transform the assessment of the best available treatment for an individual.
2023	$2 million	QLD	QIMR Berghofer Medical Research Institute	To establish the ACRF Centre for Optimised Cancer Therapy. This grant will enable the research team to optimise and improve treatments, based on individual patient responses, ensuring every patient has the best chance of cure from their cancer.
2024	$2 million	VIC	Alfred Health and Monash University	To establish the ACRF Centre for Dynamic Immuno-Oncology. This innovative research initiative aims to address key challenges in cancer immunotherapy.
2024	$5 million	NSW	Children's Cancer Institute	To establish the ACRF Childhood Cancer Early Detection, Prevention and Treatment Program. This Centre will focus on diagnosing cancer predisposition, preventing early disease progression and recurrence; advancing safer and more effective treatments; and developing targeted therapies for previously untreatable cancers.
2024	$3 million	VIC	Peter MacCallum Cancer Centre	To establish the ACRF Centre for Cellular Imaging of Precision Immunotherapy which aims to unlock the power of immunotherapy for more people with cancer by discovering causes of resistance and predicting individual benefit.
2024	$10 million	VIC	Peter MacCallum Cancer Centre	To establish the ACRF Centre of Advanced Imaging-Guided Cancer Therapeutics. The Centre will install a world-first total-body PET/CT scanner – an ultrasensitive and ultrafast molecular scanning device that enables cancer to be pinpointed and targeted with unmatched precision.
2025	$2.5 million	VIC	Walter & Eliza Hall Institute of Medical Research	To establish the ACRF BRAIINSTORM Program, a landmark Australian initiative to accelerate the development of new therapies for an aggressive and lethal form of brain cancer: High-Grade Gliomas.
2025	$2.5 million	QLD	Princess Alexandra Hospital and Griffith University	To establish the ACRF Centre for High-Risk Breast Cancer that will provide a world leading magnetic resonance scanner that can detect warning chemical changes in breast tissue years before cancer appears.
2025	$2.5 million	NSW	Garvan Institute of Medical Research	To establish the ACRF Centre for Mass spectrometry Analysis of Tumour Response In compleX microenvironments (MATRIX) that will improve the ability to investigate why some cancers resist treatment and spread to other organs.
2025	$1.8 million	NSW	University of Sydney	To establish the ACRF Single Cell Cancer Proteomics Laboratory (SCPL), a national platform that enables researchers to unlock insights into how individual cancer and immune cells behave and respond to treatment.
