= David James (cell biologist) =

Australian cell biologist (born 1958)

David James FAA
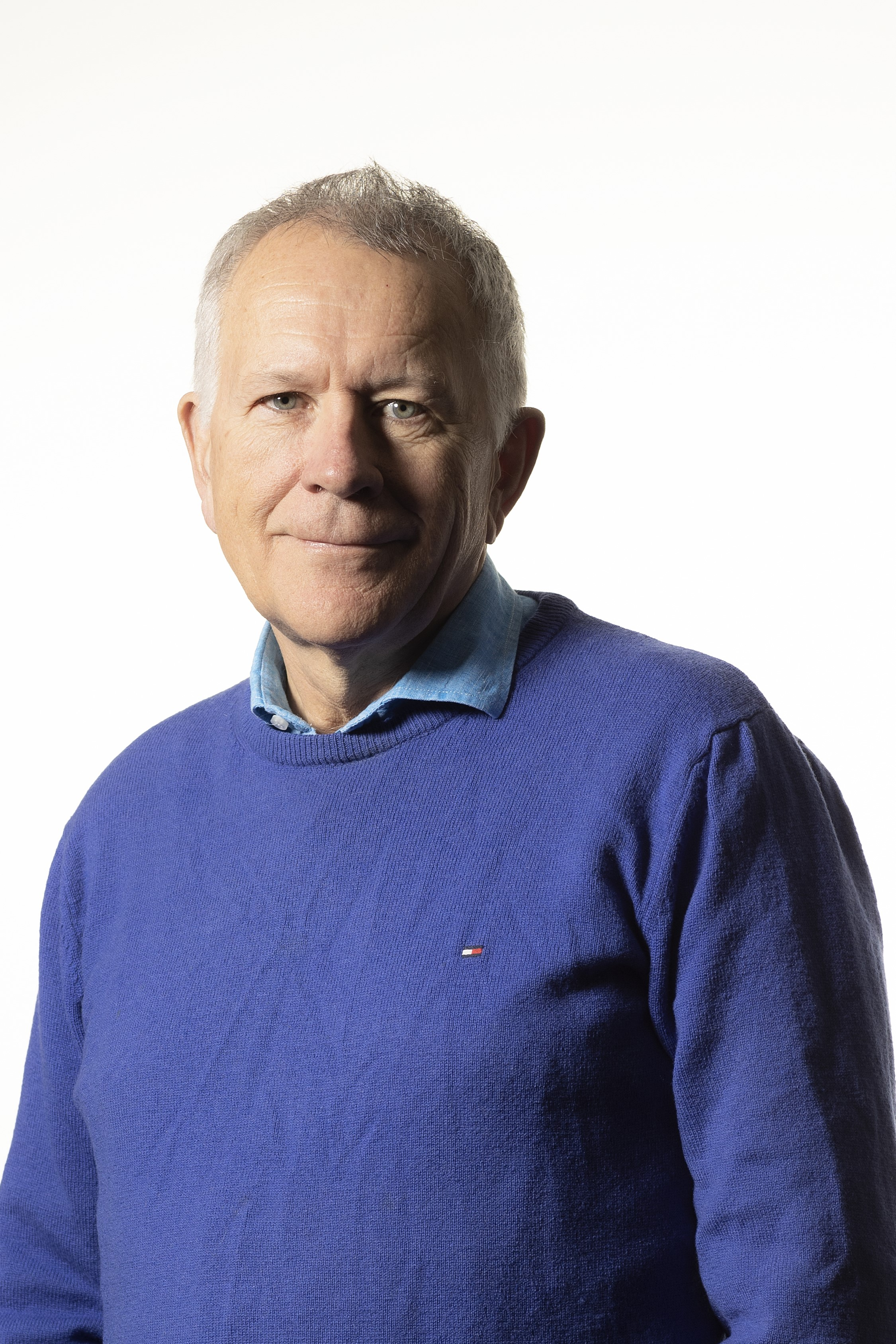
- Education: University of New South Wales; Garvan Institute of Medical Research
- Known for: discovery of GLUT4
- Awards: Lemberg Medal
- Scientific career
- Fields: cell biology
- Workplaces: University of Sydney
- Website: https://sydney.edu.au/science/people/david.james.php

David Ernest James FAA (born in Sydney in 1958) is a cell biologist who discovered the glucose transporter GLUT4. He has also been responsible for the molecular dissection of the intracellular trafficking pathways that regulate GLUT4 translocation to the cell surface, the topological mapping of the insulin signal transduction pathway, the creation of a method for studying in vivo metabolism in small animals, and the use of this method to gain insights into whole-animal fuel metabolism and homeostasis. He currently holds joint appointments as the Leonard P Ullmann Chair in Molecular Systems Biology and as the Domain Leader for Biology for the Charles Perkins Centre at the University of Sydney.

== Career ==
In 1979 he graduated with a BSc (Hons) from the University of New South Wales, and gained his Ph.D. at the Garvan Institute of Medical Research in 1985. Subsequently, he pursued postdoctoral research at Boston University and Washington University in St. Louis in the US. In 1993 he returned to Australia, first to Brisbane and then once again at the Garvan Institute.

In 1989 he established his own independent career as Assistant Professor at Washington University in St Louis where he continued his work on GLUT4.

In 1993 he returned to Australia on a Wellcome Trust Senior Research Fellowship taking up a position at the Institute for Molecular Bioscience in Brisbane.

In 2002 he moved to Sydney to head up the Diabetes and Obesity Research Program at the Garvan Institute as an NHMRC Senior Principal Research Fellow where he remained until February 2014.

In 2014 he moved to the University of Sydney. He currently holds joint appointments as the Leonard P Ullmann Chair in Molecular Systems Biology and as the Domain Leader for Biology for the Charles Perkins Centre at the University of Sydney.

== Awards and honours ==
- 1993–1997: Wellcome Trust Research Fellowship
- 1999: Glaxo Wellcome Australia Medal
- 2000: Mary Kugel Award for services to the Juvenile Diabetes Foundation
- 2006: Kellion Award from the Australian Diabetes Society
- 2007: Fellow of the Australian Academy of Science
- 2008: Millennium Award, Diabetes Australian Research Trust
- 2014: ANZCDBS President's Medal
- 2016: NSW Premier's Prize for Medical Research
- 2017: Awarded Best Speaker at F1000 Winter School
- 2018: Basic Science Lecturer, Cardiac Society Australia and New Zealand Annual General Meeting
- 2019: Honorary Doctorate, University of Copenhagen
- 2020: Australian Laureate Fellowship
- 2020: Vice-Chancellor's Award for the Outstanding Educational Engagement and Innovation category, The University of Sydney
- 2023: Australian Diabetes Society Lifetime Achievement Award
- 2026: Lemberg Medal, Australian Society for Biochemistry and Molecular Biology
