= Procyclic =

Procyclic may refer to:

- a term related to the profinite groups in mathematics
- In chemistry, a term referring to an acyclic compound that can be converted to a cyclic product in one step, in the same sense as prochiral
- Procyclic life stage, a life stage of the Trypanosoma parasite in African trypanosomiasis
- Procyclical and countercyclical are terms used to describe how an economic quantity is related to economic fluctuations.
