= Suzanne Cory =

Australian biologist (born 1942)

Suzanne Cory AC FAA FRS
- Born: 11 March 1942 (age 84); Melbourne, Australia
- Education: University of Melbourne (BSc), University of Cambridge (PhD)
- Spouse: Jerry Adams
- Children: 2
- Awards: Australia Prize (1998); L'Oréal-UNESCO Award for Women in Science (2001); Royal Medal (2002); Pearl Meister Greengard Prize (2009)
- Scientific career
- Fields: Genetics and the immune system
- Workplaces: Walter and Eliza Hall Institute of Medical Research; MRC Laboratory of Molecular Biology

Suzanne Cory (born 11 March 1942) is an Australian molecular biologist. She has worked on the genetics of the immune system and cancer and has lobbied her country to invest in science. She is married to fellow scientist Jerry Adams, also a Walter and Eliza Hall Institute of Medical Research scientist.

== Early life and education ==
Suzanne Cory was raised in Kew, in suburban Melbourne, Australia. She was educated at Canterbury Girls' Secondary College and University High School, Melbourne. Cory studied at the University of Melbourne where she graduated with a BSc degree in 1964 and an MSc degree under Lloyd Finch in 1965, both in biochemistry. By then she had "caught the research bug" decided to do her PhD. She applied to the MRC Laboratory of Molecular Biology (LMB) in Cambridge, England and was accepted, due in part to lobbying by Professor Trikojus, and due to her winning an 1851 Exhibition Scholarship. Beginning in 1966, she worked with such giants in the world of molecular biology as Francis Crick, Sydney Brenner, Fred Sanger and Max Perutz, who introduced her to American post-doc Jerry Adams, whom she would later marry. Her project was the purification and sequencing of a transfer RNA, for which she obtained her PhD in Molecular Biology from the University of Cambridge in 1968.

== Career and research ==
Cory travelled to the University of Geneva for her post-doctoral studies. While in Geneva, she focused on sequencing the RNA of R17 bacteriophage for the purpose of using it as a model.

In 1971, Cory and her husband began their research at the Walter and Eliza Hall Institute of Medical Research (WEHI) in Melbourne, Australia. The two scientists helped introduce new scientific technology and methods they had been exposed to in Geneva and Cambridge, which helped expand and better the molecular biology research in Australia. They initially chose to study the genetic component of immunity, discovering that antibody genes are a combination of pieces and can be arranged in a variety of ways. This discovery helped explain the diversity of the immune system and its ability to fight a large array of harmful cell invaders.

After a decade of studying the immune system, Cory's lab switched their focus to cancer and the genetic components of various cancers. Her lab discovered the genetic mutations that lead to Burkitt's lymphoma and Follicular lymphoma. One of the main focuses of their cancer cell research is on cell proliferation and cell death. In particular, the oncoprotein Myc and the Bcl-2 protein family are of interest to her current research lab. Bcl-2 is an important family of intracellular proteins that helps regulate apoptosis, or cell suicide. Bcl-2, paired with other regulators, prevents caspases from being activated. The caspases, a type of protease, remain inactive until signaled through a cascade to degrade the proteins that make up a cell. Cory's lab has developed Bcl2-blocking agents called BH3 mimetics, which, when paired with low-dose chemotherapy, have had positive results treating specific types of aggressive lymphomas.

Cory is the immediate past President of the Australian Academy of Science. She was the first-elected woman President of the Academy and took office on 7 May 2010 for a four-year term, replacing the former president, Professor Kurt Lambeck.

Cory was the Director of WEHI from 1996 until 30 June 2009 and remains a faculty member, having rejoined the institute's Molecular Genetics of Cancer Division. Her current research focuses on genetic changes in blood cancers and the effects of chemotherapeutic drugs on the cancer cells. Cory's work has been published in Blood, The EMBO Journal, Nature, Cell Death & Differentiation, and Proceedings of the National Academy of Sciences of the United States of America.

Named in her honour, Suzanne Cory High School opened in the Melbourne suburb of Hoppers Crossing in 2011. The public, select-entry high school caters to 800 students from grades 9-12. The school is in close proximity to Victoria University, which allows students access to the school's facilities and staff.

In 2021, the Australian Academy of Science created the Suzanne Cory Medal for Biomedical Sciences, awarded for outstanding research in all of the biological sciences.

== Awards and honors ==
- 1986 — elected a Fellow of the Australian Academy of Science (FAA)
- 1992 — elected a Fellow of the Royal Society (FRS)
- 1995 — awarded Lemberg Medal
- 1997 — awarded Macfarlane Burnet Medal and Lecture of the Australian Academy of Science
- 1997 — elected Fellow of the Royal Society of Victoria (FRSV)
- 1998 — received Charles S. Mott Prize of the General Motors Cancer Research Foundation (joint recipient)
- 1999 — named a Companion of the Order of Australia (AC)
- 2001 — recipient of a L'Oréal-UNESCO Award for Women in Science
- 2001 — inducted onto Victorian Honour Roll of Women
- 2002 — awarded the Royal Medal of the Royal Society
- 2004 — elected an Academician of the Pontifical Academy of Sciences
- 2009 — named a Chevalier of the Legion of Honor and was presented with her award in Canberra, Australia, by the Ambassador of France in Australia, Michel Filhol
- 2011 — awarded the Association for International Cancer Research Colin Thomson Medal
- 2012 — winner, CSIRO Eureka Prize for Leadership in Science
- 2013 — elected as a Fellow of the inaugural Class of the American Association for Cancer Research (AACR) Academy
- 2014 — delivered the annual ABC Boyer Lectures
- 2021 — elected Fellow of the Australian Academy of Health and Medical Sciences

== Personal life ==
During her time at the LMB, Cory met Jerry Adams, a scientist from the United States. The two scientists later married and had two daughters.
