= Joan Adeney Easdale =

English poet (1913–1998)

Joan Adeney Easdale (23 January 1913 – 10 June 1998) was an English poet from Sevenoaks, Kent. Her mother was the author Gladys Ellen Easdale, née Adeney (1885–1970). Her father, Robert Carse Easdale, left her mother during the First World War. Virginia Woolf discerned some "real merit" in her early work.

== Poetry and the Woolfs ==
In January 1930, Easdale's mother Gladys sent examples of her daughter's poetry to the Hogarth Press. Virginia Woolf described receiving "piles of dirty copy books written in a scrawl without any spelling, but I was taken aback to find, as I thought, some real merit... it may be a kind of infantile phosphorescence.... Very odd." The Woolfs nevertheless took up publishing her books, despite opposition from John Lehmann.

A Collection of Poems (1931) appeared as No. 19 in the series Hogarth Living Poets. It delves into love, sadness, broken relationships and family life. Hugh Walpole described her work as "astonishingly adroit, acute, accomplished". The title poem of her second book, Clemence and Clare (1932), addresses Woolf herself. This slim volume also appeared in the Hogarth Living Poets series, as No. 23. The 60-page mystical narrative poem Amber Innocent was published by the Woolfs in 1939.

== Life and family ==
In July 1931 at the Wigmore Hall in London, Easdale recited some of her work to an accompaniment of piano music composed and played by her brother Brian Easdale. He had studied at the Royal College of Music, written his first opera at the age of 17, and was assisted by his friend Benjamin Britten. He also introduced his sister to the Scottish novelist and poet Naomi Mitchison, who had written the libretto for his opera The Corn King. Brian went on to write the music for an Oscar-winning film classic, The Red Shoes (1948).

Easdale herself later worked in London and published in the periodical The Adelphi. She was married in 1938 to the geneticist James Meadows Rendel, who was the grandson of Lytton Strachey's sister Dorothy Bussy, and the nephew of the Bloomsbury Group writer Frances Partridge. She bore her first child, Jane, in 1940.

During the late 1930s and into the 1940s Easdale had some success writing plays and talks for the BBC, including the short plays Mrs Beeton (1937), Stradivarius (1937), and Strange Things (1942). However, struggling with the demands of motherhood and increasingly discouraged by rejections from the BBC, she gradually withdrew from her writing career, as revealed in her correspondence with her friend, champion and mother of six Naomi Richardson.

After moving to Australia with her husband in 1951, Joan began to suffer from heat, partial blindness and severe paranoia, not helped by her husband's indifference to her difficulties. She returned to the UK in 1953, leaving behind her three children, aged 13, 10 and 6. After a mental breakdown in November 1954, she was placed in an asylum – Holloway Sanatorium near Virginia Water, Surrey – where she stayed for seven years, eventually discharging herself in September 1961.

Spells in Brighton and Dover were followed by a move to Nottingham, where she lived for the last 20 years of her life under an assumed name, Sophie or Sophia Curly, initially homeless and afterwards in a series of single-room council flats. The last was the Ash Lea Court retirement home. There she was intermittently visited by her children – Jane Susan Robertson, Polly Mary Virginia Woods, and Sandy Meadows Rendel – and grandchildren. Her gravestone is in Wilford Hill Cemetery.
