= Leanne Redman =

Physiologist

Leanne M. Redman
- Education: Southern Cross University , Tulane University; University of Adelaide
- Known for: low-calorie diets decreased the effects of aging
- Scientific career
- Fields: physiology
- Workplaces: Pennington Biomedical Research Center; Charles Perkins Centre, University of Sydney

Leanne M. Redman is a physiologist. She is an LPFA Endowed Fellowship Professor at the Pennington Biomedical Research Center of the Louisiana State University System, where she studies childhood obesity. She was lead researcher on a study that found that low-calorie diets decreased the effects of aging. Redman received the 2018 NPA Garnett-Powers & Associates Mentor Award in recognition of support for post-doctorate mentee scholars in her reproductive endocrinology lab. In October 2023, Redman was honored by The Obesity Society with the 2023 TOPS Research Achievement Award, in recognition to her contributions to the field of obesity..

In November 2025, she was appointed Academic Director of the Charles Perkins Centre at the University of Sydney.

== Education ==
Redman did her undergraduate studies in human movement science at Southern Cross University in Australia, earning a bachelor's degree with honors there in 2000. She completed a doctorate at the University of Adelaide in 2004. In 2011 she added a master's degree in clinical research from Tulane University.
