= Charles Perkins Centre =

Australian medical research institute

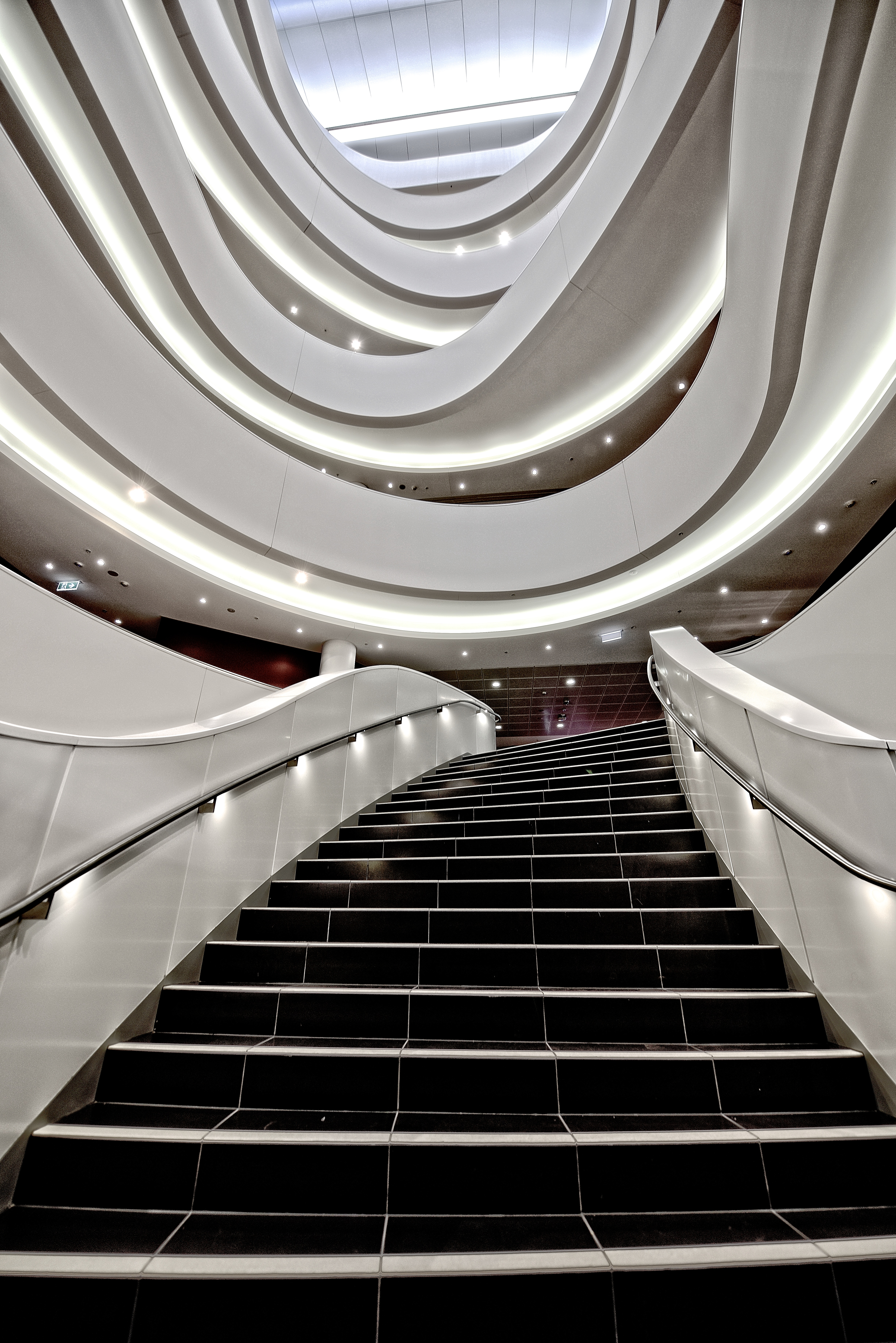
- Atrium of the Charles Perkins Centre
- Established: 2012; 14 years ago
- Mission: Medical research; Higher education
- Focus: Diabetes, cardiovascular disease, obesity
- Academic Director: Leanne Redman
- Faculty: University of Sydney
- Adjunct faculty: Royal Prince Alfred Hospital
- Building details
- Etymology: Dr Charles Perkins AO

General information
- Status: Completed
- Type: Medical research institute and teaching facility
- Architectural style: Modernist
- Location: Royal Prince Alfred Hospital health precinct, Camperdown campus, University of Sydney, Sydney, New South Wales, Australia
- Coordinates: 33°53′15″S 151°11′01″E
- Construction started: 2012
- Opened: June 2014
- Cost: A$385 million
- Client: The University of Sydney, Sydney Medical School

Technical details
- Material: Sydney sandstone, glass, aluminium
- Floor count: 6 + 4 basement levels
- Floor area: 49,500 square metres (533,000 sq ft)

Design and construction
- Architecture firm: Francis-Jones Morehen Thorp with Building Studio
- Engineer: Cubic Group
- Structural engineer: Robert Bird Group
- Civil engineer: Robert Bird Group
- Main contractor: Brookfield Multiplex
- Awards: Shortlisted: World's Best Building award, 2015 (Higher Education and Research)
- Known for: Full height atrium with spiral staircase
- Website: sydney.edu.au/perkins

The Charles Perkins Centre (CPC) is an Australian medical research institute, clinic and education hub that primarily focuses on diabetes, cardiovascular disease and obesity, as well as other related conditions. The centre is affiliated with the University of Sydney and is located within the Royal Prince Alfred Hospital health precinct at the Camperdown campus of the university in Sydney, New South Wales. The centre is named in honour of alumnus Charles Perkins, the first man of Aboriginal descent to graduate from an Australian university. Since November 2025, the centre's academic director is Professor Leanne Redman, who succeeded Professor Stephen Simpson who stepped down in April 2025.

Designed by Francis-Jones Morehen Thorp with Building Studio, construction of the 49,500-square-metre (533,000 sq ft), A$385 million centre began in 2012 and was officially opened in June 2014. Completed in the Modernist Australian architectural style, the centre was shortlisted for the World's Best Building award in the Higher Education and Research category at the 2015 World Architecture Festival.

Many professorial chairs at the centre were funded by the A$20.6 million sale of a Picasso painting at Christie's, which was donated to the university in 2010.

== Research and education focus ==
Obesity, diabetes and cardiovascular disease are the leading causes of death, disability and reduced quality of life in Australia. They are also considered epidemics globally.

== Background ==
Charles Perkins was one of Australia's most prominent Aboriginal activists. Born in 1936 to an Arrernte woman and a Kalkadoon man in Alice Springs, Northern Territory, Perkins graduated from the University of Sydney with a Bachelor of Arts in 1966. Prior to this, he worked for an Adelaide fitter and turner company and had also worked for the City of South Sydney, cleaning public toilets. Perkins was a key member of the Freedom Ride, a bus tour through New South Wales protesting small-town discrimination of Aboriginal people. The action was inspired by the American Civil Rights Freedom Ride campaign in 1961 which travelled from Washington D.C. to New Orleans.

In 1969 Perkins began his career as a public servant as a Senior Research Officer with the Office of Aboriginal Affairs. In 1972, as a public servant, he was suspended for alleged improper conduct after he described the Liberal and the Country Coalition government in Western Australia as being "racist and redneck". He later became the first Aboriginal to become appointed as the Permanent Secretary of the Department of Aboriginal Affairs in 1981. He was a strident critic of the Australian Government and their policies. Perkins also had a career as a soccer player, serving as president for the National Soccer League team Canberra City FC in the Australian Capital Territory.

He died in 2000 from renal failure and is survived by a large family, with two daughters and a son. During the 1970s Perkins had a kidney transplant and at the time of his death was the longest post-transplant survivor in Australia.

== The Picasso painting ==
In 2010, the University of Sydney received a rarely seen Pablo Picasso painting from the private collection of an anonymous donor. The painting, Jeune Fille Endormie, which had never been publicly seen since 1939, depicts the artist's lover, Marie-Thérèse Walter and was donated on the strict understanding that it would be sold and the proceeds directed to medical research. In June 2011 the painting was auctioned at Christie's in London and sold for £13.5 million (A$20.6 million). The proceeds funded the establishment of many endowed professorial chairs at the centre, which at the time of the sale, was yet to be established.

== Building ==
Construction began in late 2012. It was built on a budget of A$385 million. Perkins serves as the symbolic face of the centre, aimed at researching and finding solutions to various illnesses, with over 900 clinicians, students and researchers. Professor Steve Simpson said that "He [Perkins] sought to lead collaborations in situations where a single person or agency could not deliver. In the same way, the Charles Perkins Centre looks beyond traditional disciplinary boundaries to improve the health of individuals, communities and the nation". Perkins' wife, Eileen and their daughters Hetti, Rachel and son Adam attended the black-tie opening of the building in June 2014 at which artists including Megan Washington, the Ltyentye Apurte Dance Group and students from the Sydney Conservatorium of Music performed.

The building has 49,500 square metres (533,000 sq ft) of floor space and is six storeys tall with four basement levels. The centre can house 950 researchers and 1400 students, with both wet and dry laboratory spaces. The ground and basement levels contain clinical facilities in affiliation with the Royal Prince Alfred Hospital. The full-height interior atrium is reminiscent of the atrium inside the Guggenheim Museum in New York City. Having been called the "skeletal system of the building", the atrium features curved balconies and interconnecting sweeping stair cases, serving as the structural expression of the building's purpose. It is the most prominent and noticeable feature of the centre's interior. The curving atrium was designed by architects Francis-Jones Morehen Thorp who collaborated with the Cubic Group responsible for the fabrication and installation of the primary atrium elements. Additionally, it features a bank of glazed elevators common in atrium-style buildings.

The northern facade of the building was designed in sandstone, reflecting the Gothic architecture of the nearby St John's College. The main southern exterior, which looks out onto the Centenary Institute, was designed primarily in glass and aluminium. The building features a large high-tech teaching "X-Lab", capable of hosting 8 different practical classes concurrently, multipurpose teaching spaces, microscopy teaching labs, study pods, a 360-seat auditorium and a café. Clinical facilities include a whole-body calorimeter, metabolic kitchen, exercise physiology gymnasiums, physical testing facilities, phlebotomy bays, biobank, clinical and pre-clinical imaging facilities including one of the world's only 7T and 4T MRIs, CT, X-ray and ultrasound; long-term stay beds, wet and dry research labs and more. Research facilities include seven open-plan laboratories with adjacent open-plan office spaces and associated support rooms, capable of each hosting 10 research groups, an animal house facility, and core facilities in cellular imaging and super-resolution microscopy, pre-clinical and clinical imaging, cytometry, genomics and proteomics.

The centre served as the "Signature Building" of ArchiCAD 21.

== Gallery ==
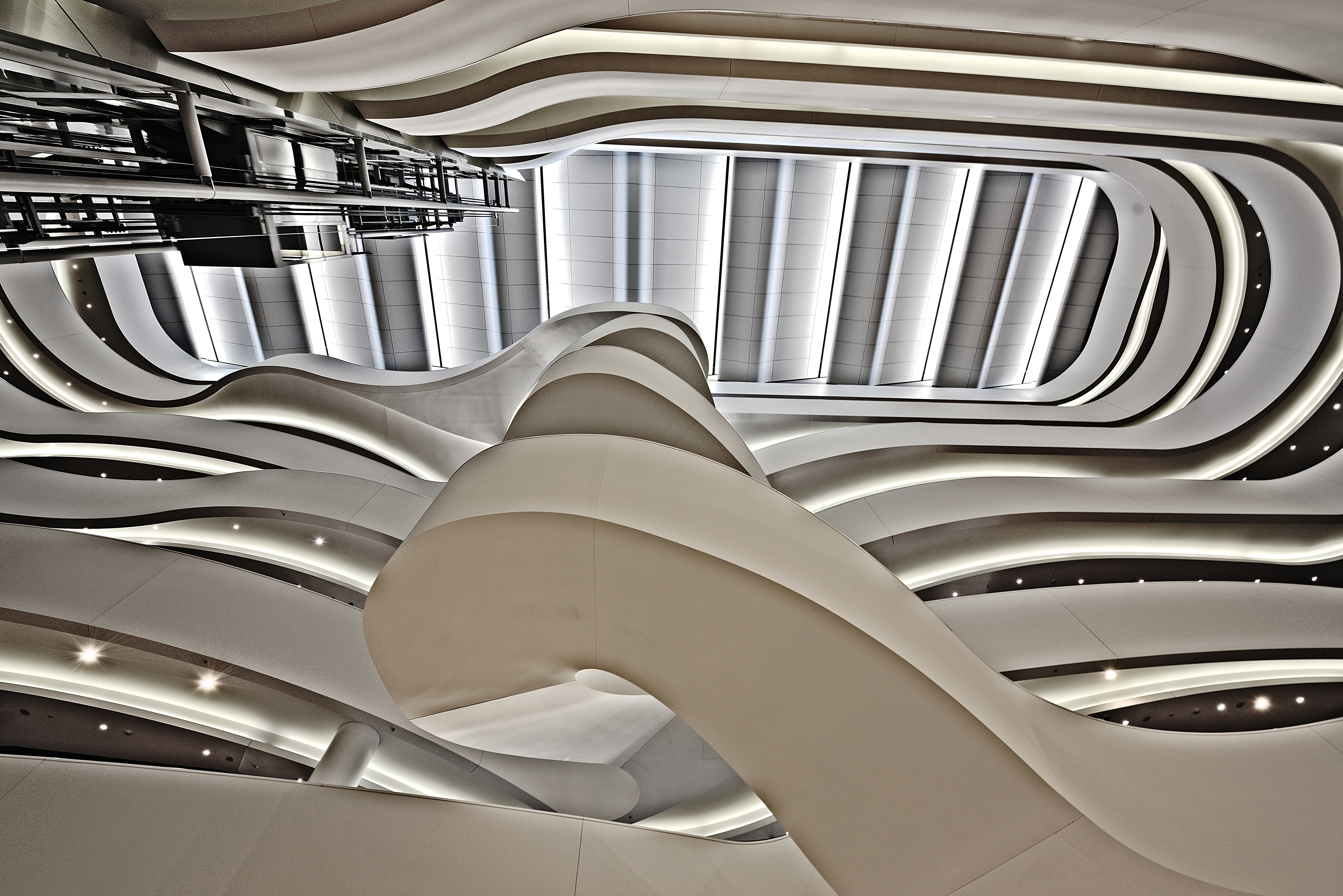
The atrium looking upwards

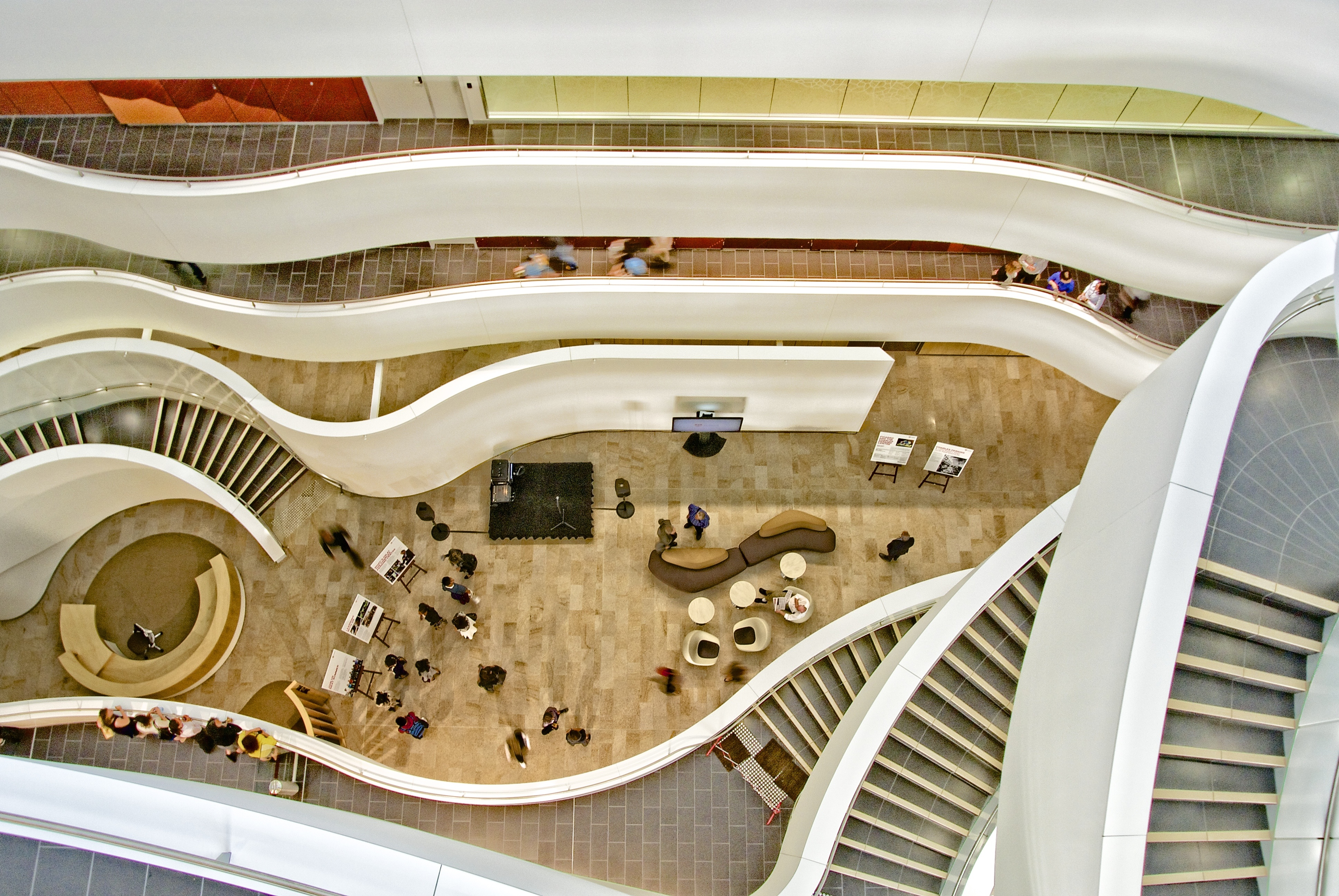
Looking towards the ground floor

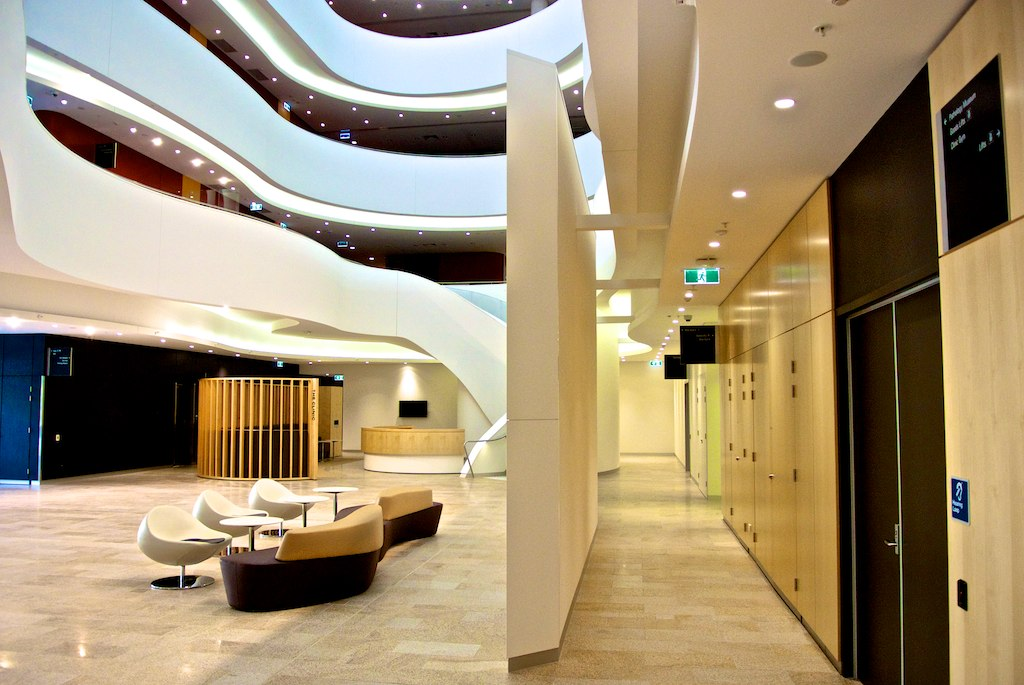
Ground floor

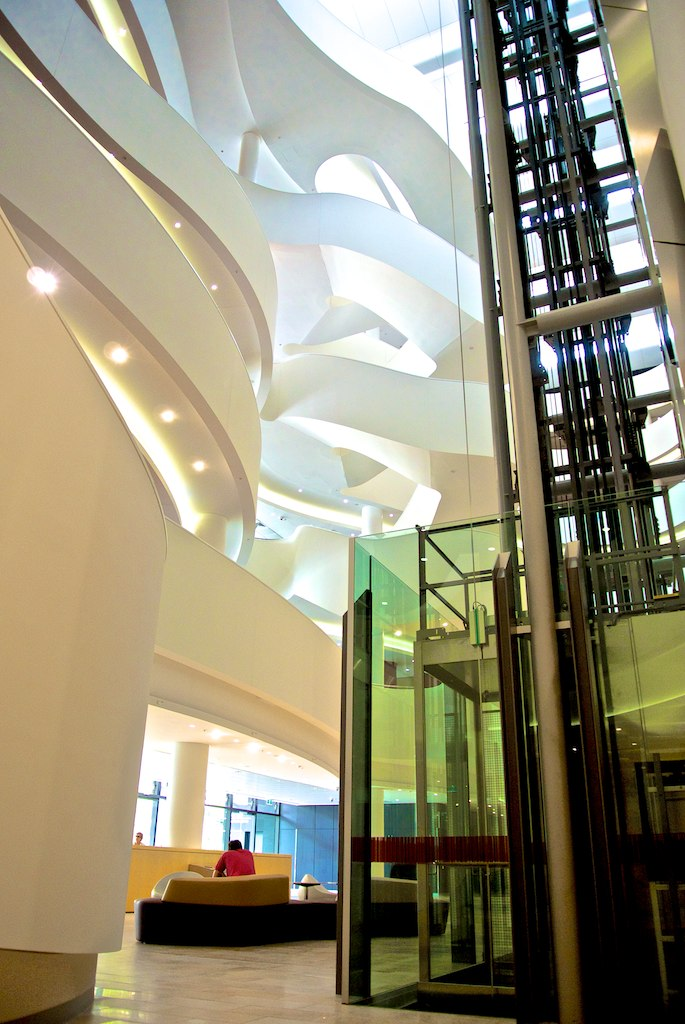
Charles Perkins Centre interior atrium showing the glass elevator

== See also ==
- Health care in Australia
- Cardiovascular disease in Australia
- Diabetes in Australia
- Architecture of Sydney
- Australian non-residential architectural styles
