= Alexander George Ogston =

British biochemist (1911–96)

Alexander George Ogston FAA FRS
- Born: 30 January 1911; Bombay, British India
- Died: 29 June 1996 (aged 85)
- Education: Balliol College, Oxford
- Known for: Three-point attachment theory
- Spouse: Elizabeth Wicksteed
- Relatives: Sir Alexander Ogston (grandfather)
- Awards: Davy Medal (1986); Lemberg Medal (1970)
- Scientific career
- Fields: Biochemistry
- Institutions: Australian National University; University of Oxford
- Doctoral advisor: Ronald Percy Bell

Alexander George Ogston FAA FRS (30 January 1911 – 29 June 1996) was a British biochemist who specialised in the thermodynamics of biological systems. He was a grandson of Sir Alexander Ogston, a Scottish surgeon who discovered Staphylococcus.

== Life ==
Ogston was educated at Eton College and Balliol College, Oxford. Apart from a period as Freedom Research Fellow at the London Hospital, he spent most of his career at Oxford, being appointed Demonstrator (1938) and Reader (1955) in Biochemistry, and Fellow and Tutor in Physical Chemistry at Balliol (1937). In that capacity he had a major influence on other distinguished scientists, such as the Nobel prizewinner Oliver Smithies, who wrote his first paper with him, and Richard Dawkins, who chose to study zoology on his recommendation. In 1959 he took up an appointment as Professor of Physical Biochemistry at the John Curtin School of Medical Research at the Australian National University (ANU), Canberra, where he remained until 1970, when he returned to Oxford as President of Trinity College. On his retirement in 1978, he held visiting fellowships at the Institute for Cancer Research, Philadelphia and the John Curtin School of Medical Research, ANU. Ogston was elected FRS in 1955, and was awarded Lemberg Medal in 1970 and the Davy Medal in 1986.

== Research ==
Ogston studied potentiometric titration of amino acids in non-aqueous solvents. He was particularly interested in sinovial fluid, and fibrous proteins. More generally, he worked on the use of physico-chemical methods to study the size, weight, and structure of molecules, such as ultracentrifugation, which he applied to insulin, for example, and electrophoresis. In this context he made many improvement to equipment used for studying the physical chemistry of proteins. For example, he devised a novel type of apparatus for measuring viscosity. He made many studies of enzymes such as peroxidase and creatine phosphotransferase. He contributed to the general field of enzyme kinetics by studying activation and inhibition.

He made a sceptical study of the suggestions of a repetitive structure of proteins made by Bergmann and Niemann and by Wrinch that were widely discussed in the 1940s.

=== Prochirality and three-point attachment ===
The concept of prochirality is necessary for understanding some aspects of enzyme stereospecificity. Ogston pointed out that when a symmetrical molecule is placed in an asymmetric environment, such as the surface of an enzyme, supposedly identically placed groups become distinguishable. In this way he showed that earlier exclusion of non-chiral citrate as a possible intermediate in the tricarboxylate cycle was mistaken.

A coffee mug with one handle is an everyday example of a prochiral object. If it is placed in an achiral corrosive liquid, such as a concentrated acid, then the left and right-hand sides will be corroded equally because there is nothing to distinguish them. However, if the mug is held in a person's right hand it is easy to drink out of the left-hand side but difficult to drink out of the right-hand side. In other words, an achiral environment such as an acid cannot distinguish between the two sides of a prochiral, but a chiral object like a person can. Thus a chiral enzyme such as aconitase can act differently on two apparently equivalent groups on a prochiral molecule, so citrate can be an intermediate in the tricarboxylate cycle.

Academic offices
Preceded by Arthur Lionel Pugh Norrington	President of Trinity College, Oxford; 1970–1978	Succeeded by Anthony Quinton
