= Stephen Simpson (professor) =

Australian scientist

Stephen Simpson AC FRS FAA FRSN
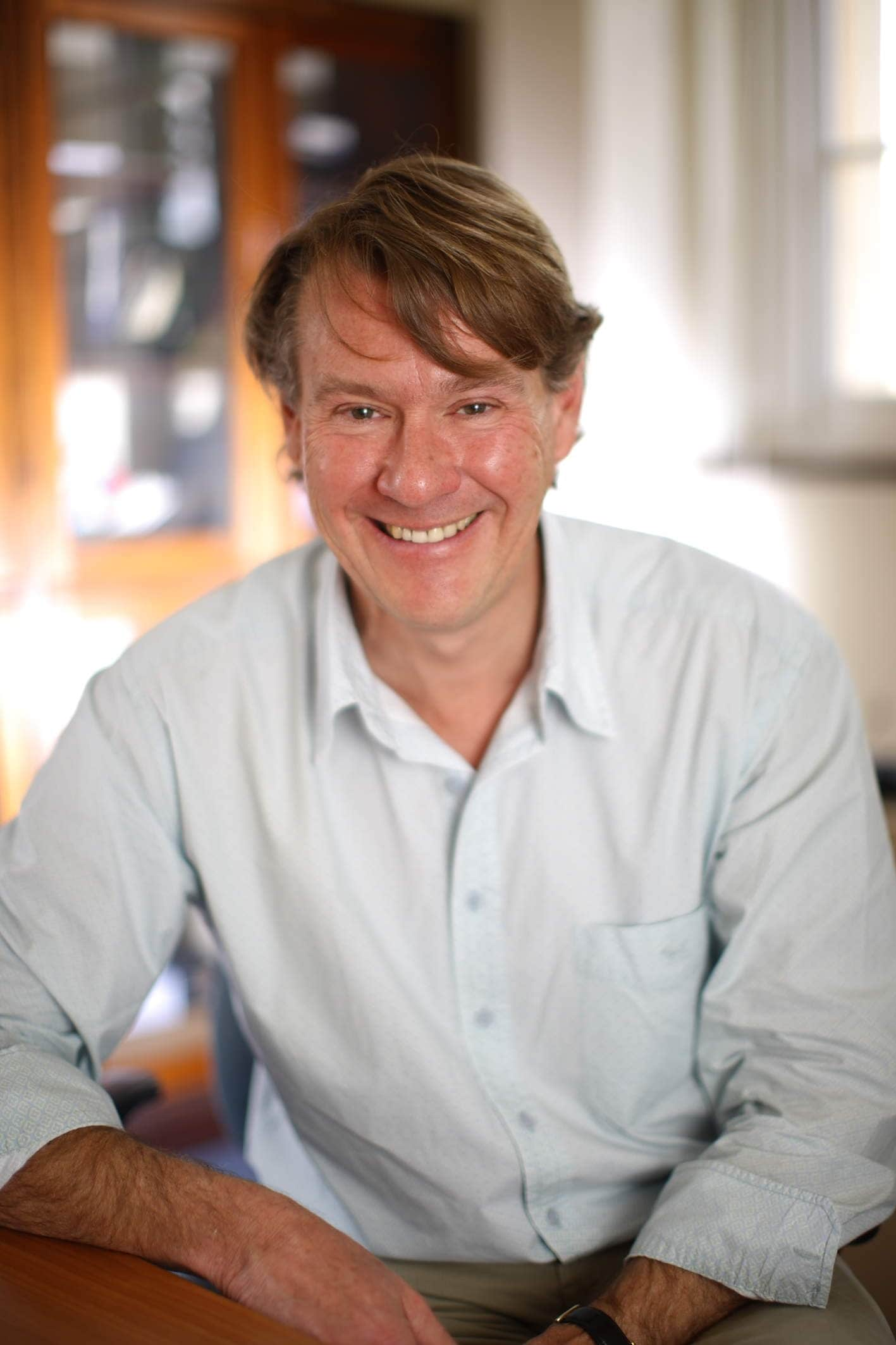
- Born: 26 June 1957
- Education: University of Queensland; King's College London
- Occupation: Entomologist
- Awards: Australian Laureate Fellowship (2009)
- Scientific career
- Fields: Entomology, nutrition
- Workplaces: Obesity Australia; Charles Perkins Centre
- Website: www.sydney.edu.au/science/about/our-people/academic-staff/stephen-simpson.html

Stephen James Simpson AC FAA FRSN FRS (born 26 June 1957) is an Australian scientist. He is the executive director of Obesity Australia and was the inaugural academic director of the Charles Perkins Centre at the University of Sydney until April 2025.

== Early life and education ==
Stephen James Simpson was born on 26 June 1957 in Melbourne, Australia. He graduated with a BSc from the University of Queensland in 1978, and completed his PhD at King's College London in 1982 on locust feeding physiology, called "The control of food intake in fifth-instar Locusta migratoria L. nymphs".

== Career ==
Simpson spent 22 years working at Oxford University, in Experimental Psychology, the Department of Zoology, and the University Museum of Natural History. He returned to Australia in 2005 as an ARC Federation Fellow, joining the School of Biological Sciences at the University of Sydney.

In 2018, Simpson became the executive director of Obesity Australia, the oversight body for the Collective for Action on Obesity, The Obesity Collective and was appointed academic director of the newly opened Charles Perkins Centre at Sydney University in June 2014, stepping down in April 2025.

== Other activities ==
Simpson co-wrote, narrated, and presented of the four-part ABC TV documentary series Great Southern Land, broadcast in September 2012. The series was directed by Luke Eve. He has also co-authored articles for newspapers, such as one about the "obesity crisis" in The Age in April 2015.

Simpson has co-authored two science communication books, The Nature of Nutrition: A Unifying Framework from Animal Adaptation to Human Obesity (Princeton University Press, October 2012), and Eat Like the Animals: what nature teaches us about the science of healthy eating (HarperCollins, March 2019), which has been translated into 10 languages.

== Awards and honours ==
- 2007: Fellow of the Australian Academy of Science
- 2009: Australian Laureate Fellowship
- 2009: NSW Scientist of the Year
- 2011: The Wigglesworth Memorial Lecture and Award, Royal Entomological Society
- 2016: Companion of the Order of Australia
- 2013: Fellow of the Royal Society
- 2013: Honorary Fellow of the Royal Entomological Society
- 2015: Fellow of the Royal Society of New South Wales
- 2022: Macfarlane Burnet Medal and Lecture
- 2023: Doctor of Science honoris causa, University of Glasgow
- 2024: The Wertheimer Award, World Obesity Federation
- 2024: The Ralph Slatyer Medal, Australian National University
