= Anthony William Linnane =

Australian biochemist

Anthony William Linnane AM FAA FRS FTSE
- Born: 17 July 1930; Sydney, New South Wales
- Died: 11 November 2017 (aged 87); Richmond, Melbourne, Victoria
- Education: University of Sydney (MSc, PhD)
- Known for: Accumulation of DNA mutations in mitochondria as a causal process in aging
- Children: Two
- Awards: Lemberg Medal of the Australian Biochemical Society
- Scientific career
- Fields: Biochemistry
- Workplaces: University of Wisconsin; University of Sydney; Monash University

Anthony William Linnane AM FAA FRS FTSE (1930–2017) was an Australian professor of biochemistry, known for his work on mitochondria.

== Career ==
Linnane's work investigated the biogenesis of mitochondria in yeast, the biosynthesis of mitochondrial enzymes, and the selective effects of antibiotics on protein synthesis in the mitochondria and cytoplasm. He is particularly well known for the hypothesis that the accumulation of DNA Mutation in mitochondria is a causal process in aging and degenerative disease.

Linnane became professor of biochemistry at Monash in 1965, and was Head of Biochemistry from 1991 to 1994. He was the founding director of the Centre for Molecular Biology and Medicine from 1983 until 1996, when he became emeritus professor.

Professor Linnane received the Lemberg Medal from the Australian Biochemical Society in 1973. He was elected to the Australian Academy of Science in 1972, to the Royal Society in 1980, and to the Australian Academy of Technological Sciences and Engineering in 1999. After a stint as Treasurer of the International Union of Biochemistry and Molecular Biology, he received that organization's Distinguished Service Award in 2000. He also served as President of both the Australian Biochemical Society and the Federation of Asian and Oceanic Biochemical Societies. He was appointed a member of the Order of Australia in 1995.
