= Mark Beretta =

Australian journalist (born 1966)

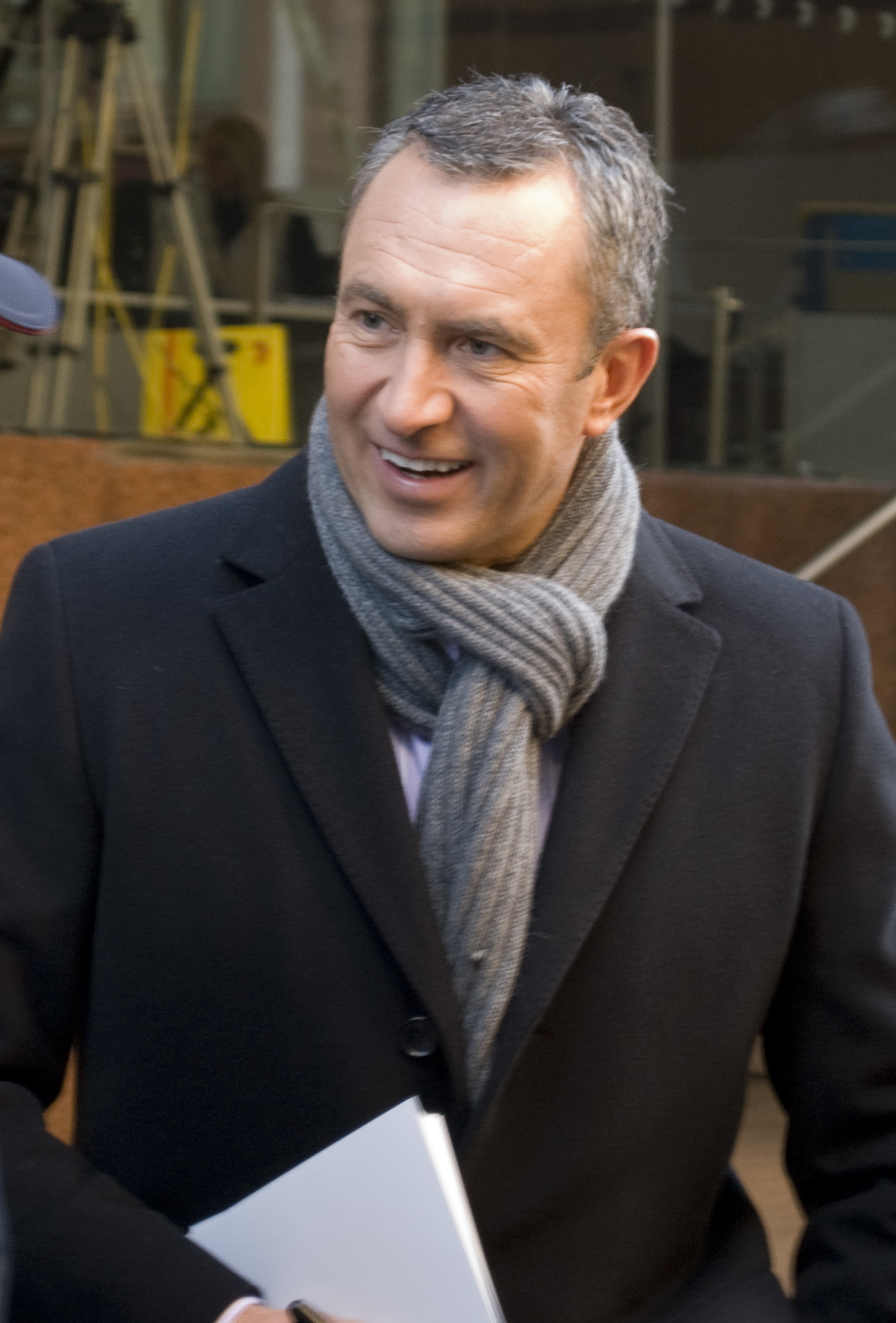
- Beretta in 2010
- Born: 16 June 1966 (age 60); Geelong, Victoria, Australia
- Spouse: Rachel Beretta (m. 2000; sep. 2023)
- Children: 2
- Military career
- Allegiance: Australia
- Branch: Australian Army Reserve
- Service years: 2019–present
- Rank: Major
- Awards: Medal of the Order of Australia
- Other work: Journalist, sports broadcaster, TV personality

Major Mark Beretta OAM (born 16 June 1966) is an Australian journalist, best known as a sports presenter on Seven Network program Sunrise, he has also been an officer in the Australian Army Reserve in public relations since 2019.

In July 2008, Beretta began presenting Seven Early News sport alongside Natalie Barr at 5:30 am, which leads into Sunrise, where he is still the sports presenter. Beretta joined with Tom Williams to host Rexona Australia's Greatest Athlete, in 2010. In 2011, he again hosted the show, this time alongside dual international Wendell Sailor.

== Career ==
Beretta formerly co-hosted Sunrise with current Nine News presenter Georgie Gardner from 2000 to 2002. From mid-2002 to 2004, he moved to presenting the sport on Seven News Sydney. In mid-2004, he was replaced by Sports Tonight presenter Matthew White; he subsequently moved to Sunrise where he was appointed sports presenter.

Beretta hosted the coverage of the 1998 Nagano, 2000 Sydney and 2002 Salt Lake City Olympic Games, as well as the 2002 Manchester Commonwealth Games.

In 2006, Beretta was the host of Seven Network's quiz show, The Master, which ran for only one episode on a Wednesday night at 8:30 pm before being burnt off in a Monday night timeslot during the 2006–07 non-ratings season.

From 2007 until 2014, Beretta was part of the Seven Network's V8 Supercar commentary team, working alongside Matthew White, Neil Crompton, Mark Skaife and Mark Larkham. Beretta returned to commentary in 2021 when Seven resumed coverage of the championship from previous broadcaster Network 10.

Beretta has also been a fill-in presenter on The Morning Show and Weekend Sunrise, and a fill-in sports presenter on Seven News in Sydney. In 2013, Beretta hosted Seven's coverage of the Australian Open.

In 2025, Beretta reduced his regular appearances on Sunrise, limiting his on-air presence to Monday and Friday. The change reflected a shift in his professional commitments, with greater focus on external projects such as charity work and special event coverage for the Seven Network.

On 27 November 2025, Beretta announced his resignation from Sunrise, with his final appearance scheduled for 12 December. He is expected to continue working with the Seven Network on special projects to be announced.

In September 2026, Beretta launched Beretts’ Best, a long‑form interview podcast featuring in‑depth conversations with prominent Australian sports and media figures.

== Publication ==
In October 2010, Beretta released his book The Riders – Australia's Motorcycle Champions through publisher HarperCollins. The Riders offers an insider's view of the world of motorcycle racing, with a collection of stories on 24 of Australia's greatest motorbike champions.

In October 2022, Beretta released the book 'Mark Beretta's Greatest Moments in Australian Sport' with Neil Cardigan, through publisher Affirm Press.

== Personal life ==
Beretta has two children.

Since 2010, he has regularly taken part in the 1,400 km (870 mi) Tour de Cure bike ride from Sydney to Mooloolaba over ten days, to raise money to help find a cure for cancer. In 2011, he was appointed to the board of Tour De Cure.

In 2019, Beretta joined the Australian Army Reserves.

In October 2023, Beretta separated from partner Rachel.

== Recognition and awards ==
Beretta was awarded the Medal of the Order of Australia in the 2021 Queen's Birthday Honours, for "service to the community through charitable organisations".
