= James Meadows Rendel (geneticist) =

Australian animal geneticist (1915–2001)

James Meadows Rendel (16 May 1915 - 4 February 2001) was an Australian agricultural scientist who specialised in animal genetics and was Chief of the CSIRO Division of Animal Genetics from 1959 to 1976. He was the grandson of Lytton Strachey's sister Dorothy Bussy, and the nephew of Frances Partridge.

== Early life ==
Rendel was the son of Col. Richard Meadows Rendel in Farnham, England and educated at Rugby School and University College London, where he completed his PhD as a student of the geneticist J. B. S. Haldane. His research was on the relationship between the size of duck eggs and their hatchability. He was interested in how selection pressures reduced the variability of a trait around a mean. During the Second World War he was attached to RAF Coastal Command, where he was involved in experiments on escape from submarines, one of which left him with permanent lung damage.

== Career ==
After the war Rendel moved to Edinburgh to do animal genetics research at Edinburgh University, where he was jointly in charge, along with Alan Robertson, of a project on dairy research, establishing the fundamental principles of artificial insemination in dairy progeny-testing programmes.

In 1951 he travelled to Australia to join CSIRO and establish a team at the University of Sydney to teach animal genetics and develop a research programme into animal breeding methods for domestic fowl, sheep, dairy and beef cattle. The team became the Animal Genetics Division of CSIRO in 1959. During that period he was a joint founder of the Genetics Society of Australia. In the 1960s he established a molecular biology group within the Animal Genetics Division, which later became the CSIRO Molecular and Cellular Biology Unit.

His personal interest was in breeding cattle to build up the livestock industry in the tropical and sub-tropical regions. This led to the breeding of the Belmont Red. When a new tropical beef-cattle research laboratory in Rockhampton coincided with his retirement, it was named the James Rendel Laboratory in honour of his contribution to the cattle industry.

== Later life ==
After retirement in 1980, Rendel moved to Drinkstone Green in Suffolk, England, where he bred Booroola sheep imported from Australia. However, seven years later he returned to continue his retirement in the Blue Mountains of Australia. He died there in 2001.

Rendel married twice, first to the poet Joan Adeney Easdale and secondly to Marie Tresham Davies. He had two sons and four daughters.

He was awarded the Macfarlane Burnet Medal and Lecture by the Australian Academy of Science in 1981.
