= Richard Harvey (scientist) =

Australian biologist

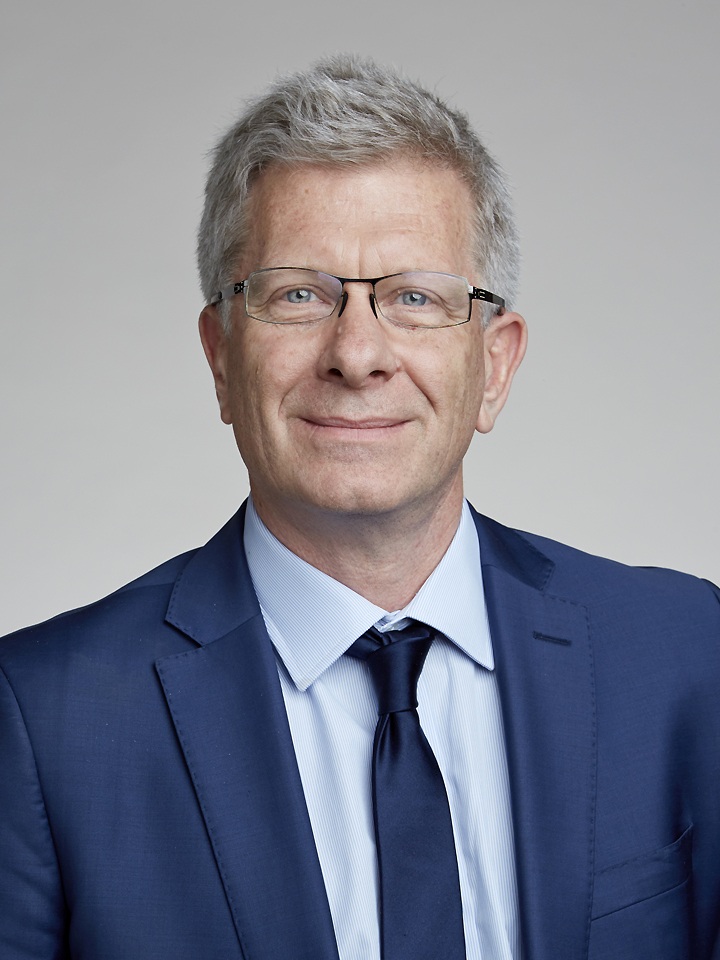
- Harvey in 2016
- Education: University of Adelaide (PhD)
- Awards: EMBO Member, Fellow of the Royal Society
- Scientific career
- Fields: Molecular biology Embryology
- Workplaces: Victor Chang Cardiac Research Institute; University of New South Wales; Walter and Eliza Hall Institute of Medical Research
- Thesis: The isolation and characterisation of chicken histone genes (1981)
- Doctoral advisor: J.R.E. Wells
- Website: victorchang.edu.au/about-us/our-scientists/prof-richard-harvey

Richard Paul Harvey is a molecular biologist, the Sir Peter Finley professor of Heart Research at the University of New South Wales and Deputy Director and Head of the Developmental and Stem Cell Biology Division at the Victor Chang Cardiac Research Institute.

== Education ==
Harvey was educated at the University of Adelaide, where he received his PhD in 1982 for research on histone genes supervised by J.R.E. Wells.

== Career and research ==
Following his PhD, Harvey was a postdoctoral researcher in embryology at Harvard University with Douglas A. Melton, and then moved to the Walter and Eliza Hall Institute of Medical Research in Melbourne, establishing an independent group. In 1998, he relocated to the Victor Chang Cardiac Research Institute, where he is Co-Deputy Director and Head of the Developmental and Stem Cell Biology Division.

His research focuses on the genetic basis of heart development, pathological mechanisms underlying congenital heart disease, biology and origins of adult cardiac stem cells, and cardiac regeneration.

== Awards and honours ==
Harvey is an elected Fellow of the Australian Academy of Science and was elected a Member of the European Molecular Biology Organization (EMBO) in 1988. He has been awarded the Julian Wells Medal, President's Medal (Australia and New Zealand Society of Cell and Developmental Biology) and Lemberg Medal (Australian Society for Biochemistry and Molecular Biology), and New South Wales Ministerial Prize for Cardiovascular Research. He was elected a Fellow of the Royal Society (FRS) in 2016.

In 2017 Harvey was appointed a Member of the Order of Australia for significant service to medicine in the field of cell biology and cardiovascular research, and through scientific leadership roles.
