= Lemberg Medal =

Australian award for excellence in biochemistry and molecular biology

The Lemberg Medal, named after Max Rudolf Lemberg, the first president of the Australian Society for Biochemistry and Molecular Biology (ASBMB), is awarded annually to a scientist who has been a member for five or more years and who has "demonstrated excellence in Biochemistry and Molecular Biology and who has made significant contributions to the scientific community". The winner presents the Lemberg Lecture at the following ASBMB annual conference.

== Recipients ==
Source: Lemberg Medallists, Australian Society for Biochemistry and Molecular Biology

| Year | Recipient |
|---|---|
| 1968 | Frank William Ernest Gibson |
| 1969 | Norman Boardman |
| 1970 | Alexander George Ogston |
| 1971 | Gordon Leslie Ada |
| 1972 | No award |
| 1973 | Anthony William Linnane |
| 1974 | Marshall Davidson Hatch |
| 1975 | William Herdman Elliott |
| 1976 | George Ernest Rogers |
| 1977 | Lawrence Walter Nichol |
| 1978 | William James Peacock |
| 1979 | Burt Zerner |
| 1980 | D. B. Keech |
| 1981 | Robert Gerard Wake |
| 1982 | No award |
| 1983 | Joan Mary Anderson |
| 1984 | J. F. Williams |
| 1985 | Robert Henry Symons |
| 1986 | Jerry McKee Adams |
| 1987 | J. F. Morrison |
| 1988 | Peter Malcolm Colman |
| 1989 | Julian R. E. Wells |
| 1990 | Thomas John Martin |
| 1991 | Alfred James Pittard |
| 1992 | W. Gerlach |
| 1993 | Graeme Barry Cox |
| 1994 | F. J. Ballard |
| 1995 | Suzanne Cory |
| 1996 | Bruce Ernest Kemp |
| 1997 | Robert Charles Baxter |
| 1998 | Elizabeth Salisbury Dennis |
| 1999 | Philip William Kuchel |
| 2000 | John C. Wallace |
| 2001 | Phillip Nagley |
| 2002 | Philip G. Board |
| 2003 | John Hopwood |
| 2004 | Nicholas Hoogenraad |
| 2005 | Ian Young |
| 2006 | Alan Frederick Cowman |
| 2007 | Colin Wesley Ward |
| 2008 | David Laurence Vaux |
| 2009 | Peter Koopman |
| 2010 | Richard Paul Harvey |
| 2011 | Michael Parker |
| 2012 | Douglas James Hilton |
| 2013 | Sharad Kumar |
| 2014 | Marilyn Anderson |
| 2015 | Christina Anne Mitchell |
| 2016 | Jane Visvader |
| 2017 | John Mattick |
| 2018 | Jamie Rossjohn |
| 2019 | Maria Kavallaris |
| 2020 | Trevor Lithgow |
| 2021 | Merlin Crossley |
| 2022 | Leann Tilley |
| 2023 | Michael T. Ryan |
| 2024 | Anthony S. Weiss |
| 2025 | Michelle Haber |
| 2026 | David James |
