= Jeune Fille Endormie =

Painting by Pablo Picasso

- Artist: Pablo Picasso
- Year: 1935
- Medium: Oil on canvas
- Dimensions: 46.3 cm × 55 cm (18.2 in × 22 in)
- Location: Private collection

Jeune Fille Endormie is a 1935 oil on canvas painting by Spanish painter Pablo Picasso depicting his model and lover, Marie-Thérèse Walter, as she slept. It was sold at Christie's auction house in London in 2011 for nearly £13.5 million after being donated to the University of Sydney by an anonymous American donor.

== Background ==
Jeune Fille Endormie is rarely seen in public. The only time it has been previously available for viewing was in 1939 when owner Walter P. Chrysler Jr. lent it to the Museum of Modern Art in New York City for a retrospective of Picasso's work.

It was donated to the University of Sydney by an anonymous American donor and was sent to be sold at Christie's auction house in London in June 2011. While it was expected to sell for up to £12 million, it actually sold for nearly £13.5 million, with the proceeds going toward a A$400m (£260m) research center. The donor had made her donation conditional upon the painting being immediately sold with proceeds going toward research; she delivered it personally, having flown from overseas with the painting in her hand-luggage. An additional ten paintings were also donated, along with items of jewelry. Tim Dolan, director of development for the university reported that as the donor handed over the painting, she said, "When you own a valuable painting like this, it sort of owns you back. For the first time in a long, long while, I finally feel free."

== Description ==
Jeune Fille Endormie is one of many paintings Picasso made of his lover, Marie-Thérèse Walter. It is tightly focused on the sleeping head of Marie-Thérèse, with her body painted in an incandescent array of colors. It was completed and signed by Picasso on 3 February 1935. The painting is signed by Picasso on the upper left and measures 46.3 cm x 55 cm.
