= Children's Cancer Institute =

Australian medical research institute

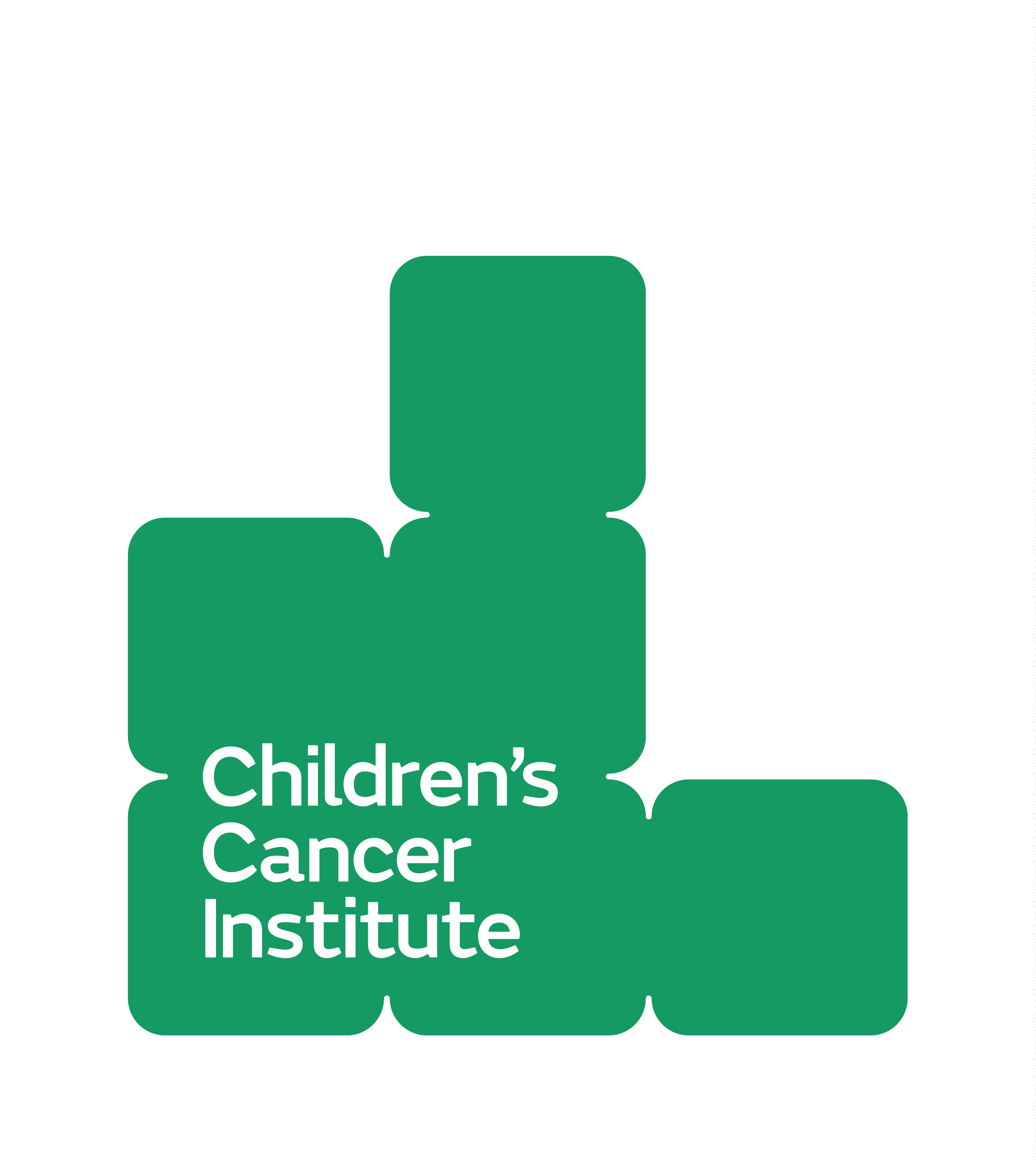
- Motto: Curing childhood cancer. It's not if. It's when.
- Established: 1976; 50 years ago
- Mission: Translational medical research
- Focus: Childhood cancer
- Executive Director: Michelle Haber AM
- Faculty: University of New South Wales
- Adjunct faculty: Sydney Children's Hospital
- Staff: approx. 200
- Location: Level 5, C25 Lowy Cancer Research Centre, High Street, Randwick, Sydney, New South Wales, Australia
- Coordinates: 33°55′00″S 151°14′08″E
- Interactive map of Children's Cancer Institute
- Website: ccia.org.au

Children's Cancer Institute is an Australian medical research institute wholly dedicated to the prevention and treatment of childhood cancer. Established in 1976, the Institute is affililiated with both the University of New South Wales and Sydney Children's Hospital and is located in Randwick, Sydney, New South Wales.

The Institute has been led by Professor Michelle Haber AM since its establishment.

== History ==
In 1975, Jack Kasses and John Lough met in the waiting room of Sydney Children's Hospital where their daughter and son respectively were undergoing treatment for leukaemia. Lough approached the Apex Club in Wollongong to raise money for cancer research. They started the "Help a Kid Make It" campaign – with a target of $1 million to facilitate research into childhood cancer.

The Children's Leukaemia and Cancer Foundation was established in May 1976. The foundation evolved into Children's Cancer Institute, which opened its own research laboratories in 1984. The first scientists to join the Institute were Haber, who is now the Executive Director, Murray Norris AM, now the Deputy Director, and Maria Kavallaris, now Program Head, Tumour Biology & Targeting.

== Research focus ==
The Institute is grouped into four main research units focused on the prevention and treatment of childhood cancer and include understanding childhood cancer, improving diagnosis, finding better treatments, and improving life after cancer.

== Achievements ==
- Launched Zero Childhood Cancer program for the most serious cases of infant, childhood and adolescent cancer
- Researchers showed a recently developed drug to have potential against an aggressive subtype of acute lymphoblastic leukaemia
- Scientists identified a critical molecular 'feedback loop' that helps initiate and drive neuroblastoma, and an experimental drug with the potential to interrupt the loop and halt tumour progression
- Opened a new international clinical trial for aggressive relapsed neuroblastoma
- A novel test developed that doubled the survival rate from 35 per cent to 70 per cent for high-risk acute lymphoblastic leukaemia

== Fundraising initiatives ==
The Institute undertakes a range of fundraising initiatives including 'Build for a Cure', where a newly-constructed and fully furnished home in Glenmore Park was sold at auction in 2014 for A$783,000. Scott Cam was an ambassador for the initiative.

The Institute is also the beneficiary of many events held annually throughout Australia.

== See also ==
- Health in Australia
