= UNSW Lowy Cancer Research Centre =

Australian cancer research facility

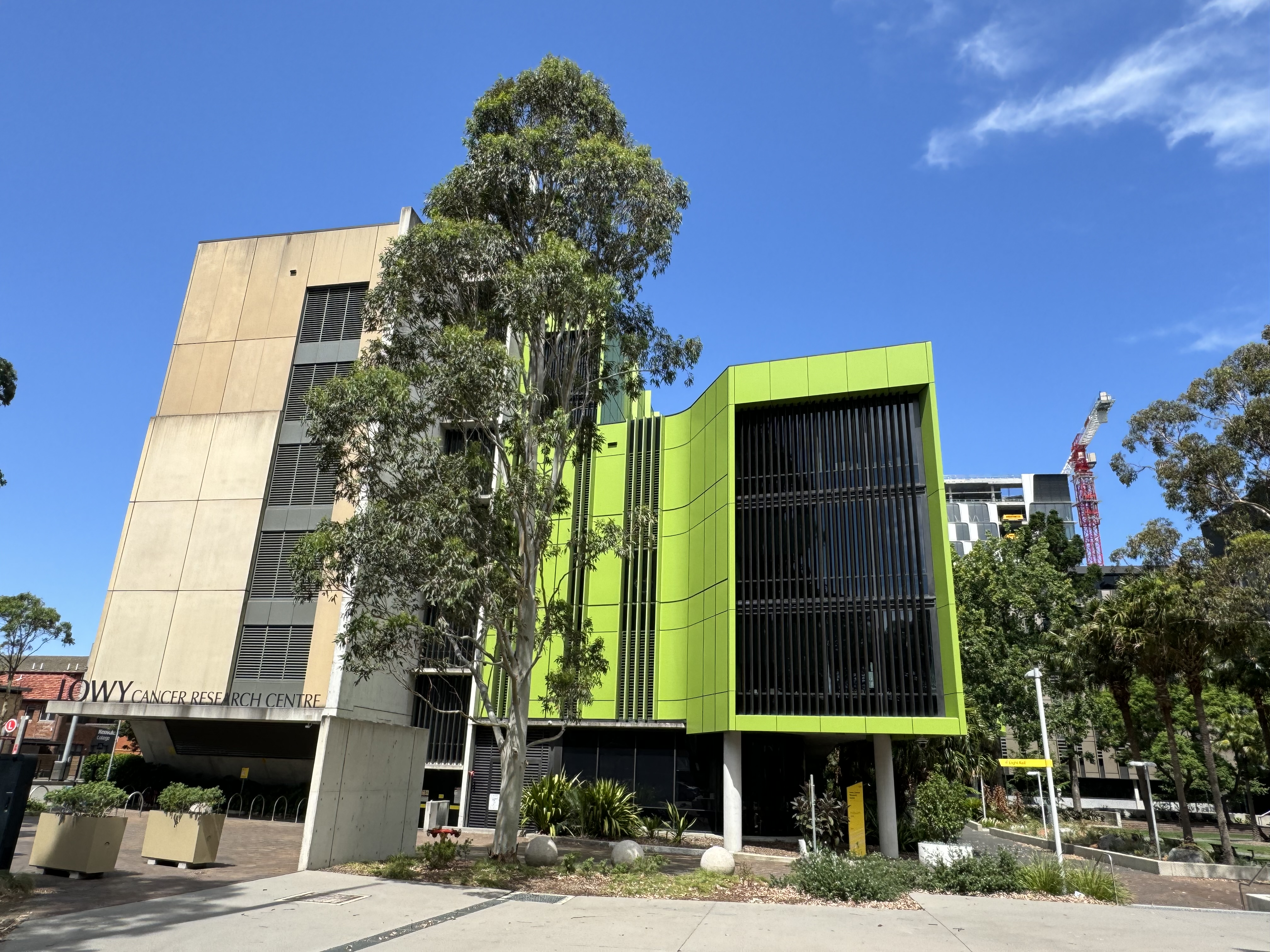
- Motto: Giving hope through collaboration
- Established: 28 May 2010
- Director: Professor Philip Hogg
- Faculty: UNSW Sydney
- Adjunct faculty: Children's Cancer Institute
- Location: Corner of Botany and High Streets, Randwick, New South Wales, Australia
- Website: www.lowycancerresearchcentre.unsw.edu.au

The Lowy Cancer Research Centre is a facility at The University of New South Wales. It is Australia's first facility bringing together researchers in childhood and adult cancers, and one of the country's largest cancer research facilities, housing up to 400 researchers. The centre, named for businessman Frank Lowy, who donated $10 million towards the project, was officially opened on 28 May 2010. It is home to researchers from the UNSW Faculty of Medicine and Children's Cancer Institute Australia. The inaugural director is Professor Philip Hogg, winner of the Cancer Institute NSW Premier's Award for Outstanding Cancer Research in 2009.

== Building facilities ==
The Lowy Cancer Research Centre was built with funding from numerous private and government organisations, including Frank Lowy, who gifted $10 million; the Australian Government, that granted $13.3 million; the Australian Cancer Research Foundation (ACRF), that granted $3.1 million for the establishment of the ACRF Drug Discovery Centre for Childhood Cancer; and the bulk of the $127 million cost was generated from the sale of the Little Bay sporting fields at UNSW, which were sold for $103 million. Lahznimmo Architects, in association with Wilson Architects, designed The Lowy Cancer Research Centre with environmental sustainability in mind.

=== Official opening ===
The centre was officially opened on 28 May 2010 by the Prime Minister Kevin Rudd and the NSW Premier Kristina Keneally. At the official opening Rudd said:

To take us further we need research. And that is where the Lowy Centre will come into its own.

— Kevin Rudd, Prime Minister of Australia, May 2010

== Research impact ==
=== Lowy Cancer Symposium ===
The Lowy Cancer Symposium is a biennial cancer conference, hosted by the Lowy Cancer Research Centre in Sydney. Designed for basic research scientists, oncologists and other healthcare professionals, this cancer symposium is Australia's only Cancer Drug Discovery Symposium and focuses on the three key phases of cancer therapeutic development: discovery, pre-clinical and clinical.

The symposium brings together Australian and international leading cancer researchers to discuss real-time breakthroughs in cancer treatments and cures.

The first Lowy Cancer Symposium with the theme Discovering Cancer Therapeutics was held on 16–18 May 2010 leading up to the official opening of the new Centre. Among the notable guests were Nobel Laureate K Barry Sharpless, Vishva Dixit, and Nicholas Dracopoli.

Launch celebrations for the new ACRF Drug Discovery for Childhood Cancer, which is housed in the Lowy Cancer Research Centre, were also held during the symposium.

The second Lowy Cancer Symposium was held 15–17 May 2013 at UNSW, highlighting Australasia's cancer research breakthroughs and showcasing some of the best international cancer research, including an address from Dr Lewis Cantley, director of the Cancer Center at Weill Cornell Medical College in New York.

== See also ==
- Health in Australia
