= Maria Kavallaris =

Australian cancer researcher

Professor Maria Kavallaris AM FAHMS FRSN

Personal details
- Occupation: Medical researcher

Maria Kavallaris is an Australian scientist, based at the University of New South Wales' Children's Cancer Institute, where she is best known for her contributions to the field of cancer research. On 25 January 2019, Kavallaris was appointed a member of the Order of Australia.

== Early life and education ==
Kavallaris was born in Australia, and is of Greek and Cypriot descent. She returned to Morphou, Cyprus, with her family while still in primary school. Soon after, Cyprus was invaded by Turkey, forcing her family to flee for safety to Kavallaris' maternal great-grandparents' house in the mountains. Four weeks later, Kavallaris' family headed to a British base, were airlifted to the UK, and then returned to Australia again (1974).

In grade 10, Kavallaris left high school to complete a pathology technician course. She then pursued a Bachelor of Applied Science at the University of Technology Sydney, where she was also working in the laboratory of Alan Pettigrew. In 1983, when she was 21, Kavallaris was diagnosed with a rare form of ovarian cancer. While undergoing chemotherapy, she decided to complete her undergraduate degree and pursue a PhD in cancer research.

During the first year of her PhD at the University of New South Wales, Kavallaris's 30-year-old brother was diagnosed with pancreatic cancer and died within six weeks.

== Research career ==
Following her PhD, Kavallaris worked at the Albert Einstein College of Medicine in New York, U.S.A., as an IARC Cancer Research Fellow where she made significant contributions towards understanding the role of cytoskeleton proteins in tumour growth and cancer cell survival. She then returned to Australia to work at the newly opened University of New South Wales' Children's Cancer Institute in 1984, where her research focuses on childhood cancer. This has involved using nanotechnology to develop cancer therapies, and to determine mechanisms which lead to anti-cancer drug resistance.

Kavallaris is a founding Director of the Australian Centre for Nanomedicine that she established in 2011. She is also the head of the Translational Cancer Nanomedicine Theme at the University of New South Wales' Children's Cancer Institute. She is co-Chair of the Australian Institute for Policy and Science, and past President and Life Member of the Australian Society for Medical Research.

Kavallaris has received over $40 million in research funding, and has trained over 50 students. She has an h-index and i10-index of 59 and 132 respectively, and has been cited over 12,400 times.

On 25 January 2019, Kavallaris was appointed a member of the Order of Australia. She is a Fellow of the Royal Society of New South Wales (FRSN) and Fellow of the Australian Academy of Health and Medical Sciences. She was also recognized as one of the 100 Influential Women in Oncology by OncoDaily.

== Awards ==
- Young Tall Poppy Award (2004)
- Australian Museum Eureka Prize (2007)
- Knowledge Nation 100 Award (2015)
- The Australian Financial Review and Westpac 100 Women of Influence Award (2015)
- Fellow of the Australian Academy of Health and Medical Sciences (2016)
- Fellow of the Royal Society of New South Wales (2019)
- NSW Premier's Science and Engineering Prize for Leadership in Innovation (2017)
- UTS Chancellor's Alumni Excellence Award (2019) and UTS Alumni Excellence Award – Science (2019)
- Lemberg Medal ASBMB (2019)
- Member of the Order of Australia (2019)
- NSW Premier's Woman of the Year Award (2020)
- Eureka Prize for Innovative Use of Technology, with Justin Gooding, Julio Ribeiro, Aidan O'Mahony, Robert Utama and Lakmali Atapattu (2021)

== Selected bibliography ==
- Maria Kavallaris, Dennis Y-S Kuo, Catherine A Burkhart, Donna Lee Regl, Murray D Norris, Michelle Haber and Susan Band Horwitz. Taxol-resistant epithelial ovarian tumors are associated with altered expression of specific beta-tubulin isotypes. The Journal of Clinical Investigation. 1997.
- KM Murphy, V Ranganathan, ML Farnsworth, M Kavallaris and Richard B Lock. Bcl-2 inhibits Bax translocation from cytosol to mitochondria during drug-induced apoptosis of human tumor cells. Cell Death and Differentiation. 2000.
- Pei Pei Gan, Eddy Pasquier and Maria Kavallaris. Class III β-tubulin mediates sensitivity to chemotherapeutic drugs in non–small cell lung cancer. Cancer Research. 2007.
- Eddy Pasquier, Maria Kavallaris and Nicolas André. Metronomic chemotherapy: new rationale for new directions. Nature Reviews Clinical Oncology. 2010.
- Maria Kavallaris. Microtubules and resistance to tubulin-binding agents. Nature Reviews Cancer. 2010.
