= Frank William Ernest Gibson =

Australian biochemist and molecular biologist

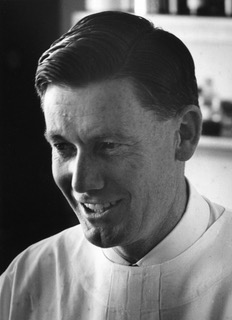
Frank Gibson in 1971

Frank William Ernest Gibson AM FAA FRS (22 July 1923 – 11 July 2008) was an Australian biochemist and molecular biologist, Howard Florey Professor of Medical Research in the John Curtin School of Medical Research, and a Fellow of the Royal Society of London He undertook his most notable work at the University of Melbourne. He and his research group were responsible for the discovery of chorismic acid. He later worked at The Australian National University (ANU).

== Background and education ==
Frank Gibson was born in Melbourne in 1923 to John William Gibson and Alice Ruby Gibson. His father was a foreman stevedore working for Adelaide Steamship Company, unloading coal. He had two sisters, Enid and Joan.:

Gibson left school at the age of 14 and went to Collingwood Technical College with a view to training as a draughtsman. Several people from Collingwood Tech went to work in the Bacteriology Department at the University of Melbourne and Gibson secured a job there himself. His work eventually involved preparing medium and setting up laboratory equipment for the undergraduate students. . He was placed in the research group in the Bacteriology Department and worked for Sid Rubbo who collaborated with Adrien Albert in Sydney.

He was encouraged to start a Diploma of Chemistry in the Working Men's College now Royal Melbourne Institute of Technology. In 1939, he was given the opportunity to go to the University of Queensland as a technician in a new Bacteriology Department. The job included the opportunity to study in the University, and complete the first two years of a science course by night-time study over 4 years. Gibson had never matriculated so a year was spent doing subjects required to achieve matriculation.

However, World War II intervened. As a laboratory technician, Gibson was in a reserved occupation so while he was trying to enlist, the university was trying to get him back out. Eventually he was credited with 286 days of ‘active service in Australia’. He returned to Melbourne where he completed his BSc. . During this period he started to do some independent research which was published. He applied for an ANU scholarship to do a DPhil at Oxford as, at that time, no science doctorates were being offered in Australia. Despite being rejected at first, the application was finally approved.

In 1949, he went to Oxford where to work with D D Woods. His wife, Margaret was also a Science graduate from University of Queensland, and was undertaking a DPhil with Cyril Norman Hinshelwood's physical chemistry group. Gibson's work on the biochemistry of amino acids included the use of normal and mutant bacterial cells, resulting in the completion of his work and a successful DPhil examination by Rudolph Peters and Hans Krebs in 1953.

He was offered a senior lecturer's position back at the University of Melbourne in 1953, where he continued his scientific research and was awarded a DSc in 1964. He was appointed to a personal chair in Chemical Microbiology at the University of Melbourne in 1965. During this time that he, his wife Margaret and his research group discovered chorismic acid. Gibson described the naming of chorismic acid"

‘My father-in-law, a clergyman in the Church of England, was a Greek scholar. I wrote to him outlining the situation - that we had a pathway and a branch point - and he suggested several words from a Biblical quotation which I think has to do with St Barnabas and the young St Luke. That they “ parted asunder” was the important thing, and he suggested “apochorismate” or “chorismic” or words like that. I chose “chorismic” because “apo” has chemical connotations and one could confuse it.’

In 1966, Gibson was appointed to the Chair of Biochemistry. in the appointed in the JohnCurtin school of the Australian National University. He was permitted him to bring members of his Melbourne research team. He and his family, 5 of his researchers and their families, all moved to Canberra in consequence of that appointment, and the work that his team had been doing in Melbourne was continued in Canberra. They continued to explore the biochemistry of chorismic acid and of its many metabolites including ubiquinone, central to the field of bioenergetics. His work on adenosine triphosphate (ATP) led to a close collaboration with Graeme Cox (subsequently a professor in the John Curtin School) for a period of many years. He was Professor of Biochemistry in The John Curtin School of Medical Research from 1967-1976 and 1980-1988. From 1977-1980, he was Director and Howard Florey Professor of Medical Research in the John Curtin School.

== Honours ==
In 1971 Gibson was elected Fellow of the Australian Academy of Science and in 1976 was elected Fellow of the Royal Society of London. In 2004 he was appointed a Member of the Order of Australia.

Other honours and awards include:

Carnegie Foundation Travel Grant, 1959

David Syme Medal - Syme Prize for Research, University of Melbourne 1963

Lemberg Medal and Lecture Australian Biochemical Society 1968

S.D. Sydney Rubbo Memorial Oration Australian Society for Microbiology 1975

Frederick Gowland Hopkins Medal The Biochemical Society (UK) 1981

Leeuwenhoek Medal and Lecture - Royal Society of London (London, Manchester and Durham) 1981

Newton-Abraham Visiting Professor (Oxford) 1982-1983 and Fellow, Lincoln College

Vice-President Australian Academy of Science 1989-1990

Biochemistry Alumni Lecturer, University of Queensland 1990

Frank Macfarlane Burnet Medal and Lecture - Australian Academy of Science 1991

Emeritus Professor, ANU 1989

University Fellow, ANU 1989-1991

Visiting Fellow, Membrane Biochemistry Group, John Curtin School of Medical Research, ANU

Awarded Centenary Medal (Commonwealth of Australia) 2001

Appointed Member of the Order of Australia 2004

== Personal life ==
In 1949, he married Margaret Isabel Nancy Burvill - two daughters, Frances Joan Gibson born 1957, Ruth Enid Gibson 1960-2004. Frances Gibson is a member of the independent band The Cannanes The Cannanes In 1980, he married lawyer, Robin Margaret Barker (née Rollason) - one son, Mark William Gibson born 1982.
