= Prochirality =

Ability of an achiral molecule to be made chiral in one step

An sp^{2}-hybridized carbon atom, with re and si faces

In stereochemistry, prochiral molecules are those that can be converted from achiral to chiral in a single step, such as changing one atom. An achiral species which can be converted to a chiral in two steps is called proprochiral.

A molecule having only one plane of symmetry, or an inversion point and no plane of symmetry, is prochiral if it is possible to change one of the two sides or to destroy the symmetry in another way. But a molecule with more symmetry, such as ethane, may require two substitutions to become chiral, and is thus proprochiral. Methane requires three substitutions to become chiral.

If two identical substituents are attached to an sp^{3}-hybridized atom, the descriptors pro-R and pro-S are used to distinguish between the two. Promoting the pro-R substituent to higher priority than the other identical substituent results in an R chirality center at the original sp^{3}-hybridized atom, and analogously for the pro-S substituent.

A trigonal planar sp^{2}-hybridized atom can be converted to a chiral center when a substituent is added to the re or si (from Latin rectus 'right' and sinister 'left') face of the molecule. A face is labeled re if, when looking at that face, the substituents at the trigonal atom are arranged in increasing Cahn-Ingold-Prelog priority order (1 to 2 to 3) in a clockwise order, and si if the priorities increase in anti-clockwise order; note that the designation of the resulting chiral center as S or R depends on the priority of the incoming group.

The concept of prochirality is necessary for understanding some aspects of enzyme stereospecificity. Alexander Ogston pointed out that when a symmetrical molecule is placed in an asymmetric environment, such as the surface of an enzyme, supposedly identically placed groups become distinguishable. In this way he showed that earlier exclusion of non-chiral citrate as a possible intermediate in the tricarboxylate cycle was mistaken.

Another biochemical example of prochirality is glycerol. It is achiral, but when it is phosphorylated (at carbon number 3 in stereospecific numbering) the molecule becomes the chiral glycerol 3-phosphate, also called L-α-glycerophosphoric acid. A triacylglycerol having the same fatty acid at carbon 1 and carbon 3 is achiral, but when one of these two is released by hydrolysis, the resulting diacylglycerol is chiral.
