= Centenary Institute =

Australian medical research institute

Centenary Institute of Cancer Medicine and Cell Biology
- Motto: Life Saving Research.
- Established: 1982; 44 years ago
- Chair: Joseph Carrozzi
- Director: Professor Marc Pellegrini
- Faculty: Sydney Medical School, University of Sydney
- Adjunct faculty: Royal Prince Alfred Hospital
- Location: Camperdown, Sydney, New South Wales, Australia
- Website: www.centenary.org.au

The Centenary Institute of Cancer Medicine and Cell Biology, commonly referred to as the Centenary Institute or Centenary, is an Australian medical research institute located at the Camperdown campus of the University of Sydney, in Sydney, New South Wales. The research programs at Centenary focus on a diverse range of human health issues including cancer, cardiovascular disease, genetic diseases, immunology, infectious diseases and liver disease.

Over its history, Centenary has achieved the following outcomes in medicine and public health:

- Uncovered new approaches to treating breast cancer that have caused an increase in the survival rate.
- Prevention of sudden cardiac death through early diagnosis and treatment.
- High success rate of liver transplants.
- Improved prognosis for patients with liver cancer and hepatitis C.
- Improvement in the treatment of haemophilia.
- Developed new ways of detecting a person's propensity to develop asthma and inflammatory bowel disease.

== History ==
Established in 1982, the founding director of the institute was Professor Tony Basten AO (1989-2005).

== See also ==
- Health in Australia
