= Australian Society for Biochemistry and Molecular Biology =

Australian academic society

- Founded: 1955
- Founder: Rudi Lemberg
- Website: www.asbmb.org.au

The Australian Society for Biochemistry and Molecular Biology (ASBMB) is an academic society founded in 1955. Originally named Australian Biochemical Society, it was renamed to its current title in 1990. Its main activities include hosting scientific conferences, supporting ancillary symposia, workshops and publishing an educational magazine.

== History ==
Biochemical research in Australia began in the 1920s in the Australian national science agency Council for Scientific and Industrial Research (now the CSIRO). The first university biochemistry department then started at the University of Adelaide under Thorburn Brailsford Robertson. There was initially a joint biochemistry and physiology section within the Australian and New Zealand Association for the Advancement of Science.

The society began in 1955 as the Australian Biochemical Society, with Rudi Lemberg as its founding president. It was based on Lemberg's experience with the British Biochemical Society and Hugh Ennor's meetings with the International Union of Biochemistry and relevant university department heads in Australia. Additional key initial members included Frederick Collins as treasurer and Victor Trikojus in a recruitment role.

== Meetings and activities ==
ASBMB has hosted a yearly meeting each year since 1956. It has also coordinated the joint ComBio meeting with societies in related research fields since 1999. It also supports smaller special interest group meetings, symposia, workshops, conferences, and school science competitions.

== Publications ==
The society publishes the magazine Australian Biochemist with three issues per year. The publication started in 1998, following on from the ABS/ASBMB newsletter, which was started in 1970.

== Awards ==
ASBMB gives out an array of annual awards in different categories.

- Lemberg Medal - after 5 years' membership for significant contribution
- Shimadzu Research Medal - within 15 years post-PhD graduation
- Eppendorf Edman ECR Award - within 7 years post-PhD
- SDR Scientific Education Award - education (especially innovation and creativity)
- Boomerang Award - for expatriate Australians to return to present at the ASBMB conference and seminars at universities/institutes.

The society also awards fellowships to researchers within 2 years post-PhD.
