= List of fellows of the Australian Academy of Science =

Fellowship of the Australian Academy of Science is made up of about 500 Australian scientists.

Scientists judged by their peers to have made an exceptional contribution to knowledge in their field may be elected to Fellowship of the Academy. Fellows are often denoted using the post-nominal FAA (Fellow of the Australian Academy of Science).

A small number of distinguished foreign scientists with substantial connections to Australian science are elected as Corresponding Members.

Fellows are appointed for life; this table also contains deceased fellows.

== Fellows ==
Yr	Fellow	Notes	Born	Died	Refs
1953	Keith Edward Bullen	Mathematics and geophysics	1906	1976	Foundation Fellow
1953	Frank Macfarlane Burnet	Virology and immunology (Nobel laureate)	1899	1985	Foundation Fellow
1953	David Catcheside	Genetics	1907	1994	Foundation Fellow
1953	Thomas MacFarland Cherry	Mathematics	1898	1966	Foundation Fellow
1953	Ian Clunies Ross	Parasitology and science administration	1899	1959	Foundation Fellow
1953	Edmund Alfred Cornish	Statistics	1909	1973	Foundation Fellow
1953	John Eccles	Neurophysiologist (Nobel laureate)	1903	1997	Foundation Fellow
1953	Edwin Sherbon Hills	Geologist	1906	1986	Foundation Fellow
1953	Leonard Huxley	Physicist	1902	1988	Foundation Fellow
1953	Raymond Le Fèvre	Chemist	1905	1986	Foundation Fellow
1953	Rudi Lemberg	Biochemist	1896	1975	Foundation Fellow
1953	Hedley Marston	Biochemist	1900	1965	Foundation Fellow
1953	Leslie Martin	Physicist	1900	1983	Foundation Fellow
1953	David Martyn	Physicist and radiographer	1906	1970	Foundation Fellow
1953	Douglas Mawson	Geologist	1882	1958	Foundation Fellow
1953	Alexander John Nicholson	Entomologist	1895	1969	Foundation Fellow
1953	Mark Oliphant	Physicist	1901	2000	Foundation Fellow
1953	Joseph Lade Pawsey	Radiophysics and radio astronomy	1908	1962	Foundation Fellow
1953	James Arthur Prescott	Agricultural science	1890	1987	Foundation Fellow
1953	David Rivett	Chemist	1885	1961	Foundation Fellow
1953	Thomas Gerald Room	Mathematics	1902	1986	Foundation Fellow
1953	Sydney Sunderland	Medicine	1910	1993	Foundation Fellow
1953	Oscar Werner Tiegs	Zoologist	1897	1956	Foundation Fellow
1953	Richard Woolley	Astronomer	1906	1986	Foundation Fellow
1954	John Stuart Anderson	Inorganic chemist	1908	1990	
1954	Eric Stephen Barnes	Pure mathematics (Adelaide)	1924	2000	
1954	Philip Baxter	Chemical engineer	1905	1989	
1954	Noel Bayliss	Chemist	1906	1996	
1954	Arthur Birch	Organic chemist	1915	1995	
1954	Walter Boas	Metallurgist	1904	1982	
1954	William Rowan Browne	Geologist	1884	1975	
1954	Lionel Bull	Veterinary scientist	1889	1978	
1954	Frederick Colin Courtice	Pathologist	1911	1992	
1954	Hugh Ennor	Biochemist	1912	1977	
1954	Frank Fenner	Virologist	1914	2010	
1954	Otto Frankel	Geneticist	1900	1998	
1954	Alfred Gottschalk	Biochemist	1894	1973	
1954	Herbert Sydney Green	Physicist	1920	1999	
1954	Arthur Robert Hogg	Physicist and astronomer	1903	1966	
1954	John Conrad Jaeger	Mathematical physicist	1907	1979	
1954	Edgar King	Surgeon and pathologist	1900	1966	
1954	Essington Lewis	Industrialist	1881	1961	
1954	Ian Murray Mackerras	Zoologist	1898	1980	
1954	John Madsen	Physicist and engineer	1879	1969	
1954	Patrick Desmond Fitzgerald Murray	Zoologist	1900	1967	
1954	Edwin James George Pitman	Statistics and probability theory	1897	1993	
1954	Charles Priestley	Meteorologist	1915	1988	
1954	Harold Raggatt	Geologist	1900	1968	
1954	Albert Lloyd George Rees	Chemical physics	1916	1989	
1954	Rutherford Ness Robertson	Botanist and biologist	1913	2001	
1954	William Sydney Robinson	Businessman, industrialist and diplomat	1876	1963	
1954	Jack William Roderick	Civil engineer	1913	1990	
1954	William Percy Rogers	Zoologist, parasitologist	1914	1997	
1954	Frank Leslie Stillwell	Geologist	1888	1963	
1954	Thomas Griffith Taylor	Geographer, anthropologist and explorer	1880	1963	
1954	Ernest Titterton	Nuclear physicist and professor	1916	1990	
1954	Victor Martin Trikojus	Professor of biochemistry	1902	1985	
1954	Arthur William Turner	Veterinary scientist and bacteriologist	1900	1989	
1954	Eric Underwood	Agricultural scientist	1905	1980	
1954	Horace Waring	Zoologist (UWA)	1910	1980	
1954	Ian Wark	Chemist	1899	1985	
1954	Doug Waterhouse	Entomologist	1916	2000	
1954	Walter Waterhouse	Agricultural scientist	1887	1969	
1954	Joseph Garnett Wood	Botanist	1900	1959	
1955	Victor Albert Bailey	Ionospheric physics and population dynamics	1895	1964	
1955	Edward Holbrook Derrick	Pathologist	1898	1976	
1955	Alexander Killen Macbeth	Organic chemist	1889	1957	
1955	Michael JD White	Zoologist and cytologist	1910	1983	
1956	Max Day	Entomologist	1915	2017	Oldest Fellow
1956	Clifford Walter Emmens	Veterinary physiologist	1913	1999	
1956	Dorothy Hill	Geologist (UQ)	1907	1997	
1956	Richard Meyer	Mathematician	1919	2008	
1956	John Stewart Turner	Botanist and plant physiologist	1908	1991	
1957	Roland Andrews	Industrial chemist	1897	1961	
1957	Edward George Bowen	Physicist, radar, radio astronomer	1911	1991	
1957	Martin Glaessner	Geologist and palaeontologist	1906	1989	
1957	Robert Morton	Biochemist	1920	1963	
1957	Robin Stokes	Chemist	1918	2016	
1958	Adrien Albert	Medicinal chemistry	1907	1989	
1958	Horace Newton Barber	Botanist and geneticist	1914	1971	
1958	Robert Menzies	Australia's longest-serving prime minister	1894	1978	
1958	Charles William Shoppee	Organic chemistry	1904	1994	
1958	Alan Walsh	Physicist	1916	1998	
1958	William Henry Wittrick	Engineer	1922	1986	
1959	Wilbur Norman Christiansen	Radio astronomer	1913	2007	
1959	Kenneth Hedley Lewis Key	Entomologist	1911	2002	
1959	Bernard Mills	Radio astronomer	1920	2011	
1959	James Robert Price	Chemist	1912	1999	
1959	Keith Leonard Sutherland	Industrial chemist	1916	1980	
1959	Robert John Walsh	Geneticist and medical scientist	1917	1983	
1960	Albert Ernest Alexander	Colloid chemist	1914	1970	
1960	Geoffrey Badger	Organic chemist, academic, and author	1916	2002	
1960	Kenneth Le Couteur	Foundation Professor of Theoretical Physics at ANU	1920	2011	
1960	James Meadows Rendel	Geneticist	1915	2001	
1960	Fred White	Chairman of CSIRO from 1959 to 1970	1905	1994	
1961	Herbert Andrewartha	Entomology, biology, zoology and animal ecology	1907	1992	
1961	Jack Ellerton Becker	Entrepreneur and significant donor to the Academy	1904	1979	
1961	Charles Birch	Geneticist specialising in population ecology	1918	2009	
1961	John M. Cowley	Electron microscopy, diffraction and crystallography	1923	2004	
1961	Frank Dwyer	Professor of Chemistry (ANU)	1910	1962	
1961	John Edwin Falk	Pharmaceutical chemist; biochemist; musician	1917	1970	
1961	Henry Oliver Lancaster	Statistician	1913	2001	
1962	Stephen John Angyal	Organic chemist	1914	2012	
1962	Ronald G. Giovanelli	Physicist	1915	1984	
1962	Pat Moran	Statistician	1917	1988	
1962	Alexander George Ogston	Biochemist	1911	1996	
1962	Armin Öpik	Paleontologist	1898	1983	
1962	Spencer Smith-White	Botanist	1909	1998	
1963	Archie McIntyre	Neurophysiologist	1913	2002	
1963	Jack Piddington	Radiophysicist	1920	1997	
1963	Ernest Ritchie	Organic chemist	1917	1976	
1963	George Szekeres	Mathematician	1911	2005	
1963	David Evan Thomas	Geologist	1902	1978	
1964	Gordon Ada	Biochemist (microbiology, virology, immunology)	1922	2012	
1964	Alexander Thomas Dick	Chemical pathologist	1911	1982	
1964	Jim Morrison	Physical chemist	1924	2013	
1964	Bernhard Neumann	Mathematician	1909	2002	
1964	John Sprent	Parasitologist	1915	2010	
1964	Paul Wild	Radio astronomer	1923	2008	
1965	Ronald Drayton Brown	Chemist	1927	2008	
1965	David Roderick Curtis	Professor of Pharmacology (ANU)	1927	2017	
1965	William Herdman Elliott	Biochemist	1925	2012	
1965	Graeme Reade Anthony Ellis	Physicist (low-frequency radio observations)	1921	2011	
1965	Kurt Mahler	Mathematician	1903	1998	
1966	Stephen Boyden	Ecologist, veterinarian and biohistorian	1925		
1966	Richard Casey	16th Governor-General of Australia	1890	1976	
1966	Ben Gascoigne	Astronomer	1915	2010	
1966	Sefton Davidson Hamann	Applied chemist	1921	2009	
1966	Ted Ringwood	Geophysicist and geochemist	1930	1993	
1966	Robert Ford Whelan	Professor of Human Physiology and Pharmacology (Adelaide); Vice-Chancellor (UniWA)	1922	1984	
1967	John Adair Barker	Theoretical physicist	1925	1995	
1967	Peter Orlebar Bishop	Visual neurophysiologist	1917	2012	
1967	Robert Hanbury Brown	Astronomer, physicist, radar and radio astronomy	1916	2002	
1967	Alexander Mcleod Mathieson	Chemist and crystallographer	1920	2011	
1967	Gustav Nossal	Biologist	1931		
1967	John Robert Philip	Soil physicist	1927	1999	
1967	Ralph Slatyer	Ecologist	1929	2012	
1968	Hans Buchdahl	Physicist	1919	2010	
1968	Colin Malcolm Donald	Agricultural scientist and agronomist	1910	1985	
1968	Pehr Victor Edman	Biochemist	1916	1977	
1968	John Melvin Swan	Chemist	1924	2015	
1968	Charles Norman Watson-Munro	Professor of Plasma Physics (Sydney)	1915	1991	
1969	Stuart Thomas Butler	Nuclear physicist	1926	1982	
1969	George William Kenneth Cavill	Professor of Organic Chemistry (UNSW)	1922	2017	
1969	Nugget Coombs	Economist and public servant	1906	1997	
1969	David P. Craig	Physical and theoretical chemist	1919	2015	
1969	Bert Main	Zoologist	1919	2009	
1969	Maurice Mawby	Mineralogist and business executive	1904	1977	
1969	Donald Metcalf	Medical research (virology, hematology)	1929	2014	
1969	Bede Morris	Immunologist and pathologist	1927	1988	
1969	Hanna Neumann	Mathematician	1914	1971	
1969	John Gatenby Bolton	resigned 1980	1922	1993	
1970	Edward James Hannan	Statistician	1921	1994	
1970	Mollie Holman	Professor of Physiology, Monash	1930	2010	
1970	Denis Jordan	Professor of Chemistry (Adelaide)	1914	1982	
1970	Jacques Miller	Immunologist	1931		
1970	William Christopher Swinbank	Meteorologist and Physicist	1913	1973	
1970	Guy Kendall White	Physicist	1925	2018	
1971	Geoffrey Burnstock	Pharmacologist, toxicologist	1929	2020	
1971	William Compston	Geophysicist	1931	2025	
1971	Lloyd Evans	Plant physiologist	1927	2015	
1971	Frank William Ernest Gibson	Professor of Biochemistry (ANU)	1923	2008	
1971	Alan Head	Physicist	1925	2010	
1971	Adrian Horridge	Professor of Neurobiology (ANU)	1927	2024	
1971	Lawrence Ernest Lyons	Professor of Physical Chemistry (UQ)	1922	2010	
1971	Raymond Martin	Professor of Chemistry (Melbourne)	1926	2020	
1971	Gordon Elliott Wall	Mathematician	1925	2023	
1971	Donald Eric Weiss	Industrial chemist	1926	2008	
1972	John Robert Anderson	Chemist	1928	2007	
1972	Norman Boardman	Biochemist and Science administrator	1926		
1972	Andrew Crowther Hurley	Quantum chemist and Mathematician	1926	1988	
1972	Charles Angas Hurst	Mathematical physics	1923	2011	
1972	Max Kelly	Mathematician	1930	2007	
1972	Anthony William Linnane	Biochemist	1930	2017	
1972	Walter Victor Macfarlane	Physiologist	1913	1982	
1972	Mervyn Silas Paterson	Geophysicist	1925	2020	
1972	Arthur Melville Thompson	Physicist	1917	2009	
1973	Athelstan Beckwith	Professor of Chemistry (Adelaide and ANU)	1930	2010	
1973	William Russell Levick	Professorial Fellow in Physiology (ANU)	1931	2022	
1973	James Henry Michael	Mathematician	1920	2001	
1973	Alexander Forbes Moodie	Chemical Physics	1923	2018	
1973	James Patrick Quirk	Agricultural scientist	1924	2022	
1973	Ian Gordon Ross	Chemist	1926	2006	
1973	Robert Street	Physicist	1920	2013	
1973	Ronald Harry Wharton	Entomologist and parasitologist	1923	1983	
1973	Howard Knox Worner	Metallurgist	1913	2006	
1974	Brian Anderson	Professor of Information Sciences and Engineering (ANU)	1941		
1974	Andrew Reginald Howard Cole	Chemist	1924	2024	
1974	David Headley Green	Geologist	1936	2024	
1974	Paul Ivan Korner	Medical scientist and Physiologist	1925	2012	
1974	John Joseph Mahony	Mathematician and Aeronautical engineer	1929	1992	
1974	Richard Freeman Mark	Medical scientist	1934	2003	
1974	Jim Pittard	Professor of Microbiology (Melbourne)	1932		
1974	Robert Porter	Medical scientist and Physiologist	1932		
1974	Brian John Robinson	Radio astronomer	1930	2004	
1975	Harold Frith	Ornithologist	1921	1982	
1975	Marshall Hatch	Biochemist and plant physiologist	1932		
1975	Bruce Godfrey Hyde	Inorganic chemist	1925	2014	
1975	John Oswald Newton	Physicist	1924	2016	
1975	Ren Potts	Professor of Applied Mathematics (Adelaide)	1925	2005	
1975	David Henry Solomon	Polymer chemist	1929		
1975	Richard Limon Stanton	Geologist	1926	2020	
1975	Henry Robert Wallace	Plant pathologist	1924	2011	
1975	Irvine Armstrong Watson	Agricultural Botany	1914	1986	
1976	Louis Walter Davies	Physicist	1923	2001	
1976	Neville Horner Fletcher	Physicist	1930	2017	
1976	Joseph Mark Gani	Statistician	1924	2016	
1976	Anton Linder Hales	Geophysicist (ANU)	1911	2006	
1976	William Hayes	Geneticist	1913	1994	
1976	Harry Clive Minnett	Radiophysicist	1917	2003	
1976	Jim Peacock	Botany, zoology and genetics	1937	2025	
1976	Alan Sargeson	Inorganic chemist	1930	2008	
1976	Alan B. Wardrop	Botany	1921	2003	
1977	Rodney Baxter	Physicist specialising in statistical mechanics	1940	2025	
1977	James Alexander Forrest	Lawyer, businessman and philanthropist	1905	1990	
1977	Peter William Gage	Medical researcher	1937	2005	
1977	Chris Heyde	Probability, stochastic processes and statistics	1939	2008	
1977	Noel Hush	Biochemist	1924	2019	
1977	Douglas Geoffrey Lampard	Electrical engineer	1927	1994	
1977	Keith Norrish	Mineralogist	1924	2017	
1977	George Ernest Rogers	Biochemist	1927	2021	
1977	Hugh Bryan Spencer Womersley	Phycologist	1922	2011	
1978	Leo Michael Clarebrough	Metallurgist	1924	2015	
1978	Robert Donald Bruce Fraser	Biochemist and Biophysicist	1924	2019	
1978	Berthold Halpern	Chemist	1923	1980	
1978	Allen Kerr	Professor of Plant Pathology (Adelaide)	1926	2023	
1978	Phillip Law	Scientist and Antarctic explorer	1912	2010	
1978	Barry William Ninham	Physicist	1936		
1978	Charles Barry Osmond	Plant biologist	1939		
1978	Ian Potter	Businessman and philanthropist	1902	1994	
1978	Stuart Ross Taylor	Cosmochemistry, planetary science, geochemistry	1925	2021	
1978	Neil Trudinger	Mathematician	1942		
1978	William Thomas Williams	Botanist	1913	1995	
1979	Robert Vincent Blanden	Immunologist	1938		
1979	William Roderick Blevin	Physicist	1929	2022	
1979	Robert Woodhouse Crompton	Physicist	1926	2022	
1979	Derek Denton	Research exploring the nature of consciousness in animals	1924	2022	
1979	Brian Gunning	Biologist	1934		
1979	Bruce William Holloway	Geneticist	1928		
1979	Alan James Parker	Chemist	1933	1982	
1979	Roger Ian Tanner	Mechanical engineer	1933		
1979	Stewart Turner	Geophysicist	1930	2022	
1980	Martin Arthur Bennett	Chemist	1935		
1980	Alec Baillie Costin	Ecologist	1925	2022	
1980	Edward Hughesdon Davis	Civil engineer and Geotechnical Engineer	1920	1981	
1980	James W. Lance	Neurologist	1926	2019	
1980	Ian McLennan	Businessman	1909	1998	
1980	Garth Paltridge	Atmospheric physicist	1940		
1980	John Stewart Pate	Plant physiologist	1932	2023	
1980	Derek William Robinson	theoretical mathematician and physicist	1935	2021	
1980	John Veysey Sanders	Physicist and Crystallographer	1924	1987	
1980	Geoffrey Bruce Sharman	Zoologist	1925	2015	
1981	Gavin Brown	Mathematician	1942	2010	
1981	Warren Ewens	Mathematician, population geneticist	1937		
1981	Ken Freeman	Astronomer and astrophysicist	1940		
1981	Michael William McElhinny	Geophysicist	1933		
1981	James Graham McLeod	Neurologist	1932	2022	
1981	Lawrence Walter Nichol	Biochemist	1935	2015	
1981	Michael Pitman	Biologist	1933	2000	
1981	Rodney Warren Rickards	Organic chemist	1934	2007	
1982	Max Bennett	neuroscientist	1939		
1982	Alexander Boden	philanthropist, industrialist	1913	1993	
1982	Richard Brent	Mathematician and computer scientist	1946		
1982	Jacob Israelachvili	Chemical engineer	1944	2018	
1982	John Francis Lovering	Geologist	1930	2023	
1982	Ian Ellery McCarthy	Mathematical physicist	1930	2005	
1982	Angus David McEwan	Oceanographer	1937	2018	
1982	Alan Forrest Reid	Chemist	1931	2013	
1982	Wilfred John Simmonds	Physiologist and Pathologist	1918	1990	
1982	Norman Alan Walker	Plant physiologist	1929	2013	
1982	Wesley Kingston Whitten	Professor of reproductive biology (ANU)	1918	2010	
1983	Kenton Stewart Campbell	Palaeontology (ANU)	1927	2017	
1983	Keith David Cole	Physicist	1929	2010	
1983	Peter Doherty	immunologist	1940		
1983	David Stuart Letham	Chemist and Biochemist	1926		
1983	Lew Mander	Organic chemist	1939	2020	
1983	Michael Robert Osborne	Mathematician	1934		
1983	Stephen John Redman	Electrical engineer and Physiologist	1938		
1983	Leon Simon	Mathematician	1945		
1983	Robert Henry Symons	Biochemist	1934	2006	
1984	Cyril Angus Appleby	Plant biochemist	1928		
1984	Ian Roy Cowan	Environmental Biology	1931	2017	
1984	Hans Freeman	Bioinorganic chemist	1929	2008	
1984	Thomas William Healy	Physical chemist	1937		
1984	Kurt Lambeck	Professor of geophysics (ANU)	1941		
1984	William Moran	Mathematician	1944		
1984	Donald Charles Morton	Astronomer and Astrophysicist	1933		
1984	Roger Valentine Short	Reproductive biologist	1930	2021	
1984	Jonathan Stone	Physiology	1942		
1985	Fraser Bergersen	Botany	1929	2011	
1985	Brian Norman Figgis	Chemist	1930		
1985	Douglas Ian McCloskey	Medical	1941		
1985	Anthony Edward Perry	Mechanical engineer	1937	2001	
1985	Eugene Seneta	Mathematics and statistics (Sydney)	1941		
1985	Allan Snyder	Physics	1942		
1985	Elizabeth Truswell	Geologist	1941		
1985	Robert Gerard Wake	Biochemist	1933	2020	
1985	David Zeidler	Chemist and industrialist	1918	1998	
1986	Jerry Adams	Genetics	1940		
1986	John Henry Carver	Physicist	1926	2004	
1986	Suzanne Cory	Biologist	1942		
1986	Robert John Hunter	Physical chemist	1933		
1986	Lawrie Johnson	Taxonomic botanist	1925	1997	
1986	Alan Gaius Ramsay McIntosh	Mathematician	1942	2016	
1986	Donald Blair Melrose	Astrophysicist	1940		
1986	Cecil Hugh Tyndale-Biscoe	Zoologist	1929		
1986	Erich Weigold	Nuclear physicist	1937		
1986	John Atherton Young	Physiology	1936	2004	
1987	Jan Anderson	Organic chemist and plant biologist	1932	2015	
1987	Colin Russell Austin	Embryologist	1914	2004	
1987	John Philip Chalmers	Medical research	1937		
1987	Peter Hall	Mathematics	1951	2016	
1987	Bernard Katz	Physiologist	1911	2003	
1987	Kenneth G. McCracken	Geophysicist, mineral physicist and physicist	1933		
1987	Bruce Harold John McKellar	Physicist	1941		
1987	Donald Harold Napper	Physical chemist	1937		
1987	Jack Pettigrew	Neuroscientist	1943	2019	
1987	Bruce Runnegar	Palaeontologist (UCLA)	1941		
1988	Brian Manning Johnstone	Physiologist	1924	2019	
1988	Harry Poulos	Civil engineer and Geotechnical Engineer	1940		
1988	Maxwell Howard Brennan	Physicis	1932		
1988	Graham Farquhar	Biophysicist	1947		
1988	Ian McDougall	Geochemist	1935	2018	
1988	Graham Frank Mitchell	Immunologist	1941		
1988	Leo Radom	Chemist	1944		
1988	Edwin Ernest Salpeter	Astrophysicist	1924	2008	
1988	Ernie Tuck	Applied mathematician (Adelaide)	1939	2009	
1988	Roy Woodall	Geologist	1930	2021	
1989	John Barton Furness	Neurobiologist	1945		
1989	Ross Street	Mathematician	1945		
1989	Michael Ian Bruce	Chemist	1938		
1989	Samuel Warren Carey	Geologist	1911	2002	
1989	Peter Colman	Biologist	1944		
1989	Marcello Costa	Medical researcher	1940	2024	
1989	Robert Bruce Knox	Botanist	1938	1997	
1989	Richard Norman Manchester	Physicist	1942		
1989	Graeme Pearman	Environmental scientist	1941		
1989	Raymond John Stalker	Aeronautical engineer	1930	2014	
1990	Alan Maxwell Bond	Inorganic chemist	1946		
1990	Graeme Barry Cox	Biochemist	1939	2025	
1990	Ross Henry Day	Psychologist	1927	2018	
1990	Martin Green	Electrical engineer	1948		
1990	Roger Hamilton James Grimshaw	Mathematician	1938		
1990	Dan Haneman	Physicist	1931	2002	
1990	Roger Wolcott Richardson	Mathematician	1930	1993	
1990	Frank Andrew Smith	Botanist	1940		
1990	Tony Thomas	Physicist	1949		
1991	Adrienne Clarke	Botanist	1938		
1991	Peter Hannaford	Physicist	1939		
1991	Bruce Edward Hobbs	Geophysicist	1936		
1991	Shirley Jeffrey	Biochemist	1930	2014	
1991	Ian Reay Mackay	Immunologist	1922	2020	
1991	Stjepan Marcelja	Applied mathematician	1941		
1991	Geoffrey Donald Thorburn	Physiologist	1930	1996	
1991	John White	Chemist	1937	2023	
1992	Michael Barber	Mathematics and physics	1947		
1992	Antony Basten	Medical researcher	1939		
1992	Graeme James Caughley	Biologist	1937	1994	
1992	John Michael Arthur Chappell	Geoscientist	1940	2018	
1992	Robert Leith Dewar	Physicist	1944		
1992	Robert Henry Frater	Engineer	1937		
1992	Ken Myer	Patron of the arts, humanities and sciences	1921	1992	
1992	Jeremy David Pickett-Heaps	Botanist	1940	2021	
1992	Sever Sternhell	Organic chemist	1930	2022	
1992	Ann Woolcock	Physicist	1937	2001	
1993	David Boger	Chemical engineer	1939	2025	
1993	William Francis Budd	Meteorologist and Glaciologist	1938	2022	
1993	Antony Wilks Burgess	Biochemist	1946		
1993	Michael Cowling	Mathematician	1949		
1993	Ronald Ekers	Radio astronomer	1941		
1993	Daniel Carleton Gajdusek	Physicist	1923	2008	
1993	Adrian John Gibbs	Virologist	1934		
1993	George David Scarcliffe Hirst	Pharmacologist	1944		
1993	Jörg Imberger	Civil engineer	1942		
1993	Leonard Francis Lindoy	Chemist	1937		
1993	Robert Alexander McIntosh	Agricultural scientist	1939		
1993	Ian Sloan	Applied mathematician	1938		
1993	Maxwell John Whitten	Geneticist	1940		
1993	Robyn Williams	Science broadcaster	1944		
1994	Christopher Ash	Mathematician	1945	1995	
1994	Henry George Burger	Endocrinologist	1933	2024	
1994	Denis Evans	Physicist	1951		
1994	Bob Gilbert	Chemist (UQ)	1946		
1994	Brian Kennett	Physicist and seismologist	1948		
1994	Anthony George Klein	Physicist	1935	2021	
1994	John Moore	Engineer	1941	2013	
1994	Geoffrey Opat	Physicist	1935	2002	
1994	John Passioura	Agricultural scientist	1938		
1994	John Shine	Biochemist	1946		
1994	Antony Underwood	Ecologist	1947		
1994	Joseph Tony Wiskich	Botanist and plant biochemist	1935		
1995	John Robert Booker	Engineer	1942	1998	
1995	David James Burke	Neurologist	1944		
1995	Liz Dennis	Plant biology	1943		
1995	Ashley Roger Dunn	Molecular biologist	1945		
1995	Francis Patrick Larkins	Chemist	1942		
1995	Edward Maslen	Chemical physicist and crystallographer	1935	1997	
1995	Arthur James McComb	Botanist	1936	2017	
1995	David Pegg	Physicist	1941		
1995	Mandyam Veerambudi Srinivasan	Bioengineer, neuroscience (UQ)	1948		
1995	Colin John Thompson	Mathematician	1941		
1995	Ian Walter Boothroyd Thornton	Zoologist	1926	2002	
1995	John Veevers	Geologist	1930	2018	
1996	Jeremy James Burdon	Biologist			
1996	James Alexander Angus	Pharmacologist	1949		
1996	Edward Norman Dancer	Mathematician	1946		
1996	Pierre-Gilles de Gennes	Physicist	1932	2007	
1996	David de Kretser	Medical researcher	1939		
1996	Mike Dopita	Astronomer	1946	2018	
1996	Leslie David Field	Chemist	1953		
1996	Graeme Jameson	Engineer	1936		
1996	Barry Jones	Polymath	1932		
1996	David Kemp	Plant geneticist and parasitologist	1945	2013	
1996	Oliver Mayo	Biologist and Statistician	1942		
1996	Phillip Lyle McFadden	Geophysicist	1950		
1996	Nicos Anthony Nicola	Biochemist (UQ)	1950		
1996	Cheryl Praeger	Mathematician.	1948		
1997	Robin Anthony Bedding	Entomologist	1940		
1997	Ian Gordon Dance	Chemist	1940		
1997	George Dennis Dracoulis	Nuclear physicist	1944	2014	
1997	Graham Clifford Goodwin	Electrical Engineering	1945		
1997	Adrienne Ruth Hardham	Botany			
1997	Philip William Kuchel	Biochemist	1946		
1997	Trevor John McDougall	Physical oceanographer	1952		
1997	Brendan McKay	Computer scientist	1951		
1997	Elspeth McLachlan	Neuroscientist	1942		
1997	Rupert Myers	Metallurgist	1921	2019	
1997	Marilyn Bernice Renfree	Zoologist	1947		
1997	Colin Sullivan	Physician	1945		
1997	Grant Robert Sutherland	Geneticist	1945		
1998	Thomas John Andrews	Plant biochemist	1941		
1998	Bruce William Chappell	Geologist and Geochemist	1956	2012	
1998	Graeme Clark	Doctor	1935		
1998	Robert Delbourgo	Physicist	1940		
1998	David Michael Doddrell	Chemist (UQ)	1944		
1998	Simon Charles Gandevia	Medical researcher	1953		
1998	John Kerr	Pathologist (UQ)	1934	2024	
1998	Gustav Isaac Lehrer	Mathematician	1947		
1998	Thomas John Martin	Physician	1937		
1998	Jeremy Mould	Astronomer	1949		
1998	Roger Everett Summons	Geobiology	1946		
1998	Rodney Stuart Tucker	Electrical engineer	1948		
1998	James Francis Williams	Atomic physicist			
1999	Jenny Graves	Geneticist	1941		
1999	Colin Rogers	Applied mathematician	1940		
1999	Andrew John Ward Gleadow	Geologist	1948		
1999	Barry Marshall	Physician	1951		
1999	Colin L. Masters	Neuropathologist	1947		
1999	John Alexander McKenzie	Genetics	1947		
1999	Gerard James Milburn	Quantum physicist (UQ)	1958		
1999	Michael Paddon-Row	Organic chemist	1942		
1999	Nhan Phan-Thien	Mechanical engineering	1952		
1999	Kenneth Douglas Shortman	Biochemist	1937		
1999	Dimitrie George Stephenson	Physiologist	1945		
1999	Robert Oliver Watts	Chemist			
2000	Bruce Konrad Armstrong	Medical researcher	1944		
2000	Adrian Baddeley	Statistics	1955		
2000	Robin Batterham		1941		
2000	Julie Hazel Campbell	Vascular biologist (UQ)	1946		
2000	Victor Vilevich Flambaum	Physicist	1951		
2000	Bruce Ernest Kemp	Biochemist	1946		
2000	Keith Nugent	Physicist	1959		
2000	Mark Felton Randolph	Civil engineer	1951		
2000	Peter Richard Reeves	Microbiologist	1934		
2000	Richard Robson	Chemist	1937		
2000	Lesley Joy Rogers	Neurobiologist	1943		
2000	Joseph Sambrook	Biologist	1939	2019	
2000	Curt Wentrup	Chemist (UQ)	1942		
2001	Allan James Canty	Chemistry			
2001	Bob Clark	Physics			
2001	Andrew Cockburn	Ornithology	1954		
2001	Max Coltheart	Cognitive science	1939		
2001	Alan Cowman	Microbiology	1954		
2001	Maxwell John Crossley	Chemistry			
2001	Ross William Griffiths	Geophysics			
2001	Patrick George Holt				
2001	Terry Hughes	Ecology	1956		Laureate Fellow
2001	Yiu-Wing Mai	Materials engineering	1946		
2001	Ian Mackay Ritchie	Metallurgy	1936	2014	
2001	Paul Gerard McCormick				
2001	Vicki Rubian Sara	Endocrinology	1946		
2001	Sarah Elizabeth Smith	Mycology	1941	2019	
2001	Terry Speed	Statistics	1943		
2001	Robert Williamson	Molecular biology	1938		
2002	Mike Archer	Paleontology	1945		
2002	Murray Esler	Cardiology	1944		
2002	Robin John Evans	Electrical engineering	1947		
2002	Chris Goodnow	Immunology	1959		
2002	Robert Michael Graham	Cardiology	1948		
2002	Anthony John Guttmann	Mathematics	1945		
2002	John Edward Hutchinson	Mathematics	1946		
2002	John Viggo Jacobsen	Plant science			
2002	Yuri Kivshar	Physics	1959		
2002	Pauline Ladiges	Botany	1948		
2002	Eugenie Ruth Lumbers	Cardiovascular physiology			
2002	Suzanne O'Reilly	Geology	1946		
2002	Ezio Rizzardo	Chemistry	1943		
2002	Tamarapu Sridhar	Chemical engineering			
2002	Fiona Stanley	Epidemiology	1946		
2002	Robert Lyndsay Sutherland	Medical research	1947	2012	
2003	Maria Orlowska	Computer science	1951		
2003	Perry Francis Bartlett	Neuroscience			
2003	Robert William Bilger	Engineering	1936	2015	
2003	Rossiter Henry Crozier	Genetics	1943	2009	
2003	Peter David Drummond	Physics	1950		
2003	David Ian Groves	Economy geography	1942		
2003	Michael John Hynes	Molecular biology			
2003	Frederick Arthur Oscar Mendelsohn	Neuroscience			
2003	J. Hyam Rubinstein	Mathematics	1948		
2003	Richard Shine	Evolutionary biology	1950		
2003	Andreas Strasser	Medical science			
2003	Stephen Donald Tyerman	Plant biology			
2003	David Laurence Vaux	Molecular biology	1959		
2003	Mark von Itzstein	Carbohydrate science	1958		
2003	Stanley Bruce Wild	Inorganic chemistry			
2003	James Stanislaus Williams	Physics	1948		
2004	Thomas Joseph Higgins	Botany			
2004	Robert Anthony Antonia				
2004	Martin Banwell		1954		
2004	Robert Bartnik		1956	2022	
2004	Robert Charles Baxter				
2004	Matthew Malcolm Colless				
2004	David Ian Cook				
2004	Christopher John Easton				
2004	Peter John Forrester				
2004	Ian Frazer	Immunologist (UQ)	1953		
2004	Paul Raymond Haddad				
2004	Doug Hilton		1964		
2004	Richard Hobbs				
2004	Ary Anthony Hoffmann	Entomologist and geneticist			
2004	Ramamohanarao Kotagiri				
2004	Malcolm Thomas McCulloch				
2004	Nancy Millis		1922	2012	
2004	John Theodore Ralph				
2004	David Robert Smyth				
2004	Robert Alan Vincent				
2004	Malcolm Ross Walter				
2004	Marelyn Wintour-Coghlan				
2005	Samuel Berkovic	Medicine (Melbourne)	1953		
2005	Michael George Eastwood	Mathematics (Adelaide)			
2005	Jeff Ellis	CSIRO plant industry, Canberra	1953		
2005	Jorgen Frederiksen	CSIRO atmospheric research, Victoria			
2005	Franz Grieser	Chemistry (Melbourne)			
2005	Ruth Hall	Molecular and microbial biosciences (Sydney)	1945		
2005	Mark Harrison	Earth sciences (ANU)			
2005	Richard Hartley	Information science and engineering (ANU)			
2005	Robin Holliday	Genetics	1932	2014	
2005	Stephen Hyde	Applied mathematics (ANU)			
2005	Chennupati Jagadish	Electronic materials engineering (ANU)	1957		
2005	Trevor Lamb	Neuroscience (ANU)			
2005	Geoffrey McFadden	Botany (Melbourne)			
2005	Amnon Neeman	Mathematics (ANU)			
2005	Hugh Possingham	The Ecology Centre (UQ)	1962		
2005	John Ralston	Chemistry and minerals (UniSA)	1946		
2006	David Grant Allen	Physiology (Sydney)			
2006	Brian John Boyle	Cosmologist (CSIRO ATNF)			
2006	Mark Burgman	Botany (Melbourne)	1956		
2006	David Celermajer	Cardiology (RPAH/Sydney)	1961		
2006	Barry Egan	Biomedical science (Adelaide)			
2006	Lorenzo Faraone	Electrical engineering (UWA)			
2006	David John Hinde	Nuclear physics (ANU)			
2006	Andrew Holmes	Organic chemist	1943		
2006	Brian Herbert Kay	Entomologist			
2006	Roger Powell	Geologist	1949		
2006	Stephen Rich Rintoul	Oceanography and climate science (CSIRO)			
2006	Igor Shparlinski	Number theory			
2006	Michelle Simmons	Nanotechnology, quantum electronic devices	1967		
2006	Evan Rutherford Simpson	Steroid hormone physiology			
2006	Jonathan Sprent	Cellular immunology			
2006	Susanne von Caemmerer	Plant physiology and biochemistry			
2006	Robin Warren	Clinical pathology (Helicobacter pylori – Nobel laureate)	1937		
2006	John Zillman	Meteorology and science policy	1939		
2007	David Albert Cooper	HIV/AIDS	1949	2018	
2007	Ian William Dawes	Genetics			
2007	John Joseph Finnigan	Complex systems science			
2007	Min Gu	Optoelectronics	1960		
2007	Richard Harvey	Cardiac research (Victor Chang)	1953		
2007	David John Hill	Information engineering (ANU)			
2007	John Joseph Hopwood	Lysosomal diseases research			
2007	Ian Douglas Hume	Biological sciences			
2007	David James	Cell biologist	1958		
2007	Peter Andrew Lay	Inorganic chemistry (Sydney)			
2007	Douglas Robert MacFarlane	Chemistry (Monash)			
2007	Rana Ellen Munns	CSIRO plant industry			
2007	Stephen James Simpson	Biological sciences (Sydney)	1957		
2007	Scott W. Sloan	Civil engineering (Newcastle)	1954	2019	
2007	Gordon Wallace	Intelligent polymer research	1958		
2007	Alan Hepburn Welsh	Mathematics (ANU)			
2008	Antony Bacic	Botanist			
2008	Murray Badger	Biologist			
2008	Rod Boswell	Plasma physics	1932		
2008	William Heath	Immunologist			
2008	Nalini Joshi	Mathematics			
2008	Peter Koopman	Biology, molecular genetics (UQ)	1959		
2008	David Lindenmayer	Ecologist			
2008	Nick Martin	Behavior genetics (UQ)	1950		
2008	John Mattick	Molecular biology (UQ)	1950		
2008	Bridget Ogilvie	Parasitology	1938		
2008	Hugh O'Neill	Mineral thermodynamics			
2008	Brian Schmidt	Cosmology	1967		
2008	Patrick Tam	Mammalian embryonic development			
2008	Geoffrey Tregear	Peptide synthesis			
2008	Matthew Wand	Mathematics and statistics			
2008	Sven Warnaar	Mathematics and statistics			
2008	Howard Wiseman	Quantum measurement (UQ)	1968		
2009	Marilyn Ball				
2009	John Carter				
2009	Frank Caruso		1968		
2009	Kong-Hong Andy Choo				
2009	Warrick Couch		1954		
2009	Hugh Durrant-Whyte		1961		
2009	Charles Mackay				
2009	Paul Mulvaney				
2009	Robert Parton	Biochemist (UQ)			
2009	George Paxinos	Neuroscientist	1944		
2009	Michael Raupach	Climate scientist	1950	2015	
2009	Leigh Simmons				
2009	Xu-Jia Wang	Mathematician	1963		
2009	Peter Waterhouse				
2009	Mark Westoby	Evolutionary ecology	1947		
2009	Raymond Withers				
2010	Vladimir Bazhanov	Physics			
2010	Jonathan Borwein	Mathematics	1951	2016	
2010	Francis Carbone	Immunology			
2010	Allan Chivas	Geology			
2010	Marianne Frommer				
2010	Trevor Lithgow	Genetics			
2010	John G. Oakeshott	Biology			
2010	Scott O'Neill	Biology (UQ)			
2010	John O'Sullivan	Digital signal processing			
2010	Michael Parker				
2010	Steven Prawer				
2010	Robert Pressey				
2010	Roger Reddel				
2010	Jeffrey Reimers	Chemistry			
2010	Elaine Sadler	Astrophysics			
2010	Peter Visscher	Genetics (UQ)			
2010	Raymond Volkas	Physics			
2011	John Aitken	Reproductive scientist			
2011	Marilyn Anderson	Biochemist			
2011	David Black	Chemist			
2011	Mark Blows	Geneticist (UQ)			
2011	Mahananda Dasgupta	Physicist			
2011	Michael Goddard	Geneticist			
2011	Trevor Hambley	Bioinorganic chemist			
2011	Staffan Kjelleberg	Microbial ecologist			
2011	Thomas Maschmeyer	Catalysis	1966		
2011	Ross Campbell McPhedran	Wave scientist			
2011	Joseph J. Monaghan	Astrophysicist			
2011	Ian R. Petersen	Control theory			
2011	Mathai Varghese	Geometric analyst			
2011	Colin Ward	Chemist			
2011	Emma Whitelaw	Epigeneticist			
2011	George Williams	Earth and planetary scientist			
2011	Aibing Yu	Particle scientist			
2012	Michael Alpers	Centre for International Health, Curtin University			
2012	Joss Bland-Hawthorn	Astrophysicist	1959		
2012	Paul Burn	Chemist (UQ)			
2012	John Church		1951		
2012	Patrick De Deckker				
2012	Peter Dodds				
2012	John Endler		1947		
2012	Tim Flannery		1956		
2012	Johannes Lambers		1950		
2012	Stephen MacMahon				
2012	James McCluskey				
2012	Graeme Moad	Polymer chemist	1952		
2012	Tanya Monro	Photonics	1973		
2012	John Norris	Astronomer			
2012	Stephen Powles	Agriculture			
2012	Louise Ryan	Statistician			
2012	Frances Separovic	Biophysical chemist			
2012	Greg Stuart				
2012	Michael Tobar				
2012	Jane Visvader				
2012	Robert Williamson				
2013	Benjamin Andrews	Mathematician			
2013	Matthew Brown	Genetics (UQ)			
2013	David Craik	Biological chemist (UQ)			
2013	David Day	Plant mitochondrial respiration			
2013	Yuri Estrin	Materials science			
2013	John Evans				
2013	Bryan Gaensler		1973		
2013	Andrew Hassell	Mathematical analyst			
2013	Ove Hoegh-Guldberg	Biologist (UQ)	1959		
2013	Ian Jackson				
2013	Sharad Kumar				
2013	Max Lu	Chemical engineer and nanotechnology (UQ)	1963		
2013	Boris Martinac				
2013	James Paton	Pathogenesis and prevention of bacterial infectious diseases			
2013	Richard Richards				
2013	Michael Sandiford	Geologist			
2013	Geoffrey Taylor	Physicist			
2013	Brian Walker	Ecologist			
2013	Andrew White	Quantum physics (UQ)			
2013	Bryan Williams				
2014	Rose Amal	Photocatalysis	1983		
2014	Hans Bachor	Quantum and classical optics	1952		
2014	John Bowman	Plant genetics			
2014	Alan Carey	Pure mathematics			
2014	Georgia Chenevix-Trench	Genetics	1959		
2014	Michelle Coote	Computer-aided chemical design			
2014	Matthew England	Ocean modeller			
2014	Jean Finnegan	Botanist			
2014	Peter Gill	Quantum chemistry	1962		
2014	Barbara Howlett				
2014	Lisa Kewley	Cosmic chemical and star-formation history of the universe	1974		
2014	Hanna Kokko	Ecology and evolutionary biology	1971		
2014	Catherine Livingstone		1955		
2014	Angel Lopez				
2014	Ivan Marusic	Fluid mechanics	1965		
2014	John Miners				
2014	Craig Moritz	Evolutional biology			
2014	Margaret Reid				
2014	Jamie Rossjohn				
2014	Ingrid Scheffer	Human molecular genetics	1958		
2014	George Willis	Mathematics			
2015	Martin Asplund	Solar and stellar physics	1970		
2015	Peter Leslie Bartlett	Computer science and statistics			
2015	Christine Anne Beveridge	Hormonal control of plant development (UQ)			
2015	Jenefer Mary Blackwell				
2015	Christine Charles				
2015	Susan Joy Clark				
2015	Maria Forsyth				
2015	Julian David Gale				
2015	Edward C. Holmes		1965		
2015	Wendy Elizabeth Hoy	Kidney disease (UQ)			
2015	William F. Laurance		1957		
2015	Helene Denise Marsh		1945		
2015	Geoffrey McLachlan	Statistical science (UQ)	1946		
2015	Michael John McLaughlin				
2015	Linda Richards	Neurobiology (UQ)			
2015	Malcolm Scott Sambridge				
2015	Ian David Small				
2015	San Hoa Thang		1954		
2015	Carola Vinuesa		1969		
2015	Michael John Waters	Growth hormone (UQ)			
2015	Zygmunt Edward Switkowski		1948		
2016	Ian Allison	Glaciologist			
2016	David Bellwood	Ecologist			
2016	Ben Eggleton	Nanophotonics and optical physics	1970		
2016	Geoff Fincher	Cereal chemistry			
2016	Alan Finkel		1953		
2016	Simon Foote				
2016	Justin Gooding	Biosensor			
2016	John Kirkegaard	Agricultural scientist			
2016	Anna Koltunow	Plant reproduction			
2016	Geoff Lindeman				
2016	Alex McBratney	Soil scientist			
2016	Patrick McGorry		1952		
2016	Neville Nicholls				
2016	Stephen Nutt				
2016	Sarah A. Robertson	Reproductive biologist			
2016	Halina Rubinsztein-Dunlop	Laser physicist (UQ)	1950		
2016	Susan Scott	General relativity and gravitational wave science			
2016	Daniela Stock	Structural biologist			
2016	Fedor Sukochev	Pure mathematician			
2016	Toby Walsh	Artificial intelligence	1964		
2016	Naomi Wray	Statistical geneticist (UQ)			
2017	Igor Bray	Atomic and molecular collision physics			
2017	Ian Chubb	Chief Scientist of Australia	1943		
2017	Tom Davis	Polymer science, synthetic chemistry			
2017	Jane Elith	Ecologist			
2017	David Gardner	Embryologist			
2017	Jozef Gécz	Human molecular geneticist			
2017	Karl Glazebrook	Astronomer	1965		
2017	Anita Hill	Materials and process engineering			
2017	Philip Hugenholtz	Microbiologist (UQ)			
2017	Cameron Jones	Modern main group chemistry			
2017	Evans Lagudah	Plant geneticist			
2017	Melissa Little	Kidney development research	1963		
2017	Jennifer Martin	Protein crystallographer			
2017	Dietmar Müller	Geoscience	1959		
2017	John Patrick	Plant nutrient transport			
2017	Tim Ralph	Quantum information science (UQ)			
2017	Lois Salamonsen	Human fertility/infertility			
2017	Mark Smyth	Tumour immunology			
2017	John Volkman	Lipid biomarkers			
2017	Branka Vucetic	Coding theory			
2017	Nicholas Wormald	Mathematician	1953		
2018	Alan Andersen	Ecologist			
2018	David Blair	Experimental physicist	1946		
2018	David Bowtell	Ovarian cancer and genomics researcher			
2018	Jennie Brand-Miller	Glycaemic index	1952		
2018	Richard Bryant	Early psychological responses to trauma	1960		
2018	Peter Cawood	Geologist			
2018	Noel Cressie	Spatial statistics	1950		
2018	Christopher Dickman	Ecologist			
2018	Gregory Goodall	Biology of RNA and cancer progression			
2018	Kliti Grice	Organic geochemist			
2018	Lloyd Hollenberg	Quantum information scientist			
2018	Anne Kelso	Biomedical researcher	1954		
2018	Bostjan Kobe	Structural biologist			
2018	Kerrie Mengersen	Bayesian statistician	1962		
2018	Colin Raston	Vortex Fluidic Device	1950		
2018	Veena Sahajwalla	Materials scientist and engineer			
2018	Martina Stenzel	Polymer chemistry			
2018	Dacheng Tao	Artificial intelligence	1978		
2018	Joseph Trapani	Immunologist			
2018	Rachel Webster	Astrophysicist specialising in gravitational lensing	1951		
2018	Geordie Williamson	Mathematician specialising in the geometric representation theory	1981		
2019	Warren Alexander	Medical researcher specialising in molecular haematology			
2019	David Balding	Statistical geneticist and co-developer of the Balding–Nichols match probability formulae			
2019	Christopher Barner-Kowollik	Macromolecular chemist	1973		
2019	Lyn Beazley	Neuroscientist, Chief Scientist for Western Australia	1944		
2019	Debra Bernhardt	Nonequilibrium statistical mechanics	1965		
2019	Maria Byrne	Marine biodiversity			
2019	Mark Cassidy	Civil engineer specialising in offshore oil and gas platforms			
2019	Peter Corke	Robotic vision	1959		
2019	Joanne Etheridge	Electron diffraction and microscopy techniques			
2019	John Hamilton	Molecular biology of inflammation			
2019	Paul Hodges	Motor control and pain			
2019	David Karoly	Climate dynamics and climate change science	1955		
2019	Kerry Landman	Applied mathematics			
2019	Maria Makrides	Maternal–infant nutrition			
2019	David McClelland	Audio-band gravitational wave science	1956		
2019	Alexander Molev	Pure mathematics, specialising in 'Yangians'	1961		
2019	Surinder Singh	Genetic modification of canola			
2019	Catherine Stampfl	Theoretical condensed matter physics			
2019	James Whelan	Agricultural bioscience			
2019	Cynthia Whitchurch	DNA research, particularly extracellular DNA (eDNA)			
2019	Ian Wright	Plant ecology			
2019	Alex Zelinsky	Robotics	1960		
2020	Tim Bedding	Astrophysicist	1966		
2020	Annabelle Bennett		1950		
2020	Lee Berger	Biologist	1970		
2020	Linda Blackall	Microbiologist			
2020	Wenju Cai	Climatologist			
2020	Peter Currie	Stem cell biologist			
2020	Andrew Cuthbertson				
2020	Aurore Delaigle	Statistician			
2020	Cathy Foley		1957		
2020	Gary Froyland	Mathematician			
2020	Kevin Galvin	Chemical engineer			
2020	Adele Green	Epidemiologist	1952		
2020	Kate Jolliffe	Organic chemist			
2020	Ping Koy Lam	Quantum physics			
2020	Ryan Lister	Epigeneticist			
2020	Justin Marshall	Marine biologist and neuroscientist	1962		
2020	Harvey Millar	Plant biochemist	1971		
2020	Lidia Morawska	Aerosol physicist	1952		
2020	Robyn Owens	Mathematician (computer vision)			
2020	Ian Paulsen	Microbiologist			
2020	Simon Poole	Photonics engineer			
2020	Andrew Roberts	Clinical haematologist			
2020	Alan Rowan	Physical organic chemist			
2020	Jenny Stauber	Ecotoxicologist			
2021	Steven Chown	Antarctic ecologist			
2021	Arthur Christopoulos	Molecular pharmacologist			
2021	Gregory Clark				
2021	Susan Coppersmith	Condensed matter physicist	1957		
2021	Brendan Crabb	Microbiologist	1966		
2021	Mark Dawson	Cancer biologist			
2021	Yihong Du	Mathematician			
2021	Robin Gasser	Parasitologist			
2021	Glenda Halliday	Neuroscientist			
2021	Rob Hyndman	Statistician	1967		
2021	Dorrit Jacob	Geochemist			
2021	Catherine Lovelock	Ecologist	1964		
2021	Barbara Nowak				
2021	Andrew Pitman				
2021	Barry Pogson	Plant biologist			
2021	Ian Reid	Computer vision researcher			
2021	Alison Rodger	Biochemist	1959		
2021	John Sader				
2021	Margaret Sheil				
2021	Gordon Smyth	Genomic statistician			
2021	Svetha Venkatesh	Computer scientist			
2021	Hala Zreiqat				
2022	Matthew Bailes	Astrophyscist			
2022	Katherine Belov	Biologist	1973		
2022	Marcela Bilek	Physicist	1968		
2022	Stuart Bunn	Freshwater ecologist			
2022	Thomas Calma	Chancellor	1953		
2022	John Cannon	Pure mathematician			
2022	Jonathan Carapetis	Paediatric physician	1961		
2022	Elizabeth A. Fulton	Ecosystem modeller	1973		
2022	Catherine Greenhill	Pure mathematician			
2022	Michelle Haber	Oncologist			
2022	Peter Høj	Vice-Chancellor	1957		
2022	Timothy Hughes	Haematologist			
2022	Emma Johnston	Marine ecologist	1973	2025	
2022	Peter Langridge	Agricultural researcher			
2022	Janice Lough	Climate scientist			
2022	Naomi McClure-Griffiths	Astronomer	1975		
2022	Sarah Medland	Statistical geneticist			
2022	Ute Roessner	Plant scientist	1971		
2022	Craig T. Simmons	Groundwater scientist			
2022	Kate Smith-Miles	Applied mathematician			
2022	Huijin Zhao	Chemist			
2022	Albert Zomaya	Computer scientist			
2023	Tim Brodribb	Plant biology			
2023	Liming Dai	Photovoltaics			
2023	Mariapia Degli-Esposti	Biology			
2023	Michael Fuhrer	Physics			
2023	Zaiping Guo	Nanotechnology			
2023	Elaine Holmes	Computational chemistry			
2023	David Keith	Plant biology			
2023	David Komander	Biology			
2023	Sharon Lewin	Medical sciences			
2023	Jian Li	Drug design			
2023	Belinda Medlyn	Plant physiology			
2023	Louis-Noël Moresi	Geophysics			
2023	Richard James Payne	Chemical biology			
2023	Shizhang Qiao	Chemical engineering			
2023	Pankaj Sah	Neuroscience			
2023	Brajesh Singh	Soil ecology			
2023	Peter Taylor	Mathematics			
2023	Leslie Weston	Plant biology			
2023	Andrew Wilks	Biology			
2023	Xinghuo Yu	Electrical engineering			
2024	Nerilie Abram	Climate change	1977		
2024	Andrew Blakers	Engineering			
2024	Rachelle Buchbinder	Epidemiology	1958		
2024	Kylie Catchpole	Photovoltaics			
2024	Louisa Degenhardt	Psychiatry			
2024	Calum Drummond	Molecular science			
2024	Mary Garson	Organic chemistry	1953		
2024	Arthur Georges	Ecology			
2024	Ros Gleadow	Plant biology	1955		
2024	Dmitri Golberg	Physics			
2024	Michael Kearney	Ecology			
2024	Matthew Kiernan	Neuroscience			
2024	Glenn King	Protein drug discovery and development			
2024	Mark R. Krumholz	Physics			
2024	Zheng-Xiang Li	Geoscience			
2024	Georgina Long	Cancer biology			
2024	Shahar Mendelson	Mathematics			
2024	Budiman Minasny	Soil science			
2024	Jose Polo	Biochemistry			
2024	Hrvoje Tkalčić	Planetary science	1970		
2024	Gene Tyson	Microbial ecology			
2024	Madeleine van Oppen	Climate adaptation			
2024	Lianzhou Wang	Photovoltaics			
2024	Willy Zwaenepoel	Computer science			
2025	David Adams				
2025	Gabrielle Belz				
2025	Josep Canadell				
2025	Deli Chen				
2025	Helen Christensen				
2025	Tamara Davis				
2025	Jeffery Errington				
2025	Jürgen Götz				
2025	Xiaojing Hao				
2025	Mark Howden	Environmental scientist			
2025	David Huang				
2025	Trevor Ireland				
2025	Marlene Kanga				
2025	Derek Leinweber				
2025	Robert Mahony				
2025	Richard Middleton				
2025	Christina Mitchell				
2025	Andrew Nash				
2025	Jessica Purcell				
2025	Clare Scott				
2025	Aidan Sims				
2025	Michael Stumpf				
2025	Rajeev Varshney				
2025	Guoxiu Wang				
2025	Nicole Webster				
2025	Anthony Weiss				
2026	Nicole Bell				
2026	Celine Boehm				
2026	Philip Boyd				
2026	Cyrille Boyer				
2026	Jochen Brocks				
2026	Graeme Cumming				
2026	Kishan Dholakia				
2026	Andrew Dzurak				
2026	Aleksandra Filipovska				
2026	Jen Flegg				
2026	Bob Furbank				
2026	Katherine Kedzierska				
2026	Yun Liu				
2026	Sherene Loi				
2026	John Long				
2026	Laura Mackay				
2026	Stefan Maier				
2026	Paul Martin	Neuroscientist	1958		
2026	Nicki Packer				
2026	Deborah Rathjen				
2026	David Raubenheimer				
2026	Tim Schmidt				
2026	Ajay Sood				
2026	Enrico Valdinoci				
2026	Huanting Wang				
2026	Sally Williams				
2026	Alpha Yap				
2026	Yong-Guan Zhu				

== Corresponding Members ==
Yr	Fellow	Notes	Born	Died	Refs
1977	John Cornforth		1917	2013	
1982	Frederick Sanger		1918	2013	
1983	Henry Harris		1925	2014	
1985	Edward Slater	Biochemist	1917	2016	
1986	Jean Bernard	French physician and haematologist	1907	2006	
1986	Olle E. Bjorkman	Biologist	1933	2021	
1990	Peter H. Raven	Botanist	1936		
1991	Robert May		1936	2020	
1992	Michael Atiyah		1929	2019	
1992	Vaughan Jones		1952	2020	
1996	Rolf Martin Zinkernagel	Immunologist	1944		
1999	Bertil Andersson		1948		
1999	Ronald Oxburgh		1934		
2002	Joseph Hurd Connell		1923	2020	
2002	Charles Krebs		1936		
2004	John S. Boyer		1937		
2004	Gunnar Öquist		1941		
2005	Marc Feldmann		1944		
2005	Lu Yongxiang	Mechanical engineer	1942		
2006	Rodney Brooks	Robotics and computer science	1954		
2006	Terry Tao	Mathematician	1975		
2007	Elizabeth Blackburn		1948		
2007	Michael James David Powell		1936	2015	
2008	David Attenborough	Broadcaster and naturalist	1926		
2008	A. David Buckingham		1930	2021	
2011	John Dewey	Geologist	1937		
2012	Bruce William Stillman	Biochemist	1953		
2012	Brian Lawn	materials scientist			
2013	Chunli Bai	Chemist and nanotechnologist	1953		
2013	Birger Moller	Plant biologist	1946		
2014	Philip Cohen	Biochemist	1945		
2015	Jill Banfield	Geomicrobiologist and biogeochemist	1959		
2015	C. N. R. Rao	Chemist	1934		
2016	Matthias Hentze		1960		
2016	John C. H. Spence		1946	2021	
2022	Anne Dell	Biochemist	1950		
2022	Lei Jiang	Chemist and material scientist			
2023	Peter Taylor	Mathematician and statistician			
2025	Donna Strickland	Physicist	1959		
2025	Hiroaki Suga	Biochemist	1963		
