= Flegg =

Flegg is a surname. Notable people with the name include:

- Bob Flegg (1918–44), Australian rules footballer
- Bruce Flegg (born 1954), Australian politician
- Chris Flegg (late 20th c.), British singer, guitarist and songwriter
- Jennifer Flegg, Australian mathematician
- Jersey Flegg (1878–1960), Anglo-Australian rugby league player and administrator
- Jim Flegg (1937–2024), British ornithologist and writer

== See also ==
- Jersey Flegg Cup, junior rugby league competition in New South Wales
- Flegg High School, Martham, Norfolk, England
