= Brijesh =

Brijesh (Devanagari: बृजेश brijeś) or Brijesh (Brijesh) is an Indian given name. It is an epithet of the Hindu god Krishna and its literal meaning is "king of Braj", a region in northern India that is associated with the childhood of Krishna.

== Notable persons with this name ==
=== Brijesh ===
- Brijesh Damani (born 1982), professional snooker player
- Brijesh Dhar Jayal (born 1935), Indian Air Force officer
- Brijesh Kumar Gupta, Nepalese politician
- Brijesh Lawrence (born 1989), Saint Kitts and Nevis sprinter
- Brijesh Patel (born 1952), cricketer
- Brijesh Shandilya, playback singer from Uttar Pradesh
- Brijesh Singh, BJP politician from Uttar Pradesh

=== Brajesh ===
- Brajesh Katheriya, Indian politician
- Brajesh Mishra (1928–2012), diplomat and politician
- Brajesh Pathak (born 1962), politician and minister in the government of Uttar Pradesh
- Brajesh Katheriya, politician from the Samajwadi Party of Uttar Pradesh
- Brajesh K. Singh, Indian-Australian soil scientist, ecologist, researcher and academic
- Brajesh Singh (died 1966), politician from the Communist Party
