= Transfer cell =

Specialized plant cells

Transfer cells are specialized parenchyma cells that have an increased surface area, due to infoldings of the plasma membrane. They facilitate the transport of sugars from a sugar source, mainly mature leaves, to a sugar sink, often developing leaves or fruits. They are found in nectaries of flowers and some carnivorous plants. Transfer cells are specially found in plants in the region of absorption or secretion of nutrients.

The term transfer cell was coined by Brian Gunning and John Stewart Pate. Their presence is generally correlated with the existence of extensive solute influxes across the plasma membrane.

== Structure and function ==
Transfer cells occur in every major plant group—from algae through angiosperms—and are consistently located where solutes must be rapidly loaded or unloaded, such as minor leaf veins, seed coats, nectaries and carnivorous plant glands. Their hallmark is a secondary wall that grows inward as a labyrinth of flange- or reticulate-shaped ingrowths, greatly enlarging the plasma membrane surface available for transport proteins. The cytoplasm around these ingrowths is densely packed with mitochondria and elements of the secretory system, while vacuoles are reduced or absent, reflecting the high metabolic cost of sustained solute fluxes.

Much of that flux is driven by proton gradients. Electrogenic H^{+}-ATPases in the infolded membrane establish membrane potentials of −150 to −200 mV, energising proton-coupled symporters for sucrose, amino acids and other nutrients. Patch clamp and gene expression studies show that both the pumps and several Ca^{2+}-ATPases are upregulated in developing transfer cells, ensuring a rapid recycling of ions and signalling Ca^{2+} needed to coordinate wall deposition and transporter delivery.

== Development and induction ==
Transfer cells arise by trans-differentiation: a mature epidermal, pericycle or vascular parenchyma cell first de-differentiates, then re-programmes its wall-building machinery to lay down the ingrowth network. Although the upstream signal cascade is still being resolved, maize studies identified the Myb-related protein 1 (MRP1) as a key transcriptional activator that switches on multiple transfer-cell-specific genes (BETL-1, BETL-2, MEG-1, TCRR-1). Comparable transcriptional profiles have since been reported for Arabidopsis and faba bean, suggesting a conserved regulatory module across seed plants.

Biotic stress can also trigger the programme. Sedentary root knot and cyst nematodes, for example, remodel cortical and vascular cells into giant cells or syncytia that display the same wall-ingrowth architecture and transporter enrichment found in canonical transfer cells; these modified cells serve as powerful nutrient sinks for the parasite's entire life cycle. The induction of such nematode feeding sites therefore provides a tractable model for dissecting the hormonal and mechanical cues—particularly auxin spikes and local wall-stress signals—that initiate transfer-cell differentiation in plant.
