= Shizhang Qiao =

Australian scientist and professor

Shizhang Qiao FAA is an Australian researcher, material scientist, and chair professor at the School of Chemical Engineering and Advanced Materials, University of Adelaide. He specialises in nanostructured materials for electrocatalysis, batteries, and photocatalysis.

He was the 2021 recipient of the SA Scientist of the Year for energy conversion and storage technologies. He was elected a Fellow of the Australian Academy of Science in 2023, alongside Professor Zaiping Guo and Tim Brodribb.

== Education and career ==
Shizhang was educated at Tianjin University of Science and Technology, where he obtained a Bachelor of Science and a Master's Degree. He holds a doctorate degree (Ph.D.) from the Hong Kong University of Science and Technology. He is an Australian Laureate Fellow and the Editor-in-Chief of the Royal Society of Chemistry's EES Catalysis Journal, the Journal of Energy and Environmental Catalysis. He is a Fellow of the Institution of Chemical Engineers and a Thomson Reuters and Clarivate Analytics Highly Cited Researcher.

Shizhang is one of the most cited Australian researchers. As of 2026, his research articles had been cited over 150,000 times, with an h-index of 205 and an i10-index of 556. His publications titled "design of electrocatalysts for oxygen-and hydrogen-involving energy conversion reactions" and "Anatase TiO_{2} single crystals with a large percentage of reactive facets" are his most cited works.
