= Scientist of the Year Award (disambiguation) =

The Scientist of the Year Award is a Korean award.

Scientist of the Year Award may also refer to:

- NSW Scientist of the Year, awarded by the New South Wales Government, Australia
- SA Scientist of the Year, awarded by the South Australian Government

== See also ==
- Prime Minister's Prizes for Science, Australian awards including prizes for Life Scientist of the Year and Physical Scientist of the Year
- Young Scientists of the Year, a former BBC television series (from 1966 to 1981)
