= Brodribb (surname) =

Brodribb is a surname. Notable people by that name include:

- Gerald Brodribb (1915–1999), cricket historian and archaeologist
- John Henry Brodribb, the birth name of actor Henry Irving (1838–1905)
- Harry Brodribb Irving (1870–1919), British actor
- John Brodribb Bergne (1800–1873), English official, numismatist and antiquary
- Laurence Sydney Brodribb Irving (1871–1914), English writer
- Tim Brodribb, Australian evolutionary biologist
