= John Stewart Pate =

Plant physiologist

John Stewart Pate AM FAA FRS
- Born: 15 January 1932; Ilford, UK
- Died: 1 July 2023 (aged 91)
- Education: Queen's University, Belfast
- Spouse(s): Elizabeth (died 2004); Trudy
- Children: 3
- Awards: AM FAA FRS
- Scientific career
- Workplaces: Queen's University, Belfast; University of Western Australia

John Stewart Pate AM FAA FRS (15 January 1932 – 1 July 2023) was a plant scientist at Queen's University Belfast and University of Western Australia. He was the co-discoverer of the function of transfer cells. He worked on carbon-nitrogen relationships, particularly in legumes and also the ecophysiology of the native flora of Western Australia.

== Education and personal life ==
Pate was born on 15 January 1932 in Ilford in Essex in the UK. His interest in plants started as a child when his family grew food during the Second World War.

He studied at Queen's University, Belfast, obtaining BSc (Hons) in 1953 followed by MSc in 1954 and his doctorate in 1956. He worked as an Assistant Lecturer between 1954 and 1956 while working towards his doctorate. He was awarded a DSc in 1965.

Pate played the piano, organ and trombone in a local orchestra and church. He was married twice and had 3 sons. He died 1 July 2023.

== Research career ==
Pate moved to Australia and took up a post as Lecturer in Botany at the University of Sydney from 1957 to 1960. He then returned to be Lecturer in Botany at Queen's University between 1960 and 1965 and was subsequently promoted to Reader in 1965 and then awarded a Personal Chair of Plant Physiology in 1970. In 1973 he returned to Australia as Professor and Head of Department of Botany at the University of Western Australia until he retired in 2000 and was awarded the title of Emeritus Professor. He was an enthusiastic lecturer and inspired students.

His research focused on plant ecology and physiology, particularly the relationship between the phloem and xylem and carbon and nitrogen transfer. He made extensive investigations of the latter in root nodules, using peas as an experimental system, inspired by his childhood experiences. Together with Brian Gunning, he identified the role of transfer cells that increase rates of solute transfer between tissues. He also led work on the native flora of Western Australia, using his expertise to increase understanding of how the plants dealt with stressful environments, through both anatomical and physiological adaptations especially to their roots. His work helped increase productivity of pastures and crops, and also development of more sustainable land management systems. He was very competitive and demanding but could also be friendly and keen to share knowledge.

After retirement in 2000 he moved to Denmark and continued plant research as well as starting studies into animal behaviour.

== Scientific publications ==
Pate was the author of over 500 scientific publications including books, monographs and research papers. Among the most significant are:

Books:

- John Pate, Tina Bell and Bill Verboom (2020) Unravelling the secret life of roots UWA Publishing, ISBN 978-1-76080-020-8

Research papers:

- Cernusak, LA; Farquhar, GD and Pate, JS (2005) Environmental and physiological controls over oxygen and carbon isotope composition of Tasmanian blue gum, Eucalyptus globulus. Tree Physiology 25 (2) 129 - 146.
- Unkovich, MJ and Pate, JS (2000) An appraisal of recent field measurements of symbiotic N2 fixation by annual legumes. Field Crops Research 65 (2-3) 211 - 228.
- T. E. Dawson and J. S. Pate (1996) Seasonal water uptake and movement in root systems of Australian phraeatophytic plants of dimorphic root morphology: A stable isotope investigation. Oecologia 107 (1) 13 - 20.
- John S Pate, Raymond H Froend, Barbara J. Bowen, Annette Hansen and John Kuo (1990) Seedling Growth and Storage Characteristics of Seeder and Resprouter Species of Mediterranean-type Ecosystems of S. W. Australia. Annals of Botany 65 (6) 585 – 601.
- P. J. Hocking and J. S. Pate (1977) Mobilization of Minerals to Developing Seeds of Legumes. Annals of Botany 41 (6) 1259 – 1278.
- J. S. Pate, P. J. Sharkey & O. A. M. Lewis (1975) Xylem to phloem transfer of solutes in fruiting shoots of legumes, studied by a phloem bleeding technique. Planta 122 11 – 26.
- A. M. Flinn and J. S. Pate (1970) A Quantitative Study of Carbon Transfer from Pod and Subtending Leaf to the Ripening Seeds of the Field Pea (Pisum arvense L.). Journal of Experimental Botany 21 (1) 71 – 82.
- B. E. S. Gunning and J. S. Pate (1969) "Transfer cells" Plant cells with wall ingrowths, specialized in relation to short distance transport of solutes—Their occurrence, structure, and development. Protoplasma 68 107 – 133.
- B. E. S. Gunning, J. S. Pate and L. G. Briarty (1968) Specialised "transfer cells" in minor veins of leaves and their possible significance in phloem translocation. Journal of Cell Biology 37 (3) C7 – 12.
- W. Wallace and J.S. Pate (1965) Nitrate reductase in field pea (Pisum arvense L) Annals of Botany 29 (116), pp. 655 – 671.

Reviews:

- J. S. Pate (1980) Transport and partitioning of nitrogenous solutes. Annual Review of Plant Physiology 31 313 - 340
- J. S. Pate and B. E. S. Gunning (1972) Annual Review of Plant Physiology 23 173-196

== Awards ==
Pate was elected to be a Fellow of the Australian Academy of Science in 1980, for his work on the carbon and nitrogen economy of legumes and a Fellow of the Royal Society in 1985. In 2005 he was awarded the Centenary Medal and also received an Honorary DSc from the University of Western Australia. In 2017 he was inducted into the WA Science Hall of Fame. In 2023 he was appointed a Member of the Order of Australia (AM) for his significant service to botany, and to tertiary education.
