= Roland Andrews =

Roland Stuart Andrews CMG DSc FAA, (20 September 1897 (Granville, Sydney) – 14 October 1961 (Glen Iris, Melbourne)), was an industrial chemist and administrator.

== Education ==
Andrews graduated in science at the University of Sydney in 1919.
