= Clifford Walter Emmens =

English-born Australian veterinary scientist and biometrician

Clifford Walter Emmens (19 December 1913, Peckham, London – 22 June 1999) was an English-born Australian veterinary scientist and biometrician. He was appointed Professor of Veterinary Physiology at the University of Sydney in 1950, and elected Fellow of the Australian Academy of Science in 1956.
