= Barbara Nowak =

Polish-Australian ichthyologist

- Education: University of Agriculture, Szczecin Poland; University of Sydney
- Scientific career
- Workplaces: University of Tasmania
- Thesis: Endosulfan residues in freshwater fish and effects of these residues on tissue structure (1991)

Barbara F. Nowak FAA is a Polish-born Australian ichthyologist who specialises in sustainable aquaculture and aquatic animal health. As of 2021 she is Professor and Associate Dean Research Training at the University of Tasmania.

Nowak graduated from the University of Agriculture, Szczecin Poland with a MSc in 1982. She received a PhD in 1991 from the University of Sydney for her thesis, "Endosulfan residues in freshwater fish and effects of these residues on tissue structure".

== Research ==
Nowak has spoken on the role of ocean parasites in marine environments in Tasmania. She has examined the role of fish kills in fisheries, and researched vaccines used to prevent illnesses experienced by fish in aquaculture settings.

== Selected publications ==
- Nowak, Barbara (1 July 1992). "Histological changes in gills induced by residues of endosulfan". Aquatic Toxicology. 23 (1): 65–83. Bibcode:1992AqTox..23...65N. doi:10.1016/0166-445X(92)90012-C. ISSN 0166-445X.
- Clark, A.; Nowak, B F. (1999). "Field investigations of amoebic gill disease in Atlantic salmon, Salmo salar L., in Tasmania". Journal of Fish Diseases. 22 (6): 433–443. Bibcode:1999JFDis..22..433C. doi:10.1046/j.1365-2761.1999.00175.x. ISSN 0140-7775.
- Adams, M B; Nowak, B F (2003). "Amoebic gill disease: sequential pathology in cultured Atlantic salmon, Salmo salar L.". Journal of Fish Diseases. 26 (10): 601–614. Bibcode:2003JFDis..26..601A. doi:10.1046/j.1365-2761.2003.00496.x. ISSN 0140-7775. PMID 14653318.
- Nowak, Barbara F. (1 May 2007). "Parasitic diseases in marine cage culture – An example of experimental evolution of parasites?". International Journal for Parasitology. 37 (6): 581–588. doi:10.1016/j.ijpara.2007.01.003. ISSN 0020-7519. PMID 17316650.

== Honors and awards ==
Nowak was elected a Fellow of the Australian Society for Parasitology in 2018. In 2021 she was elected Fellow of the Australian Academy of Science.
