= Marianne Frommer =

Australian geneticist

Marianne Frommer FAA is an Australian geneticist. She was born in Hong Kong and educated at the University of Sydney – BSc(Hons) 1969 and PhD in 1976. She is best known for developing a protocol to map DNA methylation by bisulphite genomic sequencing.

== Career ==
Early in her career, Frommer investigated the molecular biology of "satellite DNAs" in the human genome. She and her colleague Jane Prosser showed that classical satellites were all A+T-rich simple repeated sequences. Another important result was the identification of an Alu (SINE) sequence as part of the repeat unit in Satellite 1, thereby showing that SINEs could be a highly repeated component of centromeric heterochromatin.

Frommer then determined the chromosomal locations of the major simple-sequence repeats by devising a new method of non-radioactive labelling, based on incorporation of bromodeoxyuridine into single-stranded probes. The method was used to localise satellite repeats very precisely. This research led to the observation of methylation patterns at CpG dinucleotides in sequenced genomic repeated DNA.

In 1984, Frommer spent a study leave in the laboratory of Adrian Bird, and took part in the characterisation of what were then termed HTF (HpaII Tiny Fragments) islands in mammalian genomes. She and her PhD student Margaret Gardiner-Garden were able to identify these genomic components by DNA sequence characteristics alone, without prior knowledge of methylation status, and gave them the name "CpG islands. They showed that CpG islands are a distinct feature of vertebrate genomes and that CpG islands are associated with genes. They showed that the majority of neural and neuroendocrine genes were associated with CpG islands and therefore proposed that CpG islands facilitate regulated transcription from neural precursors and developing neural tissue in the early embryo.

In 1998 Frommer realised that it should be possible to amplify the products of a DNA deamination reaction and distinguish methylated and unmethylated molecules by dideoxy-sequencing. Frommer's protocol yielded a clear positive display of methylcytosine residues. The PCR products of bisulphite reactions could be sequenced directly to measure the extent of methylation at any CpG site in a population of DNA molecules. The particular strength of the method was that cloning and sequencing of the PCR products yielded methylation patterns or "maps" of single DNA molecules.

Frommer and her colleagues have also developed a powerful model system to study the molecular biology of behavioural characteristics and evolutionary processes using native Australian fruit flies.

== Awards ==
Frommer was elected as a fellow of the Australian Academy of Science in 2010. She worked part-time for two periods of her career.
