= William Christopher Swinbank =

British-Australian meteorologist

William Christopher Swinbank (8 May 1913 – 28 December 1973) was a British-born meteorological physicist who worked at the UK Meteorological Office, the CSIRO Australia and the NCAR Colorado. His main areas of research were fog prediction, upper atmosphere analysis, wind predictions, hail storms and turbulent fluxes.

== Early life ==
William Swinbank was born on 8 May 1913 in the small coal mining village of Easington in County Durham, UK where his father worked above ground at a local colliery as a mechanical engineer. Swinbank was the oldest of three boys. He won a scholarship to Henry Smith Grammar School in Hartlepool and went up to Durham University (Hatfield College) where he took a Double Honours in Mathematics and Physics, graduating 1934.

== Career ==
After leaving university, Swinbank worked briefly as a schoolteacher and also in industrial research. In 1938 he commenced working as a meteorologist at the UK Met Office.

=== The Met Office 1938–1948 ===
In 1938, Swinbank began work as a Met Office Technical Officer for the Air Ministry and was attached to various RAF bases to carry out weather forecasting duties. In 1940, he was given the task of investigating the issue of fog, since this was critical to the operations of an airbase. He initially worked with C.S. Durst in the areas of cloud physics and turbulence. In 1942 he moved to the forecasting headquarters at RAF Dunstable in Bedfordshire and continued his research on fog. During this time, he worked with C.H.B. Priestley, P. A Sheppard and Sverre Petterssen and came to the realisation that fog needed to be studied in relation to larger weather systems. He joined the Upper Air Unit at Dunstable which was headed by Petterssen and as the war progressed, Swinbank became more involved in the use of upper air analysis forecasting techniques and further developed the use of isobaric analysis for producing the synoptic charts used for weather forecasting. His research into predicting fog was valuable for guiding returning RAF bombers back to base after bombing raids in the early morning over Germany as fog was most prevalent in these hours. In 1944, RAF Dunstable played an important role in forecasting the weather patterns leading up to the D-Day landings and Swinbank, along with Priestly and Andrezej Berson were involved in this forecasting. After the war, Swinbank returned to the study of fog as well as agricultural physics and worked closely with the meteorologist H. L. Penman. In 1947 Swinbank and Priestley wrote a paper titled The Vertical Transfer of Heat by Turbulence in the Atmosphere, a paper that was acknowledged as being a landmark in micrometeorology and laid the foundation for the development of eddy covariance.

=== CSIRO 1948–1969 ===
In 1948, Swinbank moved to Australia to take up a position in the newly formed section of Meteorological Physics (later renamed Atmospheric Physics) at the Commonwealth Scientific and Industrial Research Organisation in Aspendale, a suburb of Melbourne. He worked with C. H. B. Priestley who had joined the organisation two years earlier. His early work at the organisation was in micrometeorolgy where he developed the use of hot wire anemometry for the direct measurement of the turbulent fluxes of heat, water vapour and momentum. This research was presented at the International Symposium on Atmospheric Turbulence in the Boundary Layer at MIT in 1951. In the discussion following Swinbank's presentation, one participant commented thus: "We have had to rely too much on hypothesis and conjecture in the processing and analysis of micrometeorological observations due to the fact that most observers did not measure the totality of atmospheric elements. I want to complement the group in Australia for the collection of the complete, detailed and accurate data on eddy fluxes." Swinbank was an advocate for large scale atmospheric field experiments and between 1962 and 1964 established research projects in Kerang (Vic) and later on in Hay (NSW) for the recording of accurate data for later analysis. These experiments recorded wind, temperature and moisture in the atmosphere, initially to a height of 16 metres, and later to 32 metres. In the later experiments at Hay, measurements were taken up to 1000 metres. Swinbank was instrumental in the establishment of ozone monitoring in Australia.

=== NCAR 1969–1973 ===
In 1969, Swinbank took leave of absence from the CSIRO to work at the NCAR in Colorado. He was free to pursue his work on turbulence and the boundary layer. In 1971, he was appointed Director of the National Hail Research Experiment (NHRE), and consequently resigned from the CSIRO. The NHRE developed in response to the impacts of hailstorms on crops in the Mid-West. By taking detailed atmospheric measurements within the storm cell, it was hoped that a storm could be seeded with silver oxide to break up the moisture into rain or small hail and so prevent the development of large destructive hailstones. The project ran for five years until 1976.

== Personal life ==
In 1939 Swinbank married Ivy Hook and they had a daughter, Susan. Both Ivy and Susan died in 1940 within a day of each other. In 1942 he met Angela Pinney while they were both working at RAF Dunstable in Bedfordshire and they married in December of that year. In 1948, Swinbank, his wife and two children moved to Australia and lived in Mt Eliza near Melbourne. He came to Australia to work in the newly founded CSIRO. They had four more children. In 1969, Swinbank took up a position at NCAR in Colorado and he died in Boulder on 28 December 1973. In May 1974, the Boundary-Layer Meteorology journal published a memorial edition to which colleagues from around the world contributed articles.

== Awards ==
- 1941 Elected Fellow of the Royal Meteorological Society
- 1968 Winner of the Buchan Prize by the Royal Meteorological Society (in conjunction with A. J. Dyer)
- 1970 Elected Fellow of the Australian Academy of Science
- Fellow of the Australian Institute of Physics

== Selected publications ==
- Priestley, C. H. B and Swinbank, W. C. (1947) Vertical transport of heat by turbulence in the atmosphere Proc. R. Soc. Lond. A189: 543–56
- Swinbank, W. C. (1948) Note on the formation of fog over a snow surface. Quarterly Journal of the Royal Meteorological Society. 1948; Vol 74(Issue 321-322):406-407.
- Swinbank, W. C. (1949) Prediction diagrams for radiation fog. Durham theses, Durham University. Available at Durham E-Theses Online: http://etheses.dur.ac.uk/10469/
- Swinbank, W. C. (1951) The measurement of vertical transfer of heat and water vapor by eddies in the lower atmosphere. Journal of Meteorology. 1951; 8(3):135-145
- Swinbank, W. C. (1956) The physics of natural evaporation. Australian Meteorological Magazine. 1956; (14):58-59.
- Swinbank, W. C. (1960) Wind profile in thermally stratified flow. Nature. 1960; 186(4723):463-464.
- Swinbank, W. C. (1963) Long‐wave radiation from clear skies. Quarterly Journal of the Royal Meteorological Society, 89(381):339-348. doi: 10.1002/QJ.49708938105
- Swinbank, W. C and Dyer A.J. (1967) An experimental study in micro-meteorology. Quarterly Journal of the Royal Meteorological Society. Vol 93 (Issue 398):494-500.
- Swinbank, W. C. & Dyer, A. J. (1968). Micrometeorological expeditions 1962-1964. Melbourne: C.S.I.R.O
- Swinbank, W. C. (1970). Structure of wind and the shearing stress in the planetary boundary layer. Archiv Für Meteorologie, Geophysik Und Bioklimatologie, Serie A, 19, 1–12.
