= Alan Cowman =

Australian medical researcher (born 1954)

Alan Cowman AC FRS FAA
- Born: Alan Frederick Cowman; 27 December 1954 (age 71)
- Education: Griffith University (BSc); University of Melbourne (PhD)
- Scientific career
- Fields: Malaria; Microbiology; Parasitology
- Workplaces: Walter and Eliza Hall Institute of Medical Research; University of California, Berkeley
- Thesis: Genes of the protozoan parasite Babesia bovis (1983)
- Doctoral advisor: David J. Kemp
- Website: wehi.edu.au/people/alan-cowman

Alan Frederick Cowman AC, FRS, FAA, CorrFRSE, FAAHMS, FASP, FASM (born 27 December 1954) is an internationally acclaimed malaria researcher whose work specialises in researching the malaria-causing parasite, Plasmodium falciparum, and the molecular mechanisms it uses to evade host responses and antimalarial drugs. As of May 2024, he is the deputy directory and Laboratory Head of the Walter and Eliza Hall Institute of Medical Research (WEHI) in Melbourne, and his laboratory continues to work on understanding how Plasmodium falciparum, infects humans and causes disease. He was elected as a fellow of the Royal Society in 2011 and awarded the Companion of the Order of Australia in 2019 for his "eminent service to the biological sciences, notably to molecular parasitology, to medical research and scientific education, and as a mentor."

== Education ==
Cowman was awarded his Bachelor of Science (honours) from Griffith University in 1979 and received his PhD from WEHI and the University of Melbourne in 1984, with David Kemp as his supervisor. His PhD thesis involved the cattle parasite Babesia bovis: in conjunction with other students they developed cloning, immunochemical and recombinant DNA techniques to analyze the parasite. This was followed by two postdoctoral projects and further exploring the malaria parasite at WEHI. He then took up a postdoctoral position to study Drosophila at the University of California, Berkeley in 1984. He was awarded an honorary doctorate from QUT university in Brisbane, Australia in 2020.

== Career ==
Cowman returned to WEHI in 1986, and concentrated his research on genes that make malaria parasites resistant to drugs. In 1999 he was appointed head of the division of infection and immunity, a position which he held until he was appointed deputy director of WEHI in 2015. He also holds honorary professorships with the University of Melbourne and Harvard University.

Cowman's work has been supported by a senior principal research fellowship from the NHMRC since 2018, a Wellcome Trust Australian senior research fellowship in 1988, then by three successive international research scholarships from the Howard Hughes Medical Institute. He held an Australia fellowship from 2007 to 2012.

His research focus has been on protozoan infections, in particular the cause of malaria (Plasmodium falciparum), which kill over 400,000 people each year world-wide. He made significant advances in understanding the molecular mechanisms which the malaria parasites use to take over human cells, and how they evade the body's natural defenses. He found that once malaria parasites take over human red blood cells, and remodels them so they can reproduce without triggering the patient's immune system. He also investigated how the parasites build resistance to antimalarial drugs. These two lines of research have helped to guide the development of new drugs, supplemented by his team's monitoring the spread of drug resistance strains. He also conducts research into the genetic properties of the parasite, and he was the first researcher to develop a live genetically attenuated vaccine of P. falciparum.

== Publications ==
Cowman has published extensively: as of January 2023, Google Scholar listed over 350 of his papers, and 48,669 citations of his works. Google Scholar calculated his h-index as 124, while Scopus gave it as 91.

== Honours and awards ==
1993 Gottschalk Medal for Medical Science and Biology from the Australian Academy of Science
1994 ASBMB Boehringer-Mannheim Medal
1998 Glaxo Award for Advanced Research in Infectious Diseases
2001 Centenary Medal awarded by the Australian government
2001 Fellow, Australian Academy of Science
2006 Lemberg Medal awarded by the Australian Society of Biochemistry and Molecular Biology
2010 Howard Taylor Ricketts Medal from the University of Chicago
2010 Glaxo-Wellcome Australia Medal
2010-2014 president, World Federation of Parasitology
2011 Fellow of The Royal Society
2013 Victoria Prize for Science and Innovation, Victorian Government and veski
2013 Mahathir Science Award, Malaysia
2014 Award for Research Excellence from the Federation of Asian and Oceanian Biochemists and Molecular Biologists
2016 Wellcome Trust grant for development of antimalarial drugs with Merck & Co., Inc.
2016 Research Excellence Award from the Australian National Health and Medical Research Council (NHMRC) recognising outstanding performance and excellence in health and medical research innovation.
2019 Fellow, Australian Academy of Health and Medical Sciences (FAHMS)
2019 Companion of the Order of Australia
2020 Corresponding Fellow, The Royal Society (Edinburgh)

== Professional activities ==
=== Professional societies ===
Australia Society for Parasitology

Australian Society for Microbiology

Australian Academy of Science

The Royal Society (United Kingdom)

Australian Society for Biochemistry and Molecular Biology (ASBMB)

=== Selected international and national committees ===
2010–14 president, World Federation of Parasitologists

2010, 2015, 2020 member, quinquennial review committee, Welcome Sanger Institute, Cambridge, UK

2013 chair, 'Target identification for malaria drug discovery' Bill and Melinda Gates Foundation 2013-

2013-2022 member, appointments and promotion committee QIMR Berghofer, Queensland, Australia

2014 fellow appointment panel, Howard Hughes Medical Institute, Washington, USA

2015 Malaria Eradication Scientific Alliance, chair of working group, Boston, USA
