= SA Scientist of the Year =

Annual science award in South Australia

The SA Scientist of the Year is awarded by the South Australian State Government for eminence in science as part of the annual SA Science Excellence and Innovation Awards.

== Recipients ==
- 2007 John Ralston, University of South Australia
- 2008 John Hopwood, SAHMRI
- 2009 Robert Norman, University of Adelaide
- 2010 Tanya Monro, University of Adelaide and Angel F Lopez, SA Pathology
- 2011 Peter Langridge, University of Adelaide
- 2012 Karen Reynolds, Flinders University
- 2013 Graeme Young, Flinders University
- 2014 Tony Thomas, University of Adelaide
- 2015 Craig Simmons, Flinders University
- 2016 Alan J. Cooper, University of Adelaide
- 2017 James Paton, University of Adelaide
- 2018 Richard Hillis, University of Adelaide
- 2019 Jozef Gécz, University of Adelaide for research of neurodevelopmental disability
- 2020 Colin Raston Flinders University and Sharad Kumar University of South Australia
- 2021 Shizhang Qiao, University of Adelaide for energy conversion and storage technologies

== Finalists ==
- 2022 Maria Makrides, South Australian Health and Medical Research Institute (SAHMRI) and Niki Sperou, Centre for Marine Bioproducts Development (CMBD) at Flinders University

== See also ==
- List of general science and technology awards
- List of awards named after people
