= Charles Norman Watson-Munro =

Charles Norman Watson-Munro (1915–1991) was an Australian physicist who designed and built the first nuclear reactors in Australia, Canada and the United Kingdom. He was an fellow of the Institute of Physics, the Australian Institute of Physics and the Australian Academy of Science. He served as the chief scientist at the Australian Atomic Energy Commission and taught at the University of Sydney.
