= Jozef Gécz =

Dr Jozef Gécz AO FAA is a senior researcher at The University of Adelaide studying the various mutations of a small part of the X chromosome that lead to mental retardation.

Gécz was elected Fellow of the Australian Academy of Health and Medical Sciences (FAHMS) in 2015 and Fellow of the Australian Academy of Science in 2017. He was named SA Scientist of the Year for 2019.

He was appointed an Officer of the Order of Australia in the 2026 King's Birthday Honours in recognition of "distinguished service to human translational genetic science, to genomic research, to child health, and to neurodevelopmental disability".
