= Bill Wittrick =

British engineer and academic

William Henry Wittrick FAA FRS (1922–1986) was a British engineer and academic who spent 20 years in Australia, including 10 years as Professor of Aeronautical Engineering at the University of Sydney (1956–1964). He was Professor of Structural Engineering at the University of Birmingham (1964–69), and Beale Professor of Civil Engineering, University of Birmingham (1969–82).

Wittrick was born on 29 October 1922 in Huddersfield, Yorkshire, went to high school at Huddersfield College (1933–1940), and was awarded scholarships which allowed him to attend the University of Cambridge (BA 1943, MA 1947). In 1950 he received the first PhD awarded by the University of Sydney, titled 'Torsion and bending of swept and tapered wings with ribs parallel to the root', and he was awarded Sc.D. by the University of Cambridge in 1969.

During the war Wittrick briefly worked at the Hawker Aircraft Company (1942), then at Cambridge teaching Royal Engineer Officer Cadets (1942–1944), and later as a Scientific Officer at the Royal Aircraft Establishment, Farnborough (1944–1945). In June 1945 he married Joyce, and aged 23 he accepted a position as a senior lecturer at the Department of Aeronautics of the University of Sydney (1945–1954). He was Reader (1954–1956), and appointed Lawrence Hargrave Professor of Aeronautical Engineering (1956–1964). In 1958 he was elected a Fellow of the Australian Academy of Science (FAA).

In 1964 Wittrick accepted the position of chair of Structural Engineering at the University of Birmingham (1964–1969), and subsequently Beale Professor of Civil Engineering, University of Birmingham (1969–1982). In 1980 he was elected a Fellow of the Royal Society (FRS).

He retired in 1982 due to ill-health, aged 60, and was appointed Emeritus Professor. He died on 2 July 1986 (aged 63) in Birmingham, England.
