= Ros Gleadow =

Australian plant scientist

Ros Gleadow FAA
- Born: Roslyn Margaret Hare; 1955 (age 70–71)
- Education: University of Melbourne
- Employer: Monash University
- Known for: Plant biology
- Title: Professor
- Website: https://lens.monash.edu/@gleadow

Roslyn M. Gleadow FAA (born Roslyn Hare 1955) is an Australian plant scientist, who leads the Plant Ecophysiological and Cyanogenesis Groups at Monash University, and was elected a Fellow of the Australian Academy of Science in 2024. Gleadow is Emerita Professor in the School of Biological Sciences at Monash University. She is also Honorary Professor The Queensland Alliance for Agriculture and Food Innovation University of Queensland and a Visiting Fellow, Institute for Climate, Energy & Disaster Solutions Australian National University.

== Education ==
Gleadow graduated from the University of Melbourne with a Bachelor of Science (Hons), and then a Master of Science in Ecophysiology, and finally PhD.

In high school, Gleadow was interested in "everything to do with biology". She thought she might become a medical doctor, but decided science was more fun.

== Career ==
Gleadow is a plant biologist and ecophysiologist who studies impacts of climate change on food security, focusing on plants which contain and produce cyanide as a defence against herbivores. Her research crosses molecular to ecosystem levels and global scales.

Gleadow has been President of the Global Plant Council, Deputy Director of the Monash Agtech LaunchPad, Chair of Eucalypt Australia and inaugural Chair of the International Working Group for Safe Cassava. She was also a member of the policy committee for the Royal Society of Victoria. Gleadow is a member of the advisory board for the Agricultural Biotechnology Council of Australia. She is a former member of the Australian Academy of Science's Committee for Agriculture, Fisheries and Food and the Australian Plant Phenomics Facility. Gleadow was President of the Australian Society of Plant Sciences from 2010-1012.

During her postdocotoral fellowship at the University of Melbourne, Gleadow produced field selections of elite forms of blue mallee (Eucalyptus polybractea) with leaves containing > 6% dry weight of eucalyptus oil. These trees are now in commercial production. In a novel application, she showed that eucalyptus oil high in 1,8-cineole kills the malarial parasite Plasmodium falciparum at concentrations commensurate with other drugs.

For her Masters of Science in Ecology, Gleadow determined that the introduction of European blackbirds coupled with changes in fire management practices facilitated the invasion by Pittosporum undulatum into Australian forests. The changes are perpetuated by microclimate changes, drought tolerance and allelopathy. This led to the widely adopted use of fire to control this and other bird distributed environmental weeds.

In 2018 she and journalist Clarissa Collis won the Crawford Fund Food Security Journalism Award.

== Publications ==
Gleadow has over 6000 citations and an H number of 42, according to Google Scholar as at May 2024. Select publications include:

- RM Gleadow, BL Møller, (2014) Cyanogenic glycosides: synthesis, physiology, and phenotypic plasticity. Annual Review of Plant Biology 65, 155–185.
- RM Gleadow, IE Woodrow (2002) Constraints on effectiveness of cyanogenic glycosides in herbivore defense. Journal of chemical ecology 28 (7), 1301–1313.

== Science communications ==
Gleadow was the co-ordinator of Monash University's science communication program. She commented on the Science communications program.

"At Monash, all our undergraduate science students take a subject in scientific practice and communication where they learn how to critically evaluate scientific information – and how to repackage it for different sorts of audiences."

== Awards ==
- 2024 – Fellow of the Australian Academy of Science.
- 2021 – Faculty of Science Award for Postgraduate Research supervision.
- 2019 – JG Wood Award and Memorial Lecture, Australian Society Plant Scientists.
- 2016 – Monash Postgraduate Association Supervisor of the Year, finalist.
- 2015 – Faculty of Science Award for Research Impact (Economic and Social).
- 2014 – Vice Chancellor’s Award for Excellence in Honours Supervision.
