= John Barton Furness =

Australian neuroscientist and physiologist

John Barton Furness is an Australian neuroscientist and physiologist known for his research on the enteric nervous system (ENS), the network of intrinsic neurons that control functions of the gastrointestinal tract, the chemical coding hypothesis, and digestive physiology. He is also known for his investigation of the evolution of digestive processes and of the ENS. He is Professor in Anatomy and Physiology at the University of Melbourne and Senior Principal Research Fellow at the Florey Institute of Neuroscience and Mental Health.

Furness was elected as a Fellow of the Australian Academy of Science in 1989, the Australian Government's Centenary Medal in 2003, Fellowship of the American Gastroenterological Association in 2008, and Fellowship of the Australian Academy of Health and Medical Sciences in 2017. In 2024, he was appointed an Officer of the Order of Australia (AO).

Furness has published more than 500 peer-reviewed articles and book chapters and is listed among the top 100 biomedical scientists in Australia. He is the world's most cited author in the field of the ENS. His 2006 monograph, The Enteric Nervous System, is a standard reference in the field.

== Early life and education ==
Furness, born in Brisbane, Australia (14 September 1945), is the eldest son of Kenneth Colston and Mary McCallum Furness (née Hayne). He is married to Lynne (née Sharp), with whom he has two children, Sebastian, also a research scientist, and Charlotte. He completed a Bachelor of Science in Physics and Mathematics at the University of Melbourne in 1966, before being invited, because of his skills in physics, to join the electrophysiology unit directed by Professor Geoff Burnstock in Zoology at Melbourne. He completed Honours in Zoology in 1967, and a PhD in 1971, both under the supervision of Professor Burnstock, focused on studies of autonomic control at a cellular level, including innervation of the gastrointestinal tract, establishing the direction of his subsequent research career.

== Career ==
After completing his PhD, Furness undertook postdoctoral research at the University of Birmingham (1971–1972) and at the Agricultural Research Council Institute of Animal Physiology in Cambridge (1972–1973) under the direction of Richard Keynes, FRS. He held a Fulbright Fellowship at the National Institutes of Health in Bethesda, Maryland, from 1979 to 1980.

=== Flinders University (1975–1990) ===
Furness joined Flinders University in 1975 as a Lecturer in Human Morphology, was promoted to Senior Lecturer in 1977, Associate Professor in 1981, and Professor of Anatomy and Histology in 1984, a position he held until 1990.^{]} During this period he collaborated extensively with Professor Marcello Costa, AO, FAA producing foundational work on the organisation and functions of the enteric nervous system. Furness and Costa published 157 original research papers and reviews together.

=== University of Melbourne (1990–present) ===
In 1990, Furness was invited to the University of Melbourne as Professor of Physiology. He subsequently served as Professor and Chairman of the Department of Anatomy and Cell Biology (1993–1996, 1999), Inaugural Director of the Centre for Neuroscience (1999–2000), and Associate Dean (Research) of the Faculty of Medicine, Dentistry and Health Sciences (1998–1999). He has also been a Senior Principal Research Fellow at the Florey Institute of Neuroscience and Mental Health since 2015.

=== Societies ===
He was a founder of the Australasian Neuroscience Society, where he is an Honorary Life Member (2007), and of the International Society for Autonomic Neuroscience. Since 2023, Furness has served as President of the Australasian Society for Autonomic Neuroscience. He is an Honorary Life Member of the Physiological Society (UK) and a member of the Americal Physiological Society. In 2005 he was appointed a Fellow of the Academy of Science of Bologna (L'accademia delle scienze dell'istituto di Bologna). The academy was founded in 1690, and is the second oldest extant academy in Europe (the Royal Society of London being the oldest). He was awarded the Gold Medal of the Society in 2008.

== Research ==
=== Enteric nervous system circuitry ===
Furness's most sustained contribution has been to the understanding of the intrinsic neural circuitry of the gastrointestinal tract. Beginning in the 1970s in collaboration with Marcello Costa, he applied multiple techniques, including microsurgical lesioning, axonal tracing, multi-label immunohistochemistry, electron microscopy, intracellular electrophysiology and pharmacological analysis to map the enteric neural circuits in detail. The circuit reconstructions that arose from this work have entered physiology textbooks and become broadly accepted as applicable to mammals in general, including humans.

=== Intrinsic primary afferent neurons ===
For many years there was controversy concerning whether the gastrointestinal tract contained sensory neurons (IPANs). Furness definitively identified and characterized IPANs in terms of their structures, roles in enteric reflexes and cell physiological properties. IPANS initiate local reflex responses independent of the central nervous system. Furness's characterisation resolved the controversy concerning their existence and identities.

=== Chemical coding of neurons ===
Furness and colleagues demonstrated that subpopulations of autonomic neurons can be distinguished by their unique combinations of neuropeptides and other chemical markers, a framework termed the chemical coding hypothesis.

=== Ghrelin receptors and roles in the central nervous system ===
Furness discovered that neurons of the spinal defecation centres express ghrelin receptors and are stimulated by ghrelin receptor agonists. He also discovered that, surprisingly, ghrelin is not present within the central nervous system, a finding that has since been independently confirmed. This led to the initiation of a clinical trial of a ghrelin receptor agonist for constipation in spinal cord injury, which reported evidence of safety and efficacy. In further studies, Furness and colleagues showed that the ghrelin receptor's constitutive activity can reverse the cellular output of the dopamine D2 receptor in neurons where the two receptors are co-expressed.

=== Vagal neuromodulation for inflammatory bowel disease ===
Furness and collaborators demonstrated that vagus nerve stimulation reduces intestinal inflammation in experimental models, acting through a reflex involving vagal afferent and sympathetic efferent pathways. A clinical trial has been approved and is currently underway. The broader scientific case for bioelectronic approaches to gastrointestinal disorders has been reviewed by Furness and colleagues in Nature Reviews Gastroenterology & Hepatology.

== Honours and awards ==
Year	Award
1979–1980	Fulbright Fellowship, National Institutes of Health
1989	Fellow of the Australian Academy of Science (FAA)
2005	Fellowship, Accademia delle Scienze dell'Istituto di Bologna
2008	Gold Medal, Accademia delle Scienze dell'Istituto di Bologna.
2017	Fellow of the Australian Academy of Health and Medical Sciences (FAHMS)
2024	Officer of the Order of Australia (AO), for distinguished service to medical research in the field of autonomic neuroscience and neurogastroenterology.

== Selected publications ==
=== Books ===
- Furness, J.B. (2006). The Enteric Nervous System. Blackwell Publishing, Oxford.doi:10.1002/9780470988756

=== Peer-reviewed articles ===
- Furness, J.B. (1969). "An electrophysiological study of the innervation of the smooth muscle of the colon." J. Physiol. (Lond.) 205: 549–562. doi:10.1113/jphysiol.1969.sp008982
- Furness, J.B.; Costa, M. (1980). "Types of nerves in the enteric nervous system." Neuroscience. 5: 1–20.doi:10.1016/0306-4522(80)90067-6
- Furness, J.B.; Morris, J.L.; Gibbins, I.L.; Costa, M. (1989). "Chemical coding of neurons and plurichemical transmission." Ann. Rev. Pharmacol. Toxicol. 29: 289–306.doi:10.1146/annurev.pa.29.040189.001445
- Furness, J.B. (2012). "The enteric nervous system and neurogastroenterology." Nature Reviews Gastroenterology & Hepatology. 9: 286–294. doi:10.1038/nrgastro.2012.32
- Furness, J.B.; Rivera, L.R.; Cho, H-J.; Bravo, D.M.; Callaghan, B. (2013). "The gut as a sensory organ." Nature Reviews Gastroenterology & Hepatology. 10: 729–740.doi:10.1038/nrgastro.2013.180
- Furness, J.B.; Bravo, D.M. (2015). "Humans as cucinivores: comparisons with other species." J Comp Physiol B 185: 825–834.doi:10.1007/s00360-015-0919-3
- Payne, S.C.; Furness, J.B.; Stebbing, M.J. (2019). "Bioelectric neuromodulation for gastrointestinal disorders: effectiveness and mechanisms." Nature Reviews Gastroenterology & Hepatology 16: 89–105. doi:10.1038/s41575-018-0078-6
- Furness, J.B. (2022). "Comparative and evolutionary aspects of the digestive system and its enteric nervous system control." Adv Exp Biol Med 383: 165–177. doi:10.1007/978-3-031-05843-1_16
- Furness, J.B.; Marklund, U.; Czapla, B.J.; Bornstein, J.C.; Han, M.N. (2026). "Functional characterization and classification of enteric neurons, and regional differences in neural control of digestive functions." Autonomic Neuroscience 265: 103412.doi:10.1016/j.autneu.2026.103412
