= David Kemp (parasitologist) =

Australian plant geneticist and parasitologist (1945–2013)

David Kemp OAM FAA
- Born: David James Kemp; 23 July 1945
- Died: 22 November 2013 (aged 68)
- Education: University of Adelaide
- Scientific career
- Fields: plant geneticics parasitology
- Workplaces: Walter and Eliza Hall Institute of Medical Research
- Academic advisors: David Hogness
- Doctoral students: Alan Cowman

David James Kemp (23 July 1945 – 22 November 2013) was an Australian plant geneticist and parasitologist.

He spent most of his career at the Walter and Eliza Hall Institute of Medical Research (WEHI) conducting genetic research into the parasite that causes malaria, rising to become the head of the Immunoparasitology Unit at WEHI. In 2008, his services to medical research were recognized with the award of the Medal of the Order of Australia.

== Early life and education ==
Kemp was born in Adelaide on 23 July 1945 to Albert and Marjorie Kemp. He had an older brother, Robert. His father, Albert, was a toolmaker in the engine department of the car maker General Motors Holden. During World War II, Albert had worked on the development of an Australian version of the Spitfire aeroplane.

The family lived in the suburb of Woodville, which was then undeveloped and his house was set among paddocks. He attended Woodville Primary School and went on to Woodville High School. In his youth, his interest in science was inspired by watching the Sputnik satellite pass over, and by the Moon landing in 1969. He joined the geology club, and enjoyed many field trips to the Flinders Ranges and Cambrian Period fossil fields. He matriculated from high school in 1962 with the highest score in the State, which earned him a £200 prize, which he used to buy a double bass to feed his jazz obsession.

After matriculation, Kemp initially attended Teacher's College, funded by a South Australian Department of Education grant, but this did not suit him and he switched to studying science at the University of Adelaide. He graduated with a B.Sc. (First Class Honours) in 1969, followed by a PhD in biochemistry in 1973. His doctoral research into the way avian feather keratin genes are organized won him the William Culross Prize for the best thesis in any field at the university that year. After completing his doctorate, he continued his research at the University of Adelaide for a year, which led to his feature article in the prestigious journal Nature as the sole author.

== Career ==
In 1975, Kemp took a post-doctoral research position at the CSIRO Division of Plant Industry where he built his knowledge of molecular biology while he investigated Drosophila. In 1976 he was awarded an Eleanor Roosevelt Fellowship and he moved to America at Stanford University for further study into recombinant DNA. While there, he and his colleagues George Stark and Jim Alwine developed the Northern blot technique for detecting specific RNAs on gel blots. His paper in the Proceedings of the National Academy of Sciences (USA) which announced this technique went on to be the highest-cited paper of his career, with 1,889 citations as at 2014.

In 1978 Kemp returned to Australia and he joined the Walter and Eliza Hall Institute of Medical Research (WEHI), working on immunoglobulin genes. He supervised PhD candidate Alan Cowman and together they developed improved techniques to detect antigens expressed in E. coli. In 1981 he became a senior researcher, looking into how to clone malaria antigens with the goal of making a vaccine. In 1984 he was appointed the head of the MacArthur Laboratory of Molecular Parasitology at WEHI. In 1986 he became a principal research fellow, then from 1990 to 1992 a senior principal research fellow and head of the Immunoparasitology Unit.

The research focus was on protozoan infections, especially the cause of malaria (Plasmodium falciparum), which kill over 500,000 people each year world-wide. By 1992 he had built a group of 60 people, most of whom were using cloning techniques to work on malaria. Some critics have commented that the WEHI group struggled to come to grips with the financial necessities of commercialising their research and funding "big science" projects. However, their technical achievements were universally acknowledged. An important discovery was the malaria antigen gene "apical memberane antigen 1" (AMA-1), which has potential for use in developing a malaria vaccine. In 1984, Kemp's team pioneered the use of pulse field gel electrophoresis to separate malaria chromosomes, which allowed them to understand the arrangement and structure of its genome.

Following WEHI in 1992, he studied aboriginal health issues in Darwin for several years as deputy director of the Menzies School of Health. Then in 2000 me moved to the Queensland Institute of Medical Research as laboratory head of the malaria and arbovirus unit, researching the molecular biology of malaria parasites and scabies mites.

Kemp was elected as a Fellow to the Australian Academy of Science in 1996, and he served in several capacities. He was a member of the Sectional Committee for molecular and cell biology in 1992 and again from 1998 to 2002, and he served on the council from 2002 to 2006.

Kemp's scientific output was prolific and influential: he published 225 peer-reviewed research articles, reviews and book chapters. As of April 2014, his work has been cited more than 13,300 times, and thirty of his publications had been cited over one hundred times each. He had a Hirsh h-index of 57.

== Recognition ==
- 1981 Boehringer-Mannheim Medal of the Australian Biochemical Society
- 1992 Wellcome Prize for diagnostics
- 1992 Howard Hughes Medical Institute International Research Scholar
- 1996 Elected Fellow of the Australian Academy of Science
- 2001 Centenary Medal
- 2008 Medal of the Order of Australia

== Personal life ==
On the night of his twenty-first birthday, Kemp was introduced to a nursing student named Katherine Mary Wakefield, and the couple were soon married. Katherine completed her training in Adelaide and later specialized in midwifery and intensive care.

He loved music, and played double bass at jazz clubs through his time at university. He played with the Channel 7 orchestra and the three Gibb brothers before they became the Bee Gees. Later, he formed bands at many of his work places.

On retirement in 2006, the Kemps moved to Tallangatta, Victoria. When Kemp died in 2013, he was survived by sons Andrew, Ben and Daniel and grandchildren Rachael, Jessica and Ryan.
