= Marilyn Ball =

Australian scientist

Marilyn Ball FAA is a professor at the College of Medicine, Biology and Environment at the Australian National University (ANU), and leader of the Ball (Marilyn) Lab for Ecophysiology of Salinity and Freezing Tolerance.

Ball gained her PhD in environmental biology from the ANU in 1982. She held postdoctoral positions at the University of California, Berkeley from 1981 to 1984 and at the ANU's North Australia Research Unit in Darwin from 1985 to 1988. In 1989, Ball was awarded a National Research Fellowship from the Australian Research Council. In 1990, Ball was appointed to a tenured position in biology at the ANU and since then has led an eco-physiological research group there. She is a member of the Australian Antarctic Research Advisory Committee and serves on the Editorial Boards of the international journals: Ecosystems, Global Change Biology, Oecologia, Plant, Cell & Environment, and Tree Physiology.

== Areas of expertise ==
- Global Change Biology
- Plant Physiology
- Ecological Physiology
- Cell Metabolism

== Awards ==
=== 2009 ===
Fellow of the Australian Academy of Science, awarded by the Australian Academy of Science

Joint College Award for Excellence in Education, awarded by the ANU College of Medicine, Biology & Environment and the ANU College of Physical & Mathematical Sciences

=== 2007 ===
Lifetime Honorary Member Award from the Ecological Society of America

== Ball (Marilyn) Lab for Ecophysiology of Salinity and Freezing Tolerance ==
Ball's laboratory investigates how plant communities respond to changed environmental conditions, in terms of their physiology. In particular they explore the relationships between stress tolerance and photosynthesis, and the consequences for plants' ability to absorb carbon dioxide from the atmosphere and hence help to remediate climate change. Case studies involve mangroves, temperate evergreen sclerophyll species, and Antarctic vegetation.

== Projects ==
=== Student projects ===
- Ecophysiology of salinity and temperature tolerance in a changing world (Honours, Higher degree by research)

=== Other projects ===
- Climate change and carbon gain in Antarctic mosses
- Coping with temperature extremes: morphological constraints on leaf function in a warmer, drier climate
- Salinity tolerance along an aridity gradient: linking physiological processes with morphological constraints on leaf function in mangroves

== Publications ==
- Publications Authored by Marilyn C Ball
