= Robert Morton (biochemist) =

Australian biochemist

Professor Robert Kerford Morton FAA (7 August 1920 – 27 September 1963) was an Australian biochemist. He was associate professor of biochemistry at the University of Melbourne from 1952 to 1958, and Professor of Agricultural Chemistry at the University of Adelaide's Waite Agricultural Research Institute from 1959 to 1962. In 1963 he became Professor of Biochemistry at Adelaide, but died that year as the result of an accident in his laboratory.

== Career ==
Morton was born on 7 August 1920 in Cootamundra, New South Wales. His family settled in Sydney where Morton attended Sydney Boys High School. From 1936 to 1938 he attended Hawkesbury Agricultural College where he earned a Diploma in Dairy Technology before attending the University of Sydney. His studies were interrupted by the war where he served as a Lieutenant in Royal Australian Navy and Royal Navy. After the war he returned to Sydney where he graduated with First Class Honours in 1948. Awarded the first Gowrie Travelling Scholarship, he married Jessie Noelle Telfer and they proceeded to the University of Cambridge where in 1952 he was awarded a Ph.D.

In 1952 he returned to a Senior Lecturer position at the University of Melbourne where he was rapidly promoted to reader and associate professor. While at Melbourne he became friends with the head of the biochemistry department, Professor Victor Trikojus. In 1957 he was elected a Fellow of the Australian Academy of Science. In 1959 he took the position of Professor of Agricultural Chemistry at the University of Adelaide's Waite Agricultural Research Institute. In 1962 he took a sabbatical, and in 1963 he returned to Adelaide to take up the chair of Biochemistry.

Morton died in Adelaide on 27 September 1963, at age 44, when a large quantity of acetone he was using in his laboratory exploded.
