= Charles Barry Osmond =

Australian plant biologist

Charles Barry Osmond FAA FRS
- Born: 20 September 1939 (age 85); Cooranbong, New South Wales, Australia
- Occupation: Plant biologist

Charles Barry Osmond FAA FRS (born 20 September 1939) is an Australian plant biologist.

Barry Osmond was born in Cooranbong, New South Wales in 1939. He studied at the University of New England, earning a BSc(Hons) in 1961 and MSc in 1963, followed by a PhD from the University of Adelaide in 1965. In 1967 he joined the Australian National University as a Postdoctoral Research Fellow. He was Professor of Environmental Biology 1978–1987, Director, Research School of Biological Sciences 1991-1998 and Professor, Photo Bioenergetics Group 1998–2001.

== Awards ==
- Goldacre Medal, Australian Society of Plant Physiologists 1972
- Edgeworth David Medal, Royal Society of New South Wales 1973
- Fellow of the Australian Academy of Science 1978
- Fellow of the Royal Society 1984
- Distinguished Alumni award, University of New England 1994
- Clarke Medal (Botany), Royal Society of New South Wales 1997
- Humboldt Research Award, (Forschungspreis), Alexander von Humboldt Foundation 1997

Awards
Preceded by Klaus Rohde	Clarke Medal; 1997	Succeeded by Richard Limon Stanton
