= Robert Norman (Australian professor) =

Reproductive medicine professor

Robert John Norman is an Australian clinician researcher. His major research contributions have been in reproductive medicine, fertility, assisted reproduction technology and polyendocrine metabolic ovarian syndrome (PMOS).

He was appointed an Officer of the Order of Australia in the Queen's Birthday Honours 2013.

== Affiliations and education ==
Norman is Emeritus Professor for Reproductive and Periconceptual Medicine at the University of Adelaide. In 2015 he became a Fellow of the Australian Academy of Health and Medical Sciences.

== Research and impact ==
In 2024 Norman led The Australian Evidence-based Guideline for unexplained infertility: ADAPTE process from the ESHRE Evidence-based Guideline on unexplained infertility 2024.

== Roles ==
In 2008, Norman founded the Robinson Research Institute at the University of Adelaide. He was the Director from 2008 to 2013, and it had 60 Reproductive Health Research Leaders and over 450 staff.

He is a former medical director at the IVF service Fertility SA and Repromed Fertility Specialists. He has served as a member of the NHMRC Research Committee and the Embryo Lincensing Committee.

He was President of the Asia Pacific Initiative for Reproduction Society, Scientific Chair of ASPIRE (2014 and 2016) and is the past Scientific Chair of the Fertility Society of Australia and New Zealand (FSANZ) and an Honorary Life Member.

== Recognition ==
- 2018 - ASPIRE (Asia Pacific Initiative on Reproduction) Lifetime Achievement Award
- 2017 - Life membership of ESHRE (European Society of Human Reproduction and Embryology)
- 2015 - First recipient of the Ricardo Azziz Distinguished Researcher Award from the AE PCOS Society (now known as the AE PMOS Society)
- 2015 - Fellow of the Australian Academy of Health and Medical Sciences (AAHMS)
- 2014 - Life Membership of the Society for Reproductive Biology (SRB)
- 2013 - Order of Australia (AO)
- 2013 - American Society of Reproductive Medicine Distinguished Research Leader Award
- 2009 - SA Scientist of the Year for contribution to Health in South Australia

== Scientific publications ==
Norman has published in journals including:

- Fertility and Sterility
- Medical Journal of Australia
- The Lancet
- Human Reproduction
