= Jack Roderick =

Jack Roderick may refer to:

- Jack Roderick (civil engineer)
- Jack Roderick (politician)

== See also ==
- John Roderick (disambiguation)
