= Rana Ellen Munns =

- Born: Sydney, Australia
- Education: BSc 1966 Biochemistry Department, University of Sydney Doctor of Philosophy 1972, CSIRO Plant Physiology Unit, University of Sydney. Research Fellow, 1977-1980, Department of Agronomy, University of Western Australia
- Occupation(s): Botanist, plant scientist

Rana Ellen Munns FAA is an Australian botanist whose primary research has been to determine the traits that underpin salinity tolerance and adaptation to drought in crop plants. Rana was born in Sydney Australia and attended the University of Sydney, receiving her undergraduate degree in Biochemistry in 1966. She completed her Ph.D. in 1972 to begin a lifelong course of research on salt tolerance of plants first as a Research Fellow at the University of Western Australia and later at CSIRO Plant Industry in Canberra. In the early 1990s, she found that sodium exclusion was an important trait associated with the salt tolerance in wheat using a seedling stage assay. This work culminated in understanding wheat grain yield in saline soils in terms of genetic components that could be improved by an ancestral transporter gene. This research eventually led to a cultivar of wheat that yielded 25% more on saline soils that in farmers' fields and is used by over thirty wheat seed companies globally.

== Career ==
BSc (Hons 1st Class) 1966 Biochemistry Department, University of Sydney
Doctor of Philosophy 1972, CSIRO Plant Physiology Unit, University of Sydney. Chloroplast Development
1973–1976 Senior Tutor, Macquarie University, NSW
1977–1980 Research Fellow, Department of Agronomy, University of Western Australia
1981–2005 Research Scientist CSIRO Plant Industry, Canberra
2005–2010 Chief Research Scientist, CSIRO Division of Plant Industry, Canberra
2011–present Honorary Fellow, CSIRO Plant Industry, Canberra
2011–2013 Winthrop Research Professor, School of Plant Biology, University of Western Australia
2014–present Emeritus Professor, ARC Centre of Excellence in Plant Energy Biology, jointly with School of Plant Biology

Former Editor-in-chief of Functional Plant Biology

== Honours and awards ==
- 2006 Corresponding Member of American Society of Plant Biologists
- 2012 Thomson Reuters Australia Citation Award for most highly cited plant scientist during 2002–2012
