= Yuri Estrin =

Russian-Australian scientist

Yuri Estrin (Professor)
- Born: Soviet Union
- Education: Institute of Crystallography of the Academy of Sciences of the USSR
- Known for: expertise in physical metallurgy, materials modelling, and development of new materials
- Awards: Honorary Doctorate from the Russian Academy of Sciences
- Scientific career
- Fields: Materials Science and Engineering
- Workplaces: Monash University, CSIRO, Pohang University of Science and Technology (Adjunct Professor)

Yuri Estrin (professor), also written "Juri Estrin", is an international authority on materials science and engineering, particularly in the areas of physical metallurgy, materials modelling, and development of new materials. He is a fellow of the Australian Academy of Science and recipient of an honorary doctorate from the Russian Academy of Sciences in 2008. In 2015, he won a Thomson Reuters Australian Citation Award. Yuri Estrin was born and educated in the former Soviet Union, where he completed his university studies in Physics and Materials Engineering in Moscow with a high distinction.

He worked as a researcher at the Institute of Crystallography of the Academy of Sciences of the Soviet Union and received his PhD degree from that institution in 1975.

In 1977, he briefly visited Germany as an Alexander von Humboldt Fellow. After leaving the Soviet Union in the Leonid Brezhnev years, Estrin migrated to Germany and ultimately moved to Hamburg in 1981 with his wife, Karin Estrin.

In Hamburg, at the newly established University of Technology (TUHH), he received his habilitation and became professor of physical metallurgy. His son Daniel Estrin, was also born in Hamburg.

Estrin and his family migrated to Western Australia in 1992, where he became professor in the Department of Mechanical and Materials Engineering at the University of Western Australia.

Since then, Estrin has held the chair in Physical Metallurgy at Clausthal University of Technology in Germany and joined the Department of Materials Engineering at Monash University in Melbourne as Professor and later Director of the Centre for Advanced Hybrid Materials. He is currently an Honorary Professorial Fellow in this department.

Yuri Estrin has received international recognition for his scientific achievements, including Humboldt Awards (1999 and 2012), a Staudinger-Durrer Lecture at the Swiss Federal University of Technology (2011), a World-Class University professorship at Seoul National University (2009-2013), and a Helmholtz International Fellow Award from the Helmholtz Association of German Research Centres. Estrin is also an adjunct professor at the Pohang University of Science and Technology (Korea) and Nanjing University of Science and Technology (China). In 2013, he won a grant of the Russian government under the so-called 'megagrant' scheme to establish research activities in hybrid nanostructured materials at Moscow Institute of Steel and Alloys. He was awarded an Honorary Doctorate from the Russian Academy of Sciences (2008) and was elected fellow of the Australian Academy of Science (2013).

Estrin is the author of more than 500 publications focussing on nanomaterials including nanomechanics, light alloys, alloy design, thin films, hybrid materials and multimaterials as well as design of novel materials based on geometry principles.

Estrin's daughter, Prof. Masha Niv, is an academic working in the area of bioinformatics.
