= Richard Limon Stanton =

Richard Limon Stanton AO FAA
- Born: 16 February 1926; Sydney, New South Wales, Australia
- Died: 25 August 2020 (aged 94); Canberra, Australia
- Occupation: Geologist

Richard Limon (Dick) Stanton AO FAA (16 February 1926 – 25 August 2020) was an Australian geologist.

Stanton was Professor of Geology at the University of New England in New South Wales from 1975 to 1986. He was appointed a Fellow of the Australian Academy of Science (FAA) in 1975.

== Awards ==
- David Syme Research Prize, University of Melbourne 1972
- Fellow of the Australian Academy of Science 1975
- Penrose Gold Medal, Society of Economic Geologists 1993
- Officer of the Order of Australia (AO) for service to economic geology and geological research 1996
- Clarke Medal (Geology), Royal Society of New South Wales 1998
- Centenary Medal for service to Australian society and science in geology and geochemistry 2001

Awards
Preceded by Charles Barry Osmond	Clarke Medal; 1998	Succeeded by Richard Shine
