= Bob Bilger =

South African-born Australian engineer

- Born: Robert William Bilger; 22 April 1935; Rustenburg, South Africa
- Died: 2 October 2015 (aged 80)
- Occupations: Engineer, Combustion Scientist

Robert William Bilger FAA (22 April 1935 – 2 October 2015) was a South African born Australian engineer.

Born in Rustenburg, South Africa, on 22 April 1935, Bilger studied both a Bachelor of Engineering in Mechanical Engineering and a Bachelor of Science in Mathematics at Auckland University College in New Zealand.

He was awarded a Rhodes Scholarship in 1956 and, in 1961, received a Doctor of Philosophy in Engineering Science from Exeter College, University of Oxford, submitting a dissertation titled "The Behaviour of pitot and static holes in fluid flow" completed under the supervision of Professor A. Thom. In 1965 he joined the University of Sydney as a senior lecturer in mechanical engineering before becoming a professor in 1976, where he remained until his retirement in 2006.

He was awarded the status of Fellow in the American Physical Society, after being nominated by the Division of Fluid Dynamics in 2002, for "outstanding contributions to knowledge of turbulent reactive flows through insightful experiments, theory and modelling, especially for elucidating the fundamental processes in turbulent combustion and for the development of the conditional moment closure."

Bilger was made a Fellow of the Australian Academy of Technology and Engineering in 1987, and later elected as a Fellow of the Australian Academy of Science in 2003. For outstanding contributions to combustion science, he was awarded the Ya. B. Zeldovich Gold Medal by The Combustion Institute in 1992. Due to the impact of his research and his involvement in the organisation of combustion conferences, the primary keynote lecture during the biannual Australian Combustion Symposium is known as the "Bilger Lecture".
