= Brian Lawn (scientist) =

Materials scientist

- Lawn in 2004
- Education: University of Western Australia (BSc, PhD)
- Scientific career
- Fields: Materials science
- Workplaces: University of New South Wales National Institute of Standards and Technology

Brian R. Lawn is an Australian-American materials scientist whose research covers physical and engineering disciplines, including the mechanical behavior of intrinsically brittle solids, including glasses, ceramics, composite and multilayer structures, biomaterials, teeth. He has worked on indentation micromechanics, using contact probes to explore and characterize material properties.

== Awards ==
Lawn is a member of the U.S. National Academy of Engineering (2001) and a corresponding fellow of the Australian Academy of Science (2012). He was awarded an honorary doctorate in engineering from the University of Western Australia (2008). He is Honorary Fellow of the International Conference on Fracture (2005) and Academician of the World Academy of Ceramics (2011).

He has been an active member of the American Ceramic Society, and served as Editorial Chairman for their flagship journal (JACerS) (1984–86). He is Fellow (1986) and Distinguished Life Member (2012) of that society.
