= John G. Oakeshott =

Australian biologist and geneticist

- John G. Oakeshott Oakeshott in 2010

John Graham Oakeshott is an Australian evolutionary biologist and molecular geneticist known for his work on molecular adaptation, insecticide resistance, Drosophila genetics, insect genomics and enzyme-based bioremediation. Oakeshott served as a Chief Scientist in the Division of Entomology of the Commonwealth Scientific and Industrial Research Organisation (CSIRO), Australia.

Oakeshott was elected a Fellow of the Australian Academy of Technological Sciences and Engineering (FTSE) in 2006 and a Fellow of the Australian Academy of Science (FAA) in 2010.

== Education and career ==
Oakeshott received his PhD in genetics from the University of Adelaide in 1979 for his thesis, Relations between environmental and genetic variation in Drosophila melanogaster.

He led CSIRO Entomology's biotechnology programs, overseeing advances in enzyme technologies for pesticide and toxin bioremediation, along with gene and diagnostic technologies, and biopesticides.

Oakeshott also served on Australian federal committees for gene-technology regulatory committees, serving for nearly two decades during the introduction of transgenic cotton in Australia.

== Research ==
=== Evolutionary genetics and molecular adaptation ===
Oakeshott researched the genetic and biochemical mechanisms of evolutionary adaption. His early work on geographic variation in Drosophila melanogaster enzyme polymorphisms advanced understanding the molecular basis of adaptation.

=== Insecticide resistance ===
Oakeshott has elucidated the molecular mecahnism of insecticide resistance in Australian sheep blowfly, Lucilia cuprina. He studied how changes in insect esterases can alter enzyme function and confer resistance to organophosphorus insecticides. In 1997, Oakeshott and colleagues reported in the Proceedings of the National Academy of Sciences of the United States of America that a single amino-acid substitution in a carboxylesterase could convert the enzyme into an organophosphorus hydrolase and confer insecticide resistance in blowfly.

=== Biotechnology and bioremediation ===
Oakeshott's research on microbial and enzymatic degradation of pesticides and other synthetic chemicals, linked enzyme function and evolution with applications in environmental biotechnology.

At CSIRO Entomology, Oakeshott was a key contributor to the development of Landguard, an enzyme-based technology created in collaboration with Orica Watercare to treat organophosphate pesticide residues from contaminated waters. In 2006, Landguard received a DuPont Innovation Award in the Food, Agricultural Production and Marketing category. In 2007, Orica Watercare's Remediation business received the Technology and Innovation Award at the Agribusiness Awards for Excellence for the Landguard^{TM} technology.

=== Insect genomics ===
Oakeshott has also contributed to comparative genomics of major agriculturally pests. In 2017, he co-authored a study comparing the genomes of the cotton ballworm (Helicoverpa armigera) and the corn ballworm (Helicoverpa zea) identifying genomic features linked to their broad host ranges, adaptability, and the capacity to evolve pesticide resistance.

== Honours and recognition ==
Oakeshott was elected a Fellow of the Australian Academy of Technological Sciences and Engineering in 2006 for his contributions to biotechnology, including enzyme technologies for bioremediation, gene and enzyme technologies, diagnostic technologies and biopesticides.

Oakeshott was elected a Fellow of the Australian Academy of Science fin 2010 or his work on Drosophila enzyme polymorphisms, insecticide resistance in blowflies, bacterial degradation of persistent organic pollutants, gene-technology regulation and enzyme-based pesticide bioremediation.
