= Brajesh K. Singh =

Indian-Australian soil scientist

Prof. Brajesh K. Singh FAA, FSSSA, FRSB, F(AAM)
- Occupations: Ecologist; soil biologist; soil scientist; researcher; academic
- Years active: 2003–present
- Known for: his work and contributions on terrestrial life, rhizospheres and soil microbiomes.
- Title: Distinguished Professor
- Board member of: President of the Global Initiative of Sustainable Agriculture and Environment
- Awards: The Dorothy Jones Prize (2023), Humboldt Research Award (2019)

Academic background
- Education: PhD (University of London)
- Alma mater: Imperial College, London (2003)
- Thesis: Studies on interactions of some pesticides with soil microbial communities (2003)

Academic work
- Discipline: Soil science, functional ecology
- Sub-discipline: Soil biodiversity, agricultural soil science
- Institutions: Western Sydney University
- Main interests: soil and plant microbiomes, soil health, soil biodiversity, ecosystem functions, farm productivity, sustainable development, environmental protection and food security

Brajesh K. Singh FAA, FSSSA is an Indian-Australian soil scientist, ecologist, researcher and academic known for his work in functional ecology, microbiology, and soil biology. Singh is distinguished professor of soil biology at Western Sydney University (WSU)'s Hawkesbury Institute for the Environment, and was the director of the Global Centre for Land-Based Innovation until 2023 at WSU. Singh won the 2023 Dorothy Jones Prize for microbiology, and Alexander von Humboldt Research award in 2019. He is a Fellow of the Australian Academy of Science.

== Biography ==
Singh graduated with a PhD from Imperial College, London, in 2003. After working for about ten years in Scotland, working at the Macaulay Institute in Aberdeen from 2002 to 2010, Singh moved to WSU in 2010, where he worked at various positions until 2015, when he became the director of its the Global Centre for Land-Based Innovation. In 2022, he was awarded the Distinguished Professor title after being named a Clarivate Highly Cited (HiCi) Researcher since (2021–2023) and winning the JA Prescott Medal in 2021. Singh was a member of the European Commission High Level Expert Group (HLEG) and chaired the FAO's International Network of Soil Biodiversity and is President of the Global Initiative of Sustainable Agriculture and Environment.

== Select publications ==
- Singh BK, Delgado-Baquerizo M, Egidi E, Guirado E, Leach JE, Liu H, Trivedi, P (2023). Climate change impacts on plant pathogens, food security and paths forward. Nature Reviews Microbiology, 21, 640–656.
- Delgado-Baquerizo, Manuel, Fernando T. Maestre, Peter B. Reich, Thomas C. Jeffries, Juan J. Gaitan, Daniel Encinar, Miguel Berdugo, Colin D. Campbell, and Brajesh K. Singh. "Microbial diversity drives multifunctionality in terrestrial ecosystems." Nature communications 7, no. 1 (2016): 10541.
- Xiong, Chao, Yong-Guan Zhu, Jun-Tao Wang, Brajesh Singh, Li-Li Han, Ju-Pei Shen, Pei-Pei Li et al. "Host selection shapes crop microbiome assembly and network complexity." New Phytologist 229, no. 2 (2021): 1091–1104.
- Trivedi, Pankaj, Jan E. Leach, Susannah G. Tringe, Tongmin Sa, and Brajesh K. Singh. "Plant–microbiome interactions: from community assembly to plant health." Nature reviews microbiology 18, no. 11 (2020): 607–621.
- Cavicchioli, Ricardo, William J. Ripple, Kenneth N. Timmis, Farooq Azam, Lars R. Bakken, Matthew Baylis, Michael J. Behrenfeld et al. "Scientists’ warning to humanity: microorganisms and climate change." Nature Reviews Microbiology 17, no. 9 (2019): 569–586.
- Delgado-Baquerizo, Manuel, Angela M. Oliverio, Tess E. Brewer, Alberto Benavent-González, David J. Eldridge, Richard D. Bardgett, Fernando T. Maestre, Brajesh K. Singh, and Noah Fierer. "A global atlas of the dominant bacteria found in soil." Science 359, no. 6373 (2018): 320–325.
- Maestre, Fernando T., Manuel Delgado-Baquerizo, Thomas C. Jeffries, David J. Eldridge, Victoria Ochoa, Beatriz Gozalo, José Luis Quero et al. "Increasing aridity reduces soil microbial diversity and abundance in global drylands." Proceedings of the National Academy of Sciences 112, no. 51 (2015): 15684–15689.
- Karhu, Kristiina, Marc D. Auffret, Jennifer AJ Dungait, David W. Hopkins, James I. Prosser, Brajesh K. Singh, Jens-Arne Subke et al. "Temperature sensitivity of soil respiration rates enhanced by microbial community response." Nature 513, no. 7516 (2014): 81–84.
- Singh, Brajesh K., Richard D. Bardgett, Pete Smith, and Dave S. Reay. "Microorganisms and climate change: terrestrial feedbacks and mitigation options." Nature Reviews Microbiology 8, no. 11 (2010): 779–790.
- Singh, Brajesh K. "Organophosphorus-degrading bacteria: ecology and industrial applications." Nature Reviews Microbiology 7, no. 2 (2009): 156–164.
- Singh, Brajesh K., and Allan Walker. "Microbial degradation of organophosphorus compounds." FEMS microbiology reviews 30, no. 3 (2006): 428–471.

== The Dorothy Jones Prize ==
Singh won the 2023 Dorothy Jones Prize for microbiology for his research in microbial functional ecology, particularly focusing on soil microbial diversity and its impact on ecosystem functions under various natural and human-induced pressures.
