= Jennifer Flegg =

Australian mathematician

- Education: Queensland University of Technology
- Awards: JH Mitchell Medal (2020); Christopher Heyde Medal (2020)
- Scientific career
- Fields: Mathematics
- Workplaces: University of Melbourne
- Thesis: Mathematical Modelling of Chronic Wound Healing (2009)
- Doctoral advisor: Dr. Sean McElwain

Jennifer A. Flegg is an Australian mathematician and professor of applied mathematics in the School of Mathematics and Statistics at the University of Melbourne.

== Education and career ==
Flegg received her PhD in Applied Mathematics from Queensland University of Technology in 2009. Her dissertation, "Mathematical Modelling of Chronic Wound Healing", was supervised by Dr. Sean McElwain. From 2010 to 2013, she was a researcher at the University of Oxford developing mathematical models for the spread of resistance to antimalarial drugs. From 2014 to early 2017, she was a mathematical lecturer in the School of Mathematical Sciences at Monash University. In May 2017, she joined the School of Mathematics and Statistics at the University of Melbourne as a senior lecturer in Applied Mathematics and was promoted to associate professor in 2020 and again to Professor in 2022.

Flegg is an expert in the field of mathematical biology, with special focus in infectious disease epidemiology, wound healing and tumor growth.

As of 2020, Flegg also serves as an editorial board member for PLOS Computational Biology, eLife and the Bulletin of Mathematical Biology.

== Awards and honors ==
In 2020, Flegg was awarded the JH Michell Medal for excellence in research by ANZIAM (Australian and New Zealand Industrial and Applied Mathematics), as well as the Christopher Heyde Medal from the Australian Academy of Science and the Society of Mathematical Biology. In 2025, Flegg was awarded the EO Tuck Medal by the Australian Mathematical Society in recognition of her outstanding research and distinguished service to the field of applied mathematics. She was elected a Fellow of the Australian Academy of Science in 2026.
