= Maria Makrides =

Australian research dietician

Professor Maria Makrides FAA FAHMS
- Education: Ph.D., Flinders University
- Scientific career
- Institutions: University of Adelaide
- Thesis: The role of dietary Omega 3 long chain polyunsaturated fatty acids in tissue composition and visual acuity development of term infants

Maria Makrides is an Australian professor at the University of Adelaide who works on improving women and babies nutritional health. In 2019 she was made a fellow of the Australian Academy of Science. She is a professor of human nutrition at the Adelaide Medical School, and a theme leader for the South Australian Health and Medical Research Institute (SAHMRI) Women's and Children's Hospital.

== Personal life ==
Makrides is a Greek-Australian.

== Research ==
Makrides is a dietician, specialising in translational research on the nutrition and health of mothers and babies. She works on health effects of different dietary supplements, including fatty acids and iron during the perinatal period. Makrides work has led to changes in infant formulae as well as improving food laws internationally (Codex Alimentarius). Most recently Maria was part of an international expert advisory group to comment on the composition of follow-up formulas under review by Codex.

== Gender equality ==
Makrides gave a speech on "Standing on the Shoulders of Giants: Great Women Role Models of my Career" when awarded the first woman for a lifetime achievement award. Makrides also has created a network in South Australia to support South Australian women in STEMM. “We’re trying to provide forums and networking opportunities, sponsorship and mentorship for women working in the sciences to reach their full potential”. “Although individual places have their own programs, it's sometimes helpful to discuss common issues across institutional boundaries. Being a relatively small state, the more we can do together in a collaborative way becomes helpful for women who are trying to make a career in the sciences”.

== Select publications ==
Makrides is the co-editor of four books, including a textbook in paediatric nutrition, now translated into Chinese, Spanish and Russian. She also leads Trajan Nutrition which has multiple publications on nutritional health. Her publications can be found at Google Scholar. She has over 160 publications including in journals such as JAMA.

== Awards ==
- 2022 – SA Science Excellence and Innovation Award Scientist of the Year
- 2019 – Fellowship Australian Academy of Science.
- 2018 – Makrides was the first woman to receive the "Alexander Leaf Distinguished Scientist Award for Lifetime Achievement" which was awarded at the ISSFAL Congress, 2018.
- 2015 – 12th Fatty Acid and Cell Signalling (FACS) award for testing novel hypotheses in large scale clinical trials.
- 2014 – Fellowship of the Australian Academy of Health and Medical Science.
- 2012 – Fellowship of Nutrition Society of Australia.
- 2012 – International Women's Day Award, Organisation of Hellenic Women of Australia.
- 2006 – Nutritional Society of Australia Research Medal.

== Media ==
- Makrides work on paediatric nutrition and omega-3 was highlighted by the ABC in 2018.
- Makrides' nomination for the Australian Academy of Science was described in The Advertiser.
