= Edgar King =

Australian surgeon and pathologist (1900–1966)

Edgar Samuel John King (10 June 1900, Mosgiel, Otago, New Zealand – 31 January 1966, East Melbourne, Victoria, Australia), was an Australian surgeon and pathologist.
