= Aibing Yu =

Chinese Australian chemical engineer

- Born: China
- Occupations: Engineer, academic, and author

Academic background
- Education: Bachelor of Engineering (NEU, China); Master of Engineering (NEU, China); PhD (UoW, Australia); D.Sc., (UNSW, Australia)
- Thesis: Packing of solid particles (1989)

Academic work
- Institutions: Monash University

Aibing Yu (born 1963) is a Chinese–Australian chemical engineer and academic. He is currently with Great Bay University, China, as a Distinguished Professor and Director of the Centre for Smart Processing Engineering. He is also with Northeastern University as Distinguished Professor and Director of Research Institute for Particle Science and Technology; and University of New South Wales as Adjunct Professor. Prior to that, he served as Pro Vice-Chancellor (China Strategies) and Foundation President (Suzhou) at Monash University where he was also Sir John Monash Distinguished Professor and Director of ARC Research Hub for Smart Process Design and BHP-Baowu-Monash Knowledge Centre for LCM.

== Education ==
Yu completed his Bachelor of Engineering degree from Northeastern University in 1982, followed by a Master of Engineering degree from the same institution in 1985. In 1989, he obtained a PhD from the University of Wollongong. Later, in 2007, he obtained a DSc degree from the University of New South Wales.

== Career ==
Yu began his career in 1990 as a postdoctoral fellow with the CSIRO Division of Mineral & Process Engineering for two years. After working as a Research Fellow with the University of Wollongong for about half a year, in the mid of 1992, he joined the University of New South Wales, as a Lecturer from 1992 to 1994, Senior Lecturer from 1995 to 1997, Associate Professor from 1998 to 2000, professor from 2000 to 2014, and Scientia Professor from 2007 to 2014. In May 2014, he joined Monash University as Vice Chancellor's Professorial Fellow (since 2021, changed to Sir John Monash Distinguished Professor), Pro Vice-Chancellor and President of Suzhou campus, based in Melbourne and Suzhou. During June 2024 – April 2025, he was Pro Vice-Chancellor (China Strategies) as well as Foundation President (Suzhou), based in Melbourne. Since May 2025, he joined Great Bay University in Dongguan, China, being Distinguished Professor and Director of the Centre for Smart Process Engineering. He is also Distinguished Professor and Director of the Research Institute for Particle Science and Technology, Northeastern University in Shenyang, China.

Yu was President from 2007 to 2008, Chair of Advisory Board from 2009 to 2010 and has been Honorary President since 2011 of the Federation of Chinese Scholars in Australia.

== Works ==
Yu's research focuses on particle/powder technology and process engineering, with over 1,300 publications. He has organized international conferences and supervised over 60 postdoctoral fellows and 160 PhD students. He is the Editor-in-Chief of Powder Technology, the flagship journal in particle science and technology, and has held editorial roles with other journals.

Yu has founded notable multidisciplinary research institutes and centers at both the national and university levels. From 2000 to 2007, he was the Inaugural Director of the UNSW Multidisciplinary Research Centre for Simulation and Modelling of Particulate Systems. He also served as the deputy director of the ARC Centre of Excellence for Functional Nanomaterials from 2008 to 2010 and as the Founding Director of the Australia-China Joint Research Centre for Minerals, Metallurgy and Materials from 2013 to 2015. From 2016 to 2021, he directed the ARC Industrial Transformation Hub for Computational Particle Technology and has been directing the ARC Industrial Transformation Hub for Smart Process Design and Control since 2023. His roles on management committees and advisory boards include chairing the Technical Advisory Committee of the Baosteel-Australian Universities Joint R&D Centre since 2011. In Suzhou, he has established the Specialized Research Institute for Process Modelling and Optimization, the Monash Suzhou Research Institute, and the BHP-Baowu-Monash Knowledge Centre for Low Carbon Metallurgy.

== Awards and honors ==
- 2002 – Josef Kapitan Ironmaking Award, Iron and Steel Society (ISS)
- 2004 – Fellow, Australian Academy of Technological Sciences and Engineering (ATSE)
- 2005–09 – ARC Australian Professorial Fellowship (APF) Award
- 2008–13 – ARC Federation Fellowship (FF) Award
- 2010 – Ian Wark Medal and Lecture, Australian Academy of Science
- 2010 – ExxonMobil Award, Australian and New Zealand Federation of Chemical Engineers
- 2010 – NSW Scientist of the Year in Engineering, Mathematics and Computer Sciences, UNSW
- 2011 – Fellow, Australian Academy of Science (AAS)
- 2017 – Fellow, Foreign Academician of Chinese Academy of Engineering
- 2019 – Thomas Baron Award in Fluid-Particle Systems, American Institute of Chemical Engineers
- 2020 – Friendship Award of Lushan, Jiangxi Province
- 2020 – International Science and Technology Cooperation Award, Jiangsu Province
