= Mervyn Silas Paterson =

Australian geophysicist (1925–2020)

Mervyn Silas Paterson (1925–2020) was an Australian geologist. He was a fellow of the Australian Academy of Science, the Mineralogical Society of America, and the American Geophysical Union. He won a Walter H. Bucher Medal in 2004.
