= John Roderick =

John Roderick may refer to:

- John Roderick (American football), American football player
- John Roderick (correspondent), American journalist
- John Roderick (musician), member of the American bands The Long Winters and Harvey Danger
- Jack Roderick (politician), mayor of Anchorage, Alaska
