= Chris Flegg =

British singer

Chris Flegg is a British singer, guitarist and songwriter based in St Albans, who has produced a number of albums, written in contemporary folk and jazz styles. His work appeared on local UK radio stations.

== Background ==
Originally from Eastleigh in Hampshire, Flegg moved to London to graduate in physics from Imperial College in 1970, becoming involved first with Imperial College Folk Club and the Troubadour Folk Club where he became co-resident with Redd Sullivan and Martin Winsor which is remembered in his song Troubadour Cafe. This started his song writing and solo work and at the same time he took an interest in jazz, notably through a chance meeting with a guitarist called Diz Disley. After leaving college, jazz tended to have a greater influence with London-based bands ranging from a Hot Club style acoustic band to mainstream combo and Dixieland bands such as Dick Laurie's Elastic Band.

Once he had moved to St Albans in 2000 he discovered the remnants of the folk scene through meeting singer/guitarist John Breeze and became resident at John's Windward Folk Club alongside songwriter George Papavgeris and this rekindled his urge to write songs. Currently he plays local gigs with his jazz trio Mellowtone and solo gigs including folk clubs. He has also fundraised for charity by busking in support of the British Heart Foundation.

== Albums ==
A back catalogue of compositions written as a vehicle for jazz improvisation led in 2000 to a jazz quartet album of original tunes, Moving On. On the folk side, a retrospective album in 2004 of covers and originals, Solo, was followed by three albums of newly written original songs, My Sweet Lady, Through The Window and The Sound Of Life.

In 2009, Flegg recorded a jazz album called Her Favourite Flower, playing jazz standards plus a few original instrumentals, with bassist John Rees Jones, and a solo guitar instrumental album called My Green Guitar, playing a range of material from Cavatina to Round Midnight. A new album for 2010 called Time Precious Time featured original songs with instrumental backing from Vicki Swan and Jonny Dyer as well as harmonica solos from Steve Lockwood. This was followed in 2013 by Gazing At The Stars All Night, again with original material and in 2015 by The Road To The Rainbow's End.

== Radio play ==
Tracks from the folk oriented albums Through The Window and The Sound Of Life are frequently listed in play lists for local stations such as the Folk Show on Radio Argyll. The jazz oriented albums such as Her Favourite Flower similarly have tracks listed in playlists for jazz programs such as John Hellings Jazz Show on Midlands BBC.

== Instruments ==
For acoustic and folk gigs Flegg favours Gibson and Martin guitars, recording using mainly a green Gibson L-4A acoustic and a Martin OMC41 (Richie Sambora signature model). For jazz, he uses a Les Paul Custom or a Gibson L-5 as shown on the cover of the album Her Favourite Flower. The green Gibson L-4A acoustic is also featured on the My Green Guitar album.

== Discography ==
- Her Favourite Flower (2009)
- Twenty is Plenty (2023)
