= Charles Priestley (meteorologist) =

British meteorologist (1915–1998)

Charles Henry Brian (Bill) Priestley, AO FAA FRS (8 July 1915 – 18 May 1998) was a British meteorologist who spent much of his career at the CSIRO in Australia.

== Education ==
Priestley was born in Highgate, London on 8 July 1915. He was educated at Cambridge University, where he graduated with first class honors in Applied Mathematics in 1937 and in Economics a year later.

== Career ==
Priestley joined the British Meteorological Office in 1939 and was asked to study turbulent diffusion in the atmospheric boundary layer (the first few hundred meters of the atmosphere above the earth's surface). In 1943 he was transferred to the upper-air unit and helped prepare the D-Day weather forecast.

After the war, he was recommended for a new position as head of a research group at CSIRO in Australia to carry out atmospheric research. He moved with his wife to Melbourne in 1946 as Officer-in-Charge of the Meteorological Physics Section. There, over some 30 years, the team studies included atmospheric turbulence, geophysical fluid dynamics, and atmospheric chemistry.

Priestley served on the committee of the World Meteorological Organization from 1964 to 1969 and as chairman in 1968.

He retired from the position in 1972 to become Chairman of CSIRO's Environmental Physics Research Laboratories from 1973 to 1977 and then part-time Professor of Mathematics at Monash University. He retired completely in the late 1980s and died in 1998.

== Honors and awards ==
- 1937 Mayhew Prize from the University of Cambridge
- 1949 Awarded Buchan Prize of the Royal Meteorological Society
- 1953 D.Sc., University of Cambridge
- 1955 Elected Fellow of the Australian Academy of Science
- 1956 Awarded David Syme Research Prize from Melbourne University
- 1966 Elected Fellow of the Royal Society
- 1967 Awarded Symons Gold Medal of the Royal Meteorological Society
- 1973 IMO Prize from the World Meteorological Organisation
- 1974 Rossby Research Medal from the American Meteorological Society
- 1976 Matthew Flinders Medal and Lecture of the Australian Academy of Science
- 1976 Officer of the Order of Australia
