= Tim Brodribb =

Australian researcher

Tim Brodribb FAA is an Australian researcher, evolutionary biologist, professor of plant physiology at the University of Tasmania (UTAS), and a fellow of the Australian Academy of Science. He specialises in plant transport and the use of water. His work has led to the discovery of new tools for assessing plants' susceptibility to drought.

His research has been cited 26,323 times, with an h-index of 82 and an i10-index of 192. His work on the global convergence in the vulnerability of forests to drought is his most cited work with a citation of 2,352.

== Education and career ==
Brodribb completed a BSc at the UTAS, followed by a PhD at the same university. Between the years 1999 and 2000, he was a postdoctoral fellow at the University of Tasmania. In 2000, he began his postdoctoral fellowship in organic evolutionary biology at Harvard University and completed the fellowship in 2004. He was a Putnam Fellow at Harvard University in 2005, and from 2006 to 2010, he was an Australian Research Fellow at the University of Adelaide and the University of Tasmania. He is a principal investigator at Australian Research Council Centre of Excellence for Plant Success in Nature and Agriculture

In 2019, he became a professor of plant physiology at the University of Tasmania and, in 2023, he was elected a fellow of the Australian Academy of Science.
