= Brian Gunning =

Australian biologist

Brian Edgar Scourse Gunning FAA, FRS is an Australian biologist and Emeritus Professor at the Australian National University.

Born on 29 November 1934, Gunning attended Methodist College Belfast and Queen's University Belfast.

His work involved the study of plant structure and function using electron microscopy. He was elected a Fellow of the Royal Society in 1980. He now lives (2017) in retirement.
