= Raoul Mulder =

Australian ornithologist and evolutionary ecologist

Professor Raoul Alexander Mulder
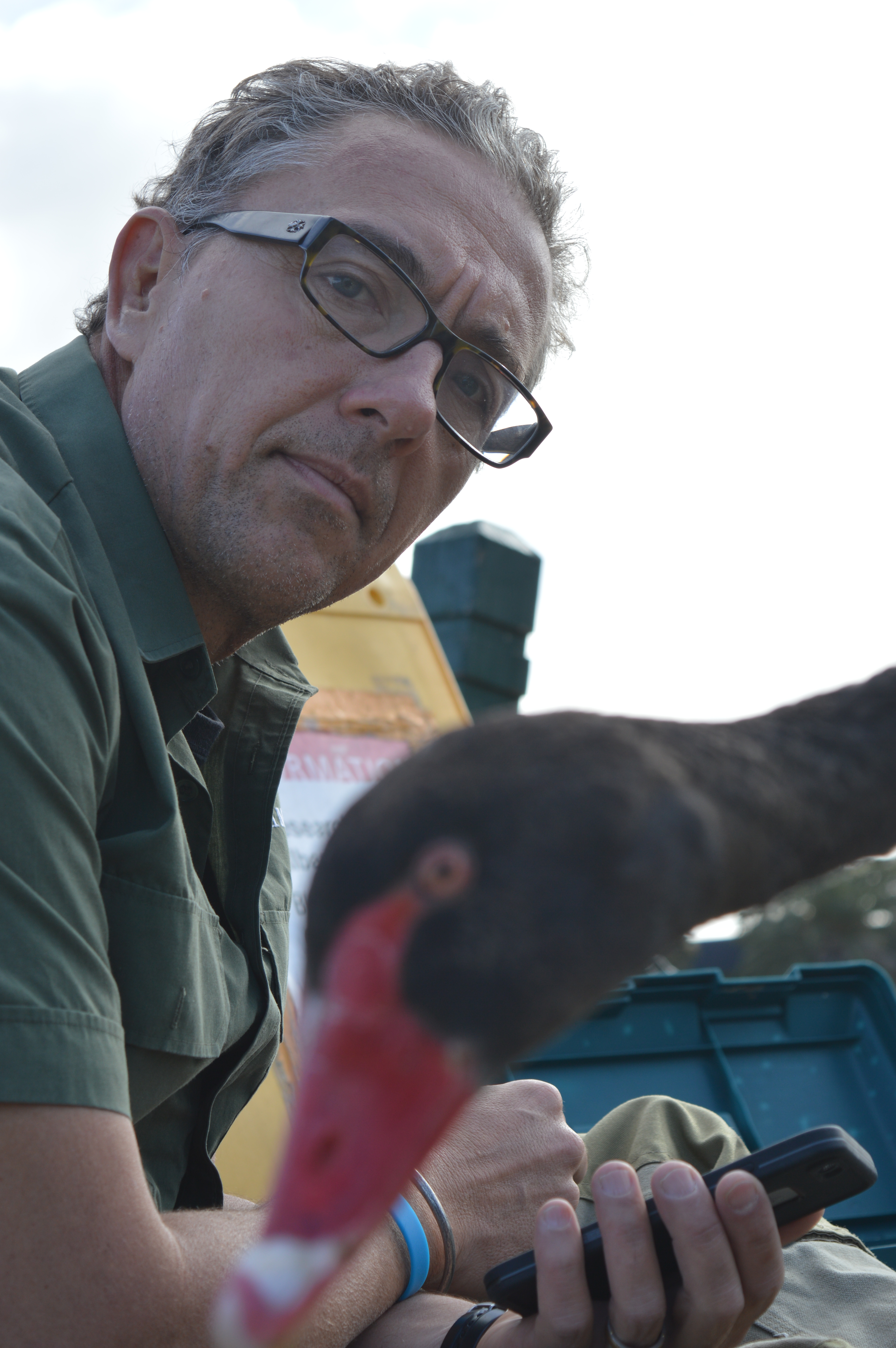
- Raoul Mulder with a black swan at Albert Park Lake, Melbourne.
- Education: Australian National University
- Known for: Evolution of bird mating systems
- Scientific career
- Fields: Evolutionary ecology
- Workplaces: University of Melbourne
- Thesis: Evolutionary ecology of the mating system of superb fairy-wrens (1992)
- Doctoral advisor: Andrew Cockburn
- Website: https://raoulmulder.org/

Raoul Alexander Mulder is an Australian ornithologist and evolutionary ecologist. Based at the University of Melbourne, he is an Associate Dean of Academic Innovation for the Faculty of Science and former head of the School of BioSciences.

== Research career ==
Mulder completed his Bachelor of Science at Australian National University, majoring in biochemistry, but a field trip to Kakadu National Park turned his attention to biology instead. He completed his Honours and PhD at the Australian National University under ornithologist Andrew Cockburn, submitting his thesis in 1992.

Mulder subsequently spent time in Madagascar studying male plumage dichromatism in the Madagascar paradise flycatcher. He spent one year as a technical advisor to the World Wide Fund for Nature in southern Madagascar, then served as a World Learning academic director in both Botswana and Madagascar. He returned to Australian National University from 1996 to 1998 as an ARC postdoctoral fellow.

Mulder joined the Department of Zoology at the University of Melbourne in 1999 as a lecturer. Much of his research since has focused on the evolutionary and behavioural ecology of black swans and superb fairy-wrens. His lab maintains wild study populations of black swans at Albert Park Lake in Melbourne, and superb fairy-wrens at Serendip Sanctuary near Lara, Victoria. In 2015, Mulder served as head of the newly formed School of BioSciences at the University of Melbourne.

Using DNA fingerprinting, Mulder's PhD research revealed widespread extra-pair paternity in the superb fairy-wren: up to 76% of offspring were sired by males outside their social group. This is among the highest cuckoldry rates of any bird. In black swans, his research found that one in six offspring are the result of breeding outside the social pair.

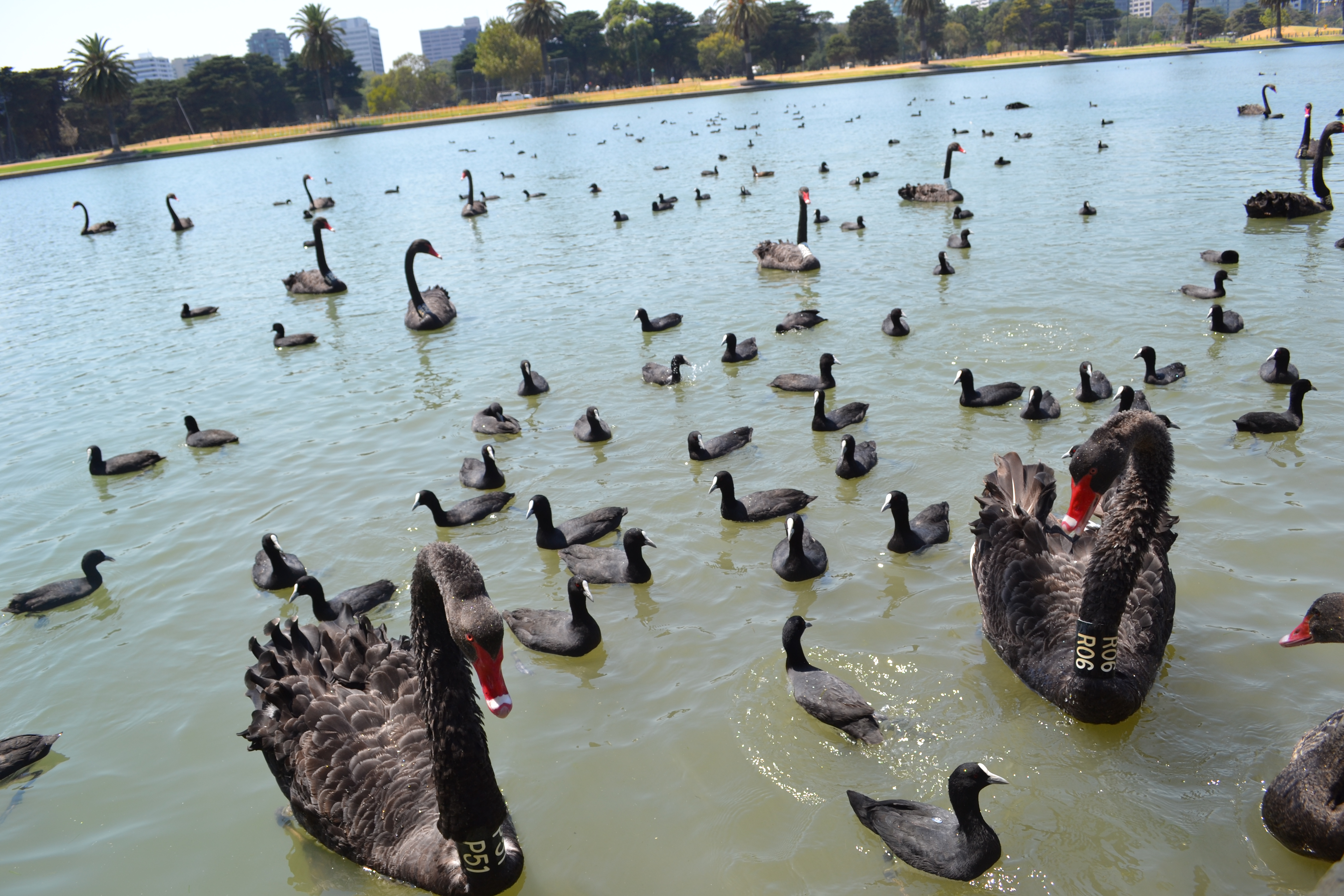
Black swans at Albert Park Lake wearing identifying neck collars as part of Mulder lab research

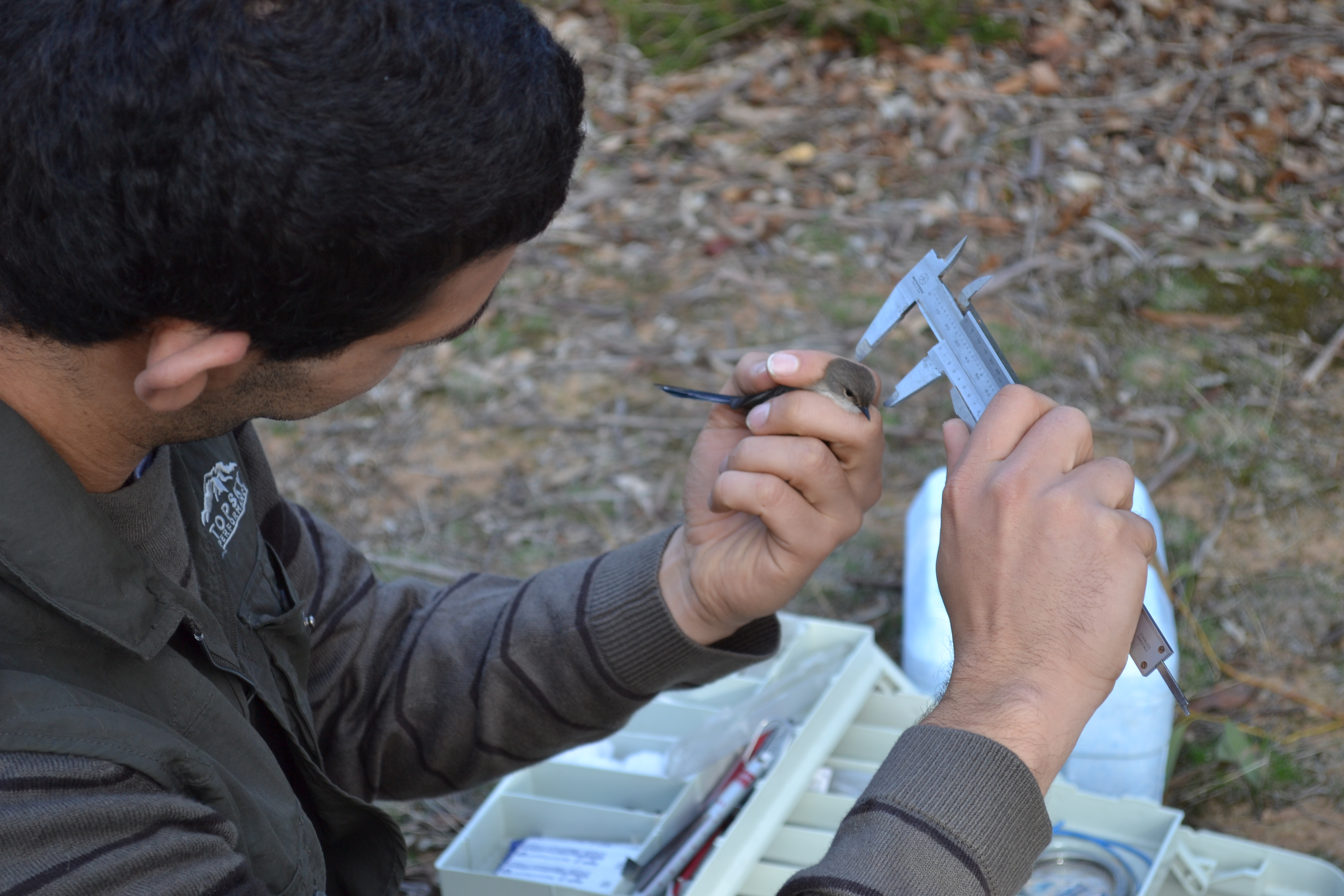
A student measures a superb fairy-wren at Serendip Sanctuary as part of Mulder lab research
