= Robert Antonia =

Australian mechanical engineer

Robert Anthony Antonia
- Born: July 2, 1943 (age 83); Egypt
- Occupations: Engineer, academic
- Known for: Research in turbulent flow

Academic background
- Education: University of Sydney

Academic work
- Institutions: University of Newcastle

Robert Anthony Antonia FAA (born 2 July 1943) is an Australian mechanical engineer and academic who is Emeritus Professor of Mechanical Engineering at the University of Newcastle.

His research has concerned turbulent flows, including surface-roughness effects, small-scale turbulence, measurement methods and large-scale organisation in shear flows. He was elected a Fellow of the Australian Academy of Science in 2004. In 1977, he received the Edgeworth David Medal of the Royal Society of New South Wales.

== Early life and education ==
Antonia was born in Egypt on 2 July 1943. During the 1956 Suez Crisis, his family left Egypt and lived in Bayonne, France, before migrating to Australia in 1958. He later attended De La Salle College Ashfield in Sydney.

Antonia studied at the University of Sydney, where he earned a Bachelor of Engineering, a Master of Engineering Science and a PhD. R. E. Luxton was his doctoral adviser.

== Career ==
After completing his PhD, Antonia spent a year as a postdoctoral researcher in the Department of Aeronautics at Imperial College London, working with Peter Bradshaw. He then returned to the University of Sydney as a lecturer and later became a senior lecturer. In 1976, he joined the University of Newcastle as Professor of Mechanical Engineering.

He is listed by the University of Newcastle as Emeritus Professor in its College of Engineering, Science and Environment.

== Research ==
The Australian Academy of Science's citation for Antonia's election describes his early work on the response of turbulent flows to changes in surface roughness, his later work on small-scale turbulence and small-scale statistics, and his contributions to turbulence measurement and the study of large-scale organisation in shear flows. His University of Newcastle profile lists research on momentum and heat transport in shear flows, transport in the atmospheric surface layer, turbulent diffusion, small-scale turbulence, and the manipulation and control of turbulent flows.

With R. E. Luxton, Antonia published experimental studies of turbulent boundary layers following smooth-to-rough and rough-to-smooth step changes in surface roughness. In a 1997 review with K. R. Sreenivasan, he surveyed scaling, intermittency, derivative statistics and the kinematics of small-scale turbulence, including results obtained through direct numerical simulation.

Antonia and his collaborators later investigated finite-Reynolds number effects in the context of assessing the similarity hypotheses as the Reynolds number increases proposed by Andrey Kolmogorov. A 2017 paper in the Journal of Fluid Mechanics reported that measured velocity-structure-function exponents moved closer to the values predicted by Kolmogorov's 1941 theory as Reynolds number increased. The authors argued that finite-Reynolds-number effects should be accounted for before deviations from the 1941 predictions are attributed to intermittency corrections, and questioned interpretations that treated those effects as consequences of Kolmogorov's 1962 refined similarity hypothesis. A 2019 paper in Physical Review Fluids surveyed published data and concluded that the Reynolds numbers reached in experiments and simulations were not yet high enough for the four-fifths law to be observed.

== Awards and honours ==
- Edgeworth David Medal, Royal Society of New South Wales (1977)
- Fellow of the Australian Academy of Science (2004)
- Fellow of the Australasian Fluid Mechanics Society (2010)

== Selected publications ==
- Antonia, R. A.; Luxton, R. E. (1971). "The response of a turbulent boundary layer to a step change in surface roughness. Part 1. Smooth to rough". Journal of Fluid Mechanics. 48 (4): 721–761. Bibcode:1971JFM....48..721A. doi:10.1017/S0022112071001824.
- Anselmet, F.; Gagne, Y.; Hopfinger, E. J.; Antonia, R. A. (1984). "High-order velocity structure functions in turbulent shear flows". Journal of Fluid Mechanics. 140: 63–89. Bibcode:1984JFM...140...63A. doi:10.1017/S0022112084000513.
- Sreenivasan, K. R.; Antonia, R. A. (1997). "The phenomenology of small-scale turbulence". Annual Review of Fluid Mechanics. 29: 435–472. Bibcode:1997AnRFM..29..435S. doi:10.1146/annurev.fluid.29.1.435.
- Antonia, R. A.; Djenidi, L.; Danaila, L.; Tang, S. L. (2017). "Small scale turbulence and the finite Reynolds number effect". Physics of Fluids. 29 (2): 020715. Bibcode:2017PhFl...29b0715A. doi:10.1063/1.4974323.
- Tang, S. L.; Antonia, R. A.; Djenidi, L.; Danaila, L.; Zhou, Y. (2017). "Finite Reynolds number effect on the scaling range behaviour of turbulent longitudinal velocity structure functions". Journal of Fluid Mechanics. 820: 341–369. Bibcode:2017JFM...820..341T. doi:10.1017/jfm.2017.218.
- Antonia, R. A.; Tang, S. L.; Djenidi, L.; Zhou, Y. (2019). "Finite Reynolds number effect and the 4/5 law". Physical Review Fluids. 4 (8) 084602. Bibcode:2019PhRvF...4h4602A. doi:10.1103/PhysRevFluids.4.084602.
