= Hardham (surname) =

Hardham is a surname. Notable people with the surname include:

- Adrienne Ruth Hardham, professor of plant sciences at Australian National University
- William Hardham (1876–1928), New Zealand soldier
