= Alfred Gottschalk =

Alfred Gottschalk may refer to:

- Alfred Gottschalk (biochemist) (1894–1973), glycoprotein researcher
- Alfred Gottschalk (rabbi) (1930–2009), President of Hebrew Union College
