= Levon Khachigian =

Australian medical scientist

- Born: 6 March 1964 (age 62); Beirut, Lebanon
- Education: University of New South Wales
- Known for: translational research Dz13
- Awards: Gottschalk Medal
- Scientific career
- Fields: vascular biology
- Workplaces: University of New South Wales
- Website: http://medicalsciences.med.unsw.edu.au/user/21799

Levon Michael Khachigian (born 6 March 1964 in Beirut, Lebanon) is an Australian medical research scientist infamous for research misconduct in vascular cell and molecular biology. He is a Professor in the Faculty of Medicine at the University of New South Wales.

Khachigian is known for his studies in the area of transcriptional control and for translating basic discoveries into potential novel therapeutics. He is the inventor of the experimental drug Dz13, which may help treat a range of common diseases or complications including skin cancer, post-angioplasty restenosis, macular degeneration and asthma.

== Early life and education ==
Khachigian was born to Armenian parents who served as evangelical missionaries in the Middle East and migrated to Australia at age 18 months. He was raised in Naremburn, New South Wales, Australia, and attended Naremburn Public School and later Crows Nest Boys' High School.

Khachigian obtained a B.Sc. with first-class honours in biochemistry in 1986 and Ph.D. in growth factor biochemistry and cell biology in 1993 from the University of New South Wales. He performed doctoral research at the School of Medicine, St George Hospital (Sydney), Division of Biomolecular Engineering, Commonwealth Scientific and Industrial Research Organisation and Department of Haematology, Prince of Wales Hospital (Sydney). He obtained a D.Sc. in vascular biology and transcriptional control in 2004 from the University of New South Wales.

== Research ==
Khachigian is a vascular biologist with a strong focus on "bench to bedside" translational research. His research has centered mainly on interrogating the roles of immediate-early genes (such as Egr1 and c-Jun) as molecular switches in the pathogenesis of disease. He and his collaborators have uncovered regulatory networks underpinning waves of transcriptional change in cellular activation in a range of single gene and systems-based approaches. Khachigian has developed a range of interventional approaches to target key regulatory genes for the development of novel therapeutics, particularly catalytic DNA.

Khachigian invented Dz13, a molecule that targets the transcription factor c-Jun, implicated in a range of common proliferative, occlusive and inflammatory diseases. In 1999 Khachigian reported the first use of catalytic DNA as new experimental drugs in an animal model of any kind. In 2013 he reported the first clinical use of catalytic DNA in human subjects. This was later followed by numerous other independent, some multi-center, clinical trials evaluating DNAzymes in humans, including DNAzymes targeting EBV-LMP1 in patients with nasopharyngeal cancer and DNAzymes targeting another nuclear transcription factor GATA3 in patients with allergic asthma demonstrating DNAzyme efficacy and safety. Targeted catalytic DNA-based molecular therapy may represent a novel, effective and less invasive therapeutic approach in humans.

== Career ==
After obtaining his Ph.D. and with the support of a CJ Martin Research Fellowship from the National Health and Medical Research Council of Australia and Fulbright Program, Khachigian studied vascular biology and transcriptional control with Professor Tucker Collins at Brigham and Women's Hospital, Harvard Medical School, Boston, US. On returning to Australia in 1996 he established the Transcription Laboratory within the Centre for Vascular Research, Faculty of Medicine at the University of New South Wales. He has been supported by an NHMRC RD Wright Fellowship, Principal Research Fellowship, Senior Principal Research Fellowship and the Australia Fellowship. In 2004 Khachigian was appointed Professor in Medicine and in 2009 appointed Director of the Centre for Vascular Research, succeeding its Foundation Director Scientia Professor Colin Chesterman AO.

== Service ==
Khachigian has a strong record of service to international and national scientific societies and has been at the helm of numerous international conferences in vascular biology, drug design and discovery, and interdisciplinary health and medical research, including the International Vascular Biology Meeting and Congress of the International Society on Thrombosis and Haemostasis. He has served as president of the Australian Society for Medical Research and president of the Australian Vascular Biology Society. He is a member of the Faculty of 1000.

== Awards ==
Khachigian has received numerous prestigious national and international awards including the Commonwealth Health Minister's Award for Excellence in Health and Medical Research, GlaxoSmithKline Award for Research Excellence, Gottschalk Medal from the Australian Academy of Science, Khwarizmi International Award for Science and Technology, and 3 separate Eureka Prizes from the Australian Museum for scientific research, medical research and international scientific collaboration.

== Investigations ==
The University of New South Wales investigated matters involving Khachigian in accordance with the Australian Code for the Responsible Conduct of Research. Khachigian maintained there was no wrongdoing and a trial involving Dz13 was put on hold “to err on the side of caution”. Six research articles co-authored by Khachigian have been retracted and one corrected. None of the independent external expert panels of inquiry or investigations conducted under the Australian Code made any finding of research misconduct on the part of Khachigian, and they concluded that breaches arose from genuine error or honest oversight. In 2017, a fifth independent external expert panel, set up following the Australian Research Integrity Committee’s review of all previous independent investigations by external experts, came to the same conclusion that there was no finding of research misconduct. This decision was discussed in a news article by the Australian Broadcasting Corporation in October 2019. Some members of the panels have expressed concerns about the handling of the investigations.
