= Ron Giovanelli =

Physicist and solar researcher

Ronald Gordon Giovanelli DSc, FAA
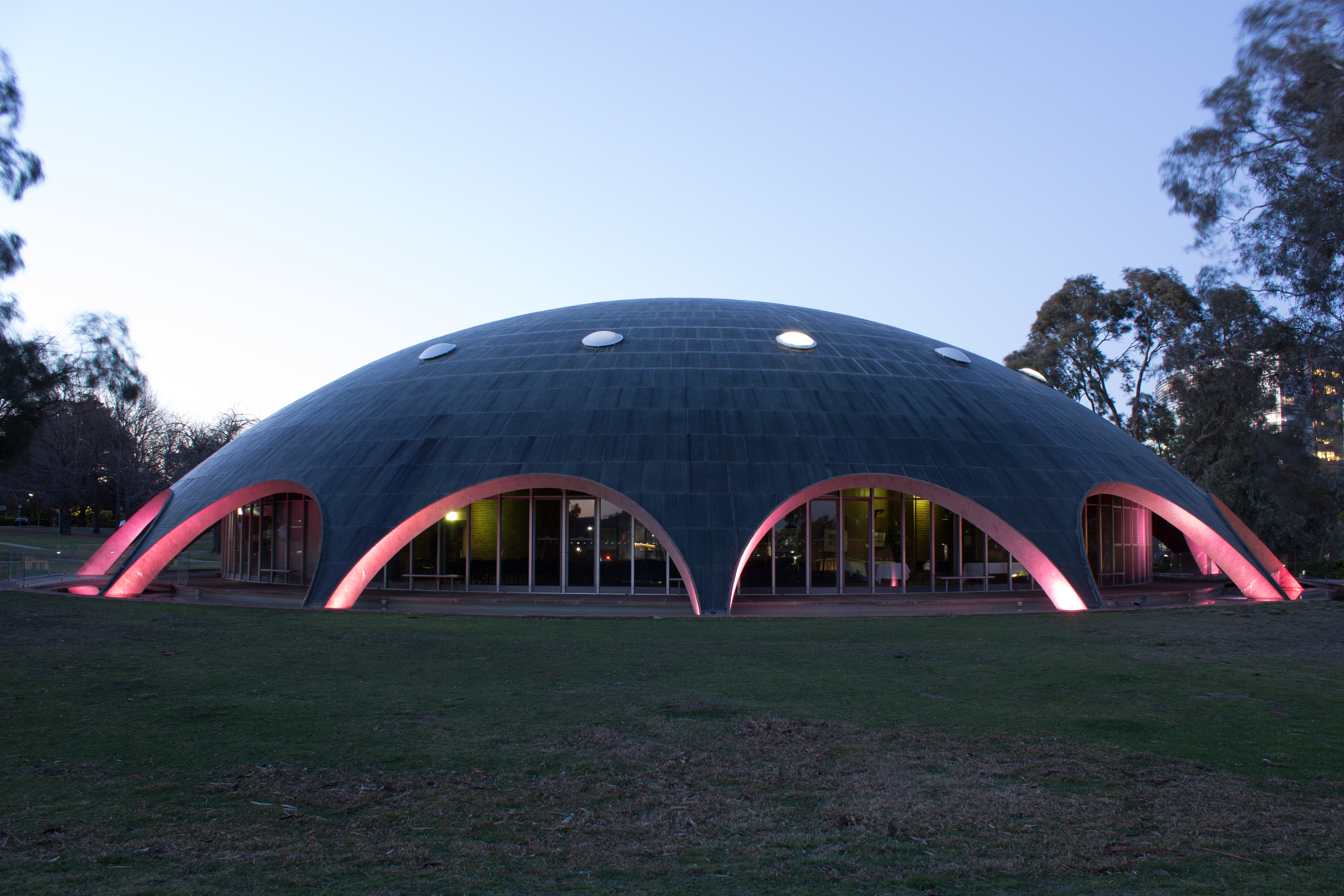
- The Shine Dome at the Australian Academy of Science in Canberra, Australia
- Born: Grafton, New South Wales, Australia 30 April 1915
- Died: Camperdown, New South Wales 27 January 1984 (aged 69)
- Education: Fort Street High School, The University of Sydney (1933–1937)
- Known for: Astrophysics, Optics
- Spouse: Katherine Hazel Gordon (m. 1947)
- Awards: Edgeworth David Medal, 1949
- Elected: 1962, Fellowship of Australian Academy of Science

Ronald Gordon Giovanelli, DSc, FAA (/dʒoʊvɑ’nɛli/; 30 April 1915 – 27 January 1984) was an Australian solar researcher, astronomer and physicist, who contributed to the fields of astrophysics, solar physics, radiative transfer, and astronomical optics. His career spanned more than 40 years, commencing prior to World War II. Giovanelli was the recipient of the 1949 Edgeworth David Medal by the Royal Society of New South Wales for the discipline of astrophysics, which recognises distinguished contributions by scientists under the age of 35 in their respective fields. He was also elected into the Fellowship of the Australian Academy of Science in 1962 for his contributions in the field of physics.

Giovanelli served as Chief of the Physics Division of the Commonwealth Scientific and Industrial Research Organisation (CSIRO) from 1958 to 1976, during which he also became Chairman of the Australian National Committee from 1962 to 1965, President of the Astronomical Society of Australia from 1968 to 1971, and President of Commission 12 (Solar Radiation) of the International Astronomical Union from 1973 to 1976. He served as Chairman of the Australian National Committee for Solar-Terrestrial Physics in 1973, and from 1979 to 1981.

== Early life and education ==
Ronald Gordon Giovanelli was born on 30 April 1915 in Grafton, New South Wales. He was the only child of Irwin Wilfred Giovanelli, a schoolteacher, and Gertrude May. Ronald's great-grandfather Giuseppe migrated from Ravenna, Italy to Sydney during the 1850s. He settled and married in Sydney, with his wife giving birth to their son George Henry in 1857. George Henry would go on to marry Lucy Ellen Arkey and have eight children, with Irwin Wilfred, Ronald's father, being born on 7 August 1887.

Irwin Wilfred attended school in Grafton, and proceeded to attend Sydney Teacher's College. With this training, he became a mathematics teacher at Grafton High School. Irwin Wilfred earned respect and recognition as a teacher, and started serving as a headmaster at various schools in the country. With his father becoming a headmaster, Ronald attended a variety of schools in the towns of Milton, Trundle, and Forbes in New South Wales during his early years. Upon turning 12 years old, he moved from the country to Sydney to board privately while attending Fort Street Boys' High School. He was made prefect based on his academic performance. During his time in school, Ronald started taking an interest in music and sports, playing the piano and tennis.

After finishing his studies in Fort Street Boys' High School, he decided to attend the University of Sydney, where he studied a Bachelor of Science, and subsequently graduated with First Class Honours in Mathematics and Physics in 1937. He proceeded to do a master's degree and doctorate, obtaining his M.Sc. and D.Sc. in 1939 and 1950, respectively. While obtaining these degrees, Giovanelli conducted a lot of scientific research, for which he was awarded the Edgeworth David Medal. He married Katherine Hazel Gordon on 8 February 1947 at St. Michael's Church of England in Vaucluse. Katherine was a painter, and also served as one of his laboratory assistants. The pair had two children – Lesley Anne, born December 1948, and Philip Gordon, born November 1950.

== Career ==
Giovanelli was appointed as a research fellow at the Commonwealth Solar Observatory (now known as Mount Stromlo Observatory) at Mount Stromlo, Canberra from 1937 to 1939, while he was completing his master's degree. His role as a research fellow at the observatory developed his interest in solar active regions and optical astronomy. He also served as a physics teacher at Sydney Technical College from 1939 to 1940. In 1938, The Commonwealth government created a National Standards Laboratory (NSL) within the Commonwealth Scientific and Industrial Research Organisation. Giovanelli and eight other scientists were recruited by the CSIR as research scholars to develop the NSL, primarily tasked with being able to establish national standards of measurement. The nine scientists were to work at the British National Physical Laboratory in Teddington, South West London under the supervision of George Henry Briggs, who was Officer-in-Charge of the Physics division of the NSL during that time. The purpose of the assignment was to gain experience that could assist them in accomplishing this task. Giovanelli sailed for England in February 1940, where he specialised in optics, light, and photometry. During his time in the British National Physical Laboratory, he attended scientific symposiums in The Royal Institution in London, as well as visiting The University of Cambridge, where he was able to meet Sir Arthur Eddington OM FRS due to the earlier work he conducted during his stint at the Commonwealth Solar Observatory.

Giovanelli returned to Sydney in 1941 via Canada and the United States, where he visited the National Research Council of Canada in Ottawa, and the National Bureau of Standards (now known as the National Institute of Standards and Technology) in Washington, D.C. He returned to a newly constructed NSL building within the University of Sydney. The occurrence of World War II meant that the NSL's tasks were diverted from creating measurement standards towards more urgent war-time national defence projects. The National Standards Laboratory was then declared as a full division in the Council for Scientific and Industrial Research (CSIR) in 1945.

In 1956, Giovanelli established a small observatory in Fleurs. During this time, Giovanelli desired to measure the sun's velocity, temperature, pressure, and other properties. He wanted to take the sun's measurements over time in the shortest amount of time possible. The execution of these measurements entailed specialised strategies and optical equipment. To carry this out, they required filters that would have extremely high resolutions in order to create an image of the sun. In collaboration with various other physicists, Giovanelli designed and created a 1/8 Å birefringent filter.

=== World War II endeavours ===
As Senior Principal Research Scientist and Leader of the Light division of the CSIRO, Giovanelli contributed greatly to Australian Standards in the fields of optics, photometry, and colorimetry. One of Giovanelli's projects during World War II was the creation and development of special goggles for anti-aircraft spotters, with the purpose of preventing eye damage of spotters who had to observe aircraft coming from the direction of the sun in tropic environments. This was carried out by using tinted lenses, and integrating a centrepiece made of dark glass covering the sun. Another war-time project that Giovanelli engaged in was concerned with issues over dark adaptation by aircraft pilots and gunners. He solved this problem by illuminating instrument panels with red light of a specific intensity. He was one of many Australian scientists responsible for the production of high-grade optical glass during this time, as well as the measurement of their refractive indices and homogeneity which resulted in Australia's war requirements being met, and enabling the establishment of optical industries during the post-war period.

After World War II, universities were rapidly expanding in Australia, resulting in a scarcity of optical scientific equipment for use in the education sector. Giovanelli directed the testing of more than a thousand microscopes to be used for teaching, in collaboration with W.H. Steel at the National Standards Laboratory in Sydney. Giovanelli and Steel were responsible for establishing the microscopes' objective's standard of optical performance.

=== Academia ===
Giovanelli was involved in academia across several institutions. He was appointed as Honorary Associate of the Department of Applied Mathematics at The University of Sydney in 1959, where he was responsible for working with students of solar physics, and overseeing their PhD courses. He was a visiting professor at Collège de France in Paris in 1964 and again in 1982. Giovanelli worked as a professor of physics at Wollongong University College during the academic year 1968, which was considered a college of The University of New South Wales up until 1974. He was also a member of University of New South Wales' professorial board, and gave lectures on astronomy at the university twice a week.

From 1964 to 1965, Giovanelli served as a visiting scientist at the Fraunhofer-Institut (now known as the Leibniz Institute) located in Freiburg, West Germany. He was also a visiting scientist at the Kitt Peak National Observatory in Arizona, USA for six months in 1975 and 1979, and for a year in 1981, where he was involved with measuring the velocities of plasma contained in flux tubes. During this time, he had established and employed the Line-Centre-Magnetogram (LCM) strategy in order to distinguish and separate magnetic and non-magnetic constituents. The LCM scheme is founded on the observation of the Zeeman polarisation. In that same year, Giovanelli gave a lecture on plasma physics at La Trobe University. In 1982, Giovanelli gave lectures at various observatories including the Observatoire de Meudon in Paris, France, the Center for Astrophysics | Harvard & Smithsonian at Harvard in Cambridge, MA, USA, as well as the California Institute of Technology in Pasadena, California.

=== Death and tributes ===
Giovanelli died of chronic pulmonary fibrosis on 27 January 1984 at the Royal Prince Alfred Hospital in Sydney, Australia.

Following his death, various tributes were made in the US and Australia for his contributions to the field of science. For his contribution to the knowledge on solar-terrestrial physics, a stream of workshops on the subject was held in honour of Giovanelli at the sixth National Congress of the Australian Institute of Physics, which took place in Brisbane in August 1984. These workshops operated in co-sponsorship with the Australian Academy of Science.

On 26 to 29 November 1984 in Sydney, a colloquium was held in commemoration of Giovanelli, entitled "Past Progress and Future Developments in Solar and Stellar Atmospheric Physics." The colloquium was attended by 40 astronomers from both Australia and overseas countries including West Germany, US, and France. At one point during this colloquium, all attendees congregated around a sundial located at the grounds of the Division of Applied Physics of the CSIRO in order to take part in a ceremony of dedication and tribute to Ronald Giovanelli's memory.

On 17 to 18 January 1985 in Tucson, Arizona, a second Ronald Giovanelli commemoration colloquium was held. Giovanelli was scheduled to give a speech on the subject of magnetic reconnection at an earlier colloquium in Los Alamos, New Mexico, but was unable to do so due to ill health. He instead prepared a videotaped speech, which was screened at the Tucson colloquium, where he discusses magnetic reconnection, solar prominences, and sunspots.

== Notable works and modern impacts ==
=== Magnetic Reconnection ===
Giovanelli is credited with originating the principle of magnetic reconnection. In October 1983, a magnetic reconnection conference took place at the Los Alamos National Laboratory in New Mexico, USA, which was attended by more than a hundred scientists from over a dozen countries. According to the official records for this conference, it was during this event that Giovanelli was honoured for originating this concept, 37 years after his first published work, documenting the effect. Magnetic reconnection occurs when plasma permeates magnetic boundaries, with the resulting magnetised plasmas flowing towards each other and integrating.

Giovanelli introduced the concept of magnetic reconnection as potentially being mechanism for particle acceleration in solar flares. Giovanelli published an article in 1946 proposing that the production of chromospheric flares are contingent on the energy obtained by these charged particles when operating within induced electric fields within close proximity of sunspots. He establishes the positive correlation between sunspots and chromospheric flares, providing evidence that the occurrence of a chromospheric flare becomes increasingly probable in areas where sunspots are larger. In the years 1947–1948, Giovanelli published two more research papers further developing the reconnection model of the sun's magnetosphere. In these works, he also proposes a flare theory involving points of neutrality within magnetic fields.

Giovanelli's concept of magnetic reconnection has since been utilised for modern solar astronomic research, and has been further developed in a series of published research articles.

=== Secrets of the Sun ===
Towards his death, Giovanelli was working on a monograph entitled 'Secrets of the Sun', which discusses and explains in detail the subject matters of the sun's structure, solar flares, sunspots, and magnetic fields. The English version of 'Secrets of the Sun' was published posthumously in 1984, with the German edition 'Geheimnisvolle Sonne' being published in 1987. 'Secrets of the Sun' was designed as a book for laymen, written without highly technical terminology, scientific jargon or mathematical equations so that it would be comprehended by non-scientists and non-specialists.
