= Laura Mackay =

Australian scientist

Professor Laura Mackay FAA FAHMS
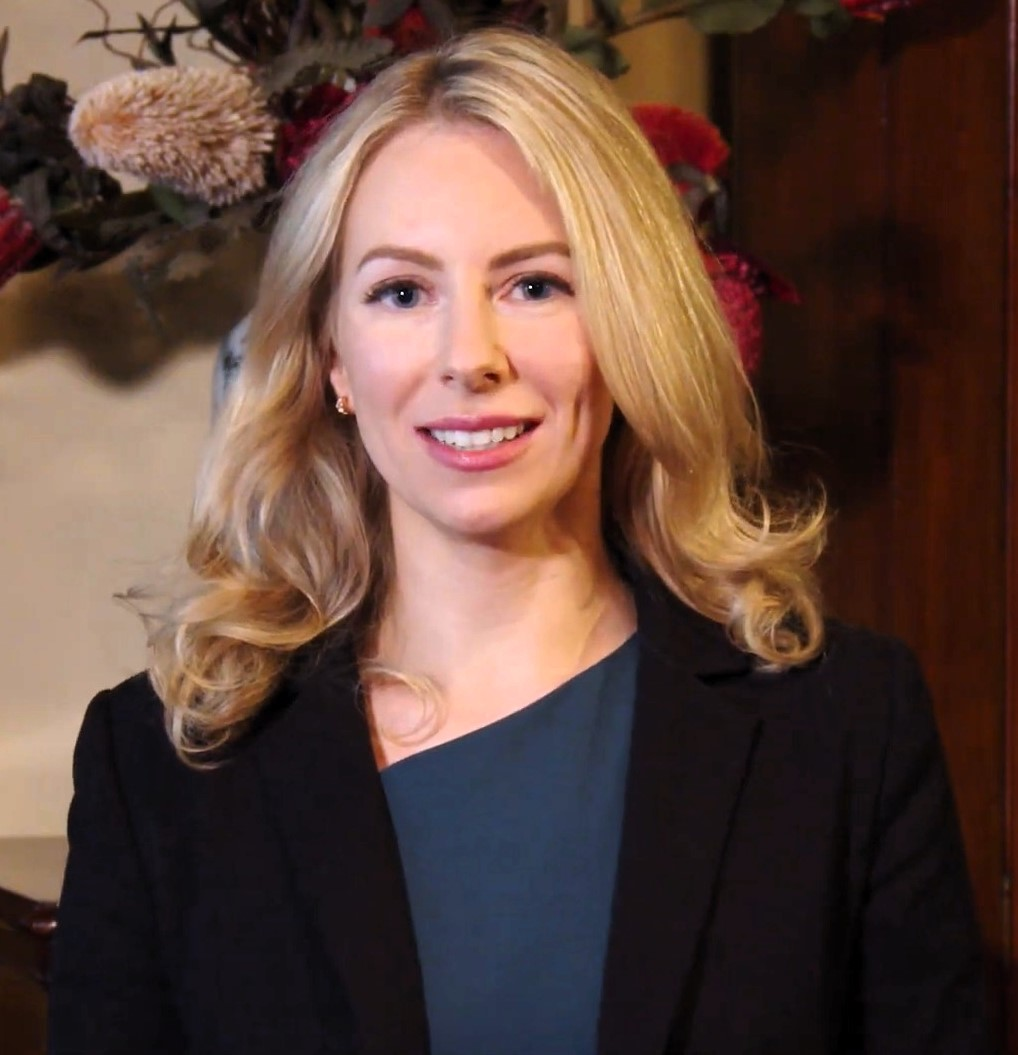
- Mackay in 2021
- Education: University of Birmingham (PhD)
- Known for: Identification and role of tissue-resident memory T cells
- Awards: Jian Zhou Medal; Frank Fenner Prize; Eureka Prize; Gottschalk Medal; Michelson Prize
- Scientific career
- Fields: Immunology
- Workplaces: University of Melbourne; Peter Doherty Institute for Infection and Immunity

Laura K. Mackay is an Australian immunologist and Professor of Immunology at the University of Melbourne. Mackay is the Theme Leader in Immunology and Laboratory Head at the Peter Doherty Institute for Infection and Immunity. In 2022, she was the youngest Fellow elected to the Australian Academy of Health and Medical Sciences.

== Early life and education ==
Mackay completed her undergraduate degree in Biological Science at the University of Warwick in 2004, Masters of Science at the University of Birmingham in 2005 and PhD under the supervision of Professor Alan B. Rickinson, an expert in the research of Epstein-Barr virus in 2009. She undertook postdoctoral training with Professor Francis Carbone at The University of Melbourne. During this period, she was the first to describe the molecular program and developmental features that underpin immune cell tissue residence.

== Career and research ==
Mackay established her research Laboratory at the Peter Doherty Institute for Infection and Immunity at the University of Melbourne in 2016. She was appointed as Senior Lecturer in 2016, Associate-Professor in 2018, and full Professor in 2019. Mackay is also the Theme Leader in Immunology for the Peter Doherty Institute for Infection and Immunity. She has made significant contributions to the field of T cell memory and tissue immunity, with Mackay being listed as a Highly Cited Researcher™ annually since 2019.

In 2018, Mackay was appointed as the President of The Federation of Immunological Sciences of Asia-Oceania (FIMSA). During her tenure, Mackay was the first female and youngest serving President of the organisation.

In 2022, Mackay was the youngest ever Fellow elected to the Australian Academy of Health and Medical Sciences, with the citation on election describing her as "an internationally recognised expert in T cell immunity, contributing landmark papers that have defined how memory T cell responses are generated in body tissues".

== Scientific outreach ==
Mackay serves on the Scientific Advisory Boards for journals Cell, Science Immunology and Trends in Immunology. She is the co-organiser of Global Immunotalks, an online seminar series posted on YouTube featuring world-leading immunologists presenting cutting-edge research, which aims to make the newest discoveries accessible to a global audience. Mackay is also a co-host on National Triple R Radio science show, Einstein-A-Go-Go, communicating science and the latest research to the public. Mackay has been interviewed by Science on diversity in STEM,

== Awards, honours and recognition ==
- 2016 – Tall Poppy Award from Australian Institute of Policy and Science
- 2018 – Michelson Prize for Human Immunology and Vaccine Research
- 2019 – Frank Fenner Prize for Life Scientist of the Year
- 2019 – Eureka Prize for Outstanding Early Career Researcher
- 2019 – Woodward Medal in Science and Technology
- 2019 – Gottschalk Medal
- 2022 – Elected Fellow of the Australian Academy of Health and Medical Sciences
- 2023 – AAMRI Rising Star Award
- 2023 – Jian Zhou Medal
- 2023 – LEO Foundation Award (Region Asia-Pacific)
- 2026 – Elected Fellow of the Australian Academy of Science

== Selected publications ==
- Laura K. Mackay; Azad Rahimpour; Joel Z I Ma; et al. (27 October 2013). "The developmental pathway for CD103(+)CD8+ tissue-resident memory T cells of skin". Nature Immunology. 14 (12): 1294–1301. doi:10.1038/NI.2744. ISSN 1529-2908. PMID 24162776.
- Mackay, Laura K.; Wynne-Jones, Erica; Freestone, David; et al. (2015). "T-box Transcription Factors Combine with the Cytokines TGF-β and IL-15 to Control Tissue-Resident Memory T Cell Fate" (PDF). Immunity. 43 (6): 1101–1111. doi:10.1016/j.immuni.2015.11.008. PMID 26682984.
- Mackay, Laura K.; Minnich, Martina; Kragten, Natasja A. M.; et al. (22 April 2016). "Hobit and Blimp1 instruct a universal transcriptional program of tissue residency in lymphocytes". Science. 352 (6284): 459–463. Bibcode:2016Sci...352..459M. doi:10.1126/science.aad2035. ISSN 0036-8075. PMID 27102484. S2CID 8529687.
- Park, Simone L.; Zaid, Ali; Hor, Jyh Liang; et al. (8 January 2018). "Local proliferation maintains a stable pool of tissue-resident memory T cells after antiviral recall responses". Nature Immunology. 19 (2). Springer Science and Business Media LLC: 183–191. doi:10.1038/s41590-017-0027-5. hdl:10072/382936. ISSN 1529-2908. PMID 29311695. S2CID 2667235.
- Savas, Peter; Virassamy, Balaji; Ye, Chengzhong; et al. (25 June 2018). "Single-cell profiling of breast cancer T cells reveals a tissue-resident memory subset associated with improved prognosis". Nature Medicine. 24 (7). Springer Science and Business Media LLC: 986–993. doi:10.1038/s41591-018-0078-7. ISSN 1078-8956. PMID 29942092. S2CID 49417689.
- Park, Simone L.; Buzzai, Anthony; Rautela, Jai; et al. (31 December 2018). "Tissue-resident memory CD8+ T cells promote melanoma–immune equilibrium in skin". Nature. 565 (7739). Springer Science and Business Media LLC: 366–371. doi:10.1038/s41586-018-0812-9. ISSN 0028-0836. PMID 30598548. S2CID 57189676.
- Frizzell, H.; Fonseca, R.; Christo, S. N.; et al. (3 April 2020). "Organ-specific isoform selection of fatty acid–binding proteins in tissue-resident lymphocytes". Science Immunology. 5 (46). doi:10.1126/sciimmunol.aay9283. ISSN 2470-9468. PMID 32245887. S2CID 214776436.
- Christo, Susan N.; Evrard, Maximilien; Park, Simone L.; et al. (23 August 2021). "Discrete tissue microenvironments instruct diversity in resident memory T cell function and plasticity". Nature Immunology. 22 (9). Springer Science and Business Media LLC: 1140–1151. doi:10.1038/s41590-021-01004-1. ISSN 1529-2908. PMID 34426691. S2CID 237281950.
- Evrard, Maximilien; Wynne-Jones, Erica; Peng, Changwei; et al. (3 January 2022). "Sphingosine 1-phosphate receptor 5 (S1PR5) regulates the peripheral retention of tissue-resident lymphocytes". Journal of Experimental Medicine. 219 (1). doi:10.1084/jem.20210116. ISSN 0022-1007. PMC 8546662. PMID 34677611.
- Fonseca, Raíssa; Burn, Thomas N.; Gandolfo, Luke C.; et al. (26 July 2022). "Runx3 drives a CD8+ T cell tissue residency program that is absent in CD4+ T cells". Nature Immunology. 23 (8). Springer Science and Business Media LLC: 1236–1245. doi:10.1038/s41590-022-01273-4. ISSN 1529-2908. PMID 35882933. S2CID 251104114.
- Laura K Mackay; Heather M Long; Jill M Brooks; et al. (18 December 2009). "T cell detection of a B-cell tropic virus infection: newly-synthesised versus mature viral proteins as antigen sources for CD4 and CD8 epitope display". PLOS Pathogens. 5 (12) e1000699. doi:10.1371/JOURNAL.PPAT.1000699. ISSN 1553-7366. PMC 2788701. PMID 20019813.
