= Gordon Dougan =

Professor at University of Cambridge

Gordon Dougan FRS FMedSci
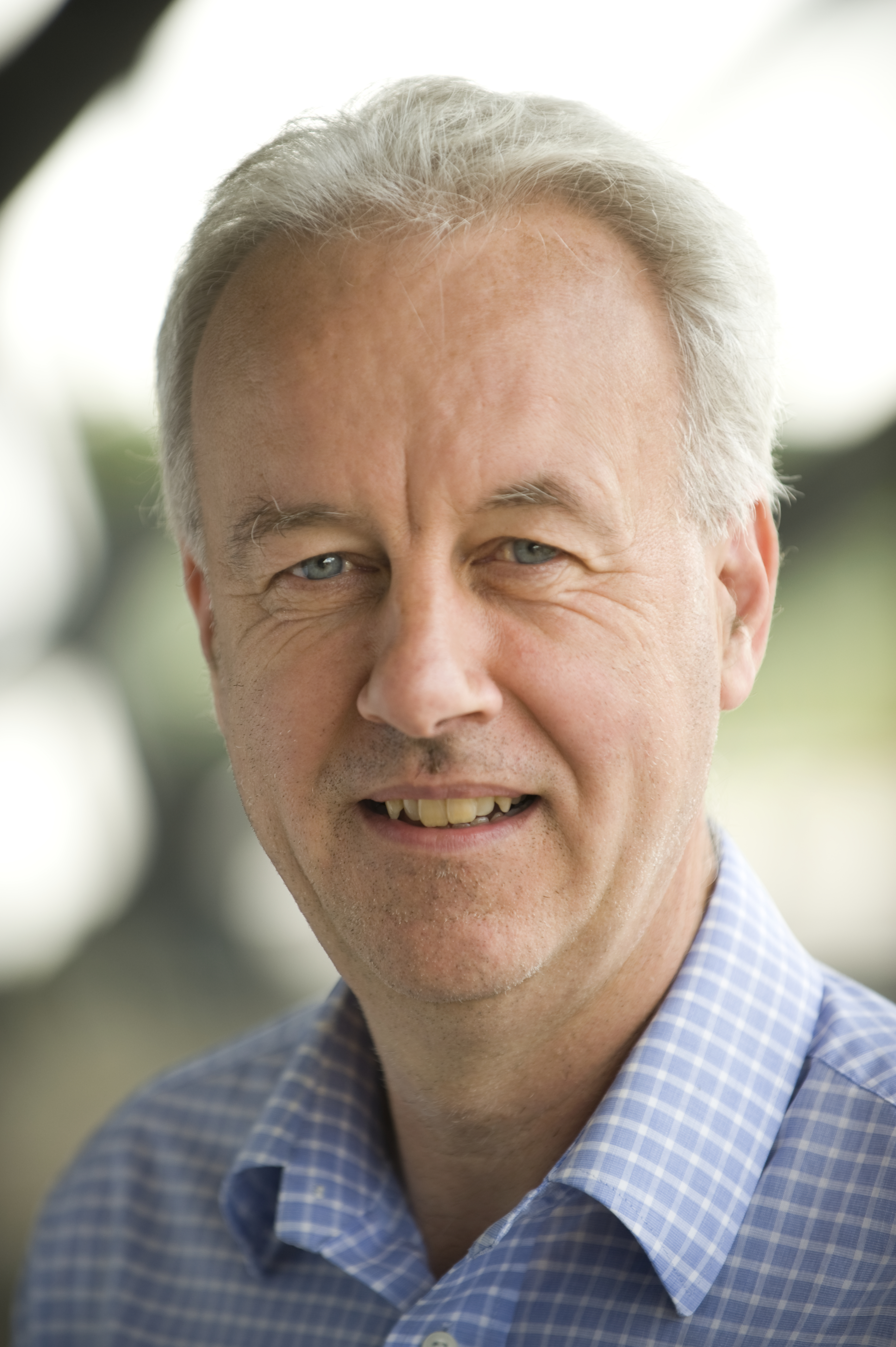
- Gordon Dougan in 2009
- Born: Gordon Dougan
- Education: Scunthorpe Grammar School; John Leggott CollegeUniversity of Sussex (BSc, PhD)
- Awards: EMBO Member (2011)
- Scientific career
- Workplaces: Wellcome Sanger Institute; Trinity College, Dublin; Imperial College London; University of Cambridge; University of Washington
- Thesis: An Analysis of the Structure and Function of Plasmid Cole 1 (1977)
- Doctoral advisor: David Sherratt
- Doctoral students: Mark Pallen; Kat Holt
- Website: www.sanger.ac.uk/person/dougan-gordon/

Gordon Dougan CBE is a professor in the Department of Medicine at the University of Cambridge and head of pathogen research and a member of the board of management at the Wellcome Sanger Institute in Cambridge, United Kingdom. He is also a Fellow of Wolfson College, Cambridge. During his career, Dougan has pioneered work on enteric diseases and been heavily involved in the movement to improve vaccine usage in developing countries. In this regard he was recently voted as one of the top ten most influential people in the vaccine world by people working in the area.

== Education ==
Dougan grew up on a council estate in Scunthorpe and was educated at Henderson Avenue Junior School, Scunthorpe Grammar School and John Leggott College. He graduated with a degree in Biochemistry and received his PhD, both from the University of Sussex.

== Research and career ==
After his PhD, Dougan completed postdoctoral research at the University of Washington (Seattle) in the laboratory of Professor Stanley Falkow. Dougan's research team studies enteric pathogens with a strong emphasis on basic pathogenic mechanisms and immunology. He has a particular interest in using genomics to study host/pathogens interactions, in particular using Salmonella enterica serovar Typhi, the cause of typhoid. He has extensive experience working both in industry and in academia. Before moving to the WTSI he was the Director of the Centre for Molecular Microbiology and Infection at the Imperial College London and a Professor of Physiological Biochemistry. There he was responsible for securing multimillion-pound funding for a new building in Kensington and providing infrastructure for the science.

Throughout his career Dougan has served as a referee, advisor and consultant for numerous institutions, universities, boards, committees and other organisations. He was a trustee of the International Vaccine Institute in Korea and has worked with other global agencies including the World Health Organization and the Global Alliance for Vaccine and Innovations (now GAVI Alliance).

Dougan was a lecturer in the Moyne Institute in Trinity College, Dublin and then worked for over ten years in industry developing vaccines and novel drugs at the Wellcome Foundation (now GlaxoSmithKline GSK). He has participated in early and late clinical studies on several vaccines and is an expert in vaccinology/pathogenic mechanisms, specialising on the immunology of mucosal vaccines and molecular basis of infection. He has been Chair of the Novartis Vaccines & Diagnostics Scientific Advisory Board and has spun out a number of companies. He has published over 400 research papers, edited several books and has sat on the editorial boards of prestigious journals.

=== Awards and honours ===
Dougan was elected a Fellow of the Royal Society in 2012. His nomination reads:

Gordon Dougan is distinguished through his investigations into how bacteria interact with and stimulate the mucosal surfaces of the body during infection. His work has focused on bacterial pathogens, principally Salmonella Typhi and other enteric bacteria and has exploited genetic manipulation of both the host and pathogen. He has made important contributions to basic studies on the molecular basis of the infection process, genomics and to the development of practical vaccines.

Dougan was elected a member of the European Molecular Biology Organization (EMBO) in 2011. He was elected a Fellow of the Academy of Medical Sciences (FMedSci) in 2002.

== Personal life ==
Dougan is an experienced beekeeper.
