= Nhan Phan-Thien =

- Born: October 31, 1952 (age 73)
- Education: University of Sydney (Ph.D., 1979); University of Sydney (Mech. Eng. 1st Honours, University Medalist, 1975)
- Awards: Australian Academy of Science ASEAN Academy of Engineering and Technology; Centenary Medal; Gordon Bell Prize; Australian Society of Rheology Medal; Edgeworth David Medal Senior Fulbright Scholar
- Scientific career
- Fields: Rheology; Bioengineering; Mechanical Engineering; Materials Science and Engineering
- Workplaces: National University of Singapore

Nhan Phan-Thien, Fellow of the Australian Academy of Science (born October 31, 1952, in AnGiang, Vietnam), is an emeritus professor of mechanical engineering at the National University of Singapore, Singapore, and also a professor at Mekong University, Vinh Long Province, Vietnam. He was an associate editor of Physics of Fluids (2016–25) and served as a Deputy Editor (2023–25) for the same journal. He is currently a Founding Deputy Editor for the journals Transport Phenomena and Open Transport (2023–), and serves as an editorial board member of the Journal of Non-Newtonian Fluid Mechanics. He held a Personal Chair at University of Sydney [1991-02] and head of the Mechanical Engineering Department National University of Singapore [2016–19]. His contribution to the rheology field includes the PTT (Phan-Thien – Tanner) model for viscoelastic fluid and its variant. He is the author and co-author of several books in rheology.

== Education ==
Phan-Thien graduated from the University of Sydney, Sydney Australia, with a BEng (Mech. Eng. 1st Honours, University Medalist, 1975). He later completed a PhD degree at the University of Sydney, the Department of Mechanical Engineering in 1979.

== Career ==
He has been a faculty member in mechanical engineering at University of Newcastle (Australia) (1978–80) and at the University of Sydney, Sydney, Australia (1980–02). At the University of Sydney, he held a personal chair (1991–02). He was a professor of mechanical engineering at the National University of Singapore, Singapore (2000–04, 2011–present). He was the founding chair in Bio-Engineering Division, which later becomes known as Biomedical Engineering Department at the National University of Singapore. He has held visiting professorships in Los Alamos National Laboratory, New Mexico, US, Caltech, California, US, and Stanford University, California, US, a Qiushi Chair Professor at Zhejiang University, Hangzhou, China, an adjunct professor at the University of Southern Queensland, Queensland, Australia, and an honorary professor at the University of Sydney, Sydney, Australia.

== Research ==
Phan-Thien and his group have published extensively on the rheology of polymeric liquids, computational and constitutive modelling.

== Honours and awards ==
- Professor, Mekong University (MKU), Vinh Long Province (2025–);
- Qiushi Chair Professor, Zhejiang University (2018–21);
- Fellow of the ASEAN Academy of Engineering and Technology (elected 2016);
- Fellow of the Australian Academy of Science (elected 1999);
- Centenary Medal, awarded by the Governor General of Australia for services to Australian society and science in mechanical engineering (2001);
- Gordon Bell Prize, Price-Performance category, IEEE Computer Society (1997);
- Australian Society of Rheology Medal, awarded by the Australian Society of Rheology for distinguished contributions to Rheology (1997);
- Edgeworth David Medal, awarded by the Royal Society of New South Wales, for distinguished research in science amongst younger workers in Applied Mechanics (1982);
- Senior Fulbright Scholar (1982–83), California Institute of Technology, California, USA.

== Books ==
- Spectral Graph Theory of Polymer Dynamics (Lecture Notes in Applied and Computational Mechanics (LNACM), volume 107), ISBN 978-981-92-6826-9, Springer, 2027,
- Langevin Analysis of Microstructured Fluids (SpringerBriefs in Applied Sciences and Technology), ISBN 978-981-95-2317-7, Springer, 2026,
- Understanding Viscoelasticity: Basics of Rheology (Advanced Texts in Physics), ISBN 978-3540433958, Springer; 1st Edition 2002, 2nd Edition 2008,
- Understanding Viscoelasticity: An Introduction to Rheology (Graduate Texts in Physics), ISBN 978-3319619996, 3rd Edition with Nam Mai-Duy 2017, Springer,
- Understanding Viscoelasticity: An Introduction to Rheology (Graduate Texts in Physics), ISBN 978-3642329579, 2nd Edition 2013, Springer,
- Microstructures in Elastic Media: Principles and Computational Methods, ISBN 978-0195090864, 1st Edition with Sangtae Kim 1994, Oxford University Press,
- Numerical Study on Some Rheological Problems of Fibre Suspensions: Numerical Simulations of Fibre Suspensions, ISBN 978-3836476867, with Xijun Fan and Roger I. Tanner 2008, VDM Verlag Dr. Müller.
