= Andrew Cockburn (ornithologist) =

Australian ornithologist (born 1954)

Emeritus Professor Andrew Cockburn FAA
- Born: 13 September 1954 (age 71)
- Education: Monash University
- Known for: Evolution of bird mating and parental care systems. Evolution of mammal and bird life histories.
- Scientific career
- Fields: Zoology, evolutionary ecology, animal behaviour
- Theses: The ecology of the genus Pseudomys in Victorian heath communities (Honours, 1975); The ecology of Pseudomys spp. in south-eastern Australia. (PhD, 1979)
- Doctoral advisor: Anthony K. Lee
- Notable students: Raoul Mulder, Penny Olsen

Andrew Cockburn FAA is an Australian evolutionary biologist who has been based at the Australian National University in Canberra since 1983. He has worked and published extensively on the breeding behaviour of antechinuses and superb fairy-wrens, and more generally on the biology of marsupials and cooperative breeding in birds. His work on fairy-wrens is based around a detailed long-term study of their curious mating and social system at the Australian National Botanic Gardens.

In 2001, Cockburn was elected a Fellow of the Australian Academy of Science (FAA) and awarded the Centenary Medal. He was awarded the academy's Gottschalk Medal in 1988 and the Edgeworth David Medal of the Royal Society of New South Wales in 1987. In 2004, Cockburn was awarded the Royal Australasian Ornithologists Union's D.L. Serventy Medal, which recognises excellence in published work on birds in the Australasian region. In 2010, he was awarded the Ellis Troughton Medal and Fellowship of the Australian Mammal Society for his research on Australian mammals. In 2012, he gave the Tinbergen Lecture of the Association for the Study of Animal Behaviour. Since 2014, he has been emeritus professor of evolutionary ecology and natural history in the Research School of Biology at the Australian National University.
