= David Headley Green =

Australian geologist (1936–2024)

David Headley Green AM FAA FRS
- Born: 29 February 1936; Launceston, Tasmania, Australia
- Died: 6 September 2024 (aged 88); Hobart, Tasmania, Australia
- Education: University of Tasmania (BSc (1957), MSc (1960), DSc (1988), D Litt (Hons) 1994; University of Cambridge (PhD, 1962)
- Known for: Genesis of basaltic magmas
- Awards: Royal Society of Tasmania Medal; Abraham Gottlieb Werner Medal; Jaeger Medal; Murchison Medal; IMA Medal; RM Johnston Memorial Medal
- Scientific career
- Fields: Experimental petrology
- Workplaces: Australian National University; University of Tasmania
- Thesis: The Petrogenesis of the Ultramafic Rocks (1962)
- Doctoral advisor: Cecil Edgar Tilley

David Headley Green AM FAA FRS (29 February 1936 – 6 September 2024) was an Australian geologist and experimental petrologist who studied Earth's mantle, and the formation of magmas. He was director of the Australian National University research school of earth sciences from 1994 to 2001, and received many senior medals and awards for his work. He was appointed a Member of the Order of Australia in 2006.

== Early life ==
Green was born in Launceston, Tasmania, on 29 February 1936. He went to school at Burnie and Hobart High School, before going to university at the University of Tasmania, in Hobart.

== Education ==
Green completed a BSc at the University of Tasmania in 1957. He then began work as a geologist with the Australian Bureau of Mineral Resources, mapping and studying sequences of igneous rocks in north Queensland and Papua New Guinea from 1957 to 1959. He was awarded an MSc from the University of Tasmania in 1960, and DSc in 1988. In 1958, he was awarded an 1851 Exhibition overseas scholarship, and went to the University of Cambridge. There, he completed a PhD in 1962 with a study of the ultramafic rocks of the Lizard peninsula in Cornwall, under the supervision of petrologist C.E. Tilley.

== Career ==
Green took up a research fellowship at the Australian National University (ANU) in 1962, and was subsequently a fellow and senior fellow until 1976. He held the post of visiting professor at Caltech in 1975, and then moved to take up the post of professor of geology at the University of Tasmania (UTAS) in 1977. In 1994, he returned to the ANU Research School of Earth Sciences as director. He retired in 2001.

== Research ==
Green was an experimental petrologist, and investigated the behaviour of rocks and minerals at high pressures and temperatures in the laboratory. For much of his early career he worked closely with geophysicist and geochemist Ted Ringwood, also at ANU, and they wrote a series of influential papers on the origins of basaltic magmas, on the transformation of rocks from basalt to gabbro to eclogite, and on the nature of the upper mantle.

In 2008, when Green was aged 72, a number of his former students, colleagues and collaborators published a collected volume of research papers 'in honour of the work of David Headley Green on the occasion of his 18th birthday, 29 February 2008'; a reference to his leap year birthday. Green was co-author on three of these papers, which were his 207th to 209th publications.

== Selected works ==
Green published more than 220 papers over the course of his research career. Selected papers are listed below.

- Green, D.H.; Ringwood, A.E. (1963). "Mineral assemblages in a model mantle composition". Journal of Geophysical Research. 68 (3): 937–45. Bibcode:1963JGR....68..937G. doi:10.1029/JZ068i003p00937.
- Green, D.H. (1964). "The metamorphic aureole of the peridotite at the Lizard, Cornwall". Journal of Geology. 72 (5): 543–563. Bibcode:1964JG.....72..543G. doi:10.1086/627013.
- Green, D.H. (1964). "The petrogenesis of the high-temperature peridotite intrusion in the Lizard area, Cornwall". Journal of Petrology. 5: 134–188. doi:10.1093/petrology/5.1.134.
- Green, D.H.; Ringwood, A.E. (1964). "Fractionation of basalt magmas at high pressures". Nature. 201 (4926): 1276–1279. Bibcode:1964Natur.201.1276G. doi:10.1038/2011276a0.
- Green, D.H.; Ringwood, A.E. (1967). "An experimental investigation of the gabbro to eclogite transformation and its petrological applications". Geochimica et Cosmochimica Acta. 31 (5): 767–833. Bibcode:1967GeCoA..31..767G. doi:10.1016/S0016-7037(67)80031-0.
- Green, D.H.; Ringwood, A.E. (1967). "The genesis of basaltic magmas". Contributions to Mineralogy and Petrology. 15 (2): 103–190. Bibcode:1967CoMP...15..103G. doi:10.1007/BF00372052.

== Awards ==
Green received many awards and medals over the course of his career, including

- 1967 Edgeworth David Medal. Royal Society of New South Wales
- 1977 F. L. Stillwell Medal. Geological Society of Australia
- 1982 Mawson Medal and Lecture. Australian Academy of Science
- 1990 Jaeger Medal. Australian Academy of Science
- 1993 Royal Society of Tasmania Medal
- 1998 Abraham Gottlieb Werner Medal. Deutsche Mineralogische Gesellschaft
- 2000 Murchison Medal. Geological Society of London
- 2007 International Gold Medal. Geological Society of Japan
- 2011 IMA Medal for excellence in mineralogical research
- 2016 RM Johnston Memorial Medal, Royal Society of Tasmania

Green was elected a Fellow of the Royal Society in 1991, in recognition of his work on the 'origin of magmas and the nature of Earth and Moon interiors'. He was the third UTAS graduate to be elected to the Royal Society.

He was appointed Member of the Order of Australia (AM) for 'service to the earth sciences' in 2006. Green was recognised with honorary fellowships from national and international academies and societies including: Mineralogical Society, London (2004), American Geophysical Union (2004) and the Geological Society of Australia (2008). Green was awarded an honorary doctorate of letters, D Litt (Hons), by the University of Tasmania in 1994.

== Family ==
Green was married to Helen for 65 years. Helen died in May 2024. Green died on 6 September 2024 in Hobart. They had 6 children.
