= Marilyn Renfree =

Australian zoologist

Marilyn Renfree AO FAA FRS
- Born: 19 April 1947 (age 79); Brisbane, Queensland, Australia
- Education: Australian National University
- Known for: Research on marsupial foetal development
- Scientific career
- Fields: Zoology
- Workplaces: University of Melbourne
- Thesis: Embryo-maternal relationships in the tammar wallaby, macropus eugenii (1972)

Marilyn Bernice Renfree AO FAA FRS (born 19 April 1947) is an Australian zoologist. She completed her PhD at the Australian National University, was a post-doctoral fellow in Tennessee and then Edinburgh before returning to Australia. Since 1991, Renfree has been Professor of Zoology at the University of Melbourne. Her main research interest focuses on reproductive and developmental biology of marsupials.

== Early life ==
Marilyn Renfree was born in Brisbane, Queensland but moved to Canberra where her father was appointed Commonwealth Crown Solicitor. Renfree went to Canberra Girls' Grammar School where she studied French, German, English, geography, maths and biology.

Renfree then studied biology at the Australian National University. The subjects she loved the most were biochemistry and reproduction and development. She chose to do her Honours degree to be involved in both biochemistry and fieldwork which, in those days, was seen as unusual. Renfree's Honours degree was about studying the composition of foetal fluids of the tammar wallaby. To do so, she had to invent a new way to catch female tammars on Kangaroo Island, to get enough individuals to work on.

== Research career ==
She started her PhD project by studying all aspects of maternal-foetal interactions in marsupials. As part as her research, she showed that it was possible to reactivate embryos that were in embryonic diapause (a state of suspended animation) and carry them to full term by giving progesterone injections. She also showed that marsupials have a functional placenta which produces hormones. Moreover, Renfree showed that, like in any mammal, marsupial placenta regulates precisely what goes from mother to foetus. Renfree also proved that, during pregnancy, the two uteri of kangaroos and wallabies behave differently, the gravid one becoming larger than the non-pregnant one due to the presence or absence of the embryo. This was Renfree's first paper and it was published in Nature.

In March 1972, Renfree finished her PhD, worked for six months in Zoology at ANU and then moved to the University of Tennessee to work with Joe Daniel. The project was funded by NIH to study uterine proteins and the influence of melatonin on uterine secretions. While working there, Renfree also started a project on the endocrinology of opossums. To get possums for this work, she advertised in the local newspaper and soon became known as the "possum lady from Australia".

Renfree then moved to the University of Edinburgh, to learn about genetics in Anne McLaren's lab. She worked on foetal fluids in mice, repeating what she had previously done in with tammar wallabies.

Renfree moved back to Australia to take up a lecturer position in vertebrate biology at Murdoch University, Perth, WA in 1973. Renfree established a colony of tammars at Murdoch University and also started working on agile wallabies, studying them to understand how lactation is controlled in marsupials. She also started working on honey possums, in collaboration with Ron Wooller.

In January 1982, Renfree married Roger Short and they both moved to Monash University, Melbourne, Victoria where she started her third tammar colony. She received a National Health and Medical Research Council (NHMRC) fellowship and was a Principal Research Fellow for ten years at Monash, working full-time on research.

Her two daughters, Tamsin and Kirsten were born in 1983 and 1986. In collaboration with her husband, Renfree studied the contraceptive effects of breastfeeding, showing that breastfeeding on demand had a very effective contraceptive effect. Renfree, in collaboration with David Parer and Liz Parer-Cook, participated in The Nature of Australia, a series by the Australian Broadcasting Corporation celebrating Australia's bicentenary in 1988. Methods used to film tammars were then used to study the birth process in marsupials. Renfree showed that, as for other mammals, prostaglandin is involved in birth and that, as well as for other mammals, the marsupial baby is capable of modifying maternal physiology at birth.

In 1991, Renfree was appointed Chair of Zoology and Head of Department at Melbourne University, a position she held until 2003. She became a Laureate Professor of the University in 2002, and in 2003 was awarded a Federation Fellowship. In 2011, Renfree was one of the lead researchers on the first kangaroo genome sequencing project Renfree currently serves on the Prime Minister's Science Prizes Committee for Australia.

== Awards ==
Renfree was awarded the Gottschalk Medal in 1980, and the Mueller Medal in 1997. She was elected a Fellow of the Australian Academy of Science in 1997. She was awarded the Gold Conservation Medal of the Zoological Society of San Diego for 2000, the Commonwealth of Australia's Centenary Medal in 2003, and was made an Officer of the Order of Australia (AO) in 2013 "for distinguished service to biology, particularly through leadership in the research into marsupial reproduction, and to the scientific community". In 2019 she was inducted onto the Victorian Honour Roll of Women. In March 2019 Renfree was awarded the Carl G. Hartmann Award by the Society for the Study of Reproduction and in 2020 the Macfarlane Burnet Medal and Lecture by the Australian Academy of Science. She was made a Fellow of the Royal Society in 2021.

== Mentors ==
Renfree has had several mentors during her study years and career. Mrs Nicholson, who was also fondly called Mrs Nick by her students, was Renfree's biology teacher in fourth and fifth grade. Mrs Nicholson was a very important link to science for Renfree, being one of very few Australian female Doctors in Science at that time.

Another link to science was Renfree's sister, Bev, who was Frank Fenner's technician. Bev also worked at the John Curtin School of Medical Research when Renfree worked there for a short time between school and university.

Prof. Amoroso was very supportive of Renfree's work during her PhD and after. Renfree co-authored a paper "Hormones and the evolution of viviparity" with Amoroso in 1979.

== Woman in science ==
Renfree's father didn't expect her or her sister to go to university; he was expecting their brother to go. When Renfree told her father that she wanted to start studying at university, he told her that she had one year to prove what she could do. At the end of her first year, Renfree got a scholarship and supported herself through the rest of her studies. Her father was very pleased and got both very enthusiastic and supportive. While Renfree was doing her PhD, she never told any boy she would meet at a party that she was actually doing a PhD. Saying that she worked in the Zoology Department was simpler. Renfree believes Murdoch University was the first place she met discrimination as a woman in science, being "the wrong sex, the wrong age".
