= Gottschalk Medal =

Australian science award

The Gottschalk Medal is awarded every year by the Australian Academy of Science to recognize outstanding research by Australian scientists under 40 years of age for research in the medical sciences conducted mainly in Australia.

This medal commemorates the work of the late Dr. Alfred Gottschalk, FAA and has been awarded every year since 1979.

== Award winners ==
Year	Winner	Affiliation	Field	Notes
2025	Amy Cain Shom Goel	Macquarie University Peter MacCallum Cancer Centre	Antiobiotics Cancer immunology	
2024	Eric Chow Kristy Short	Monash University University of Queensland	Biomedical Science	
2023	Si Ming Man	Australian National University	Biomedical science	
2022	Alisa Glukhova	Walter and Eliza Hall Institute	Structural Biology	
2021	Francine Marques	Monash University	Cardiology	
2020	Muireann Irish	University of Sydney	Neuroscience	
2019	Laura Mackay	University of Melbourne	Immunology	
2018	Alex Fornito	Monash University	Neuroscience	
2017	K E Holt	University of Melbourne	Biochemistry and Molecular Biology	
2016	O Vucic	University of Sydney		
2015	Peter Czabotar	Walter and Eliza Hall Institute	Structural Biology	
2014	Kieran F. Harvey	Peter MacCallum Cancer Centre	Cancer Research	
2013	Benjamin Kile	Walter and Eliza Hall Institute	Molecular genetics	
2012	Katharina Gaus	University of New South Wales	Immunology	
2011	Stuart Tangye	Garvan Institute of Medical Research	Immunology	
2010	James Whisstock	Monash University	Molecular Biology	
2009	Carola Vinuesa	Australian National University	Immunology	FAA (2015)
2008	Gabrielle Belz	Walter and Eliza Hall Institute	Immunology	
2007	Jamie Rossjohn	Monash University	Crystallography	FAA (2014)
2006	Joel Mackay	University of Sydney	Molecular Biology	
2005	Ricky W Johnstone			
2004	Melissa H Little			
2003	Levon Khachigian			
2002	Merlin Crossley			
2001	Christopher Goodnow			FAA (2002)
2000	David L Vaux			FAA (2003)
1999	Michael W Parker			FAA (2010)
1998	Doug Hilton			FAA (2004)
1997	Peter R Schofield			
1997	Brandon J Wainwright			
1996	David I Cook			FAA (2004)
1995	Mark J Smyth			
1994	Peter J Goadsby			
1993	Alan Cowman		Walter and Eliza Hall Institute	FAA (2001)
1992	P Mark Hogarth			
1991	R Andrew Cuthbertson			
1990	Nick M Gough			
1989	Adrienne Ruth Hardham			FAA (1997)
1988	Andrew Cockburn			FAA (2001)
1987	Jeremy James Burdon			FAA (1996)
1986	Nick A Nicola			FAA (1996)
1985	Rudi Appels			
1984	James Alexander Angus			FAA (1996)
1983	Graham Farquhar			FAA (1988)
1982	John Shine			FAA (1994)
1981	Antony Burgess			FAA (1993)
1980	Marilyn Renfree			FAA (1997)
1979	Christopher R Parish			

== See also ==
- List of medicine awards
