= Katharina Gaus =

German-Australian immunologist (1972–2021)

- Born: 12 July 1972; Ulm, Baden-Württemberg, West Germany
- Died: 3 March 2021 (aged 48); Sydney, New South Wales, Australia
- Spouse: Professor Justin Gooding
- Awards: Elizabeth Blackburn Fellowship, 2013; Gottschalk Medal, 2012
- Scientific career
- Fields: Cell receptors and membrane biology, signal transduction and medical biochemistry

External videos
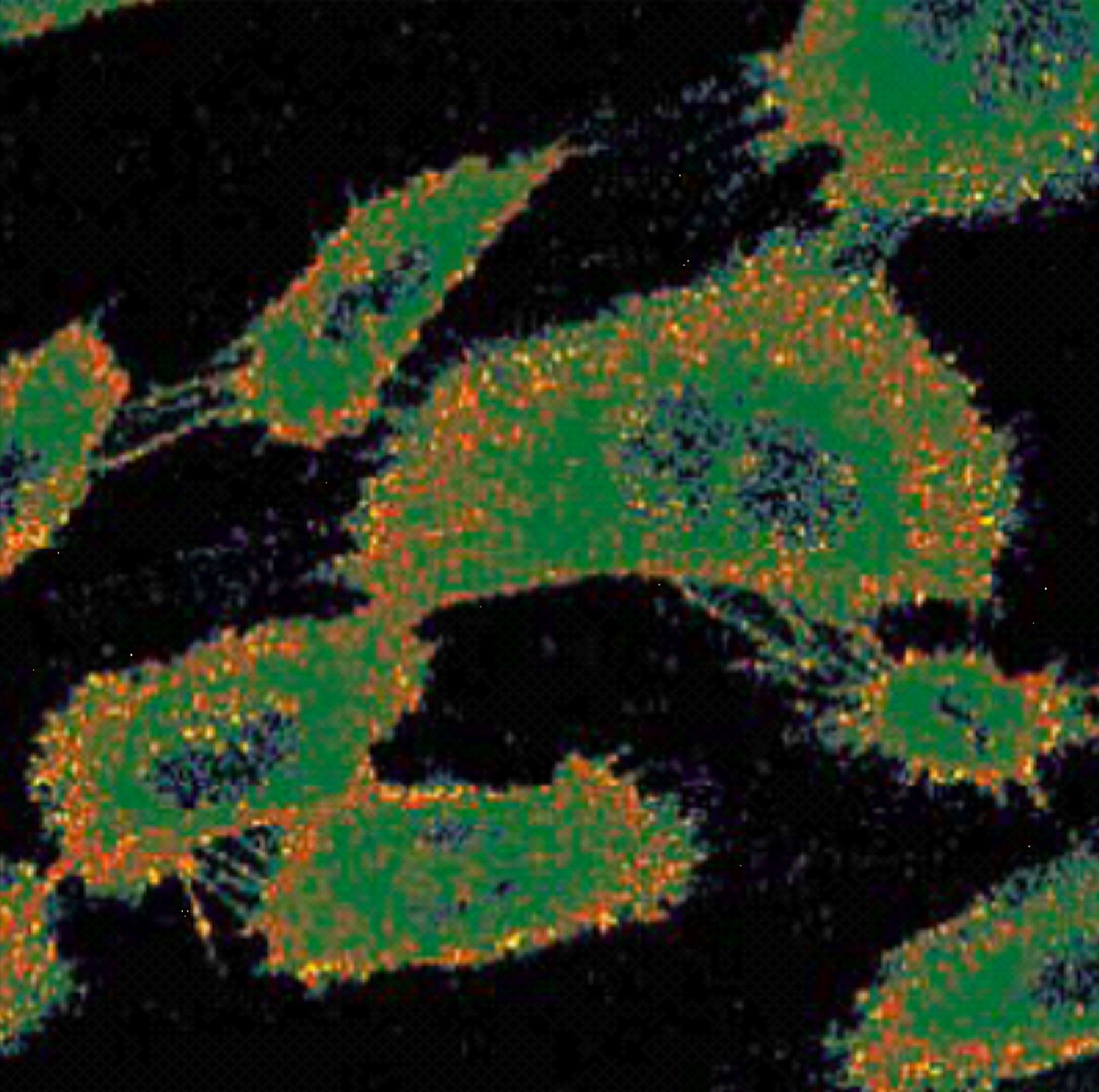
- Katharina Gaus - Extreme Close-up on Immunity, AboutUNSW

Katharina Gaus (12 July 1972 – 3 March 2021) was a German-Australian immunologist and molecular microscopist. She was an NHMRC Senior Research Fellow and founding head of the Cellular Membrane Biology Lab, part of the Centre for Vascular Research at the University of New South Wales. Gaus used new super-resolution fluorescence microscopes to examine the plasma membrane within intact living cells, and study cell signalling at the level of single molecules to better understand how cells "make decisions". A key discovery of Gaus and her team was how T-cells decide to switch on the body's immune system to attack diseases. Her work is of importance to the development of drugs that can work with T-cells in support of the immune system.

== Education ==
Gaus studied physics and mathematics at the University of Heidelberg, Germany and a MPhil (1996) and PhD (1999) from the Institute of Biotechnology at the University of Cambridge. While there she created a biosensor to detect protein-protein interactions and a ligand library, useful as a diagnostic tool.

== Career ==
Following her studies at the University of Cambridge, Katharina joined the Cell Biology Group at the Heart Research Institute in Sydney, Australia, led by Roger Dean and Wendy Jessup. Around 2002, she moved with Wendy Jessup's group to the Centre for Vascular Research at the University of New South Wales.

She received several fellowships, spending three months of 2001 at the University of Illinois at Urbana-Champaign, working with Enrico Gratton before returning to Australia to take up an Australian Research Council postdoctoral fellowship. In 2005 Gaus was awarded an Alexander von Humboldt Research Fellowship and spent six months at the Max Planck Institute for Cell Biology and Genetics in Dresden, Germany, working in the laboratory of Kai Simons.

As of 2005, Gaus founded the Cellular Membrane Biology Lab, part of the Centre for Vascular Research at the University of New South Wales. As of 2009 she became a senior research fellow and associate professor of the National Health and Medical Research Council (NHMRC) in Australia.

Gaus was a member of the Australian Centre for NanoMedicine, founded in 2011, which is based at the University of New South Wales. She was also deputy director and a chief investigator of the ARC Centre of Excellence in Advanced Molecular Imaging.

Gaus was active in encouraging girls to enter scientific fields.

Gaus was elected Fellow of the Australian Academy of Health and Medical Sciences (FAHMS) in 2015.

She died on 3 March 2021 aged 48.

== Awards ==
- 2013, Elizabeth Blackburn Fellowship – Biomedical 2013 (NHMRC Research Excellence Award)
- 2013, NSW Science and Engineering Award for Excellence in Biological Sciences, from the New South Wales Government
- 2012 Gottschalk Medal for outstanding research in the medical sciences, from the Australian Academy of Science
- 2010, Young Investigator Award from the Australia and New Zealand Society for Cell and Developmental Biology
- 2005, Tall Poppy Award, encouraging young Australian scientists
- 2005, ARC Early Researcher Award
