= Francine Marques =

Francine Marques is an Australian medical researcher. A professor of genetics and genomics at Monash University, she is a Sylvia and Charles Viertel Charitable Foundation Fellow, NHMRC Emerging Leader, and a Heart Foundation Future Leader Fellow, known for her work on the effects of gut microbes on high blood pressure.

== Career and research ==
Francine Marques completed her bachelor's degree in Genetics, and Masters in Molecular Biology and Genetics, at the Federal University of Rio Grande do Sul in Brazil. After moving to Australia, she completed her PhD at the University of Sydney in 2012, supported by an Endeavour International Postgraduate Research Scholarship. She established her research laboratory at Monash University in 2018. She was appointed as a Senior Lecturer in 2014, Associate Professor in 2021, and full Professor in 2024. As of 2024, she is a professor at Monash University and a Sylvia and Charles Viertel Charitable Foundation Fellow, NHMRC Emerging Leader, and a Heart Foundation Future Leader Fellow. She is widely recognised for her research on hypertension and the microbiome. Her contributions have enhanced our understanding of the effects of dietary fibre on blood pressure, and how the modulation of bacteria in our gut can improve heart health.

Marques investigates the molecular mechanisms behind the development of high blood pressure, with focus on disease identification, prevention and treatment through manipulation of gut microbes and their metabolites. Her research has shown that a diet reach in fibre is able to lower blood pressure and improve heart function through the modulation of the bacteria in our gut.

== Awards ==
- Finalist for the 2019 3M Eureka Prize for Emerging Leader in Science
- 2019 American Heart Association Hypertension Council Goldblatt Award
- 2020 AIPS Tall Poppy Victorian Award Winner
- 2020 High Blood Pressure Research Council of Australia Jaye Chin-Dusting Mid-Career Award
- 2021 International Society of Hypertension Mid-Career Award for Women
- 2021 Australian Academy of Science Gottschalk Medal
- 2021 Women's Agenda Emerging Leader in STEM
- 2024 Australian Society for Medical Research Peter Doherty Leading Light Award
- 2025 Jian Zhou Medallist, Australian Academy of Health and Medical Sciences

== Selected publications ==
- Marques FZ, Nelson E, Chu PY, Horlock D, Fiedler A, Ziemann M, Tan JK, Kuruppu S, Rajapakse NW, El-Osta A, Mackay CR, Kaye DM. High-Fiber Diet and Acetate Supplementation Change the Gut Microbiota and Prevent the Development of Hypertension and Heart Failure in Hypertensive Mice. Circulation. 2017 Mar 7;135(10):964-977. doi: 10.1161/CIRCULATIONAHA.116.024545. Epub 2016 Dec 7. PMID: 27927713.
- Marques FZ, Mackay CR, Kaye DM. Beyond gut feelings: how the gut microbiota regulates blood pressure. Nature Reviews Cardiology. 2018 Jan;15(1):20-32. doi: 10.1038/nrcardio.2017.120. Epub 2017 Aug 24. PMID: 28836619.
- Kaye DM, Shihata WA, Jama HA, Tsyganov K, Ziemann M, Kiriazis H, Horlock D, Vijay A, Giam B, Vinh A, Johnson C, Fiedler A, Donner D, Snelson M, Coughlan MT, Phillips S, Du XJ, El-Osta A, Drummond G, Lambert GW, Spector TD, Valdes AM, Mackay CR, Marques FZ. Deficiency of Prebiotic Fiber and Insufficient Signaling Through Gut Metabolite-Sensing Receptors Leads to Cardiovascular Disease. Circulation. 2020 Apr 28;141(17):1393-1403. doi: 10.1161/CIRCULATIONAHA.119.043081. Epub 2020 Feb 25. PMID: 32093510.
- Jama HA, Rhys-Jones D, Nakai M, Yao CK, Climie RE, Sata Y, Anderson D, Creek DJ, Head GA, Kaye DM, Mackay CR, Muir J, Marques FZ. Prebiotic intervention with HAMSAB in untreated essential hypertensive patients assessed in a phase II randomized trial. Nature Cardiovascular Research. 2023 Jan;2(1):35-43. doi: 10.1038/s44161-022-00197-4. Epub 2023 Jan 9. PMID: 39196205.
- O'Donnell JA, Zheng T, Meric G, Marques FZ. The gut microbiome and hypertension. Nat Rev Nephrol. 2023 Mar;19(3):153-167. doi: 10.1038/s41581-022-00654-0. Epub 2023 Jan 11. PMID 36631562.
- Marques FZ. Rethinking Culture to Unlock the Potential of Medical Research. Hypertension. 2024 Jan;81(1):110-113. doi: 10.1161/HYPERTENSIONAHA.123.22321. Epub 2023 Nov 22. PMID: 37990913.
- Chapman N, Thomas EE, Tan JTM, Inglis SC, Wu JHY, Climie RE, Picone DS, Blekkenhorst LC, Wise SG, Mirabito Colafella KM, Calkin AC, Marques FZ. A roadmap of strategies to support cardiovascular researchers: from policy to practice. Nature Reviews Cardiology. 2022 Nov;19(11):765-777. doi: 10.1038/s41569-022-00700-1. Epub 2022 May 16. PMID: 35577952.
