= Albert Zomaya =

Computer engineer

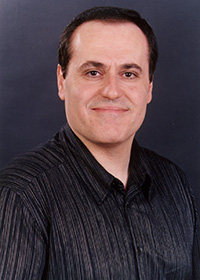

Albert Zomaya
- Fields: Complex Systems, Parallel and Distributed Computing, Green Computing
- Institutions: IEEE, American Association for the Advancement of Science, Institution of Engineering and Technology, Sydney University
- Notable Awards: The IEEE Computer Society's 2014 Technical Achievement Award, IEEE TCPP Outstanding Service and Contributions Award

Albert Y. Zomaya FAA FRSN is currently the Chair Professor of High Performance Computing & Networking and Australian Research Council Professorial Fellow in the School of Information Technologies, The University of Sydney. He is also the director of the Centre for Distributed and High Performance Computing. He is currently the Editor in Chief of IEEE Transactions on Sustainable Computing and Springer's Scalable Computing and Communications. He was past Editor in Chief of the IEEE Transactions on Computers.

== Biography and education ==
Zomaya, an ethnic Assyrian, received his B.S. degree (1987) from Kuwait University in Electrical Engineering and PhD degree (1990) in Control Engineering from Sheffield University, United Kingdom.

== Career ==
Zomaya held the CISCO Systems Chair Professor of Internetworking during the period 2002–2007 and also was head of school for 2006–2007 in the same school. Prior to his current appointment, he was a full professor in the School of Electrical, Electronic and Computer Engineering at the University of Western Australia, where he also led the Parallel Computing Research Laboratory during the period 1990–2002. He served as associate head, deputy head, and acting head in the same department, and held numerous visiting positions and has extensive industry involvement. Zomaya received his PhD from the Department of Automatic Control and Systems Engineering, Sheffield University in the United Kingdom.

Zomaya published more than 1000 scientific papers and articles and is author, co-author or editor of more than 20 books. He is currently the editor in chief of IEEE Transactions on Sustainable Computing and Springer's Scalable Computing and Communications and serves as an associate editor for 22 leading journals. He was editor in chief of IEEE Transactions on Computers. Zomaya is the founding editor of the Wiley Book Series on Parallel and Distributed Computing.

== Honors ==
Zomaya is an IEEE Fellow, AAAS Fellow, a Institution of Engineering and Technology Fellow, an ACM Distinguished Engineer and a Chartered Engineer (CEng). He received the 1997 Edgeworth David Medal by the Royal Society of New South Wales for outstanding contributions to Australian Science. He is the recipient of the IEEE Technical Committee on Parallel Processing Outstanding Service Award (2011), the IEEE Technical Committee on Scalable Computing Medal for Excellence in Scalable Computing (2011), and the IEEE Computer Society Technical Achievement Award (2014). His research interests are in the areas of complex systems, parallel and distributed computing, and green computing. In 2019 he was awarded the NSW Premier's Prize for "Excellence in Engineering or Information and Communications Technology". In 2020 he was elected a Fellow of the Royal Society of New South Wales, while in 2022 he became a Fellow of the Australian Academy of Science.

== Editing career and conferences ==
Professor Zomaya is the editor in chief of the IEEE Transactions on Sustainable Computing, the founding editor in chief of the Springer's Scalable Computing and Communications Journal, and serves as an associate editor for another 20 journals including, ACM Computing Surveys, IEEE Transactions on Cloud Computing, and IEEE Transactions on Computational Social Systems. He was past Editor in Chief of the IEEE Transactions on Computers.

== Books ==
Professor Zomaya is the author/co-author of more than 450 publications. . He has several books to his name:

1. Elloumi, M. and Zomaya, A.Y., 2013, 'Biological Knowledge Discovery Handbook: Preprocessing, Mining and Postprocessing of Biological Data', Wiley, New Jersey.
2. Khan, S.U., Wang, L. and Zomaya, A.Y., 2013, 'Scalable Computing and Communications: Theory and Practice', Wiley, New Jersey.
3. Sarbazi-Azad, H. and Zomaya, A.Y., 2013, 'Large Scale Network Centric Distributed Systems', Wiley, New Jersey.
4. Khan, S.U., Kolodziej, J., Li, J. and Zomaya, A.Y., 2013, 'Evolutionary Based Solutions for Green Computing', Springer-Verlag, New York.
5. Zomaya, A.Y. and Lee, Y.C., 2012, 'Energy Efficient Distributed Computing Systems', Wiley, New Jersey.
6. Elloumi, M. and Zomaya, A.Y., 2011, 'Algorithms in Computational Molecular Biology', Wiley, New Jersey.
7. Tabli, E. and Zomaya, A.Y., 2008, 'Grid Computing for Bioinformatics and Computational Biology', Wiley, New Jersey.
8. Salleh, S., Zomaya, A.Y., and Abu Bakar, S., 2008, 'Computing for Numerical Methods Using Visual C++', Wiley, New Jersey.
9. Zomaya, A.Y., 2006, 'Parallel Computing for Bioinformatics and Computational Biology: Models, Enabling Technologies and Case Studies', Wiley, New York.
10. Zomaya, A.Y., 2006, 'Handbook of Nature–Inspired and Innovative Computing: Integrating Classical Models with Emerging Technologies', Springer–Verlag, New York.
11. Olariu, S. and Zomaya, A.Y., 2006, 'Handbook of Bioinspired Algorithms and Applications', Chapman&Hall/CRC Press, Boca Raton, Florida.
12. Diab, B. H. and Zomaya, A.Y., 2005, 'Dependable Computing Systems: Paradigms, Performance Issues and Applications', Wiley, New York.
13. Salleh, S., Zomaya, A.Y., Olariu, S., and Sanugi, B., 2005, 'Numerical Simulations and Case Studies Using Visual C++.Net', Wiley, New Jersey.
14. Zomaya, A.Y., Ercal, F., and Olariu, S., 2001, 'Solutions to Parallel and Distributed Computing Problems: Lessons from Biological Sciences', Wiley, New York.
15. Fox, B., Jennings, L., and Zomaya, A.Y., 2000, 'Constrained Dynamics Computations: Models and Case Studies', World Scientific Publishing, London.
16. Salleh, S. and Zomaya, A.Y., 1999, 'Scheduling In Parallel Computing Systems: Fuzzy and Annealing Techniques', Kluwer Academic Publishers, USA.
17. Gill, M.C. and Zomaya, A.Y., 1998, 'Obstacle Avoidance in Multi–Robot Systems: Experiments in Parallel Genetic Algorithms', World Scientific Publishing, London.
18. Mills, P.M., Zomaya, A.Y., and Tade, M.O., 1996, 'Neuro–Adaptive Process Control: A Practical Approach', Wiley, United Kingdom, (with software).
19. Zomaya, A.Y., 1996, 'Parallel and Distributed Computing Handbook', McGraw–Hill, New York.
20. Zomaya, A.Y., 1996, 'Parallel Computing: Paradigms and Applications', International Thomoson Computer Press, London, United Kingdom.
21. Zomaya, A.Y., 1992, 'Modelling and Simulation of Robot Manipulators: A Parallel-Processing Approach, (World Scientific Series in Robotics and Automated Systems)', World Scientific Publishing, Singapore.

== Selected awards and honours ==
- The IEEE Computer Society’s 2014 Technical Achievement Award, the citation reads “For outstanding contributions to the solution of scheduling problems in parallel and distributed computing systems”.
- IEEE TCPP Outstanding Service and Contributions Award, the award recognises an individual (or a group of individuals) in the broader community who have made major professional service contribution to the parallel processing community. The award is sponsored by the IEEE Technical Committee on Parallel Processing (2011)
- IEEE TCSC Medal of Excellence in Scalable Computing, the award recognises an individual who made significant and sustained contributions to the scalable computing community through the IEEE Technical Committee on Scalable Computing (TCSC), coupled with an outstanding record of high quality and high impact research (2011) (citation: For Significant Contributions through research, publications, software, systems, and board service)
- Golden Core Recognition, IEEE Computer Society, IEEE, USA (2006)
- Fellow of the American Association for the Advancement of Science (AAAS) for ‘distinguished contributions to the development of scheduling techniques for parallel and distributed computing and the design of parallel algorithms’ (2006)
- Distinguished Engineer, The Association for Computing Machinery (ACM). The Distinguished Engineer Grade recognises those ACM members with at least 15 years of professional experience and five years of continuous Professional Membership who have achieved significant accomplishments or have made a significant impact on the computing field (2006)
- Fellow of the Institute of Electrical and Electronics Engineers (IEEE) for ‘contributions to the solution of scheduling problems in parallel computing systems’ (2004)
- Fellow of the Institution of Engineering and Technology (previously known as the Institution of Electrical Engineers–IEE), United Kingdom (2001)
- Meritorious Service Award, IEEE Computer Society (2000)
- Edgeworth David Medal, Royal Society of New South Wales, Australia, for ‘distinguished contributions to Australian science by a scientist under the age of 35’ (1998)
