= Edgeworth David Medal =

Award for young scientists in Australia

The Edgeworth David Medal is awarded annually by the Royal Society of New South Wales for distinguished contributions by a young scientist under the age of 35 years for work done predominantly in Australia or which contributed to the advancement of Australian science.

It was first awarded in 1949 and is named after the pioneering geologist Sir Edgeworth David, FRS.

== Recipients ==
Source: RSNSW

| Year | Laureates | Discipline |
|---|---|---|
| 1948 | Ronald Gordon Giovanelli; E. Ritchie | Astrophysics; Organic Chemistry |
| 1949 | Temple B. Kiely | Plant Pathology |
| 1950 | Ronald Murray Berndt & Catherine H. Berndt | Anthropology |
| 1951 | John Gatenby Bolton | Radio Astronomy |
| 1952 | Alan Buchanan Wardrop | Botany |
| 1954 | Eric Stephen Barnes | Mathematics |
| 1955 | Hugh Bryan Spencer Womersley | Botany |
| 1956 | John Maxwell Cowley | Chemical Physics |
| 1957 | John Maxwell Cowley; John Paul Wild | Chemical Physics; Radio Astronomy |
| 1958 | Paul Ivan Korner | Physiology |
| 1960 | Ronald Drayton Brown | Chemistry |
| 1961 | Ralph Owen Slatyer | Climatology |
| 1962 | Ray F. Isbell | Soil Science |
| 1963 | Neville Horner Fletcher | Physics |
| 1964 | Mollie Elizabeth Holman | Physiology |
| 1965 | John L. Dillon | Agricultural Economics |
| 1966 | Roger Ian Tanner | Mechanical Engineering |
| 1967 | David Headley Green; William James Peacock | Geology; Botany |
| 1968 | Robert McCredie May | Physics |
| 1969 | Barry W. Ninham | Physics |
| 1970 | A. David Buckingham | Inorganic Chemistry |
| 1971 | William Francis Budd | Glaciology |
| 1972 | Donald Harold Napper; J. Stone | Physical Chemistry; Physiology |
| 1973 | Charles Barry Osmond | Plant Biology |
| 1974 | Allan Whitenack Snyder | Physics |
| 1975 | F. John Ballard | Biochemistry |
| 1976 | Ross Howard Street | Mathematics |
| 1977 | Robert Anthony Antonia | Mechanical Engineering |
| 1978 | T.W. Cole; Michael G. Clark | Astronomy; Physiology |
| 1979 | Graham Clifford Goodwin | Electrical Engineering |
| 1980 | Michael Anthony Etheridge | Geology |
| 1981 | Martin Andrew Green | Applied Physics |
| 1982 | Nhan Phan-Thien | Mechanics |
| 1983 | Denis Wakefield | Ocular Immunology |
| 1984 | Alan James Husband | Pathology |
| 1985 | Simon Charles Gandevia; Brian James Morris | Clinical Neurophysiology; Molecular Biology |
| 1986 | Leslie David Field; Peter Gavin Hall | Chemistry; Statistics |
| 1987 | Andrew Cockburn | Zoology |
| 1988 | Peter Andrew Lay | Inorganic Chemistry |
| 1989 | Trevor William Hambley | Chemistry |
| 1990 | Timothy Fridjof Flannery | Taxonomy & Phylogeny – Macropodidea |
| 1991 | Mark Harvey | Taxonomy – Invertebrates |
| 1992 | Peter James Goadsby; Keith Alexander Nugent | Neurophysiology; Optics |
| 1993 | John Skerritt | Agriculture (Genetics) |
| 1994 | Richard Hume Middleton | Electrical Engineering |
| 1995 | Anthony Bruce Murphy | Physics |
| 1996 | Peter Alexander Robinson | Physics |
| 1997 | Albert Zomaya | Mathematics |
| 1998 | Not awarded | |
| 1999 | Merlin Crossley | Molecular Biology |
| 2000 | Michael Coon Yoong Lee | Zoology |
| 2001 | Samantha Richardson | Evolution |
| 2002 | Marcela Bilek | Physics |
| 2003 | Stuart Robert Batten | Chemistry |
| 2004 | Cameron Kepert | Chemistry |
| 2005 | Christopher Barner-Kowollik | Chemistry |
| 2006 | Barry Brook | Environmental Science |
| 2007 | Stuart Wyithe | Astrophysics |
| 2008 | Adam Micolich | Physics |
| 2009 | Nagarajan Valanoor | Materials Science |
| 2010 | Angela Moles | Botany |
| 2011 | Trent Woodruff | Pharmacology |
| 2012 | Joanne Whittaker | Geophysics |
| 2013 | David Wilson | Mathematics and Public Health |
| 2014 | Richard Payne | Chemistry |
| 2015 | Simon Ho | Biology and evolution |
| 2016 | Muireann Irish | Neuroscience |
| 2017 | Angela Nickerson | Psychology |
| 2018 | Elizabeth J. New | Chemistry |
| 2019 | Si Ming Man | Immunology |
| 2020 | Brett Hallam | Photovoltaics |
| 2021 | Lining Arnold Ju | Biomechanics |
| 2022 | Tim S. Doherty | Predator–Prey Dynamics |
| 2023 | Qilin Wang | Wastewater Treatment |

== See also ==
- List of general science and technology awards
- List of awards named after people
