= Serendip Sanctuary =

Nature reserve in Australia

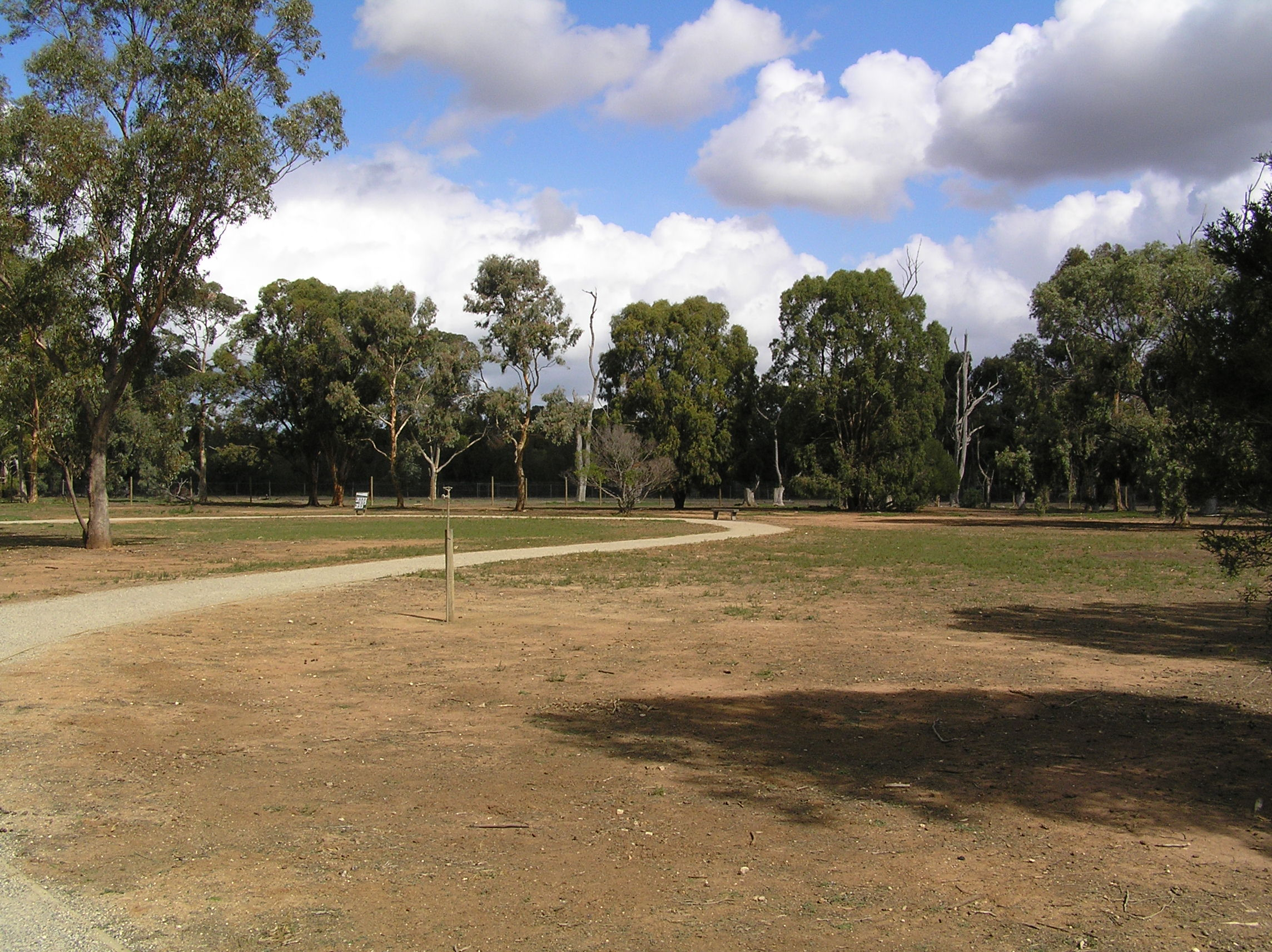
- Serendip Sanctuary Landscape
- Interactive map of Serendip Sanctuary
- Type: Wildlife Park
- Location: Victoria
- Coordinates: 38.003°S 144.409°E
- Area: 250 ha (620 acres)
- Established: 1959
- Owner: State Government of Victoria
- Status: Open
- Terrain: Bushland, grassy woodlands, wetlands
- Vegetation: Australian native plants
- Facilities: Toilets, walking paths, picnic areas, bird hides, flight aviaries, visitors centre, seating and shelters
- Website: Parks Victoria

Serendip Sanctuary is a 250 ha (620 acres) protected area in Victoria, Australia, near the You Yangs and the town of Lara, some 22 km (14 mi) north of Geelong and 60 km (37 mi) south-west of Melbourne. Originally used for farming and other purposes, it was purchased in 1959 by the State Government of Victoria for wildlife research and the captive management and breeding of species threatened in Victoria, such as the brolga, magpie goose, Australian bustard, and bush stone-curlew. The sanctuary contains many different types of wetland and is home to many plant species as well, such as river red gums, tall spikerush, and tussock grass. Serendip now focuses more on environmental education about the flora and fauna of the wetlands and open grassy woodlands of the Volcanic Western Plains of Victoria. It was opened to the public in 1991 and is now managed by Parks Victoria.

== Background and origins ==
Serendip Sanctuary is located in the traditional country of the Wadawurrung people. Wadawurrung country covers over 10,000 km^{2} (3,900 sq mi) from the Great Dividing Range to the South Coast, including the Geelong and Ballarat greater districts. According to the Dreamtime legend, Wadawurrung country was created over 60,000 years ago, when ‘Bunjil’, a wedge-tailed eagle, summoned six men, all who were birds, to help create the land, the people and all living organisms. Bunjil taught the people social laws and rules, and how to respect the land of his creation. Once Bunjil had finished, he gathered his wives and his children, ordering ‘Belin-Belin’, who was in charge of the winds, to release a wind so strong it created the trees and plants. Belin-Belin's final release of wind was so strong it carried Bunjil and his family to the heavens. Bunjil became the star, Altair and his wives became stars on either side of him.

== History ==
The first European settlers arrived in Geelong in 1836, entering Wadawurrung country. The rapid colonisation introduced a wave of disruption on the land, people, animals and culture. Country dispossession, language erasure and cultural nomenclature diminished Wadawurrung culture. The Wadawurrung population began to perish following the introduction of foreign disease including smallpox, plagues, and sexually transmitted diseases that were carried by the European settlers and their animals. Native animals became endangered from the introduction of exotic animals such as rabbits, foxes, and dogs that preyed on traditional animals and food vegetation resources. Wadawurrung culture never recovered from the rapid colonisation and subsequent environmental, health and culture changes, thus diminished their prevalence as a result.

== Facilities ==
Serendip Sanctuary includes facilities for recreational, educational and bird watching purposes. Facilities include:

- Barbecue area
- Toilets
- Walking trails
- Outdoor learning centre
- Classroom
- Picnic area
- Bird hides
- Flight aviaries

== Tourism ==
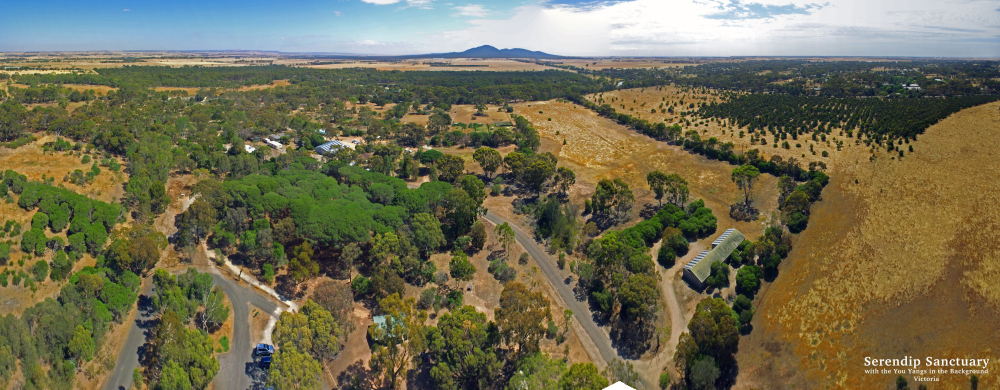
Serendip Sanctuary panorama from the sky

Serendip offers an extensive range of activities for visitors, including bird watching, bushwalks, tours, and the use of recreational areas. There are four interconnecting walking tracks throughout the park for viewing of wildlife. Parks Victoria offers a free Junior Ranger's Program at Serendip, where families with young children can partake in educational park-based activities during school holidays and weekends.

=== Activities ===
==== Bird watching ====
Serendip Sanctuary's most popular tourist activity is bird watching. Serendip is home to over 150 species of native birds, including threatened and endangered species. The sanctuary provides prime bird watching sites for visitors with accessible bird hides and flight aviaries along each trail. The Marshland Bird Hide and Billabong Bird Hide both look out to the marshlands. The Wader Bird Hide looks over the west side of Lake Serendip. The Farm Dam Bird Hides' are located east of the North Arm lake. The flight aviaries are positioned on the Wildlife Walk observing both wetland and dry-land bird species.

==== Wildlife tour ====
Serendip's Wildlife Tours are run generally one Saturday per month, and every Saturday during the Australian summer. The tour is a free and educational-based guided walk on the Wildlife Walk track, focused on habitat and wildlife information about the Western Volcanic Plains. The tour is supervised and run by Serendip Sanctuary's volunteer park guides. The Wildlife Tour takes approximately 1.5 hours to complete.

==== Walks ====
Serendip's Wildlife Walk is their most popular trail for visitors, providing prime viewing and encounters with a large variety of native wildlife. The Wildlife Walk is an easy 1.5 km (0.93 mi) circuit and is suitable for all ages and fitness levels.

Serendip's Wader Walk is a quieter alternative to the Wildlife Walk. The walk has native wildlife viewing opportunities with the Wader bird hide along the track, as well as native Australian bushland views. A return walk on the Wader track is 3 km (1.9 mi) and takes an hour to complete.

==== Junior Rangers Program ====
Parks Victoria runs the Junior Ranger Program at Serendip for young children and students. Junior Rangers is a free program run during school holidays and certain weekends, allowing children to explore Serendip while accompanied by a park ranger. Some of the ranger-guided activities include wetland walks, fire recovery, and various talks to discover and learn about different animals and habitats. The Ranger Program focuses on various essential themes including caring for the environment, exploring ecosystems, habitats, park management, plants and animal facts, fire, tracks and connections between humans and the environment.

== Wildlife protection ==
Serendip is involved with various breeding programs for endangered bird and animal species. The park provides a holding facility for captive breeding and management of the eastern barred bandicoot as part of the National Recovery Plan for the Eastern Barred Bandicoot. Serendip is involved with repopulation of various bird species including the magpie goose, Australian bustard, and the brolga. The park provides a captive breeding program for these bird species to rehabilitate rare or near-extinct birds on the Western Plains.

=== National Recovery Plan For The Eastern Barred Bandicoot ===
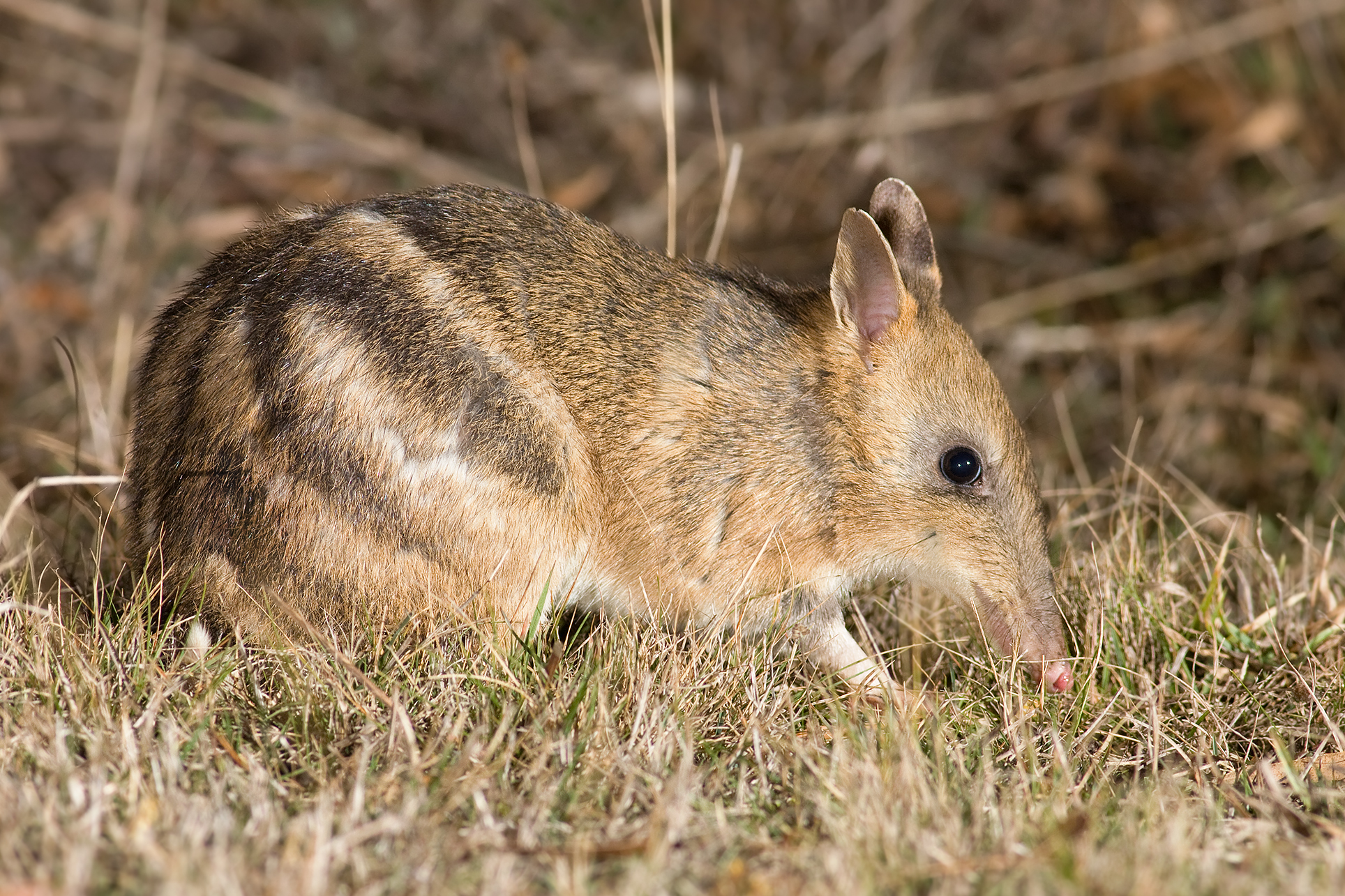
An eastern barred bandicoot photographed in Tasmania

Serendip's participation in the National Recovery Plan for the eastern barred bandicoot aims to minimise the probability of extinction by reintroducing self-sustaining populations. The eastern barred bandicoot (Perameles gunnii) is a small marsupial native to south-eastern Australia, mainly Tasmania and south-western Victoria. The mainland species is recognised as ‘Endangered’ under the Environment Protection and Biodiversity Conservation Act 1999 and ‘Threatened’ under the Victorian Flora and Fauna Guarantee Act 1988. Serendip Sanctuary is an identified holding site for the eastern barred bandicoot captive breeding initiative within the National Recovery Plan to increase their overall captive population. The predominant ecosystems of grassy woodlands and wetlands at Serendip Sanctuary are reflective of the original eastern barred bandicoot habitat, and therefore creating an optimal site for ease of repopulation. Serendip Sanctuary's predator-proof fence is a major contributor to recovery effort, protecting captive and re-introduced populations from foxes as the main predator.

Successful repopulation numbers of the eastern barred bandicoot at Serendip Sanctuary have been used for further research into conservation and breeding patterns. In 2018, a study was conducted at the Werribee Open Range Zoo in Victoria to investigate whether captive breeding programs of the eastern barred bandicoot can improve reproduction numbers by allowing females to choose their male partner for mating. Serendip Sanctuary facilitated the transfer of eastern barred bandicoots for the study and thus contributed to necessary research into correcting and improving captive breeding programs for increased successful repopulation rates.

=== Bush Stone Curlew breeding program ===
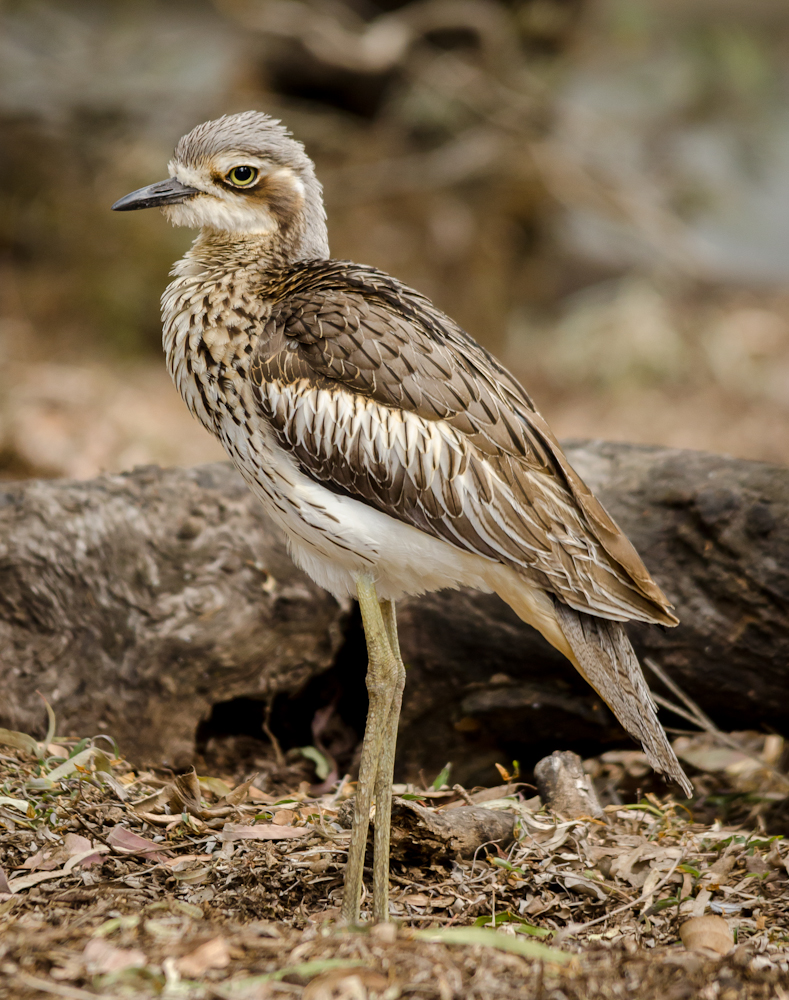
Bush stone-curlew photographed in Brisbane, Australia

Serendip Sanctuary is involved in the repopulation and captive breeding initiatives of the bush stone-curlew (Burhinus grallarius). The bush stone-curlew is considered ‘Near Threatened’ by the International Union for Conservation of Nature. Their declining populations are primarily due to predation by foxes, habitat clearance and destruction. The grassy woodlands and native under-storeys at Serendip Sanctuary are optimal habitat locations for the bush stone-curlew. Captive breeding at Serendip Sanctuary has proven successful, contributing to overall conservation efforts. The captive bred birds are transferred to Mount Rothwell Biodiversity and Interpretation Centre where there is a larger predator-proof environment to continue captive breeding.

=== Cape Barren goose breeding program ===
The Cape Barren goose (Cereopsis novaehollandiae), was part of the first successful bird breeding programs at Serendip Sanctuary. The Cape Barren goose population faced rapid decline in the 1950s, almost close to reaching extinction. Various breeding programs have repopulated Cape Barren goose to a level where they are now considered stable, however their overall population remains one of the rarest geese. Serendip Sanctuary provides an ideal habitat for captive breeding, replicating the Cape Barren goose natural habitat in areas of pasture, tussock grass and low scrub.

=== Magpie geese breeding program ===
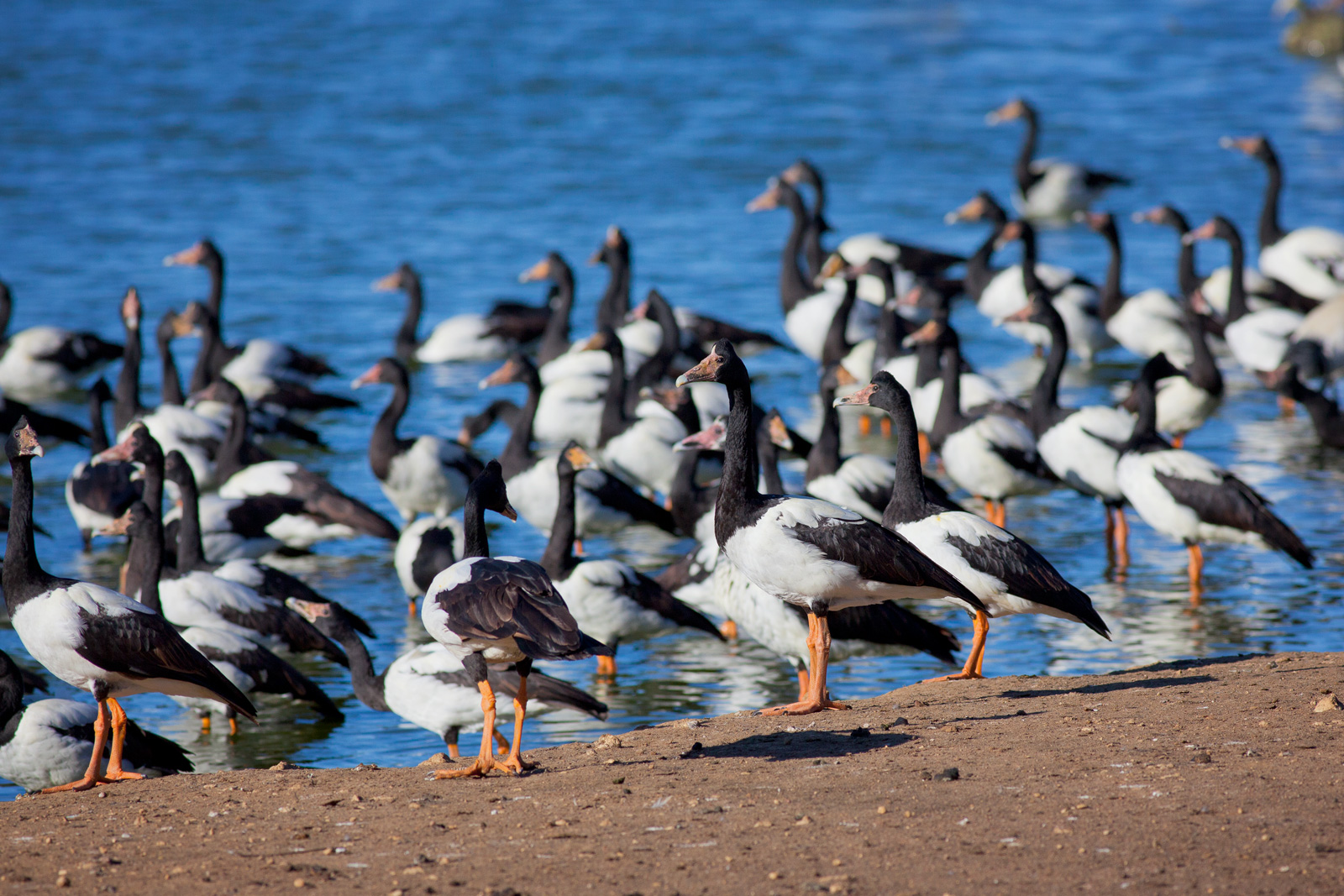
A flock of magpie geese photographed at Serendip Lake

Serendip Sanctuary has been involved in the repopulation and reintroduction of magpie geese (Anseranas semipalmata), in Victoria. In the early 1900s, magpie goose populations had seriously declined primarily from loss of wetland habitats from droughts, hunting and predation by foxes. Magpie geese were reintroduced at several locations in south-east Australia, including Serendip Sanctuary in 1964. 15 adult magpie geese were supplied to Serendip Sanctuary, with 102 additional birds in 1965. The first laying of eggs at Serendip was recorded in 1968 and between 1971 and 1984, 742 Magpie Geese hatched at Serendip and were released to Tower Hill, Kyabram, Phillip Island, Sale, Kerang, and Healesville in Victoria and Bool Lagoon in South Australia. Serendip Sanctuary is one of three consistently active release sites for magpie geese captive breeding.

=== Australian bustard breeding program ===
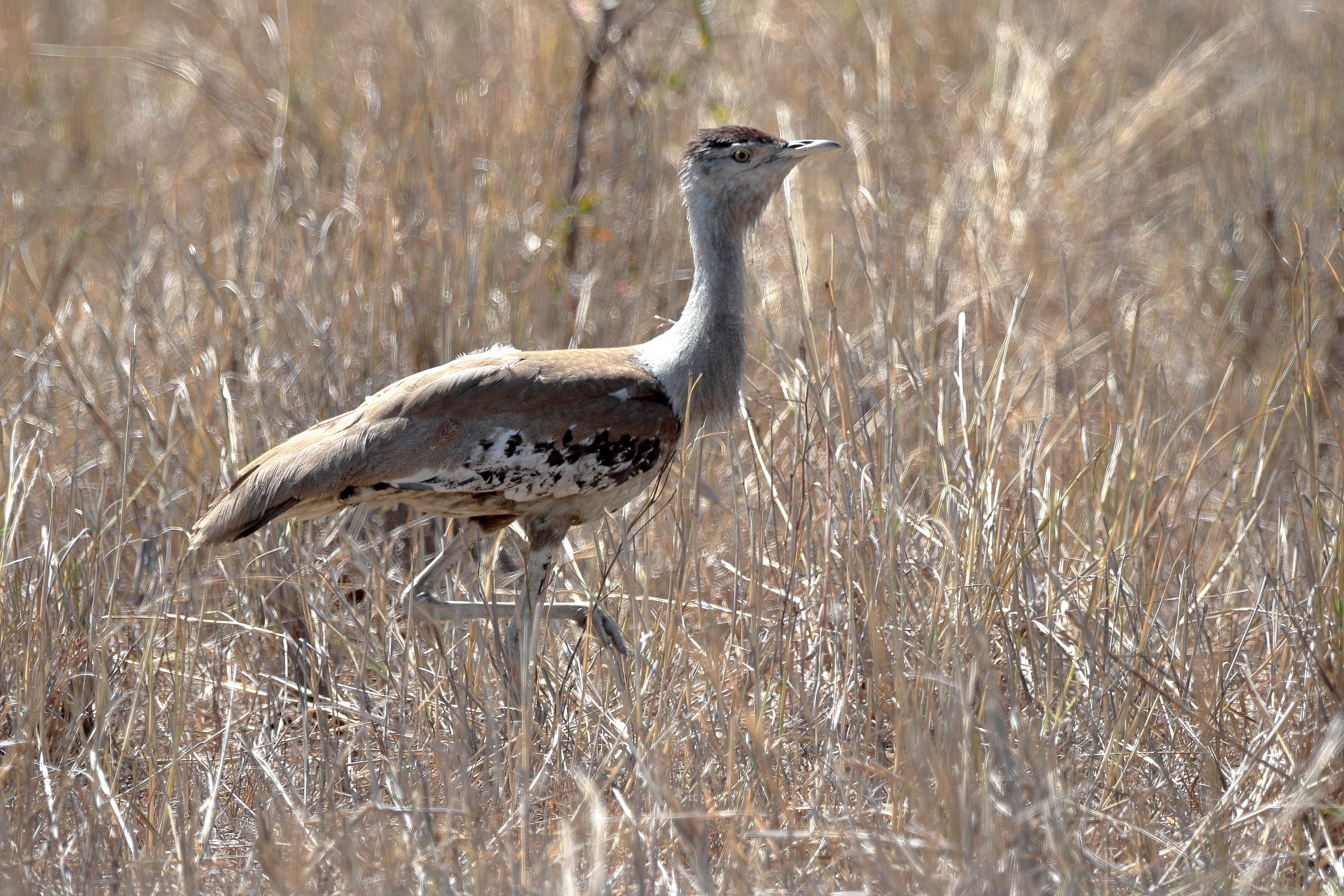
Australian bustard photographed in Queensland, Australia

One of Serendip Sanctuary's initial breeding programs included the reintroduction of the Australian bustard (Ardeotis australis). The program launched in the 1960s to study, breed and reintroduce the fallen Australian bustard populations. Serendip Sanctuary was used to recreate the bustard's natural lek mating system in captivity. In lek mating systems, male bustards defend small clustered areas that female bustards visit for the purpose of mating. In such systems, males are confined together at specific sites for display, where females visit to select their mating partner. Researchers at Serendip Sanctuary recreated the lek mating system in captivity by constructing an enclosure that allowed female bustards to enter and select a male mating partner, but separated the males from direct contact.

=== Brolga breeding program ===
Serendip Sanctuary has a breeding program for the native brolga (Antigone rubicunda). In recent decades, there has been a consistent decline in brolga populations within south-eastern Australia mainly due to habitat loss and destruction, collision with utility lines, subdivision of habitats and predation of feral animals including foxes. Serendip Sanctuary's rehabilitation and captive breeding procedures follow a three-step process from birth, characterised by age. After 24 hours in the brooder post birth, brolgas are placed in an enclosed room with a heater in close range. From 2 days old, brolgas are placed in larger areas as growth progresses, with a heater being raised higher in height. Finally, from 4–5 months old, brolgas are left permanently outside in a fully open enclosure, still with access to a heater before being completely released into the wild. Intense monitoring from birth till 4–5 months old is paramount due to their high fragility during this time, therefore monitoring increases the successful repopulation.

== Flora and fauna ==
Serendip is positioned within the grassy woodlands and wetlands in the Volcanic Western Plains of Victoria. The biodiversity among these environments allows many native florae to thrive. Plant species that exist within Serendip include a variety of trees, shrubs, graminoids, and ferns. Some of these include austral bracken, wattle, narrow-leaved peppermint, yellow box and red river gum trees, tussock grass and water ribbon arrow grass.

There is a diverse range of fauna within Serendip due to the various ecological habitats including the wetlands and grassy woodlands. Animal species range from birds, mammals, amphibians and reptiles. The most prevalent animals include the Australian bustard, brolga, eastern grey kangaroo, swamp wallaby, herons, ducks and magpie geese.

== Ecosystems ==
Serendip is composed of wetland and grassy woodland ecosystems allowing for different flora and fauna species to thrive in diverse habitats. The park exhibits the open wetlands of the Volcanic Western Plain through its three main wetland types; open wetland, shallow freshwater wetland and marshland. The permanent open wetland located on the North Arm supports fish populations providing food for different breeds of fishing birds within Serendip. The shallow freshwater wetland is ephemeral to Serendip, with a pattern of desiccation every 2–3 years. This specific wetland is dependent on water flow from the You Yangs water catchment. Serendip has marshland (or marsh wetlands), forming transitions between aquatic and terrestrial ecosystems. The marshlands consist of varying depth, dominated by copious grasses, ruses and reeds.

Grassy woodlands are another prime ecosystem within Serendip. These areas are limited within the Victorian Volcanic Plain due to farming practises, burning regimes and weed invasion, making Serendip's grassy woodlands of high conservation value. Serendip's grassy woodlands are primarily made up of eucalypts creating an open tree canopy with a native understorey.
