= Adrienne Ruth Hardham =

Australian botanist and phytopathologist

Adrienne Ruth Hardham FAA
- Awards: Gottschalk Medal; Peter Goldacre Award

Academic background
- Education: Monash University; Australian National University
- Thesis: Microtubules and morphogenesis in Azolla pinnata roots

Academic work
- Discipline: botany
- Institutions: Australian National University
- Main interests: plant pathogens

Adrienne Hardham FAA is a professor within the division of Plant Sciences of the Research School of Biology at the Australian National University.

== Education ==
Adrienne Hardham completed a Bachelor of Science at Monash in 1973 and completed her Honours year at the Australian National University (ANU) in 1974. She completed her PhD thesis entitled "Microtubules and morphogenesis in Azolla pinnata roots" in 1978 at the ANU, for which she received the Crawford Medal.

== Career ==
After completing her PhD, Adrienne carried out postdoctoral research at the Research School of Biological Sciences at ANU and Carleton University in Ottawa, Canada. In 1980, Adrienne was awarded a prestigious Australian Research Council Queen Elizabeth II fellowship in the School of Botany at the University of Melbourne. Adrienne returned to the Research School of Biological Sciences at ANU in 1982 as a Research Fellow and progressed to group leader of the Plant Cell Biology group. Upon the establishment of the Research School of Biology at ANU, Adrienne became lab leader of the Plant Pathogens Interactions lab, which uses a range of molecular and microscopy techniques to investigate the infection of plants by Phytophthora and fungal pathogens. Adrienne serves on the editorial boards of Protoplasma and Peer J.

== Honours ==
Adrienne received the Peter Goldacre Award from the Australian Society of Plant Scientists in 1988 and the Gottschalk Medal from the Australian Academy of Science in 1989 for work in biology or medicine by a person under 37. Adrienne was elected as a fellow of the Australian Academy of Science in 1997. In 2002, Adrienne was awarded a Centenary Medal for service to Australian society and science in plant cell biology.
