= Alfred Gottschalk (biochemist) =

German biochemist

- Born: 22nd of April 1894; Aachen, German Empire
- Died: 4th of October 1973; Tübingen, West Germany
- Citizenship: German, British (naturalised)
- Education: University of Bonn, Ludwig-Maximilians-Universität München, University of Melbourne
- Known for: Glycoprotein research, discovery of neuraminidase
- Scientific career
- Fields: Biochemistry
- Institutions: Kaiser Wilhelm Institute for Experimental Therapy and Biochemistry, Melbourne Technical College, University of Melbourne, Walter and Eliza Hall Institute, Australian National University, Max Planck Institute for Virus Research
- Patrons: Charles Kellaway
- Thesis: Collected papers (1949)

Alfred Gottschalk (22 April 1894 – 4 October 1973) was a German biochemist who was a leading authority in glycoprotein research. During his career he wrote 216 research papers and reviews, and four

books.

Gottschalk was born in Aachen, the third of four children to Benjamin and Rosa Gottschalk, who had Jewish heritage. He was raised Catholic. He chose to study medicine, from 1912 he attended the Ludwig-Maximilians-Universität München, the University of Freiburg and the University of Bonn. During the war he served in the medical corps of the German Army. He completed his medical degree in 1920, graduating MD from the University of Bonn. He completed clinical work experience at the medical schools of Frankfurt am Main and Würzburg and physiology-biochemistry studies at Bonn, that led to his first publications, an award from the University of Madrid and an invitation to work at the Kaiser Wilhelm Institute for Experimental Therapy and Biochemistry with Carl Neuberg.

In 1923, he married Lisbeth Berta Orgler; together they had one son. They separated in 1950. Gottschalk left the Kaiser Wilhelm Institute for Biochemistry in 1926 to become Director of the Biochemical Department at the General Hospital in Stettin. He left the hospital in 1934 following upheaval in Nazi Germany and entered private practice, left for England in the spring of 1939, and on to Melbourne in July. He was offered a position as a biochemist by Charles Kellaway, director of the Walter and Eliza Hall Institute (WEHI). He initially worked with yeast enzymes and fermentation, but in 1947 he joined the virus department, where he worked with Frank Macfarlane Burnet. He also taught biochemistry and organic chemistry at the Melbourne Technical College and later at the University of Melbourne. In 1945, he became a naturalized British citizen. In 1949, he received a DSc from the University of Melbourne.

He was elected a Fellow of the Australian Academy of Science in 1954. He discovered viral neuraminidase there in 1957. As Burnet stated: “In the world of biochemistry the most important contribution of the Walter and Eliza Hall Institute is regarded as Gottschalk’s discovery of the structure of the sialic acids and his recognition that an enzyme which I had characterised biologically was chemically a neuraminidase. Gottschalk’s work was masterly, and it was definitive.”

On his retirement in 1959, he was invited by his friend and former WEHI colleague Frank Fenner to research at the John Curtin School of Medical Research at the Australian National University. He returned to West Germany in 1963, where he was appointed Guest-Professor at the Max Planck Institute for Virus Research in Tübingen. He continued active research and for his contributions to science was elected to the Fellowship of the American Association for the Advancement of Science in 1967 and received an honorary doctorate from the University of Münster (MD) in 1969.

He died in Tübingen on 4 October 1973. The Gottschalk Medal for medical research awarded by the Australian Academy of Science is named in his honour.
