= Dz13 =

Dz13 is an experimental treatment developed by scientists at the University of New South Wales. The drug aims to combat a range of illnesses, including skin cancer, restenosis, arthritis and macular degeneration. Trials of Dz13 were suspended in 2013.

== Mechanism of action ==
Dz13 is a 10-23 DNAzyme that targets c-Jun, a transcription factor found in diseased blood vessels, eyes, lungs and joints. The treatment works by the DNA-based enzyme binding to and catalytically destroying its target messenger RNA, thereby inhibiting c-Jun expression in cells. Dz13 has underpinned the development of a library of programmable DNAzymes operable in a cellular environment.

The potential of Dz13 as a therapeutic agent derives from the fact that inactivation of c-Jun can have an effect on downstream genes such as MMP-2, MMP-9, VEGF and FGF-2. Dz13 also inhibits the expression of pro-inflammatory cytokines such as TNF-alpha, interferon gamma and IL-6.

Dz13 has been used with carriers such as cationic polymers for improved cellular delivery and efficacy. Dz13 in such polymers inhibits tumor cell proliferation and migration by suppressing levels of c-Jun and MMPs, reduces H1N1 and H7N2 viral replication and increases survival of mice infected with influenza A and suppresses c-Jun and solid tumor growth in biomimetic nanoballs. Dz13 has also been used in dermal drug delivery systems for enhanced skin penetration of DNAzyme.

It has been reported off-target effects of Dz13, not related to the inactivation of c-Jun

== Effects ==
Dz13 has been shown to inhibit skin cancer growth, angiogenesis and tumor angiogenesis and improve survival in mice infected with H5N1.

Anti-cancer effects have been also demonstrated in models of prostate cancer, breast cancer and osteosarcoma.

Clinical trials of Dz13 in patients with basal cell carcinoma commenced in Australia in 2010. In 2013 it was reported that Dz13 was safe and well tolerated after single intratumoral injection at all doses. c-Jun expression was reduced in the excised tumors of all patients injected and tumor depth decreased in the majority. This was the first report of the clinical use of a DNAzyme.

The outcome of two other clinical trials evaluating DNAzymes performed in Asia and Europe were reported in 2014 and 2015, the former assessing an Epstein–Barr virus latent membrane protein 1 targeting DNAzyme and the latter a DNAzyme targeting the transcription factor GATA3 which involved 7 trial sites. In both trials, there were no adverse events due to DNAzyme. There was demonstrable efficacy noted in nasopharyngeal cancer patients injected with LMP1 DNAzyme and allergic asthma patients following GATA3 DNAzyme inhalation.

== Investigations ==
In 2013, trials of Dz13 were suspended after concerns were raised about alleged duplicated images in a 2010 paper. A series of investigations conducted by independent expert panels of inquiry under the Australian Code for the Responsible Conduct of Research found genuine error and made no finding of misconduct. This decision was discussed in a news article by the Australian Broadcasting Corporation in October 2019.
