= David Syme Research Prize =

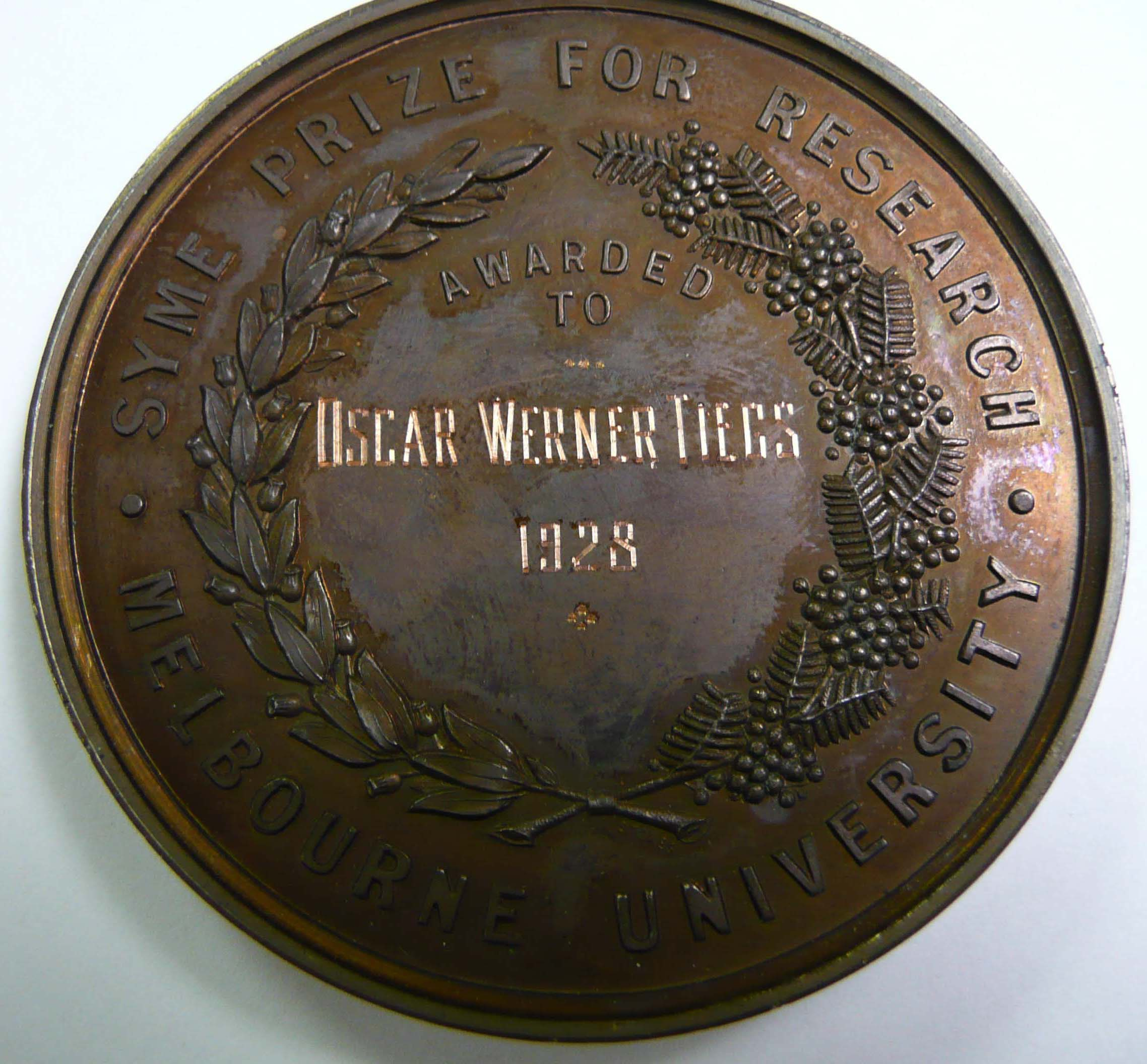
The medal awarded to Oscar Werner Tiegs

The David Syme Research Prize is an annual award administered by the University of Melbourne for the best original research work in biology, physics, chemistry or geology, produced in Australia during the preceding two years. Particular preference is given to original research to enhance industrial and/or commercial development.

The Prize was created at the university in 1904 when Melbourne newspaper publisher and owner of The Age David Syme made a £3,000 bequest for the foundation of the prize. The first prize was awarded in 1906. The publishers of The Age have continued to fund the award. The prize consists of a medal as well as the interest from the original bequest (since 2020 an amount of the order of A$10,000), which may be topped-up further by the publishers. The recipient(s) of the award is chosen by a council selected from the university's Faculty of Science.

== Recipients ==
Source: University of Melbourne

- 1906 – Edward Henry Embley
- 1907 – Harold Launcelot Wilkinson
- 1908 – Basil Kilvington
- 1909 – Harald Ingemann Jensen
- 1910 – Henry George Chapman
- 1911 – Georgina Sweet
- 1912 – Charles Oswald; George Larcombe
- 1913 – Thomas Harvey Johnston
- 1914 – Joseph Mason Baldwin
- 1915 – Ernest Clayton Andrews, for his works on 'The Cobar Copper and Gold Field' and subsequent surveys
- 1916 – Charles Hedley
- 1917 – Henry Joseph Grayson
- 1918 – Thomas Griffith Taylor
- 1919 – Frank Leslie Stillwell
- 1920 – Frederick Chapman
- 1921 – Neil Hamilton Fairley
- 1922 – Henry George Smith
- 1923 – Frank Longstaff Apperley
- 1924 – Loftus Hills
- 1925 – James Stanley Rogers
- 1926 – Ernst Johannes Hartung
- 1927 – Harold Robert Dew; Ethel Irene McLennan
- 1928 – Oscar Werner Tiegs
- 1929 – Charles Albert Edward Fenner for his thesis, Adelaide, South Australia A Study in Human Geography
- 1930 – Reuben Thomas Patton
- 1931 – Cecil Ernest Eddy; Samuel John King
- 1932 – Arthur William Turner
- 1933 – Ian William Wark
- 1934 – Walter George Kannaluik; Leslie Harold Martin
- 1935 – Rupert Allan Willis
- 1936 – Donald Finlay Fergusson Thomson
- 1937 – Austin Burton Evans; Roy Douglas Wright
- 1938 – No award
- 1939 – William Davies
- 1940 – Edwin Sherbon Hills; Howard Knox Worner
- 1941 – Frederick Alexander Singleton
- 1942 – Everton Rowe Trethewie
- 1943 – Brian John Grieve; Victor David Hopper
- 1944 – George Baker; Francis Norman Lahey
- 1945 – John Stewart Anderson; Frank Herbert Shaw
- 1946 – H. Leighton Kesteven; Fletcher Donaldson Cruikshank
- 1947 – Avon Maxwell Clark
- 1948 – Keith Leonard Sutherland
- 1949 – Frank John Fenner
- 1950 – Curt Teichert
- 1951 – Alfred Gottschalk; Hill Wesley Worner
- 1952 – Henri Daniel Rathgeber; G. Reid
- 1953 – Douglas Frew Waterhouse; Francis Patrick Dwyer
- 1954 – Alexander McLeod Mathieson; Alexander Thomas Dick
- 1955 – Herbert George Andrewartha; L. C. Birch
- 1956 – Charles H.B. Priestley
- 1957 – Leonard Ernest Samuels
- 1958 – Jack Hobart Piddington
- 1959 – Ronald Drayton Brown; Wilbur Norman Christiansen
- 1960 – W.D. Jackson; Brian Milton Spicer
- 1961 – Leo Michael Clarebrough; Michael H. Loretto
- 1963 – Frank William Ernest Gibson
- 1964 – Donald Metcalf; Arthur William Pryor; T. Sabine; D. Walker; B. Hickman
- 1965 – L.R. Clark; John Melvyn Swan
- 1966 – L. Nichol; Guy Kendall White
- 1967 – Norman Keith Boardman; L.F. Henderson
- 1968 – R.M. May; T.A. O'Donnell; J.V. Sullivan
- 1969 – R. Colton; Alfred James "Jim" Pittard; Alan Kenneth Head
- 1970 – James Howard Bradbury; J.R. Egerton; M.E. Hargreaves; Winfred Nayler
- 1971 – Arthur James Dyer; Bruce B. Hicks
- 1972 – Richard Limon Stanton
- 1973 – Malcolm A. S. Moore for his research work in the study of myeloid leukaemia
- 1974 – David Leslie Kepert
- 1975 – Garth William Paltridge
- 1976 – David H. Solomon
- 1977 – Ian Hamilton Holmes
- 1978 – Alan M. Bond
- 1979 – John Warwick Anderson
- 1980 – Le Roy Freame Henderson; William Hugh Sawyer
- 1981 – Frank Andrew Smith; N.A. Walker
- 1982 – Suzanne Cory; Jerry Mckee Adams
- 1983 – Jacob Nissim Israelachvili; L.A. Bursill
- 1984 – Ronald Cooper
- 1985 – Greg Dusting
- 1986 – Roger J. Summers
- 1987 – Anthony James Underwood; H.M. Geysen
- 1988 – Ronald Holden Vernon
- 1989 – James B. Reid
- 1993 – Philip Beart
- 1994 – Stephen Hyde; Steven Prawer
- 1995 – Igor Bray
- 1997 – Ralph MacNally
- 1998 – Paul Mulvaney
- 1999 – Anthony Weiss
- 2000 – Geoff McFadden – Plasmodium research; Mark Humphrey
- 2001 – Richard O'Hair; Mark Graeme Humphrey
- 2002 – Calum Drummond
- 2003 – Graham Baldwin; Bernard Luke Flynn
- 2004 – David Jackson for commercialisation of synthetic peptide technology; Trevor Lithgow for discovery of the protein Omp85.
- 2005 – Brendan Crabb – malaria research at the Walter and Eliza Hall Institute
- 2006 – Christopher Chantler; Mark Rizzacasa
- 2007 – Stuart Wyithe
- 2008 – David C.S. Huang
- 2009 – Michael R Kearney
- 2010 – Harry Quiney
- 2011 – Robert Scholten
- 2012 – Lars Kjer-Nielsen
- 2013 – Andrea Morello
- 2014 – Spencer Williams
- 2015 – Paul Donnelly; Dr Peter Macreadie
- 2016 – Igor Aharonovich; Cynthia Whitchurch
- 2017 – Wai-Hong Tham
- 2018 – Luhua Li
- 2019 – Luke Connal
- 2020 – Fan Wang; Marco Herold
- 2021 – Nicolas Flament
- 2022 – Jiajia Zhou
- 2023 – Amy Cain
- 2024 – Natasha Hurley-Walker

== See also ==
- List of general science and technology awards
