= List of acts of the Parliament of Victoria from 1916 =

This is a list of acts of the Parliament of Victoria, Australia for the year 1916.

== 1916 ==
Short title, or popular name	Citation	Royal assent
Long title
	7 Geo. V. No. 2820	13 July 1916
An Act to apply out of the Consolidated Revenue the sum of Two millions five hundred and eight thousand three hundred and seventy-three pounds to the service of the year One thousand nine hundred and sixteen and One thousand nine hundred and seventeen.
	7 Geo. V. No. 2821	21 August 1916
An Act to apply out of the Consolidated Revenue the sum of Two hundred and forty-eight thousand seven hundred and fifty- seven pounds to the service of the year One thousand nine hundred and fifteen and One thousand nine hundred and sixteen.
Education Act 1916	7 Geo. V. No. 2822	4 September 1916
An Act to further amend the Education Act 1915. (Note: Education Act 1915 (6 Geo. V. No. 2644))
State Savings Bank Act 1916	7 Geo. V. No. 2823	25 September 1916
An Act to authorize the Commissioners of the State Savings Bank of Victoria to invest in Stock and other Securities issued for War Purposes under the authority of any Act of tlie Parliament of the Commonwealth of Australia.
Execution of Trusts Act 1916	7 Geo. V. No. 2824	2 October 1916
An Act to amend and extend the provisions of the Execution of Trusts Act 1915. (Note: Execution of Trusts Act 1915 (6 Geo. V. No. 2595))
Medical Act 1916	7 Geo. V. No. 2825	2 October 1916
An Act relating to Chemists' Apprentices on War Service.
Colac Market Land Act 1916	7 Geo. V. No. 2826	9 October 1916
Aim Act to revoke the Permanent Reservation of the remaining portion of certain Crown Land at Colac permanently reserved from Sale as a Site for a Market.
Intoxicating Liquor (Temporary Restriction) Act 1916	7 Geo. V. No. 2827	9 October 1916
An Act to amend and continue the Intoxicating Liquor (Temporary Restriction) Act 1915 (Note: Intoxicating Liquor (Temporary Restriction) Act 1915 (6 Geo. V. No. 2584)) and for other purposes.
Evidence Act 1916	7 Geo. V. No. 2828	9 October 1916
An Act to amend the Law of Evidence.
Unauthorized Documents Act 1916	7 Geo. V. No. 2829	9 October 1916
An Act to amend the Unauthorized Documents Act 1915. (Note: Unauthorized Documents Act 1915 (6 Geo. V. No. 2593))
University Act 1916	7 Geo. V. No. 2830	9 October 1916
An Act to provide for the conferring of University Degrees Diplomas Certificates or Licences in the case of Persons who have become qualified to receive the same but have died on War Service.
Poor Prisoners Defence Act 1916	7 Geo. V. No. 2831	12 October 1916
An Act to provide for the Defence of Accused Persons who are without Adequate Means.
Port Melbourne Loan Act 1916	7 Geo. V. No. 2832	12 October 1916
An Act to enable the Council of the Town of Port Melbourne to apply certain Surplus Moneys in hand from the Number 5 Loan so as to increase the Amount proposed to be applied for a certain Permanent Work from the said Loan.
Members' Qualifications (Amendment) Act 1916	7 Geo. V. No. 2833	12 October 1916
An Aet Relating to the Qualification of Members of the Legislative Council and of the Legislative Assembly.
	7 Geo. V. No. 2834	12 October 1916
An Act to apply out of the Consolidated Revenue the sum of One million two hundred and eighty-nine thousand eight hundred and eighty-eight pounds to the service of the year One thousand nine hundred and sixteen and One thousand nine hundred and seventeen.
Betting Tax Act 1916	7 Geo. V. No. 2835	23 October 1916
An Act for imposing certain Stamp Duties on Bookmakers' Licences or Permits and on Betting Tickets and for other purposes.
Melbourne to Burwood Tramways Act 1916	7 Geo. V. No. 2836	6 November 1916
An Act to increase the Borrowing Powers of the Hawthorn Tramways Trust.
Creswick Land Act 1916 (repealed)	7 Geo. V. No. 2837	6 November 1916
An Act to provide for the Closing of Portions of certain Streets in the Municipal District of Creswick and for the Compulsory Resumption on behalf of the King of certain Lands in the said District and for Vesting the said Portions of Streets and the said and other Lands in The Creswick District Hospital for the purposes of a Hospital. (Repealed by Statute Law Revision Act 1984 (No. 10087))
Daylight Saving Act 1916 (repealed)	7 Geo. V. No. 2838	6 November 1916
An Act to promote the Earlier Use of Daylight in certain Months yearly and for other purposes. (Repealed by Statute Law Revision Act 1984 (No. 10087))
Bellarine Land Act 1916	7 Geo. V. No. 2839	6 November 1916
An Act to revoke the Permanent Reservation of certain Land in the Parish of Bellarine as a Site for a Race-course and other purposes of Public Recreation.
South Melbourne and Port Melbourne Land Act 1916	7 Geo. V. No. 2840	6 November 1916
An Act to revoke the Permanent Reservation of certain Crown Land in the City of South Melbourne and the Town of Port Melbourne.
Geelong Waterworks and Sewerage Act 1916	7 Geo. V. No. 2841	6 November 1916
An Act to amend the Geelong Waterworks and Sewerage Acts.
Mildura College Lands Act 1916	7 Geo. V. No. 2842	6 November 1916
An Act relating to certain Agricultural School or College Lands situate at Mildura and for other purposes.
Registration of Births Deaths and Marriages Act 1916	7 Geo. V. No. 2843	6 November 1916
An Act to amend the Law relating to the Legitimation of Children by Registration under the Registration of Births Deaths and Marriages Acts.
Railway Lands Acquisition Act 1916	7 Geo. V. No. 2844	6 November 1916
An Act to amend the Railway Lands Acquisition Act 1915. (Note: Railway Lands Acquisition Act 1915 (6 Geo. V. No. 2715))
White Phosphorus Matches Prohibition Act 1916	7 Geo. V. No. 2845	6 November 1916
An Act to prohibit the Manufacture and Sale of Matches made with White Phosphorus and for other purposes in connexion therewith.
Wheat Marketing Act 1916	7 Geo. V. No. 2846	27 November 1916
An Act to extend the Operation of and to amend the Wheat Marketing Act 1915. (Note: Wheat Marketing Act 1915 (6 Geo. V. No. 2812))
Melbourne Building By-laws Act 1916	7 Geo. V. No. 2847	27 November 1916
An Act relating to Building By-laws of the City of Melbourne.
Heatherton Sanatorium Act 1916	7 Geo. V. No. 2848	27 November 1916
An Act relating to the Heatherton Sanatorium.
Transfer of Land Act 1916	7 Geo. V. No. 2849	27 November 1916
An Act to amend the Transfer of Land Act 1915. (Note: Transfer of Land Act 1915 (6 Geo. V. No. 2740))
Fungicides Act 1916	7 Geo. V. No. 2850	27 November 1916
An Act to regulate the Sale of Fungicides, Insecticides, Vermin Destroyers, and Weed Destroyers, and for other purposes.
Gaols Act 1916	7 Geo. V. No. 2851	4 December 1916
An Act to amend the Gaols Act 1915. (Note: Gaols Act 1915 (6 Geo. V. No. 2659))
Water Act 1916	7 Geo. V. No. 2852	4 December 1916
An Act to amend the Water Act 1915. (Note: Water Act 1915 (6 Geo. V. No. 2747))
	7 Geo. V. No. 2853	11 December 1916
An Act to apply out of the Consolidated Revenue the sum of Six hundred and seventy-two thousand and sixty-one pounds to the service of the year One thousand nine hundred and sixteen and One thousand nine hundred and seventeen.
Friendly Societies Act 1916	7 Geo. V. No. 2854	11 December 1916
An Act to amend the Friendly Societies Acts.
Licensing Act 1916	7 Geo. V. No. 2855	18 December 1916
An Act to amend the Licensing Acts.
Presentments Act 1916	7 Geo. V. No. 2856	21 December 1916
An Act to amend the Law relating to Presentments in Criminal Cases, and matters preliminary, incidental, or similar thereto.
Instruments Act 1916	7 Geo. V. No. 2857	28 December 1916
An Act to amend Part VI. of the Instruments Act 1915. (Note: Instruments Act 1915 (6 Geo. V. No. 2672))
Venereal Diseases Act 1916	7 Geo. V. No. 2858	28 December 1916
An Act relating to Venereal Diseases and to amend Part V. of the Police Offences Act 1915. (Note: Police Offences Act 1915 (6 Geo. V. No. 2708))
Melbourne and Geelong Improvements Act 1916	7 Geo. V. No. 2859	28 December 1916
An Act to empower the City of Melbourne and the City of Geelong to reclaim and improve insanitary low-lying or overcrowded areas.
Infectious Diseases Hospital Act 1916	7 Geo. V. No. 2860	28 December 1916
An Act to amend the Infectious Diseases Hospital Act 1914. (Note: Infectious Diseases Hospital Act 1914 (4 Geo. V. No. 2493))
Municipal Rates Recovery Act 1916	7 Geo. V. No. 2861	28 December 1916
An Act to make further provision for the Recovery by Municipalities of Rates and other Moneys.
Country Roads Act 1916	7 Geo. V. No. 2862	28 December 1916
An Act to amend the Country Roads Act 1915. (Note: Country Roads Act 1915 (6 Geo. V. No. 2635))
Intestate Estates Distribution Act 1916	7 Geo. V. No. 2863	28 December 1916
An Act to amend the Law relating to the Distribution of the Estates of Persons dying Intestate.
Administration and Probate Act 1916 (repealed)	7 Geo. V. No. 2864	28 December 1916
An Act to amend the Administration and Probate Act 1915. (Note: Administration and Probate Act 1915 (6 Geo. V. No. 2611)) (Repealed by Administration and Probate Act 1928 (19 Geo. V. No. 3632))
Land Tax Act 1916	7 Geo. V. No. 2865	28 December 1916
An Act to declare the Rate of Land Tax for the Year ending the thirty-first day of December One thousand nine hundred and seventeen and to amend the Land Tax Acts.
Constitution Act Amendment Act 1916	7 Geo. V. No. 2866	28 December 1916
An Act to amend Part IX. of The Constitution Act Amendment Act 1915. (Note: Constitution Act Amendment Act 1915 (6 Geo. V. No. 2632))
War Contributions Act 1916 (repealed)	7 Geo. V. No. 2867	28 December 1916
An Act to amend the War Expenditure and Overdrafts Act 1914 (Note: War Expenditure and Overdrafts Act 1914 (5 Geo. V. No. 2548)) and to validate certain Investments by Municipalities in Commonwealth War Loans. (Repealed by Statute Law Revision Act 1995 (No. 11 of 1995))
Supreme Court Act 1916	7 Geo. V. No. 2868	28 December 1916
An Act to amend the Supreme Court Act 1915 (Note: Supreme Court Act 1915 (6 Geo. V. No. 2733)) with respect to the Qualifications of the Master-in-Equity.
Footwear Regulation Act 1916	7 Geo. V. No. 2869	28 December 1916
An Act to regulate the Manufacture and Sale of Footwear and for other purposes.
Medical (Prescriptions) Act 1916	7 Geo. V. No. 2870	28 December 1916
An Act to amend the Law relating to Medical Practitioners.
Victorian Loan Act 1916	7 Geo. V. No. 2871	28 December 1918
An Act to authorize the raising of Money for Irrigation Works and Water Supply Works and for Drainage and Flood Protection Works in Country Districts.
Municipal Endowment Act 1916	7 Geo. V. No. 2872	28 December 1916
An Act relating to Municipal Endowment.
Water Supply Loans Act 1916	7 Geo. V. No. 2873	28 December 1916
An Act to authorize the raising of Money for Water Supply Purposes and to sanction the Issue and Application of such Money for the said Purposes.
Water Supply Loans Application Act 1916	7 Geo. V. No. 2874	28 December 1916
An Act to sanction the issue and application of certain Sums of Money available under Loan Acts for Irrigation Works Water Supply Works Drainage and Flood Protection Works in Country Districts and for other purposes.
Statute Law Revision Act 1916	7 Geo. V. No. 2875	28 December 1916
An Act for removing Anomalies and correcting Errors in the Statute Law and for other purposes.
Statute Law Revision Committee Act 1916	7 Geo. V. No. 2876	28 December 1916
An Act relating to the Parliamentary Joint Statute Law Revision Committee.
Railway Loan Application Act 1916	7 Geo. V. No. 2877	28 December 1916
An Act to sanction the issue and application of certain Sums of Money available under Loan Acts for Railways and for other purposes.
Developmental Railways Account Transfer Act 1916	7 Geo. V. No. 2878	28 December 1916
An Act to provide for the Transfer of a sum of not more than Forty-five thousand pounds from "The Developmental Railways Account" to the Consolidated Revenue.
North Geelong to Fyansford Railway Construction Act 1916 (repealed)	7 Geo. V. No. 2879	28 December 1916
An Act to authorize the Construction by the State of a Line of Railway from North Geelong to Fyansford. (Repealed by Transport Act 1983 (No. 9921))
Rosstown Junction Railway Abandonment Act 1916	7 Geo. V. No. 2880	28 December 1916
An Act to repeal The Rosstown Junction Railway Act (Note: Rosstown Junction Railway Act 1878 (42 Vict. No. 614)) and The Rosstown Junction Railway Amendment Act (Note: Rosstown Junction Railway Amendment Act 1884 (48 Vict. No. 818)) and for other purposes.
Lancefield and Kilmore Railway Act 1916	7 Geo. V. No. 2881	28 December 1916
An Act to empower the Victorian Railways Commissioners to dismantle the Lancefield and Kilmore Railway and to sell or otherwise dispose of the said Railway or Property and to demise any Land vested in them for the purposes thereof.
Thronbury Land Act 1916	7 Geo. V. No. 2882	28 December 1916
An Act to provide for the Modification of a certain Lease granted in pursuance of the Thornbury Land Act 1912. (Note: Thornbury Land Act 1912 (3 Geo. V. No. 2397))
Friendly Societies Act 1916 (No. 2)	7 Geo. V. No. 2883	28 December 1916
An Act to make provision with respect to Contributions under the Friendly Societies Acts by Persons on War Service and for other purposes.
State War Council Act 1916	7 Geo. V. No. 2884	28 December 1916
An Act to make provision for a State War Council and for other purposes.
Railways Act 1916	7 Geo. V. No. 2885	28 December 1916
An Act to make provision in regard to certain Expenditures in connexion with State Railways.
Lunacy Act 1916	7 Geo. V. No. 2886	28 December 1916
An Act to amend the Lunacy Act 1915 (Note: Lunacy Act 1915 (6 Geo. V. No. 2687)) and for other purposes.
Midwives Act 1916	7 Geo. V. No. 2887	28 December 1916
An Act to amend the Midwives Act 1915. (Note: Midwives Act 1915 (6 Geo. V. No. 2773))
	7 Geo. V. No. 2888	28 December 1916
An Act to apply a sum out of the Consolidated Revenue to the service of the year ending on the thirtieth day of June One thousand nine hundred and seventeen and to appropriate the Supplies granted in this Session of Parliament.

== Sources ==
- "1916 Victorian Historical Acts". AustLII.
