= Brendan Crabb =

Australian scientist (born 1966)

Professor Brendan Crabb AC FAA FAHMS
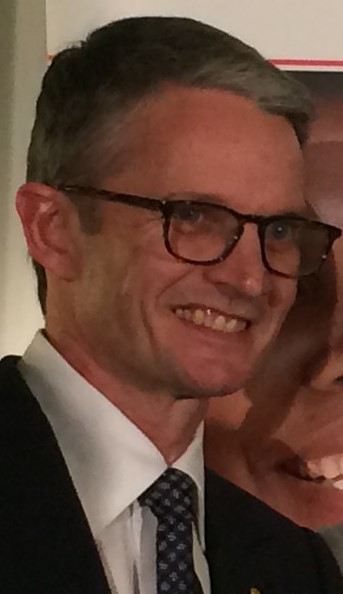
- Crabb in 2015
- Born: Brendan Scott Crabb; 13 September 1966 (age 59); Australia
- Education: University of Melbourne
- Scientific career
- Fields: Immunology
- Workplaces: Burnet Institute

Brendan Scott Crabb (born 13 September 1966) is an Australian microbiologist, research scientist and director and chief executive officer of the Burnet Institute, based in Melbourne, Victoria, Australia.

== Background and early career ==
Educated in Papua New Guinea and Australia, Crabb received a Bachelor of Science (Honours) from the University of Melbourne in the Department of Microbiology. In 1992, he completed his PhD in virology with Michael J. Studdert at the School of Veterinary Science also at the University of Melbourne. His PhD project, which explored proteins of equine herpes, led to a diagnostic test which could distinguish horses infected by the lethal equine herpes virus-1 and the less damaging equine herpes virus-4. He then completed a postdoctoral fellowship in the laboratory of Alan Cowman before starting his independent laboratory at the University of Melbourne.

== Scientific career ==
=== Research focus ===
Crabb's main research focus is on the identification of new targets for therapeutic intervention in malaria and the development of a malaria vaccine. More broadly, his interests mirror the mission of the Burnet Institute - to improve the health of poor and vulnerable communities through research, education and public health.

In 2009, Crabb and his research team identified the export protein translocon in malaria. This discovery was published in Nature and solved the mystery of how proteins with an export motif are trafficked out of the infected parasite and into the cytosol of the red blood cell host. This finding has broad impact in biology and also has considerable importance as a major new drug target in malaria.

Together with his principal collaborator Alan Cowman, Crabb is also well known for his development of molecular genetic systems in human malaria, having described the first gene knockout in the causative agent Plasmodium falciparum in a paper published in the journal Cell.

Professor Crabb is a prominent public communicator on COVID-19. He has led research strategies to support responses in Melbourne and internationally; especially in the areas of diagnostic test and vaccine development, epidemiology and modelling, and through community-based approaches to improve uptake of interventions.

=== Burnet Institute ===
Crabb was appointed director and CEO of Burnet Institute in 2008, a position previously held by Ian Gust AO, John Mills AO, Steve Wesselingh, now executive director of the South Australian Health and Medical Research Institute, Ian McKenzie AM, and Mark Hogarth.

Although a molecular scientist by training, Crabb's interests include addressing technical and non-technical barriers to maternal, newborn and child health in the developing world. In recent years, under the banner of Healthy Mothers, Healthy Babies, he has established a major research field site in East New Britain in Papua New Guinea, principally to identify the underlying drivers (including malaria) of low birth weight and stunted growth in relatively calorie-rich, yet resource-poor settings.

Under Crabb's leadership, Burnet Institute has continued to focus on improving the health of vulnerable populations through strategic, infrastructure and policy initiatives, especially embedding research as a key pillar of the institute's international development activities. In addition, during Crabb's tenure as director and CEO Burnet has:

- expanded its infrastructure with the completion of the Alfred Centre Stage 2 doubling the capacity of Burnet's laboratory facilities and floor space
- refocused its international development and research programs across the Asia Pacific with a priority on addressing the health issues of Papua New Guinea and Myanmar
- restructured with a programmatic focus on issues of maternal, child and adolescent health, disease elimination, health security, and behaviours and health risks
- focused attention on addressing issues of gender equity, and embracing and encouraging diversity within the workplace
- developed commercial activities in Australia and in China (360Biolabs and Nanjing BioPoint Diagnostic Technologies) supporting the institute's long-term sustainability

== Special appointments ==
As President of the Association of Australian Medical Research Institutes (AAMRI) from 2012 to October 2014, Crabb was a leading advocate for high level policy reform and played critical roles in transformative government policy and funding initiatives, including the generation of the $20b Medical Research Future Fund.

He is a Member of the PATH/Malaria Vaccine Initiative and Vaccine Science Portfolio Advisory Council (VSPAC), USA, and was Co-Founder and Co-Chair of the Inaugural Malaria World Congress in Melbourne, Australia, in 2018. He holds honorary professorial appointments at Monash University and Melbourne University in Australia. Other special appointments include:

- Member, National Health and Medical Research Council (NHMRC)
- Chair, Molecular and cell biology, and human genetics sectional committee, Australian Academy of Science
- Member, Telethon Kids Institute Board
- Member, Brain Cancer Centre Research Advisory Committee
- Chair, Australian Global Health Alliance
- Chair, Pacific Friends of Global Health
- Member, mRNA Victoria Scientific Advisory Group
- Member, Victorian Aboriginal Research Accord Reference Group
- Member, World Health Organization Malaria Vaccine Advisory Committee (MALVAC), Geneva
- Member, Board of the Gene Technology Access Centre (GTAC), Victoria
- Member, Victorian Medical Research Strategic Advisory Committee
- Member, Scientific Advisory Board, Centre for Cancer Biology, UniSA and SA Pathology, from 2015
- Chair, Victorian Chapter of the Association of Australian Medical Research Institutes (VicAAMRI), 2014–ongoing
- Chair, Gordon Conference on Malaria, Tuscany, Italy, 2013
- Member, Health Exports Advisory Committee, 2013
- Member, Alfred Medical Research & Education Precinct Council, 2013
- Member, Scientific Advisory Board, Monash Institute of Pharmaceutical Sciences (MIPS), from 2012
- Board Member, AMREP AS Pty Ltd
- Board of Management, Gene Technology Access Centre
- Member, Scientific Advisory Board, Malaria Program, Wellcome Trust, Sanger Institute, UK
- NHMRC Senior Principal Research Fellow, 2007–08
- Editor-in-Chief, International Journal for Parasitology, 2006–09
- NHMRC Principal Research Fellow, 2004–07
- NHMRC Senior Research Fellow, 2003–04
- International Research Scholar, Howard Hughes Medical Institute, USA, 2000–08

== Awards and honours ==
- Fellow of the Australian Academy of Science, 2021
- GSK Award for Research Excellence, 2019
- Australian True Leader in Medical Research, Australian Financial Review, Boss Magazine, 2016
- Companion of the Order of Australia for eminent service to medical science as a prominent researcher of infectious diseases, particularly malaria, and their impact on population health in developing nations, as an advocate, mentor and administrator, and through fostering medical research nationally and internationally, 2015
- Fellow of the Australian Academy of Health and Medical Sciences, 2015
- Bancroft–Mackerras Medal, Australian Society for Parasitology, 2009
- Melbourne Top 100 Most Influential People, The Age Magazine, 2007
- David Syme Research Prize, The University of Melbourne, 2006
- Melbourne Achiever Award, Committee for Melbourne, 2001
- International Scholar Award, Howard Hughes Medical Institute, USA, 2000 & 2005
- Young Tall Poppy Award (Victoria), Australian Institute of Political Science, 1999
