= Wilbur Norman Christiansen =

Australian radio astronomer and electrical engineer

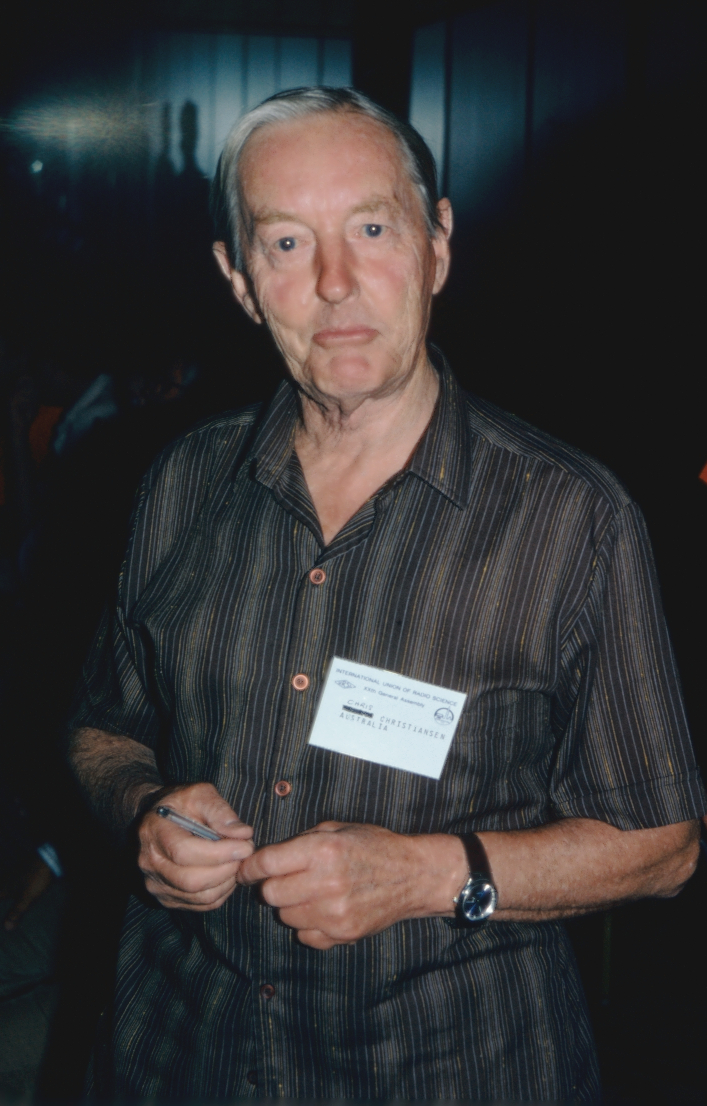
Christiansen in 1981

Wilbur Norman "Chris" Christiansen (9 August 1913 – 26 April 2007) was a pioneer Australian radio astronomer and electrical engineer.

== Family ==
The son of Wilhelm Christiansen (1883-1920), and Ilma Clarice Christiansen (1885-1983), née Jones, Wilbur Norman Christiansen was born in Elsternwick, Victoria on 9 August 1913.

His father was a minister in the Congregational Church, and his mother a music teacher. In his adult life he was always known as "Chris".

He married Elsie Mary Hill, at Chatswood, New South Wales in 1938.

== Education ==
Educated at Caulfield Grammar School from 1921 to 1930, he entered the University of Melbourne in 1931, reading Science, and was associated as a non-resident student with Trinity College, where he won an Exhibition in 1932.

He graduated Bachelor of Science (B.Sc.) (1934), Master of Science (M.Sc.) (1935) — winning the Professor Kernot Research Scholarship in Natural Philosophy. — and Doctor of Science (D.Sc.) (1953) from the University of Melbourne.

Along with Ronald Drayton Brown, he was awarded the Syme Prize Medal for 1959.

== Career ==
Christiansen built the first grating array for scanning the sun at the radio astronomy field station at Potts Hill, New South Wales. A later array at Badgerys Creek, New South Wales, the Chris Cross Telescope, was named after Christiansen. For many years, he was chairman of the electrical engineering department at the University of Sydney.

In 1981 he was made an honorary fellow of the Institution of Engineers Australia.

== Royal Commission on Espionage ==
On 27 January 1955, Christiansen appeared before the Royal Commission on Espionage.

He was extensively questioned in relation to his own political orientation, the influence of certain of his wife's siblings — one of whom had the code name "Tourist" — and, in particular, in relation to the fact that he was not only mentioned in secret Russian Ministry of Internal Affairs (M.V.D.) documents turned over to the Australian authorities by Vladimir Petrov, but also had been of such interest to the Russians that they had given him the unique code name of "Master".

It was determined that there was no grounds for any suspicion of him ever having any connexion with the M.V.D.; and, in the process of his examination, the counsel assisting the Commission, George Pape, produced statements from both Mr. and Mrs. Petrov asserting that Christiansen was not known to them at all.

== Death ==
He died on 26 April 2007 in Dorrigo, New South Wales, near his son Tim and his brother Steven. His wife Elspeth died in 2001 and their son Peter, also a space physicist, died in 1992.

== See also ==
- List of Caulfield Grammar School people
- Google doodle from 2013 https://doodles.google/doodle/wilbur-norman-christiansens-100th-birthday/
