= James Stanley Rogers =

Australian physicist (1893–1977)

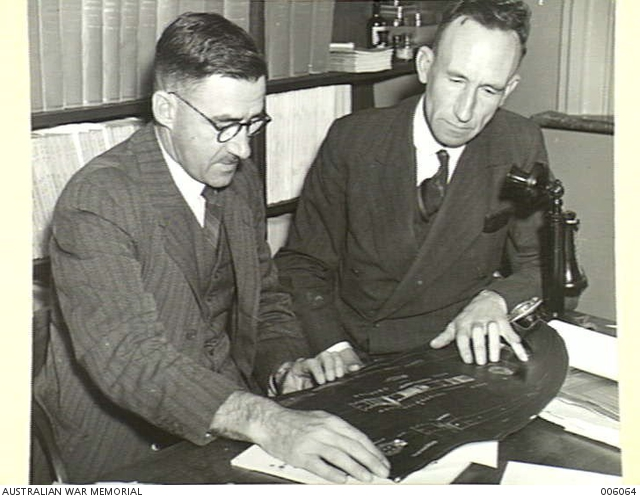
- James Stanley Rogers, MC, Secretary of the Optical Munitions Panel (right) discusses with Associate Professor E. O. Hercus, a problem in optical munitions.
- Born: 18 June 1893; Beaconsfield, Tasmania, Australia
- Died: 23 July 1977 (aged 84); Heidelberg, Victoria, Australia
- Education: University of Melbourne; University of Cambridge
- Relatives: John David Rogers
- Military career
- Branch: First Australian Imperial Force
- Service years: 1915–1919
- Rank: Captain
- Conflicts: First World War; Western Front; Battle of Pozieres; Battle of Messines; Battle of Passchendaele; Hundred Days Offensive
- Awards: Military Cross

James Stanley Rogers, MC (18 June 1893 – 23 July 1977) was an Australian physicist. A graduate of the University of Melbourne, he served in the Australian Army in the First World War and was awarded the Military Cross. During the Second World War, he was secretary and executive-officer of the Optical Munitions Panel, which oversaw the production of precision optical equipment.

== Early life and education ==
James Stanley Rogers (known to his family as Stan) was born in Beaconsfield, Tasmania, on 29 April 1895, the oldest of nine children of James Rogers, a Methodist clergyman, and his wife Agnes née Caldwell. He had an younger brother, John David Rogers, and six younger sisters: Agnes, Jean, Ethel, Amelia (Mill), Lois and Ella. (Another brother died in infancy.) The family moved to Campbells Creek, Victoria, in 1900, and then to Dimboola, Victoria, in 1905.

Rogers attended the Bendigo Continuation School, where he was dux of the school and matriculated in 1910. He entered the University of Melbourne the following year, and studied for his Bachelor of Arts degree while working as a teacher at schools in country Victoria, including Shepparton Agricultural High School. He was a lieutenant in the Senior Cadets.

== Great War ==
Following the outbreak of the Great War, Rogers enlisted in the First Australian Imperial Force (AIF) as a private on 25 June 1915 and joined the 9th Reinforcements of the 6th Battalion. On 23 July he was transferred to the 9th Reinforcement of the 14th Battalion. He embarked on the HMAT Hororata on 27 September 1915 and joined his battalion, which had recently returned from the Gallipoli campaign, at Tel el Kebir in Egypt on 4 March 1916. He was promoted to lance corporal on 18 March and sergeant on 25 March. He was commissioned as a second lieutenant on 25 May. He embarked for France from Alexandria on 1 June and arrived at Marseille seven days later. The 14th battalion took heavy casualties in the Battle of Pozieres, and he was promoted to lieutenant on 25 August 1916.

Rogers was selected for staff duties as a GSO3 with the headquarters of the 4th Division, of which the 14th Battalion was a part. He was promoted to captain on 18 April 1917, replacing an officer who had been killed in action the week before. He attended a brief staff officer course at Clare College, Cambridge, in the UK. The commandant reported that he was "keen and reliable, but without a great deal of experience. More suited to G than Q." He distinguished himself in the Battle of Messines, for which he was awarded the Military Cross. His recommendation read:

Has done very good work especially during operations in June 1917, and during the period when the division occupied the Messines and Wytschaete sectors in July and August 1917. He performed the work of GSO III very effectively."

On 10 January 1918, Rogers was seconded to the British 4th Division as a GSO3. He was subsequently selected for the role of brigade major, the senior staff officer of a brigade. He was acting brigade major of the British 10th Infantry Brigade from 24 to 30 April. On 8 October, he was assigned to the British Army's Tank Corps as a GSO3. On 4 November, he became the brigade major of the British 3rd Tank Brigade.

On 28 February 1919, with the war over, Rogers returned to the 14th Battalion. He was attached to 4th Division headquarters again on 10 March. He embarked for the UK from Le Havre on 4 April, and then embarked for Australia at Plymouth on the SS Miltiades on 19 June. On 5 August, he reached Melbourne, where his AIF appointment was terminated on 5 October 1919.

== Between the wars ==
Rogers returned to teaching and his studies at the University of Melbourne. He completed his Bachelor of Arts and Diploma of Education while teaching at Melbourne High School. Rogers and his brother John paid for their sisters Amelia (Mill) and Ethel to attend the Methodist Ladies' College, Melbourne. Rogers went on to earn a Bachelor of Science degree in 1921. In March of that year, he quit teaching to study for a Master of Science degree in physics under the supervision of Thomas Laby, which he received in 1922. His research examined the structure of the platinum and tungsten, and the scattering and absorption of X-rays. On 12 July 1922, he married Hazel Carr, the daughter of Geelong City Councillor W. L. Carr, at the Presbyterian Church in the Melbourne suburb of Kew. They had two daughters.

In 1922, Rogers was awarded an 1851 Exhibition Scholarship to study in the United Kingdom. He was admitted to the University of Cambridge's Cavendish Laboratory on Laby's recommendation, and pursued a Doctor of Philosophy degree measuring the ranges of alpha particles emitted from various radioactive substances. He remained at the Cavendish Laboratory for only two years, returning to the University of Melbourne to take up a senior lectureship offered by Laby. In 1925, Rogers was awarded the David Syme Research Prize for the best original research in Biology, Physics, Chemistry, or Geology. However the Cambridge examiners were less impressed with his research, and awarded him a Master of Science degree instead of a PhD. He continued research and published papers, and ultimately was awarded a Doctor of Science degree in 1945. He taught physics to medicine students, writing a text book, Physics for Medical Students (1933).

== Second World War ==
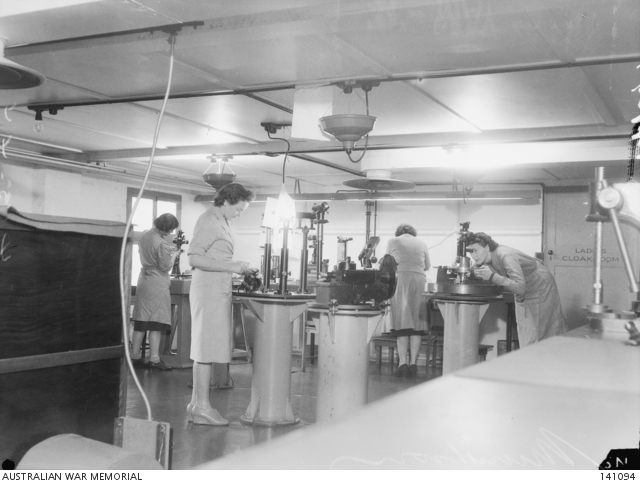
Women munitions workers building prisms of dial sights and range finders

After the outbreak of the Second World War in September 1939, the Australian government had made arrangements for the manufacture of 2-pounder anti-tank guns, 25-pounder gun-howitzers and 3.7-inch anti-aircraft guns in Australia. These plans were thrown awry in June 1940 by the Fall of France. The need for the British to re-equip the British Expeditionary Force after its losses of equipment meant that optical sights they required could no longer be procured from British or North American sources and without them the weapons would be almost useless. The only solution was to make them in Australia. On 26 July, the Director of Ordnance Production, Laurence Hartnett, called upon the physicists at the University of Melbourne for help. An Optical Munitions Panel (later called the Scientific Instruments and Optical Panel) was established, with Laby as its chairman and Rogers as its secretary and executive officer.

There was no manufacturer of suitable glass in Australia; few, if any, skilled workers with experience in grinding and polishing optical glass; and an acute shortage of instrument makers who could make the required metal parts. The manufacturing tolerances required were two orders of magnitude greater than those required for the manufacture of aircraft or spectacles. The Americans could not supply glass, but the National Bureau of Standards provided Australian Consolidated Industries with assistance in setting up glass manufacture in Australia. Lens making facilities were established in Melbourne and Hobart. Cerium oxide was imported from Canada to polish the lenses and was subsequently produced in Australia. By 1941, optical sights were being manufactured in Australia. The panel was dissolved on 6 December 1945, after the war ended. Rogers later wrote an unpublished history of the panel, which was deposited in the National Archives of Australia.

== Later life ==
After the war ended, Rogers was appointed warden of the University of Melbourne's Mildura branch on 5 August 1946. He wrote a short history of the branch. He returned to the Parkville campus in 1950 as the dean of graduate studies and warden of overseas students. He retired in 1963. He died in Heidelberg on 23 July 1977 and his remains were cremated.
