= Igor Aharonovich =

Australian physicist and materials engineer (born 1982)

- Born: 1982 (age 43–44); Moscow, Russian Soviet Federative Socialist Republic, Soviet Union
- Education: University of Melbourne, Technion - Israel Institute of Technology
- Scientific career
- Fields: Physics, nanotechnology, nanophotonics quantum information
- Workplaces: University of Technology Sydney

Igor Aharonovich (born 1982) is an Australian physicist and materials engineer. He is a professor at the School of Mathematical and Physical Sciences at the University of Technology Sydney (UTS). Igor investigates optically active defects in solids, with an overarching goal to identify new generation of ultra-bright solid state quantum emitters. His main contributions include discovery of new color centers in diamond and hexagonal boron nitride as well as development of new methodologies to engineer nanophotonic devices from these materials.

== Career ==
Igor received his B.Sc. (2005) and M.Sc. (2007) from the department of Materials Engineering at the Technion - Israel Institute of Technology under the supervision of Prof Yeshayahu Lifshitz. He then moved to Australia to pursue his PhD at the University of Melbourne under the supervision of Prof Steven Prawer. During his PhD, Igor studied new color centers in diamond and discovered the brightest single-photon source known at that time. After completion of his PhD in December 2010, Igor moved to Harvard for two years of postdoctoral training in the group of Prof Evelyn Hu.

In 2013, he returned to Australia to establish the nanophotonics research group at UTS. Igor was promoted to Associate Professor in 2015 and to a full Professor in 2018. His group explores new quantum emitters in wide bandgap materials and aims to fabricate quantum nanophotonic devices on a single chip for next generation of quantum computing, quantum cryptography and quantum bio-sensing. In 2016 Aharonovich lead his team to discover the first quantum emitters in 2D materials that operates at room temperature based on defects on defects in hBN. Aharonovich co-authored over 200 peer reviewed publications, including one of the most cited reviews on diamond photonics and more recently wrote a road map for solid state single-photon sources.

In 2020, in collaboration with Prof V Dyakonov, Igor and his team discovered new optically active spin defects in hBN, the negatively charged boron vacancy. This discovery paved the way to the emerging field of quantum sensing with 2D materials.

== Outreach ==
In 2019, Igor co-founded (together with Andrea Armani, Orad Reshef, Mikhail Kats, Rachel Grange, Riccardo Sapienza and Sylvain Gigan) the inaugural online photonics conference - Photonics Online Meetup. The meeting attracted over 1100 attendees globally and was highlighted by top science outlets. It is running twice a year since then and the meeting format was adapted by other photonics societies around the world.

Since 2020, Igor is also the outreach director of the ARC Centre of Excellence for Transformative Meta Optical Systems.

== Honors and awards ==
- 2024 Fellow of the SPIE
- 2023 ACS Photonics Young Investigator Award
- 2020 Fellow of the Optical Society
- 2020 The Kavli foundation early career lectureship in materials science
- 2019 CN Yang Award – honors young researchers with prominent research achievements in physics in the Asia Pacific region.
- 2018 Australian Academy of Science runner-up for APEC Science Prize (ASPIRE)
- 2017 Finalist, Macquarie University Eureka Prize for Outstanding Early Career Researcher
- 2017 IUPAP Young Scientist Award for the Commission on Laser Physics and Photonics
- 2017 Pawsey Medal
- 2016 IEEE Photonics Young Investigator Award
- 2016 David Syme Research Prize
- 2016 Humboldt Research Fellowship for experienced researchers
- 2015 New South Wales Young Tall Poppy Award
- 2013 Geoff Opat Early Career Researcher Prize from The Australian Optical Society
