= Burnet Institute =

Australian medical research institute

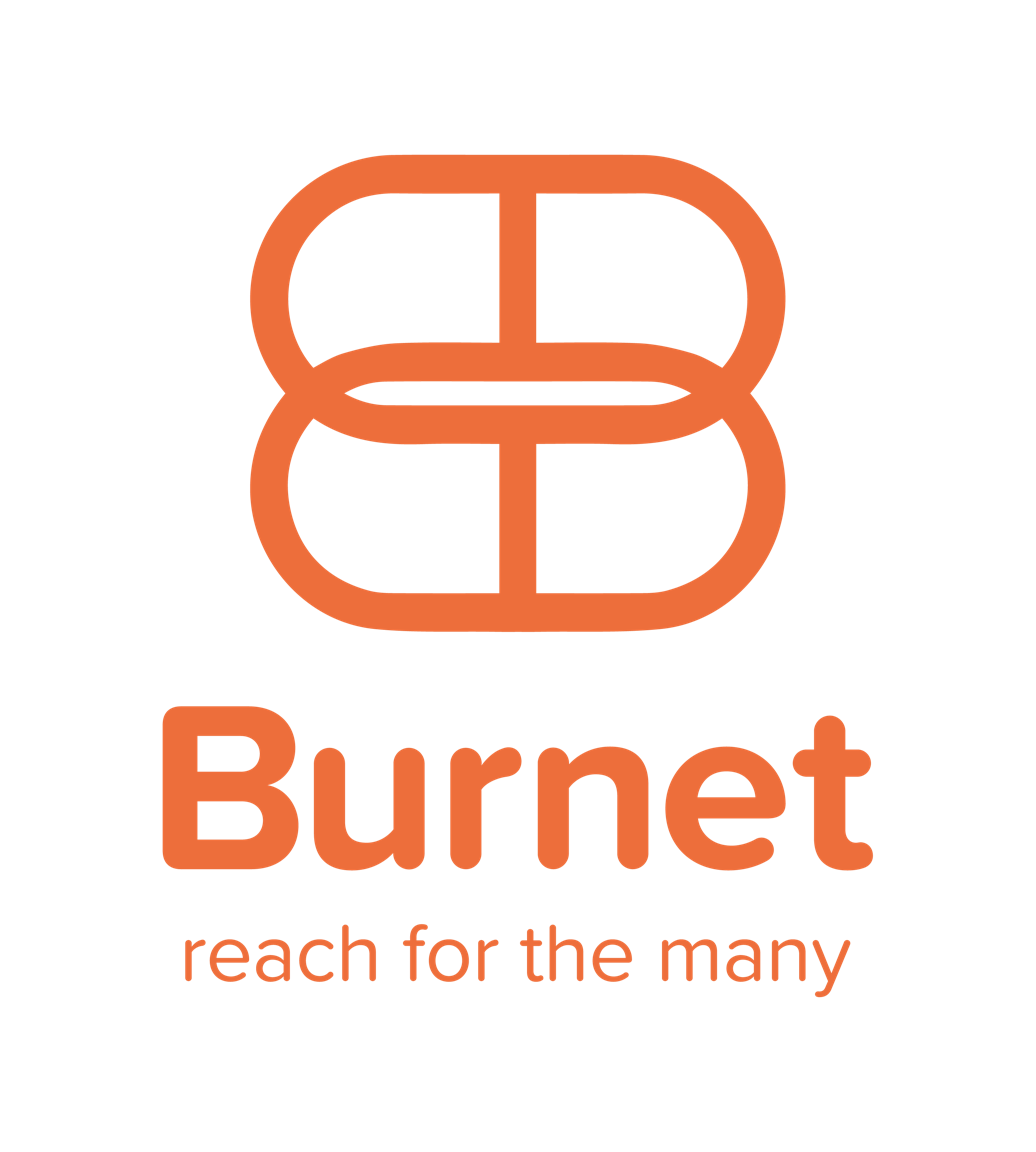
- Motto: Medical research. Practical action
- Established: 1986; 40 years ago
- Mission: Medical research, education and public health
- Chair: Mary Padbury
- Director and CEO: Brendan Crabb AC
- Faculty: University of Melbourne; Monash University
- Staff: approx. 450
- Key people: Ian Gust AO (1970–1990); John Mills (1992–2002); Steve Wesselingh (2002–2007); Mark Hogarth (2007–2008)
- Budget: A$39 million (2015)
- Formerly called: The Queen’s Memorial Infectious Disease Hospital, Fairfield Hospital; Macfarlane Burnet Centre for Medical Research; Macfarlane Burnet Institute for Medical Research and Public Health; Austin Research Institute (merged in 2002)
- Location: Commercial Road, Prahran, Melbourne, Victoria, Australia
- Website: www.burnet.edu.au

The Burnet Institute is an Australian medical institute that combines medical research in the laboratory and the field, with public health action to address major health issues affecting disadvantaged communities in Australia, and internationally.

As of 2011, the institute was home to more than 450 medical researchers, working across six main themes: infectious diseases; maternal and child health; sexual and reproductive health; alcohol and other drugs harm reduction; immunity, vaccines and immunisation; and the health of young people.

With a head office located in Commercial Road, Prahran, Victoria, the institute delivers public health programs across four continents including Africa, Oceania, and Asia and is led by its director and chief executive officer, Professor Brendan Crabb AC, an immunologist.

== Current research ==
Burnet Institute has particular expertise in infectious diseases (especially HIV, hepatitis viruses, influenza and malaria) and in understanding the immune responses to these infections. Their work also focuses on sexual health, drug and alcohol use, both in risky behaviours associated with infectious diseases and as major health problems in their own right. Translating new knowledge into tangible and practical health outcomes is also a major focus of the institute.

The Institute grew out of the Virus Laboratory at Queen's Memorial Infectious Disease Hospital, Fairfield Hospital and was founded in 1986, named in honour of Sir Frank Macfarlane Burnet as the Macfarlane Burnet Centre for Medical Research, Burnet was a Laureate of the 1960 Nobel Prize for Medicine. The institute's official name is the Macfarlane Burnet Institute for Medical Research and Public Health, more commonly known as the Burnet Institute. In 2002, the Austin Research Institute merged with the Burnet Institute.

== See also ==
- Health in Australia
- Ian Gust
