= Guy White =

Australian physicist (1925–2018)

Guy Kendall White AM FAA (1925–2018) was an Australian physicist who specialised in low-temperature physics.

In the 1940s, White was part of what has been described as "the elite cryogenics group of doctorate researchers" at the Clarendon Laboratory at Oxford University.

White served as the chief research scientist of Australia's Commonwealth Scientific and Industrial Research Organisation (CSIRO) from 1969 to 1990.

In 1959, White published his textbook Experimental Techniques in Low-Temperature Physics. This book has been described in 2023 as "still the go-to text" in this field.

White was awarded the David Syme Research Prize by the University of Melbourne in 1966. He was elected a Fellow of the Australian Academy of Science in 1970.

In 2000, White was appointed a Member of the Order of Australia in the General Division for his contributions to physics.
