= Virginia Zakian =

American biologist

- Education: Cornell University; Yale University
- Known for: Molecular Biology; Telomeres; Chromosome Instability
- Scientific career
- Fields: Biology; Molecular Biology
- Workplaces: Princeton University; University of Washington; Fred Hutchinson Cancer Research Center
- Doctoral students: Wai-Hong Tham
- Other notable students: Catherine Freudenreich

Virginia Zakian is the Harry C. Wiess Professor in the Life Sciences in the Department of Molecular Biology at Princeton University. She is the director of the Zakian Lab, which has done important research in topics such as telomere-binding protein, telomere recombination, and telomere position effects, at Princeton University. She is a fellow at the American Academy of Microbiology and the American Association for the Advancement of Science., and is an elected member of the National Academy of Sciences (2018). Zakian served as the chair of "Princeton's Task force on the Status of Women Faculty in the Natural Sciences and Engineering at Princeton" from 2001-2003, in 2003 Zakian became Princeton University's representative to Nine Universities, Gender Equity Analysis She was elected as a member of the American Academy of Arts and Sciences in 2019.

== Education and career ==
Zakian completed her A.B. in Biology at Cornell University, graduating cum laude and with distinction in all subjects, in 1970. Zakian went on to pursue graduate work in Biology at Yale University, while she was working on her Ph.D. (1970–1973) she received a NSF predoctoral fellowship. In 1975, Zakian completed her Ph.D. in Biology, her thesis was supervised by Joseph G. Gall and concerned "DNA replication in Drosophila." Zakian served as a postdoctoral fellow at Princeton University from 1975–1976, during this time she conducted research on "animal virus replication" with Dr. AJ Levine. Later in 1976, Zakian continued her postdoctoral research at the University of Washington where she worked on research concerning "yeast DNA Replication" with Dr. WL Fangman.

In 1978, Zakian joined the Fred Hutchinson Cancer Research Center as an assistant member, Zakian was promoted to the position of an "associate member" in 1984 and to the position of"full member" in 1987. During her time at the Fred Hutchinson Cancer Research Center, Zakian published or co-published around sixty articles in peer-reviewed journals like Nature (journal), Cell (journal), Proceedings of the National Academy of Sciences of the United States of America and the Journal of Molecular Biology. Additionally, during her stay at Fred Hutchinson, Zakian served as either an editor, associate editor or member of the editorial board of journals such as: Plasmid (1986–90), Chromosoma (1990–), J. Exptl. Zoology (1991–96), Trends in Cell Biology (1991–97), Molecular and Cellular Biology (1992–98), Genes to Cells (1994–98).

In 1995, Zakian was appointed as a professor in the Department of Molecular Biology at Princeton University. Zakian was awarded the Harry C. Wiess Professor in the Life Sciences in the Department of Molecular Biology in the year 2000, a position that she holds to this day. Zakian served as the chair of "Princeton's Task force on the Status of Women Faculty in the Natural Sciences and Engineering at Princeton." from 2001-2003, in 2003 Zakian became Princeton University's representative to Nine Universities, Gender Equity Analysis

== Research Area ==
Zakian has published 150 papers in peer-reviewed journals throughout her career. Most of Zakian's research concerns telomeres, which are "the region[s] of repetitive nucleotide sequences at each end of a chromatid, which protects the end of the chromosome from deterioration or from fusion with neighboring chromosomes." Zakian's lab " uses a combination of genetic, biochemical, and cell biological approaches to identify proteins that affect telomeres and to determine their mechanism of action." One of the lab's "major goal[s] is to understand how telomeres, the physical ends of chromosomes, contribute to chromosome stability."

Zakian, along with GM Dani, "were the first to construct and characterize a linear artificial chromosome." in 1983. This work, along with another related study helped to introduce the "use ciliate telomeres to generate linear yeast episomes, a strategy that began the molecular era of yeast telomere biology" Zakian, working with a team of other researchers in the paper "Position effect at S. cerevisiae telomeres: reversible repression of Pol II transcription" (Gottschling et al. 1990 Cell) "discovered telomere position effect, TPE, the transcriptional repression of genes near telomeres in budding yeast." In 1994, Zakian, along with Schulz, "identified the Pif1p DNA helicase as an inhibitor of telomere lengthening and especially of telomere formation." In "Pif1p helicase, a catalytic inhibitor of telomerase in yeast." a team of researchers, including Zakian, found that "Pif1p-like helicases are found in diverse organisms, including humans" and that "Pif1p is the prototype member of a helicase subfamily" The team proposed that "Pif1p-mediated inhibition of telomerase promotes genetic stability by suppressing telomerase-mediated healing of double-strand breaks." Ivessa, Zhou and Zakian later discovered another, "highly connected," member of Pif1p's "helicase subfamily" called Rrm3p. In their paper they found that both Pif1p and Rrm3p both "affected rDNA replication but had opposing effects on fork progression." On the one hand, "Pif1p helped maintain the replication fork progression" while "Rrm3p appears to be the replicative helicase for rDNA as it acted catalytically to promote fork progression throughout the rDNA."

== Selected publications ==
- Zakian, Virginia (8 December 1995). "Telomeres: Beginning to Understand the End". Science. 270 (5242): 1601–1607. Bibcode:1995Sci...270.1601Z. doi:10.1126/science.270.5242.1601. PMID 7502069. S2CID 26674893.
- Zakian, Virginia; Dani GM (June 1983). "Mitotic and meiotic stability of linear plasmids in yeast". PNAS. 80 (11): 3406–10. Bibcode:1983PNAS...80.3406D. doi:10.1073/pnas.80.11.3406. PMC 394052. PMID 6344082.
- Zakian, Virginia; Gottschling DE (24 October 1986). "Telomere proteins: specific recognition and protection of the natural termini of Oxytricha macronuclear DNA". Cell. 47 (2): 195–205. doi:10.1016/0092-8674(86)90442-3. PMID 3094961. S2CID 9999407.
- Zakian, Virginia; Daniel E. Gottschling; Oscar M. Aparicio; Barbara L. Billington (16 November 1990). "Position effect at S. cerevisiae telomeres: Reversible repression of Pol II transcription". Cell. 63 (4): 751–762. doi:10.1016/0092-8674(90)90141-z. PMID 2225075. S2CID 21940834.
- Zakian, Virginia; Boulé, JB; Vega, LR (3 November 2005). "The yeast Pif1p helicase removes telomerase from telomeric DNA". Nature. 438 (7064): 57–61. Bibcode:2005Natur.438...57B. doi:10.1038/nature04091. PMID 16121131. S2CID 4411655.
