= Cynthia Whitchurch =

Australian microbiologist and eDNA researcher

External videos
- "Professor Cynthia Whitchurch FAA", Australian Academy of Science, 27 May 2019
- Welcome to the Data Arena, Fairfax Media, 12 April 2016

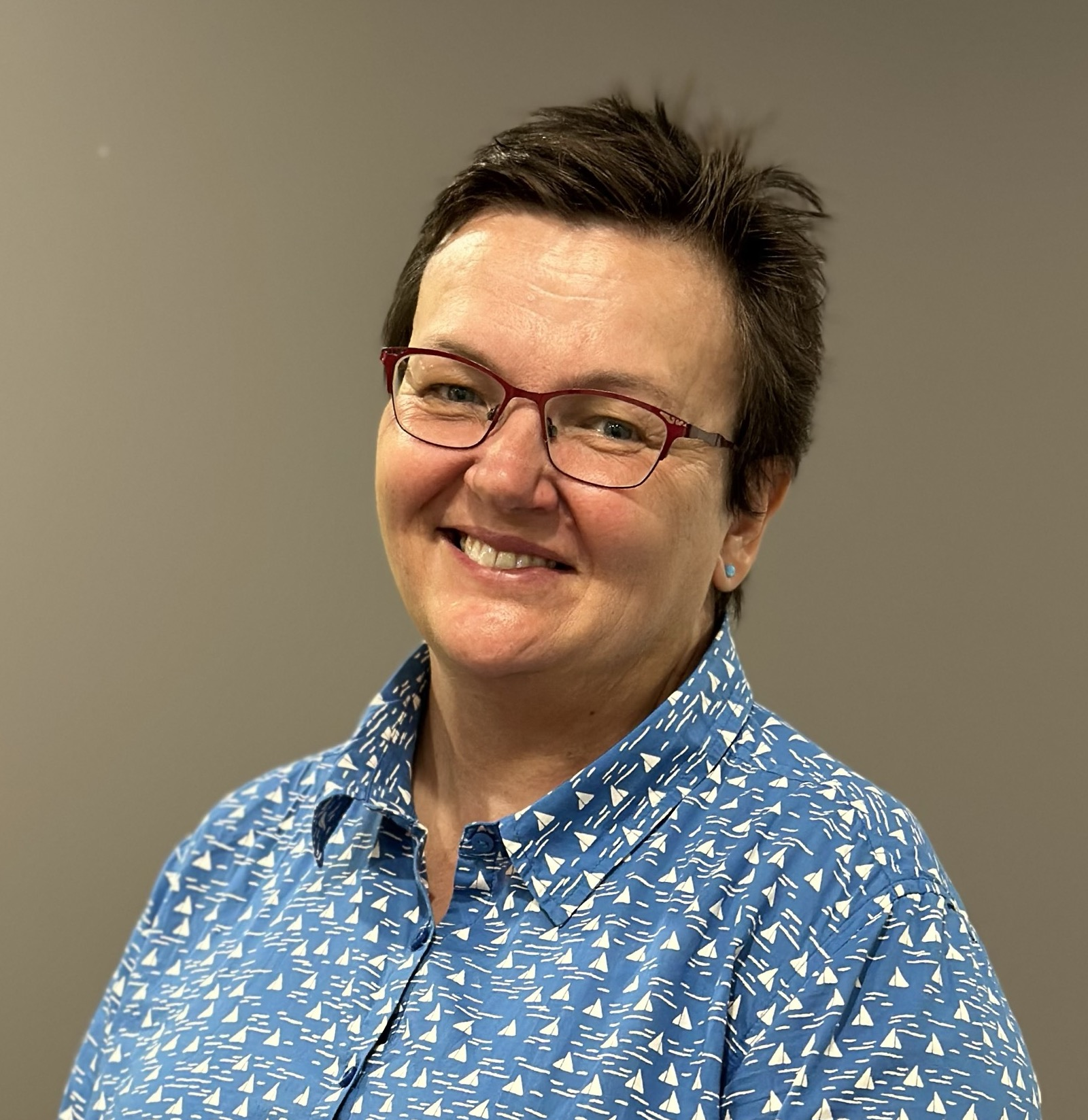

Cynthia B. Whitchurch FAA is an Australian microbiologist. Whitchurch is the research director of the Biofilm Biology cluster at the Singapore Centre For Environmental Life Sciences Engineering (SCELSE) and a professor at the School Of Biological Sciences at Nanyang Technological University (NTU), Singapore. She was previously a research group leader at the Quadram Institute on the Norwich Research Park in the United Kingdom and the founding director of the Microbial Imaging Facility and a Research Group Leader in the Institute of Infection, Immunity and Innovation (The ithree institute) at the University of Technology Sydney (UTS) in New South Wales.

Whitchurch studies bacteria and the ways in which their behavior coordinates to form biofilms, an area with importance for the treatment of infection and the use of antibiotics. Whitchurch became a fellow of the Australian Academy of Science in 2019, in recognition of her discovery that DNA plays a novel role in nature that is unrelated to its roles in genetic functioning.

Her research focuses on alternate bacterial lifestyles, including biofilms and cell wall deficiency, and on developing innovative approaches to control biofilms and combat infection. Whitchurch determined that extracellular DNA (eDNA) is essential to and promotes the self-organization of biofilms. This information is credited with creating a paradigm shift in the understanding of biofilm biology.

== Education ==
Whitchurch attended the University of Queensland, where she completed a B.Sc. with Honors in 1989 and her PhD in 1994. She then continued with postdoctoral training at the University of Queensland from 1995 to 2001. In 2001 Whitchurch undertook further training at the University of California, San Francisco, returning to Australia in 2004.

== Career ==
In 2004, Whitchurch established her own research group in the Department of Microbiology at Monash University. University of Technology Sydney then recruited Whitchurch in 2008, where she led a research team that is part of the Institute of Infection, Immunity and Innovation (The ithree institute). In 2019, Whitchurch moved from Australia to join the Quadram Institute in the United Kingdom.

In 2024, Whitchurch joined SCELSE as the research director for the Biofilm Biology cluster. At NTU, she is a professor at the School of Biological Sciences and leads a research team investigating how bacteria produce and utilize extracellular DNA and other biofilm matrix components, as well as how bacteria colonize host tissues and transition into cell-wall-deficient lifestyles to tolerate antibiotics. This research will further the mechanistic understanding of biofilm development, host colonization, and antimicrobial resistance.

Her team employs a range of techniques, including molecular biology, large-scale mutant library screens, high-throughput drug library screens, infection models, biofilm models, tissue and organoid culture, fluorescence microscopy, super-resolution microscopy, live-cell imaging, histology, and fluorescence in situ hybridization.

== Research ==
Whitchurch contributed to the discovery of novel roles for DNA unrelated to its genetic function, including the discovery in 2002 that extracellular DNA (eDNA) is required for building multicellular bacterial communities known as biofilms. Whitchurch's discovery that extracellular DNA (eDNA) is essential to and promotes the self-organization of biofilms is credited with creating a paradigm shift in the understanding of biofilm biology.

At the Singapore Centre For Environmental Life Sciences Engineering (SCELSE), Whitchurch leads a research team focusing on alternate bacterial lifestyles, including biofilms and cell wall deficiency. Her work aims to develop innovative approaches to control biofilms and combat infection. She examines how bacteria produce and utilize extracellular DNA and other biofilm matrix components, how complex collective behaviours involved in biofilm development and expansion are coordinated, and how bacteria colonize host tissues. Additionally, her research explores how bacteria transition into cell-wall deficient lifestyles, allowing them to tolerate antibiotics. This research will further our mechanistic understanding of these biological processes and their contribution to biofilm development, host colonization, infection, and antimicrobial resistance.

One of the bacteria that Whitchurch studies is Pseudomonas aeruginosa, a common bacterium which has developed a dangerous antibiotic-resistant strain or superbug. P. aeruginosa thrives on implanted devices such as catheters, and is a significant cause of hospital-acquired infections. P. aeruginosa also forms potentially life-threatening biofilms in the lungs of cystic fibrosis patients.

In addition to using sophisticated microscopes, Whitchurch and her team have developed computer programs to analyze data to segment, identify, track and analyse the movements of bacterial cells. They have used the UTS "data arena" to create interactive 360-degree 3-dimensional computational displays representing the behavior of bacterial cells. Colour-coding cells according to the speed at which they move, and studying the ways in which bacteria move across surfaces, helps Whitchurch to visualize behaviors in new ways. Recognizing that P. aeruginosa tends to create and follow pathways (a process known as stigmergy) has led her to experiment with the use of furrowed surfaces in catheters. This appears to disrupt the movement of the bacteria and may help to prevent infection.

Her team at SCELSE employs a range of techniques including molecular biology, large-scale mutant library screens, high-throughput drug library screens, infection models, biofilm models, tissue and organoid culture, fluorescence microscopy, super-resolution microscopy, live-cell imaging, histology, and fluorescence in situ hybridization to carry out their research.

Round cells are viable until explosive cell lysis of P. aeruginosa

In 2016, Whitchurch, Lynne Turnbull and other researchers from Australia, Japan and Switzerland discovered that the bacterium P. aeruginosa can actively explode, widely distributing its contents when it dies. Its protein, DNA, and virulence factors then become available to other bacterium and support the formation of increasingly dangerous biofilms. A particular gene appears to support both this explosive cell lysis and the formation of biofilms. This suggests possibilities for treatment.

"The normal bacteria look like little rods or pills," says Whitchurch. "One day, as we looked under the microscope, we saw one of the cells turn from a hard, structured rod into a round, soft ball. Within a few more seconds, it then violently exploded - it's amazing how quickly it happens and is likely the reason it hasn't been observed before."

== Awards and recognition ==
Whitchurch received the R Douglas Wright Career Development Award (2004–2008) from the National Health and Medical Research Council. In 2009 she was awarded an NHMRC Senior Research Fellowship.

In 2017 Whitchurch was awarded the David Syme Research Prize, an award recognizing "the best original research in biology, physics, chemistry or geology, produced in Australia during the preceding two years". She was the first woman in more than 30 years to receive the prize.

In 2019 Whitchurch was elected to the Australian Academy of Science.

== Media ==
Whitchurch's research on biofilms was featured by the Australian Broadcasting Corporation in 2002 and 2013 and The Australian in 2019.
