= Cecil Ernest Eddy =

Australian radiological physicist (1900–1956)

- Born: 21 June 1900; Albury, New South Wales
- Died: 27 June 1956 (aged 56); Subiaco, Western Australia
- Education: University of Melbourne
- Known for: X-Ray detection of impurities in minerals
- Awards: David Syme Research Prize
- Scientific career
- Fields: Radiology
- Workplaces: Commonwealth X-ray and Radium Laboratory

Cecil Ernest Eddy (21 June 1900 – 27 June 1956) was an Australian radiologist and physicist who pioneered X-Ray techniques for studying minerals and treating cancer. He was the director of the Commonwealth X-ray and Radium Laboratory from 1935 until his death in 1956.

== Biography ==
Cecil Ernest Eddy was born in Albury, New South Wales, on 21 June 1900, the son of Alfred Eddy, a primary schoolteacher, and his wife Samuelina, née Evans. He was educated in various schools in Victoria, and in 1918 joined the Victorian Education Department as a junior schoolteacher at Wangaratta High School. In 1920 he entered the University of Melbourne, where he earned his BSc and DipEd degrees in 1923. That year he was granted leave to remain at the University of Melbourne and study physics under Professor T. H. Laby. He wrote his MSc thesis on X-ray spectroscopy.

In 1926, Eddy became a senior science master at Geelong College, but decided he preferred being a researcher. He accepted an offer from the University of Melbourne, paid back his bond to the Education Department, and continued his research into using X-rays for chemical analysis. He was awarded a Rockefeller Fellowship to study at the University of Cambridge's Cavendish Laboratory under Sir Ernest Rutherford. Before departing for the UK he married Letitia Isabella Reid at the registry office in Collins Street, Melbourne, on 19 August 1927.

Not finding Cambridge to his liking, Eddy returned to the University of Melbourne after just one year, and he and Laby produced a series of papers on the use of X-rays to detect impurities in minerals. It was for this work that Eddy was awarded his DSc in 1930, and the David Syme Research Prize the following year. Eddy became a fellow of the British Institute of Physics in 1931, and served as president of its Australian branch from 1948 to 1949. In 1935, he was appointed the director of the Commonwealth X-ray and Radium Laboratory, a position he held until his death.

The British Society of Radiographers made Eddy an honorary member in 1945, and he became a founding fellow of the Australasian Institute of Radiography in 1950. He also became an honorary member of the College of Radiologists in 1950, and the Faculty of Radiologists, London, in 1952. He served on the council of the National Association of Testing Authorities from when it was established in 1946, and from 1947 was the chairman of the National Health and Medical Research Council's standing committee on X-rays.

In 1956, Eddy was elected chairman of the United Nations' scientific committee on the effects of atomic radiation. He was also appointed a member of the Atomic Weapons Tests Safety Committee, which was set up to monitor the British nuclear tests at Maralinga. As such he viewed the Operation Mosaic tests in Western Australia in June 1956. On the way back to Melbourne he collapsed in Perth, and was taken to St John of God Subiaco Hospital, where he died on 27 June 1956. The cause of death was recorded as lobar pneumonia with myocarditis and septicaemia. His remains were cremated. He was survived by his wife and two sons.
