= Andrea Morello =

Italian professor of quantum computing (born 1972)

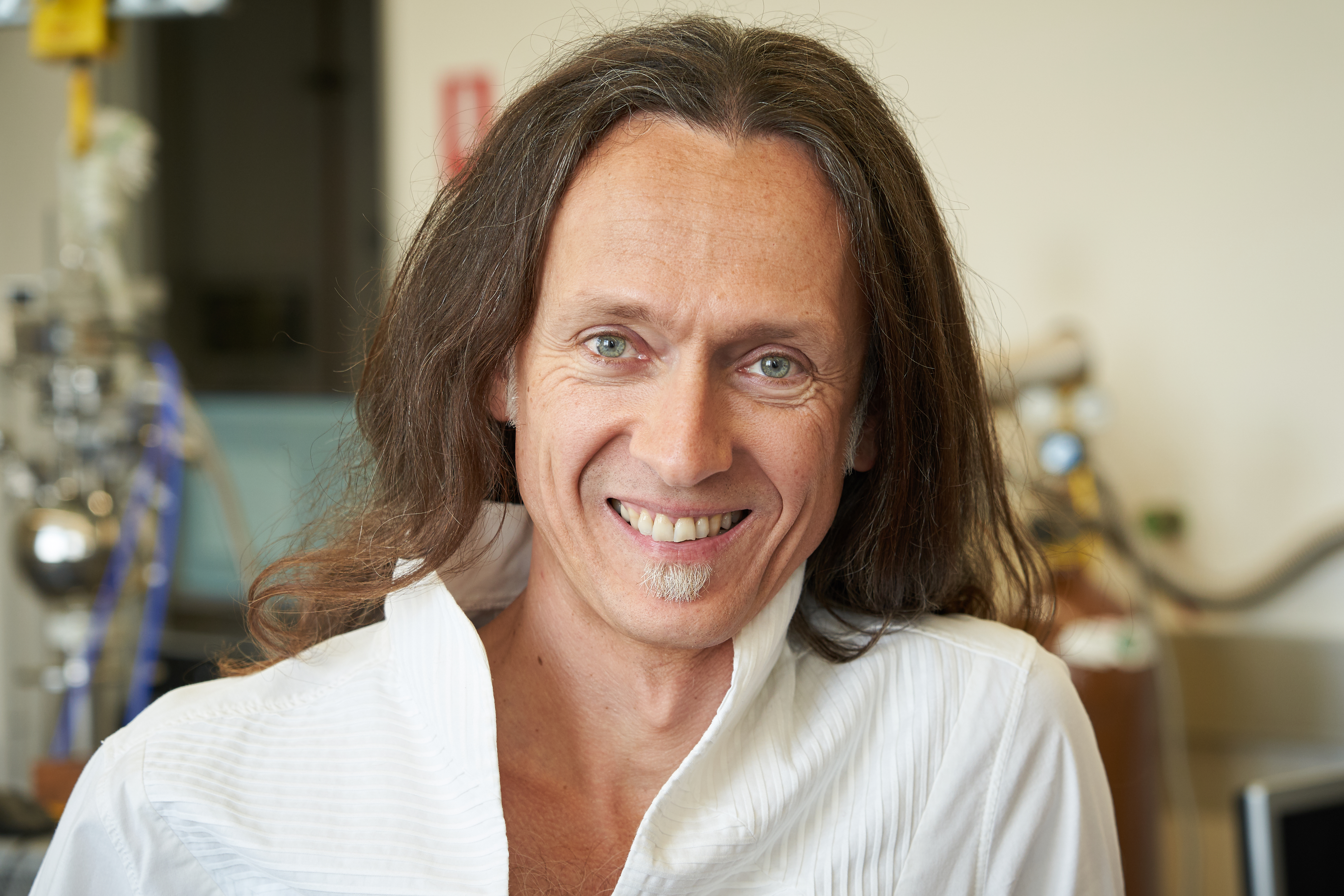
- Morello in 2019
- Born: Andrea Morello; 26 June 1972 (age 54); Pinerolo, Italy
- Education: Leiden University (PhD)
- Awards: Eureka Prize for Scientific Research (2011); Malcolm Macintosh Prize for Physical Scientist of the Year (2013); David Syme Research Prize (2013); NSW Science and Engineering Award for Emerging Research (2014); Fellow of the American Physical Society(2016); Rolf Landauer and Charles H Bennett Award in Quantum Computing (2017); Fellow of the Royal Society of New South Wales (2017)
- Scientific career
- Fields: Quantum physics; Electrical engineering
- Workplaces: University of British Columbia; University of New South Wales
- Thesis: Quantum spin dynamics in single-molecule magnets (2004)
- Doctoral advisor: Professor Jos de Jongh
- Website: www.fqt.unsw.edu.au/staff/andrea-morello

Andrea Morello (born 26 June 1972, in Pinerolo, Italy) is the Scientia Professor of Quantum Engineering in the School of Electrical Engineering and Telecommunications at the University of New South Wales, and a Program Manager at the ARC Centre of Excellence for Quantum Computation and Communication Technology (CQC2T). Morello is the head of the Fundamental Quantum Technologies Laboratory at UNSW.

== Education ==
Morello completed his undergraduate degree in electrical engineering at the Politecnico di Torino in Italy in 1998. His research career began at the Grenoble High Magnetic Field Laboratory where he investigated the magnetic phase diagram of high $T_c$ superconductors. He obtained his PhD in experimental physics from the Kamerlingh Onnes Laboratory in Leiden in 2004, during which he explored the quantum dynamics of molecular nanomagnets at low temperatures. Morello spent two years at the University of British Columbia before joining UNSW Sydney in 2006.

== Research ==
Morello's research is primarily focused on designing and building the basic components of a quantum computer using the spins of single atoms in silicon. His team were the first in the world to demonstrate the coherent control and readout of the electron and nuclear spin of an individual phosphorus atom in silicon, and for many years they held the record for the longest quantum memory time for a single qubit in the solid state (35.6 seconds). Morello's research also focuses on using highly coherent spin systems to study the foundations of quantum mechanics.

== Outreach ==
Outside of his research Morello is actively engaged in science outreach and education. He has produced a series of YouTube videos 'The Quantum Around You' and 'Quantum Computing Concepts' to bring the fundamental concepts of quantum physics to a wider audience. Morello also starred in a series of videos produced by YouTuber Derek Muller on his channel Veritasium, explaining the fundamental concepts of quantum computing, with the highest viewed video in this series being watched over 4.4 million times.

== Honours ==
- 2011. Eureka Prize for Scientific Research
- 2013. Malcolm Macintosh Prize for Physical Scientist of the Year (Prime Minister's Prizes) and the David Syme Research Prize
- 2014. NSW Science and Engineering Award for Emerging Research
- 2017. Fellow of the American Physical Society (FAPS) and the inaugural recipient of the Rolf Landauer and Charles H Bennett Award in Quantum Computing
- 2017. Fellow of the Royal Society of NSW and winner of the Pollock Memorial Lectureship
- 2019. Walter Boas Medal
- 2024. Australian Laureate Fellowship
