= Catherine Freudenreich =

American biologist

Catherine H. Freudenreich
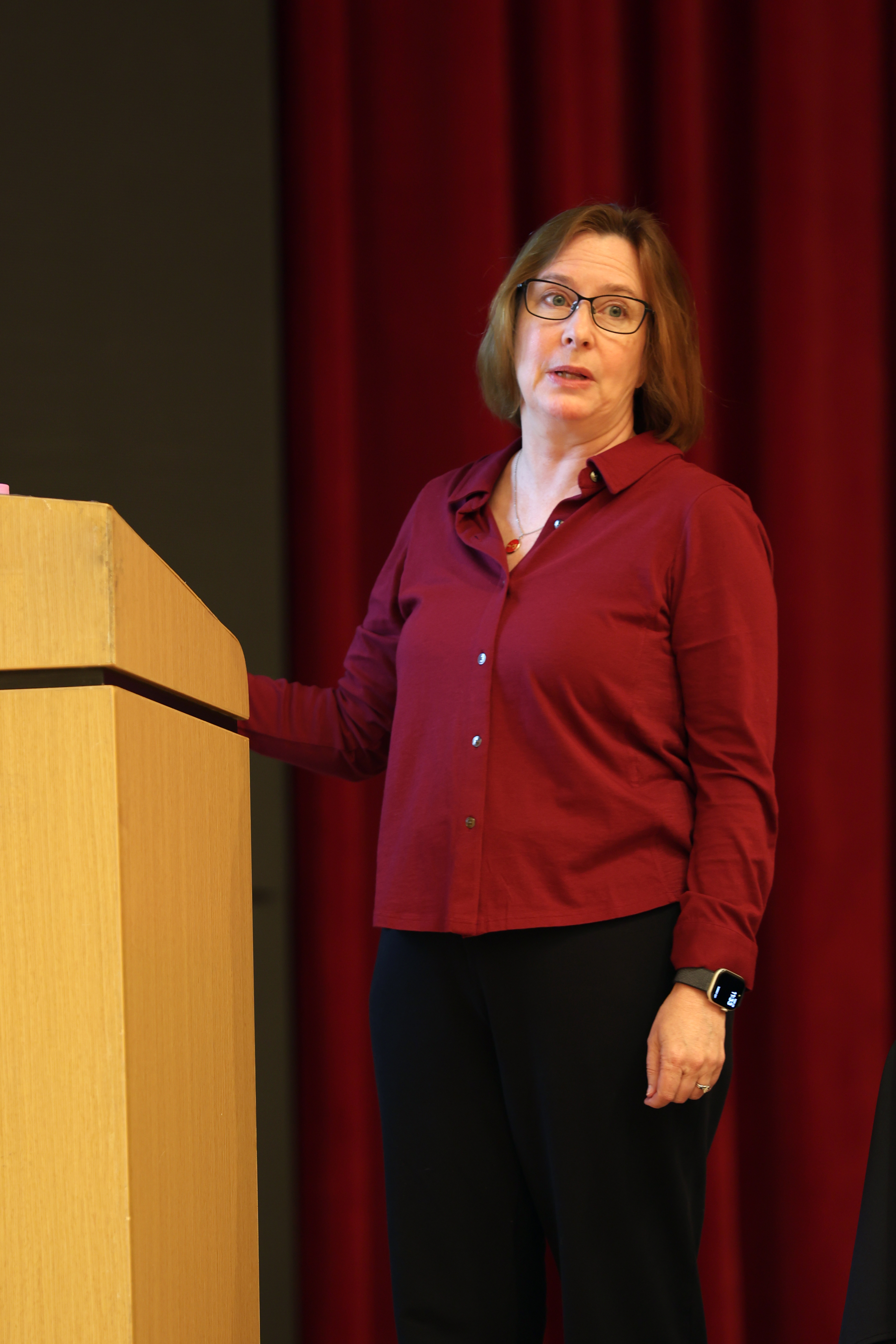
- Education: Rice University (BA) Duke University (PhD)
- Scientific career
- Fields: Molecular biology
- Workplaces: Tufts University
- Doctoral advisor: Kenneth Kreuzer
- Other academic advisors: Virginia Zakian (postdoctoral)
- Website: https://as.tufts.edu/biology/freudenreich-lab

Catherine Freudenreich is an American molecular biologist at Tufts University. From 2019-2025, Freudenreich served as chair of the Department of Biology.

== Life and career ==
Freudenreich spent her childhood in Los Alamos, New Mexico, before attending Rice University, where she graduated in 1988 with a B.A in biology. She received her PhD in 1994 from Duke University, where she studied inhibitor binding sites of Type II topoisomerases in the lab of Kenneth Kreuzer, and continued to do so as a postdoctoral researcher in the same lab. Freudenreich then undertook further postdoctoral research at Princeton University with Virginia Zakian, studying CTG repeated sequences in the yeast genome.

After her postdoctoral studies, Freudenreich was appointed to an assistant professor position in the Department of Biology at Tufts University in 1999. She was promoted to professor in 2015 and chaired the department from 2019-2025.

== Research ==
Freudenreich’s lab studies genome instability in yeast, with the aim of uncovering mechanisms of genetic disease and cancer. In particular, much of her research has focused on conserved trinucleotide repeat sequences, specifically CAG/CTG, and their contributions to genome fragility and instability. Recently, Freudenreich’s group looked at CAG/CTG repeats in Huntington’s disease, finding that the cells’ attempts to repair CAG sequences often lead to large, deleterious deletions.

Freudenreich has also studied how DNA repeat sequences contribute to DNA structures that can cause DNA breaks, and how the cell protects against genomic damage from these mechanisms.

== Selected publications ==
1. Freudenreich, Catherine H.; Kantrow, Sara M.; Zakian, Virginia A. (1998-02-06). "Expansion and Length-Dependent Fragility of CTG Repeats in Yeast". Science. 279 (5352): 853–856. doi:10.1126/science.279.5352.853. ISSN 0036-8075.
2. Lahiri, Mayurika; Gustafson, Tanya L; Majors, Elizabeth R; Freudenreich, Catherine H (2004-07-23). "Expanded CAG Repeats Activate the DNA Damage Checkpoint Pathway". Molecular Cell. 15 (2): 287–293. doi:10.1016/j.molcel.2004.06.034. ISSN 1097-2765.
3. Polleys, Erica J.; Del Priore, Isabella; Haber, James E.; Freudenreich, Catherine H. (2023-04-29). "Structure-forming CAG/CTG repeats interfere with gap repair to cause repeat expansions and chromosome breaks". Nature Communications. 14 (1): 2469. doi:10.1038/s41467-023-37901-2. ISSN 2041-1723.
4. Zhang, Haihua; Freudenreich, Catherine H. (2007-08). "An AT-Rich Sequence in Human Common Fragile Site FRA16D Causes Fork Stalling and Chromosome Breakage in S. cerevisiae". Molecular Cell. 27 (3): 367–379. doi:10.1016/j.molcel.2007.06.012. ISSN 1097-2765. PMC 2144737. PMID 17679088.
5. Kerrest, Alix; Anand, Ranjith P.; Sundararajan, Rangapriya; Bermejo, Rodrigo; Liberi, Giordano; Dujon, Bernard; Freudenreich, Catherine H.; Richard, Guy-Franck (2009-01-11). "SRS2 and SGS1 prevent chromosomal breaks and stabilize triplet repeats by restraining recombination". Nature Structural & Molecular Biology. 16 (2): 159–167. doi:10.1038/nsmb.1544. ISSN 1545-9985.
6. House, Nealia C.M.; Yang, Jiahui H.; Walsh, Stephen C.; Moy, Jonathan M.; Freudenreich, Catherine H. (2014-09-18). "NuA4 Initiates Dynamic Histone H4 Acetylation to Promote High-Fidelity Sister Chromatid Recombination at Postreplication Gaps". Molecular Cell. 55 (6): 818–828. doi:10.1016/j.molcel.2014.07.007. ISSN 1097-2765. PMC 4169719. PMID 25132173.
7. Su, Xiaofeng A.; Freudenreich, Catherine H. (2017-10-03). "Cytosine deamination and base excision repair cause R-loop–induced CAG repeat fragility and instability in Saccharomyces cerevisiae". Proceedings of the National Academy of Sciences. 114 (40). doi:10.1073/pnas.1711283114. ISSN 0027-8424. PMC 5635916. PMID 28923949.

== Awards and honors ==
- FASEB summer conference "Dynamic DNA Structures in Biology" (Chair, 2018; Co-chair, 2016)
- NIH MG panel (2018)
- NIH MGB panel (2017)
- Genetics Society of America (member)
- American Society for Biochemistry and Molecular Biology (member)
