= John David Rogers =

Australian Army officer (1895–1978)

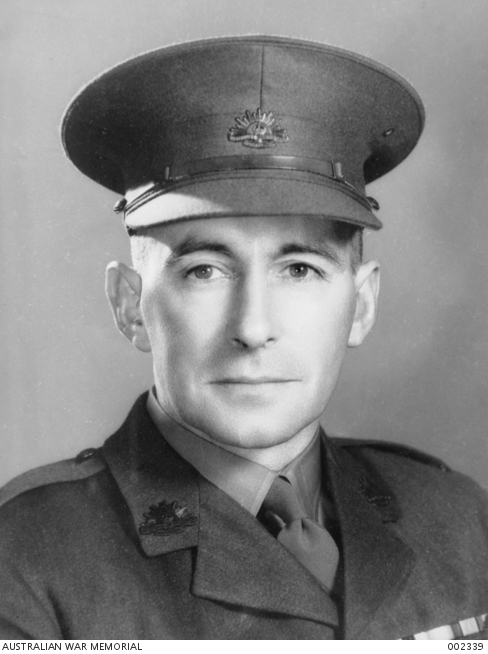
- As a major in July 1940
- Born: 29 April 1895; Penguin, Tasmania
- Died: 10 April 1978 (aged 82); Caulfield, Victoria
- Relatives: James Stanley Rogers (brother)
- Military career
- Branch: Australian Army
- Service years: 1914–1920; 1940–1945
- Rank: Brigadier
- Service number: VX40124
- Conflicts: First World War; Gallipoli campaign; Landing at Anzac Cove; Second Battle of Krithia; Western Front; Battle of Pozieres; Battle of Passchendaele; Battle of Hamel; Hundred Days Offensive; Second World War; Western Desert campaign; Greek campaign; Syria-Lebanon campaign; New Guinea campaign; Borneo campaign
- Awards: Commander of the Order of the British Empire; Military Cross; Mentioned in Despatches; Efficiency Decoration; Croix de Guerre (Belgium)

Brigadier John David Rogers, CBE, MC, ED (29 April 1895 – 10 April 1978) was an Australian Army brigadier. During the First World War he served in the Gallipoli campaign and on the Western Front, where he was awarded the Military Cross. During the Second World War he was the Australian Army's Director of Military Intelligence. He represented Australia at the Japanese surrender at Singapore in September 1945.

A student at the University of Melbourne when the First World War broke out in August 1914, Rogers enlisted in the First Australian Imperial Force (AIF). He served with the 6th Battalion at Gallipoli, where he earned a commission as a second lieutenant, and on the Western Front, where he was promoted to captain. In February 1917 he was seconded to 1st Division Headquarters for training as a staff officer. He served on the general staff of the 1st Division and the Australian Corps under Brigadier General Thomas Blamey. Rogers returned to his studies after the war and became a chemist with the Vacuum Oil Company. He rose through the ranks of the company, becoming assistant general manager for New South Wales in 1935.

During the Second World War, Blamey offered Rogers a position on the new I Corps staff as an intelligence officer, and he joined the Second AIF in June 1940. During the Battle of Greece he supervised the evacuation of the corps from Greece. He became the Australian liaison officer at General Douglas MacArthur's General Headquarters in March 1942 before being appointed the Australian Army's Director of Military Intelligence (DMI) in July. His intelligence section frequently differed with that of GHQ over estimates of Japanese troop strength. In November 1944 he was forced to suspend publication of his Australian Military Forces Weekly Intelligence Review for three months after evidence emerged that it was reaching the Japanese via the Soviet Union's ambassador. After the war he returned to the Vacuum Oil Company as its general manager for New South Wales in 1945, deputy chairman in 1954 and chairman from 1958 to 1959.

== Early life and education ==
John David Rogers was born in Penguin, Tasmania, on 29 April 1895, the second of nine children of James Rogers, a Methodist clergyman, and his wife Agnes née Caldwell. He had an older brother James Stanley Rogers, and younger sisters Agnes, Jean, Ethel, Mill, Lois and Ella. (Another brother died in infancy.) The family moved to Campbells Creek, Victoria, in 1900, and then to Dimboola, Victoria, in 1905.

Rogers was educated at Dimboola School, and then attended Geelong College on a scholarship, and graduated in 1913 as dux of the school. At both Dimboola and Geelong College he participated in the Australian Army Cadets. He was awarded a scholarship to Ormond College at the University of Melbourne. While there, he served in the Melbourne University Rifles.

== Great War ==
=== Gallipoli campaign ===
Rogers's studies were interrupted by the outbreak of the First World War in August 1914. He enlisted in the First Australian Imperial Force (AIF) on 20 August 1914, joining the 6th Battalion, which was part of the 2nd Brigade of the 1st Division. After initial training at Broadmeadows, the 6th Battalion embarked for Egypt on the troop transport HMAT Hororata on 18 October. On 4 April 1915, the 6th Battalion moved to Alexandria, where it embarked on the troop transport SS Galeka. Rogers landed at Gallipoli with the 6th Battalion on Anzac Day, 25 April 1915.

On 5 May, the 2nd Brigade moved to Cape Helles, where the 6th Battalion participated in the Second Battle of Krithia on 8 May, resulting in heavy casualties. The unwounded Rogers was promoted to sergeant. The 6th Battalion returned to the Anzac lodgement. Rogers was promoted to company sergeant major on 5 July and was commissioned as a second lieutenant on 4 August. By September, he was acting as battalion intelligence officer, although this was not formalised until December. The 6th Battalion was evacuated from Anzac on 11 December, but Rogers remained until 17 December. He was promoted to lieutenant on 13 December.

=== Western Front ===
The 6th Battalion returned to Egypt via Lemnos, arriving back in Alexandria on 6 January 1916. In Egypt, Rogers met up with his brother Stan, who was serving with the 14th Battalion. On 10 March, the 6th Battalion moved to defend the Suez Canal, but on 26 March it embarked for France on the troop transport HMT Briton. The first anniversary of Anzac Day was spent in the trenches around Fleurbaix. As battalion intelligence officer, Rogers was in charge of the battalion scout platoon. On 12 June, he led a raid on the German trenches, in the course of which he was lightly wounded. He was awarded the Military Cross. His citation read:

For conspicuous gallantry and determination during a raid on the enemy's trenches. He guided the attack, arranged for passing the wire, and cleared the track for the withdrawal. Some formidable wire was found in a depression in the ground, but he skilfully prepared a sufficient gap in it. His coolness conduced much to the success of the raid.

In the Battle of Pozieres, the 6th Battalion did not participate in the assault, but came in to relieve the 2nd Battalion. Rogers went forward with his battalion commander, Lieutenant Colonel H. G. "Ginger" Bennett. They were able to organise the relief, but the 6th Battalion came under a heavy German barrage. Battalion headquarters was in a dugout that was hit six times. Years later Rogers praised the actions of Bennett, who still visited his companies every day despite the bombardment. The casualties in the battle created vacancies in the establishment, and Rogers was promoted to captain on 23 December. Eight days later he assumed command of B Company.

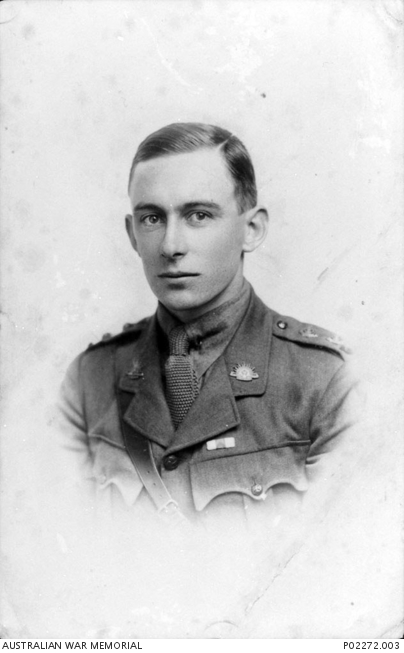
As a lieutenant in 1917

Rogers's time in command of B Company was brief; on 24 February 1917 he was seconded to 1st Division Headquarters for training as a brigade major, the chief of staff of a brigade, on Bennett's recommendation. The 1st Division's GSO1 (the staff officer in charge of the G branch) was Colonel Thomas Blamey, who would henceforth have a profound influence on Rogers's subsequent career. On 18 January 1918, Rogers became the 1st Division GSO3, vice Captain Malcolm Kennedy, who had died of wounds on 2 January. As part of his training, Rogers was seconded to Bennett's 3rd Brigade as the brigade intelligence officer. During the Battle of Menin Road in September, he laid tapes marking the jumping off positions for the 3rd Brigade's attack. He was mentioned in despatches on 28 May 1918.

On 1 June 1918, Lieutenant General John Monash assumed command of the Australian Corps. Blamey became the Corps brigadier general, general staff. In turn, Blamey brought Rogers in as his GSO3 (Operations). In this role Rogers worked under the GSO2 (Operations), Major Richard Casey, and was involved in the planning and execution of the Battle of Hamel, the Battle of Amiens and the Hundred Days Offensive.

Rogers was one of 60 officers and 740 other ranks granted Anzac Leave — two months' furlough in Australia for men who had joined the AIF in 1914. He embarked on the RMS Pannonia on 6 October, which took them to New York and crossed Canada on the Canadian Pacific Railroad. They embarked in Vancouver on the SS Makura and reached Sydney on 22 December, by which time the war was over. His AIF appointment was officially terminated on 21 February 1919. For his service, in addition to his Military Cross, he was awarded the Belgian Croix de Guerre, the 1914–15 Star, British War Medal and the Victory Medal.

== Between the wars ==
In 1919, Rogers returned to his studies at Ormond College, but elected to pursue a Bachelor of Science degree instead of a six-year course in medicine. He wrote a couple of plays, which were performed by the College Dramatic Society, and was president of the Student Representative Council. He was awarded a Mining and metallurgical bursary and the Bloomfleld scholarship, a special award for a returned soldier pursuing a degree. Rogers and his brother Stan paid for their sisters Mill and Ethel to attend the Methodist Ladies' College, Melbourne. He rejoined the Melbourne University Rifles. Men who had served in the AIF retained their wartime rank as an honorary rank, but his rank of captain became substantive on 1 December 1920, and he became second in command of the regiment. On 1 July 1921, he joined the intelligence section of the 3rd Military District.

Rogers met Irene Myrola Rowe, known as Rene, who worked in the Bacteriological School at the University. She had entered the University in 1914. In 1915, she had become the first woman to attend Dookie Agricultural College for a practical year. In April 1918, she became the first woman in Australia to receive a Bachelor of Agricultural Science. She was the only student to receive that degree that year; all the boys had joined the forces. Rogers and Rene were married at the Methodist Church in Balaclava, Victoria, on 14 September 1922, with Rogers's father performing the ceremony. They had three children: David William, Allan John and Judith Ann.

At the time of his wedding, Rogers was unemployed, and the couple lived off Rene's salary until Rogers accepted an offer from his friend Austin Laughlin, who had also been awarded the Military Cross for the June 1916 trench raid, of a job as a chemist at Laughlin's family timber veneer factory. In late 1923, Rogers accepted a position as a chemist with the Vacuum Oil Company at its terminal at Pulpit Point in Sydney, where he was responsible for oil quality, safety and security. He returned to Melbourne in a management position with the company in 1928, and then moved to Perth as assistant general manager there in 1931. He moved back to Sydney in 1935 as Vacuum's assistant general manager for New South Wales, before returning to the head office in Melbourne in 1938. In November 1938, Rogers and Rene took a six-month tour of Vacuum installations in North America. They travelled across Canada in the reverse of the direction Rogers had taken in 1919, stopping at Banff and Niagara Falls on the way, and ultimately visiting Vacuum headquarters at 26 Broadway in New York City. They returned to Melbourne in April 1939.

== Second World War ==
=== Middle East ===
After the outbreak of the Second World War, Blamey was appointed to command the Second Australian Imperial Force and promoted to lieutenant general on 13 October 1939. Rogers decided to enlist, and he negotiated a deal with Vacuum to guarantee him a position when the war was over. In May 1940, he approached Blamey and asked if the Second AIF could use him. As it happened, the government had decided to form another division in the AIF, and to group them into a corps under Blamey's command. Blamey offered Rogers a position on the new I Corps staff as an intelligence officer. According to military historian Gavin Long, intelligence was "a branch which, peculiarly, held little appeal for professional staff officers". Between the wars there was no Intelligence Corps and no training in intelligence. Rogers joined the Second AIF on 1 June 1940, and received the AIF service number VX40124. He was promoted to major on 15 June, and attended a brief intelligence course in Narellan, New South Wales, from 23 June to 3 July before embarking for Palestine on the RMS Strathallan on 13 August. He was appointed GSO2 (Intelligence) on the I Corps staff and promoted to lieutenant colonel on 1 November.

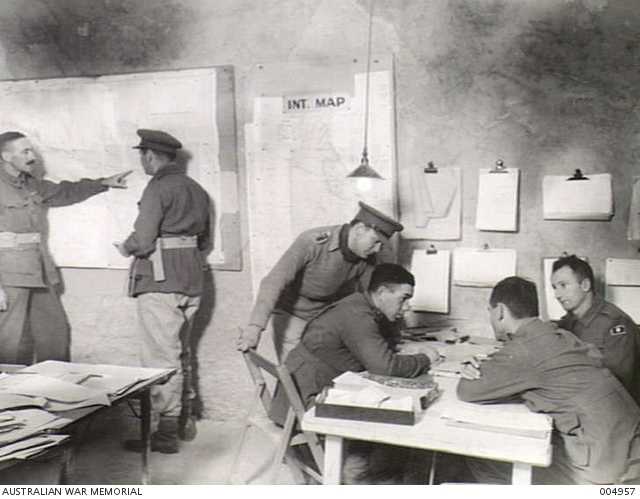
Rogers (left) with 6th Division Headquarters Intelligence Section in an underground cistern during the Battle of Bardia

In December 1940, the 6th Division was sent forward to capture Bardia. I Corps was not yet deployed, but Blamey sent Rogers to the 6th Division as his liaison officer. The 6th Division intelligence staff had drawn up a detailed map of the town and its fortifications, but the size of the garrison was greatly underestimated: the British thought that it consisted of 25,000 at most but in fact there were more than 35,000. Nonetheless, the Australian attack was successful and the town was taken. Rogers delivered lectures on the battle to the I Corps headquarters staff in Gaza and the British Staff College in Haifa. I Corps headquarters assumed responsibility for the defence of Cyrenaica on 15 February, but it was soon ordered to Greece and in turn handed over to Cyrenaica command on 24 February. Rogers noted the appearance of German armoured cars, but no German units were yet identified. These were the first elements of the German Africa Corps.

The I Corps staff embarked for Greece on 27 March, but owing to the Battle of Matapan did not arrive in Athens until two days later. Greece was not yet at war with Germany, and Rogers was disturbed to find German agents monitoring ship arrivals and troop movements. The Germans attacked Greece on 6 April, and I Corps (temporarily named Anzac Corps) assumed control of the battle on 13 April. Rogers was disturbed by the German air superiority and called for air cover but to no avail. On 22 April, Blamey ordered Rogers to take a team of seven officers and supervise the evacuation of the corps from Greece. Blamey had given orders that the Australian nurses of the 2/5th General Hospital were to be evacuated from Greece but the Brigadier D. T. M. Large, the British Director of Medical Services felt that this would be too hazardous. At the urging of the Australian medical liaison officer, Major Ernest Edward "Weary" Dunlop, Rogers arranged for the evacuation of forty Australian and forty British nurses. As at Gallipoli, Rogers was one of the last men out. Along with Major Gordon Hurley and their drivers, they were taken to Crete and then Alexandria by the destroyer HMS Havock. For his service in Greece, Rogers was made an Officer of the Order of the British Empire. His citation read:

Throughout the Grecian campaign, this officer performed most excellent work as GSO Intelligence. He performed particularly gallant work in the evacuation of personnel from the beaches in Greece and his capacity to withstand strain over an extended period was most marked.

On 4 June 1941, Rogers became Senior Liaison Officer, in succession to Lieutenant Colonel Henry Wells; in turn, he was succeeded as GSO2 (Intelligence) at I Corps by Lieutenant Colonel Kenneth Wills. I Corps was alerted to take part in the Syria-Lebanon Campaign. Against the advice of the corps staff, General Sir Henry Maitland Wilson, the British commander in Palestine and Transjordan attempted to exercise command from the King David Hotel in Jerusalem. This proved to be a serious error, as his staff were too remote from the battlefields to exercise the close command required. Regular reports from Rogers and his liaison officers at the front indicated that the Vichy French opposition was stronger than anticipated and had foreknowledge of the British plans. I Corps headquarters was sent for on 18 June, but hard fighting was required before the campaign was brought to a successful conclusion. In November, the British Eighth Army launched Operation Crusader, which recaptured Cyrenaica. Rogers and Lieutenant Colonel Selwyn Porter served as Australian observers and liaison officers.

=== South West Pacific ===
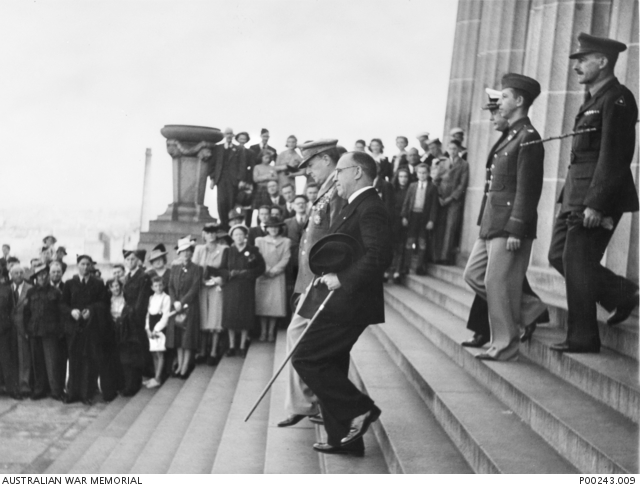
General Douglas MacArthur and the Lord Mayor of Melbourne, Frank Beaurepaire, leave the Shrine of Remembrance in March 1942. Rogers is on the right with US Navy Captain Herbert J. Ray and Colonel LeGrande A. Diller.

Rogers returned to Australia by air, reaching Darwin on 21 January 1942. After a short period of leave, he became Colonel, General Staff (Intelligence), at Home Forces headquarters, located at Ivanhoe Grammar School in Melbourne. This command was responsible for the defence of mainland Australia, and Rogers considered the possibility of Japanese attacks. General Douglas MacArthur arrived in Melbourne on 21 March, and established his General Headquarters (GHQ) at MacRobertson Girls' High School in Melbourne. On 31 March, Blamey appointed Rogers as his liaison officer at GHQ. He was promoted to the temporary rank of colonel on 1 May 1942.

On 1 July 1942, Rogers was appointed the Australian Army's Director of Military Intelligence (DMI). On 1 August, he moved to Advance Allied Land Force Headquarters (LHQ) at the University of Queensland in the Brisbane suburb of Saint Lucia with a nucleus of his staff. This included Major Paul Sadler, who became GSO1 (Coord) and Major Bob Lewis, who became an expert on the Japanese order of battle. Rogers plucked Australian Women's Army Service Corporal Lois McDonald from the typing pool to become his secretary. The LHQ School of Military Intelligence, under Lieutenant Colonel Evan Mander-Jones, moved from Balwyn, Victoria, to Redcliffe, Queensland, in October 1942, and then to Southport, Queensland, in May 1943.

Rogers worked closely with Brigadier General Charles A. Willoughby, the American opposite number at GHQ. However, Willoughby did not consult Rogers; Rogers always had to visit Willoughby. Willoughby did not have access to transcripts of Ultra intelligence produced by the Central Bureau. These were taken by Brigadier General Spencer B. Akin, the Chief Signals Officer at GHQ, to its chief of staff, Major General Richard K. Sutherland. Only Blamey and MacArthur were cleared to see the raw transcripts; Willoughby just received summaries. In contrast, Rogers, who was promoted to brigadier on 1 September 1942, was a trusted member of Blamey's team and had access to all the intelligence that Blamey received. McDonald and Alam O'Halloran, Blamey's secretary, were the only ones permitted to type the summaries of Ultra or Y service messages. Rogers realised that Willoughby tailored the GHQ Weekly Intelligence Summary to what he believed MacArthur would accept, and therefore LHQ intelligence could not rely on GHQ and had to be self-sufficient.

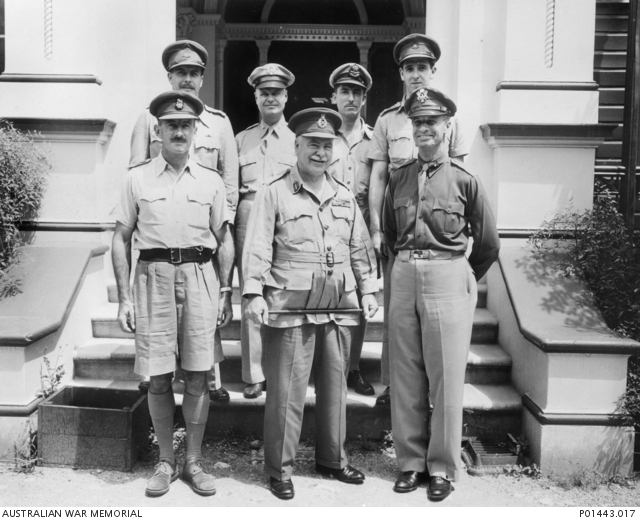
Visit of the Australian Commander in Chief, General Sir Thomas Blamey, to the Central Bureau of Intelligence on 25 February 1944. Front row, left to right: Rogers, Blamey, Spencer B. Akin.

Differences in methodology inevitably resulted in differing appreciations. In October 1942, LHQ estimated that there were 6,000 Japanese troops in the Kokoda-Buna area, whereas Willoughby thought there were just 2,000. Rogers flew to New Guinea on 22 November to assess the situation. He met with Blamey in Port Moresby, Lieutenant General Edmund Herring at Popondetta and Major General George Alan Vasey at Soputa. Based on having flown over the area, Lieutenant General George C. Kenney, the commander of Allied Air Forces, insisted that there were no more than 500 Japanese defenders at Sanananda, but Lewis insisted that there were at least 2,000, based on captured documents. After the battle, more than 2,000 bodies were counted. On returning to Australia, Rogers came down with Malaria and was admitted to the 112th General Hospital in Brisbane for treatment. He was subsequently transferred to the 115th General Hospital in Heidelberg, Victoria, and was not discharged until 19 January 1943. In the meantime, Wills acted as DMI. When Rogers returned in February, Wills became his deputy.

After the Battle of the Bismarck Sea in March 1943, MacArthur issued a communiqué stating that all 22 Japanese ships had been sunk and 15,000 troops killed. At Advance LHQ, Lewis issued an estimate that there were 10,000 troops in the convoy, of whom at least 2,000 survived, and not all ships had been sunk. MacArthur wanted Lewis sacked, but this did not occur, as Lewis was able to demonstrate that he was correct. A more serious issue arose in the landing at Scarlet Beach in September. Willoughby considered Finschhafen to be primarily a transhipment point, and most of the troops there to be from line of communication units. The fall of Lae ended its utility, so he reduced his estimate of the number of Japanese troops in the area to 350. Based on this appreciation, GHQ believed that Finschhafen would be a "pushover". Rogers's staff at Advance LHQ believed otherwise, and came up with a much higher figure of 3,000. In fact, Japanese strength in the area on 22 September was about 5,000. The poor appreciation of the situation led to a delay in sending reinforcements to Finschhafen. The Japanese reinforced and seized the initiative, and set the whole campaign back.

On 29 August 1944, Rogers flew to London via the United States to attend a pair of conferences, one on Far Eastern matters, and another on signals intelligence. At the latter, chaired by Major General Sir Stewart Menzies, Rogers highlighted the important role that signals intelligence was playing in the South West Pacific and that 1,400 military personnel were involved, half of whom were Australian and half American. Rogers pointed out that the Americans would be taking vital equipment, including IBM computers with them and he arranged for replacement equipment to be ordered and a Canadian unit sent to replace the Americans. He visited the battlefields in Normandy and Field Marshal Sir Bernard Montgomery's 21st Army Group headquarters during Operation Market Garden. On the way back to Australia he had talks in Washington, DC, with Major General Clayton Bissell, and in Ottawa with Canada's Director of Military Intelligence, Colonel W. W. (Jock) Murray.

Rogers's report on the Japanese surrender in Singapore

Rogers flew from San Francisco on 16 October 1944 and was back in Brisbane on 28 October. He was immediately confronted by another controversy over estimates of Japanese troop strength, this time in Bougainville. Willoughby estimated that there were 12,000 Japanese present; Lewis thought there were 41,000. The following month a more serious matter arose, forcing Rogers to suspend publication of the Australian Military Forces Weekly Intelligence Review until February 1945: Ultra indicated that the Japanese in Tokyo were receiving copies. The LHQ Intelligence Section moved to Hollandia on 15 December but Rogers remained behind to deal with the issue. Chinese and Soviet diplomats were suspected. Blamey agreed to restrict circulation of the AMF Intelligence Review, leaving the Chinese liaison officers off the distribution list, and to omit any material sourced by Ultra. Suspicion then fell on the Soviet ambassador in Canberra. Rogers rejoined his section in Hollandia on 13 March 1945; six days later it rejoined Advance LHQ on Morotai.

On 15 August 1945, Blamey informed Rogers that he had been chosen to head the Australian mission to South East Asia Command and represent Australia at the official Japanese surrender at Singapore. The ceremony took place on 12 September. Rogers had chosen 120 men from the 1st Parachute Battalion to represent Australia because they had been prepared to rescue Australian prisoners held in Singapore. He returned to Australia on 4 October and his AIF appointment was terminated on 22 November. He was transferred to the Reserve of Officers with the substantive rank of colonel and the honorary rank of brigadier. Blamey recommended his elevation to a Commander of the Order of the British Empire in recognition of his services. This was gazetted on 4 March 1947. Willoughby recommended him for an American award but this was disapproved by the government.

== Later life ==
Rogers returned to the Vacuum Oil Company as its general manager for New South Wales, based in Sydney. He returned to Melbourne as the company's marketing director in 1948. He worked for the company in New York from 1951 to 1952. He returned to Melbourne, where he became deputy chairman of the Australian subsidiary in 1954 and chairman in 1958. He retired in 1959. He also served on the boards of the Moulded Products from 1959 to 1967, Mayne Nickless from 1959 to 1967, David Syme & Co. from 1960 to 1967 and the Trustees, Executors & Agency Co. from 1959 to 1970. He was honorary colonel of the Australian Army Intelligence Corps from 1956 to 1961, and chief executive officer of the building committee of the Victorian Arts Centre from 1959 to 1971. In this role he oversaw the construction of the National Gallery of Victoria. He died in Caulfield Hospital on 10 April 1978 after suffering a stroke and his remains were cremated.

== Dates of rank ==
Private	Sergeant	Company Sergeant Major	Second lieutenant	Lieutenant
20 August 1914	8 May 1915	5 July 1915	4 August 1915	13 December 1915

Captain	Major	Lieutenant-Colonel	Colonel	Brigadier
23 December 1916	1 June 1940	1 November 1940	1 May 1942	1 September 1942

== Honours and awards ==
Commander of the Order of the British Empire Military division (1947) Officer of the Order of the British Empire Military division (1941)
Military Cross (1916)
1914–15 Star (1920)
British War Medal (1920)
Victory Medal (1920) (Oakleaf for Mention in Despatches)
1939–1945 Star (1946)
Africa Star (1946)
Pacific Star (1946)
France and Germany Star (1946)
Defence Medal (1946)
War Medal 1939–45 (1946)
Australia Service Medal 1939–45 (1946)
Efficiency Decoration (1946)
Belgian Croix de Guerre (1919)
