= Hereward Kesteven =

Australian medical scientist

Hereward Leighton Kesteven (16 January 1881 – 18 May 1964) was an Australian medical scientist.

Born at Levuka, Fiji, to medical officer Leighton Kesteven and Caroline Elizabeth, née Eames, he and his family moved to Brisbane in the 1880s and to Sydney in 1891, where Hereward attended Sydney Church of England Grammar School until his father's bankruptcy forced him to leave. He became technical assistant to the Australian Museum's curator in 1903 and on 18 October 1905 married professional musician Irene "Ivy" Valentine Smith. He attended the University of Sydney and received a Bachelor of Science in 1909, a Doctorate of Science in 1911, a Bachelor of Medicine in 1914 and a Master of Surgery in 1916. He lectured at the physiology department of Sydney Technical College from 1908 to 1913 and published A Manual of Practical Bio-Chemistry in 1912.

In 1915, Kesteven entered general practice at Belmore, later practicing at Gin Gin and Gladstone in Queensland before returning to Sydney in 1919, where he received his Doctorate of Medicine. He set up practice at Maroubra but in 1920 relocated to Bulahdelah. He was appointed honorary zoologist to the Australian Museum in 1926 and wrote articles for the publications of the Museum, the Linnean Society of New South Wales and the Royal Society of New South Wales. He was integral in the building of Bulahdelah's hospital and later acquired a local farm. In 1934 he ran for the federal election, contesting Earle Page's seat of Cowper for the Douglas Credit Party. In 1936 he returned to Sydney and became medical director for Goodyear; during the war he worked in armament factories in Lithgow.

From 1942 to 1946, Kesteven was director of medical services to the Allied Works Council, publishing a series of articles that were later collected as An Industrial Medical-Efficiency Service. His work on "the evolution of the skull and the cephalic muscles" won him the Warren Burfitt prize in 1944 and the David Syme Research Prize in 1946. His first wife, who had a cerebral haemorrhage in 1936, died after a long illness in 1943 and Kesteven remarried nurse Louise Ray Smith on 24 June 1944 at Darling Point. He moved to Queensland for his health in 1948, practicing at Cooktown, Palmwoods, Maroochydore and Brighton. He died suddenly in 1964 and was cremated.
