= Edward Henry Embley =

Australian doctor and anesthesia researcher

- Born: February 28, 1861; Castlemaine, Victoria, Australia
- Died: May 9, 1924 (aged 63); Melbourne, Victoria, Australia
- Education: University of Melbourne
- Awards: David Syme Research Prize; 1906

Edward Henry Embley (28 February 1861 – 9 May 1924) was an Australian physician who studied the effects of chloroform on the human body.

Embley was born at Castlemaine, Victoria, younger son of Richard Edward Embley, a baker, and his wife Mary, née Smith, who both came from Gloucestershire, England. He was educated at Castlemaine Grammar School, the Bendigo High School and the University of Melbourne, where he graduated M.B., B.S. in 1889.

He died on 9 May 1924, leaving a widow and two daughters. In 1929 the International Anesthesia Research Society held a memorial dinner in Chicago, and presented a scroll of honour to the University of Melbourne. Embley was awarded the first David Syme Research Prize at the University of Melbourne in 1906.
