= Wai-Hong Tham =

Malaysian microbiologist

Wai-Hong Tham is a Malaysian parasitologist. She is a professor at the University of Melbourne and the Walter and Eliza Hall Institute of Medical Research (WEHI), and joint head of the division of Infectious Disease and Immune Defense. She researches the molecular biology of the malaria parasite Plasmodium vivax.

== Education ==
Tham was involved in work in 2000 with the lab of Barbara Baker on the tobacco mosaic virus resistance gene N in tobacco plants at University of California, Berkeley, using deletion studies to identify important amino acids in the structure of the protein to fight off the virus. Tham was awarded her BA at University of California, Berkeley and her PhD at Princeton University with Virginia Zakian. During her PhD Tham studied telomeres of yeast, showing that the localisation of the left telomere of chromosome IV at the periphery of the nuclear membrane was essential for, but not sufficient, to prevent gene expression.

== Career ==
Tham continued to work on yeast for her next project in the lab of Angelika Amon; using strains with individual genes deleted to identify genes involved in the separation of chromosomes during meiosis. Disruption of these genes in the deletion strains led to nondisjunction. Tham also participated in identifying the protein FPR3 as a member of the recombination checkpoint program during meiosis.

Tham first started working on malaria in the lab of Alan Cowman at WEHI. Here she identified the human red blood cell protein complement-receptor 1 (CR1) as the binding partner for the Plasmodium falciparum (the major human malaria) invasion protein Rh4. Her further work in the same lab found the binding sites on the CR1 peptide for Rh4, and proved that phosphorylation of the cytoplasmic tails of Rh4 and other invasion proteins (sections of surface membrane proteins inside the cell) were essential for the malaria parasite to be able to penetrate red blood cells.

In 2018, Tham's lab proved that the P. vivax reticulocyte-binding protein binds the human transferrin receptor 1 protein in order to invade early red blood cells (reticulocytes). The same year, following on from this work, Tham's lab published a cryo-EM structure of the two proteins complexed together. This structure showed where antibody binding sites can obstruct the interaction and prevent host cell invasion.

== Awards and accolades ==
Tham was named a Howard Hughes Medical Institute-Wellcome Trust International Research scholar in 2017. In 2018 the WEHI institute awarded Tham the Burnet Prize for work on the binding of P. vivax parasites and red blood cells, and the University of Melbourne awarded her the David Syme Research Prize. In 2019 Tham was a member of a team of P. vivax researchers from WEHI awarded the Australian Museum Eureka Prize. The 2020 International Prize from the Biochemical Society was awarded to Tham. Tham was inducted into the Victorian Honour Roll of Women in 2023.
