= Fairfield Infectious Diseases Hospital =

Coordinates: 37°47′16.85″S 145°0′40.65″E

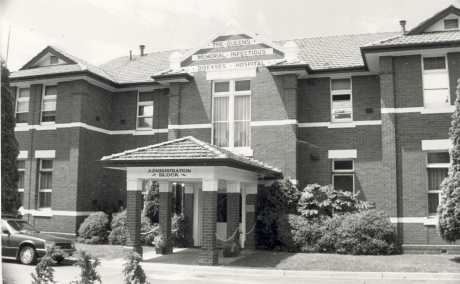

Geography
- Location: Yarra Bend Road, Fairfield, Australia

Organisation
- Type: Specialist

Services
- Beds: 720
- Speciality: Infectious Diseases

History
- Founded: October 1, 1904
- Closed: 1996

Links
- Lists: Hospitals in Australia

Fairfield Infectious Diseases Hospital, originally known as Queen's Memorial Infectious Diseases Hospital, operated from 1904 to its closure in 1996. Perched high on the banks of the Yarra River at Yarra Bend in the inner Melbourne suburb of Fairfield, it developed an international reputation for the research and treatment of infectious diseases. When it closed, it was the last specific infectious diseases hospital in Australia.

Initially the hospital was devoted to the treatment of patients with fevers. Diseases treated included typhoid, diphtheria, cholera, smallpox, poliomyelitis and scarlet fever, and in its final years, HIV/AIDS became very prominent.

== Site and planning ==
In the 1860s, the colony of Victoria was rife with diseases such as diphtheria, typhoid, smallpox and scarlet fever. At the time, Melbourne had two general hospitals, Melbourne and Alfred and three specialist hospitals, Lying-In, Children's and Eye and Ear. These five hospitals were unable to cope with the annual bouts of infectious diseases which recurred frequently. The colonial government began discussing the idea of constructing a hospital to treat patients with infectious diseases. Two sites were considered, one at Yarra Bend and another further along Heidelberg Road. Yarra Bend was the preferred location however the local residents protested and the proposal was dropped.

Plans for an infectious diseases hospital were again considered in 1874 however no significant moves were made until 1897, the year of Queen Victoria's Diamond Jubilee. Queen Victoria had made it known that any funds raised to celebrate her jubilee should be used to help the sick. By November 1897, £16 000 was raised by municipal levies. The government granted 15 acres (6.1 ha) of land at Yarra Bend, due north of the Yarra Bend Asylum. Tenders were listed in 1900 for the hospital's first buildings and construction was completed in 1901. Unfortunately all of the funds had been consumed by building the hospital and further money had to be sourced to furnish the buildings and employ staff.

== Early years ==
In 1904 the hospital opened its doors. Funds for operating the hospital were drawn from Melbourne, Fitzroy, Richmond, St. Kilda, Brunswick and Coburg councils. Each council contributed to the upkeep of the hospital and in return they had a seat on the hospital board and their ratepayers were treated free of charge. Other councils were required to pay for any of their residents who required the use of the hospital. Six patients were admitted to the hospital during its first week, one of whom died. This was a public scandal as the child who died was from Northcote and there had been a delay in admitting him whilst the Town Clerk of Northcote debated who was to pay for the boy's hospital fees.

Because of public disquiet about the running of the hospital, an inquiry was held in 1912. This led to the Infectious Diseases Hospital Act 1914 (No. 2493), which established a board of management. In 1915 the board was further expanded with Northcote and Preston joining the board. All councils now contributed to the upkeep of the hospital as well as receiving funding from the State Government.

=== Spanish Influenza ===
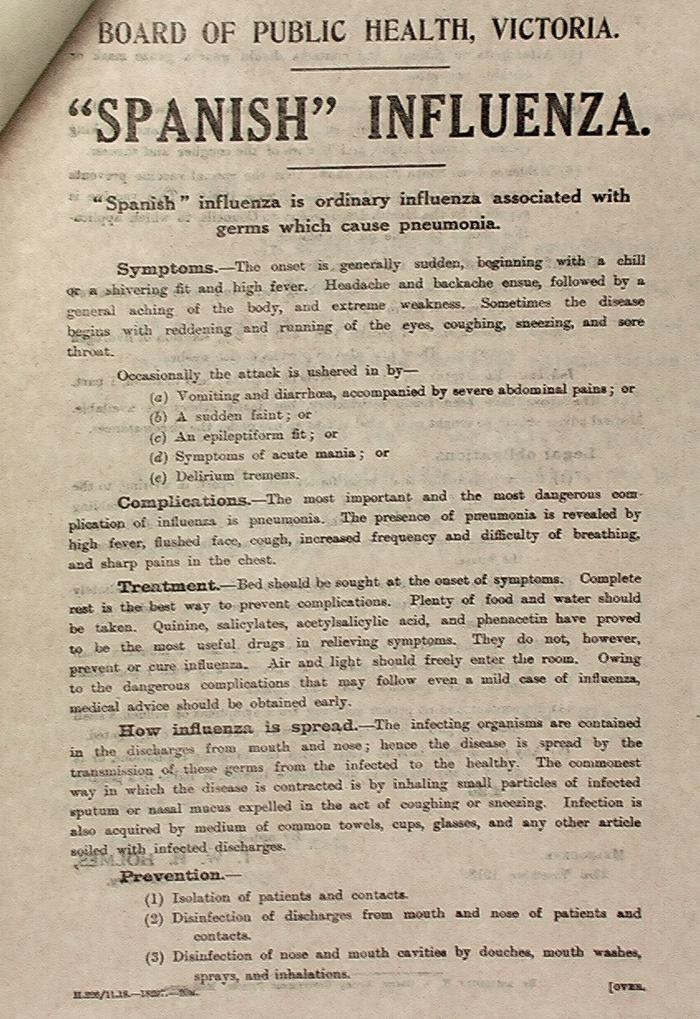
Victorian Spanish Influenza precautions leaflet

In 1918 Melbourne and Sydney's ports were placed under quarantine in an attempt to avoid the introduction into Australia of the Spanish Influenza epidemic which was claiming thousands of lives around the world. While the quarantine had some effect in limiting the introduction of the disease to Australia, the first cases were eventually diagnosed and patients were hospitalised, causing a sharp rise in intake figures. Fairfield Hospital's intake of patients had remained stable until 1918–1920; during these years the intake jumped to 6000 patients a year, which would remain the average until the late 1980s.

=== Polio epidemic ===
In the late 1930s, Australia was struck by an epidemic of poliomyelitis. All acute cases were sent to Queen's Memorial Hospital and Medical Superintendent Dr F. V. G. Scholes set aside 230 beds for polio patients. 1,275 polio patients were admitted between July 1937 and July 1938. Most were less than 14 years old, 140 had respiratory paralysis and 106 required respirator treatment in an iron lung. Seventy seven of these patients died and many were permanently disabled.

Prior to the 1937 epidemic, the hospital had only one iron lung, a 'Drinker' respirator. It had been imported from London to treat the occasional case of diphtheritic paralysis, a partial paralysis that may follow diphtheria, affecting the soft palate and throat muscles. With the onset of the 1937 epidemic, more respirators were urgently required. Six new wooden respirators were developed and installed by Aubrey Burstall, the Professor of Engineering at the University of Melbourne, with 23 more to follow shortly after. During the height of the epidemic, up to 47 patients were using the hospital's 30 respirators on a 'time share' basis.

Further polio epidemics in 1947-48 and 1951-52 saw more patients sent to Fairfield for treatment and rehabilitation. The discovery of Salk vaccine and Sabin vaccine in the 1950s saw polio virtually eradicated from Australia.

== Fairfield Hospital ==
After the Second World War, the mass production of penicillin and other antibiotics enabled a decline in several infectious diseases. As a result, in 1948 new legislation enabled the hospital to treat general medical and surgical patients, and the Queen's Memorial Hospital was renamed Fairfield Hospital.

In 1959 Vivian Bullwinkel was appointed Matron of Fairfield Infectious Diseases Hospital. After her retirement in 1977, she was honoured with The Vivian Bullwinkel School of Nursing being opened at Fairfield Hospital in September 1978.

== Burnet Institute ==
A virology laboratory was established at Fairfield Hospital in 1950 to undertake clinical, diagnostic and research services for the many patients with viral infections. Under the guidance of Dr Alan Ferris (1950–1970) and Professor Ian Gust (1970–1990), Fairfield gained a worldwide reputation for education, research and treatment. The laboratory was the first to isolate hepatitis A virus and one of the first strains of respiratory syncytial virus (the A2 strain, now a reference A group virus).

With the emergence of the HIV virus in Australia in the early 1980s, Fairfield Hospital and its virology laboratory became one of the primary centres for patient care, diagnostic services, public health reference and research into AIDS in Australia. During this period it was suggested that the virology research functions should be transferred to a more independently managed research centre within Fairfield Hospital.

In 1983, Sir Frank Macfarlane Burnet became the founding patron of the new research centre. Macfarlane Burnet, a Nobel Laureate had been appointed Honorary Consultant Epidemiologist at Fairfield Hospital in 1946, a position he held until his death in 1985. Following his death, Professor Gust and the Burnet family agreed that the virology research centre should be named the Macfarlane Burnet Centre for Medical Research (later changed to the Macfarlane Burnet Institute for Medical Research and Public Health), in honour of Sir Frank.

The Burnet Institute continued to operate on the grounds of Fairfield Hospital up until the hospital's closure.

== HIV/AIDS ==
In November 1982, the first case of AIDS was diagnosed at St Vincent's Hospital, Sydney. By mid 1983 AIDS was declared a notifiable disease in Victoria and Dr Ron Lucas, seconded to the CDC from Fairfield Hospital recommended that Fairfield staff warn the homosexual community of the impending illness. In November 1983, Fairfield's Professor Ian Gust began a collaboration with Dr Luc Montagnier of the Pasteur Institute in Paris to develop tests to detect HIV infection. As a result of their success, the Fairfield Hospital Laboratory began regular testing of Australian blood products in 1984, several months before the rest of the world.

The first patient with AIDS was admitted to Fairfield Hospital in April 1984. In October 1984 the first AIDS outpatients clinic at Fairfield Hospital opened on Friday afternoons. Twenty five percent of initial patients were found to be HIV+. During the late 1980s, admission rates to soared to 10,000 a year, as HIV infection rates continue to increase. In 1990 researchers from Fairfield Hospital published findings from two of their studies about HIV resistance to the drug AZT during treatment. Their studies showed that some people with HIV who took AZT developed resistance to the drug and then lost that resistance when treatment was stopped. They suggested that three or more drugs are needed to be used together to treat HIV effectively (also known as combination therapy).

Fairfield Hospital continued to offer care and treatment for patients with HIV and AIDS into the 1990s. In 1991, large public protests were organised against the possible closure of the hospital. However, by 1996 the majority of the hospital's HIV services had been relocated to The Alfred and Royal Melbourne Hospitals and Fairfield Hospital ceased operations.

=== AIDS Memorial Garden ===
In the mid 1980s, the Victorian AIDS Council and the management of Fairfield Hospital proposed the establishment of a garden and walk for the use of Fairfield Hospital patients and their families, particularly those with HIV. An area of river frontage owned by Collingwood Council was initially proposed, however it was eventually decided that a site on hospital grounds was more appropriate. Construction began 1987 with materials and professional services provided by volunteers, donators, the Victorian AIDS Council, Northcote City Council and Fairfield Hospital. The garden featured several Victorian style garden seats which were donated by families who had lost members through AIDS, a gazebo, rockeries and plantings of local indigenous plants and was opened on April 9, 1988.

The garden fell into disrepair following the closure of Fairfield Hospital. As part of the agreement to purchase the bulk of the former hospital's site, NMIT accepted responsibility for the care and maintenance of the garden. However, when construction workers found vials of infectious diseases such as E. coli in the adjacent Yarra House, a strike was called and work on Yarra House (and the memorial garden) ceased.

Initial intentions were that the garden not be a memorial but instead an area of respite and reflection.

== Closure and redevelopment ==
In September 1991 the Report of the Reviews of Infectious Diseases in Victoria authored by the Victorian Health Department under Premier Joan Kirner recommended the relocation of HIV/AIDS services to The Alfred Hospital. Other infectious disease patients were to be cared for by the Royal Melbourne Hospital. In the 1990s, the Victorian Liberal Government of Jeff Kennett pursued the rationalisation of hospital services. Despite strong protests, the specialised functions of the hospital were transferred to other hospitals and on 30 June 1996 Fairfield Infectious Diseases Hospital closed.

Since closure in 1996 most of the hospital site has been redeveloped. The northern portion of the site including the majority of the hospital buildings were sold to NMIT. Redevelopment of the site was halted in September 2001 when workers found vials of E. coli and other bacteria in the ceiling of one of the buildings. This resulted in industrial action, which was later addressed. Many of the remaining buildings have been adapted for use by Melbourne Polytechnic, then known as NMIT. Also using part of the site is the Disability Forensic Assessment and Treatment Service, operated by the Department of Human Services. The Victorian Institute of Forensic Mental Health, Thomas Embling Hospital occupies the southern portion of the site, adjacent to the area formerly occupied by Fairlea Women's Prison.

== See also ==
- Yarra Bend Asylum
- Burnet Institute
- Melbourne Polytechnic
- HM Prison Fairlea
