= Ian Gust =

Australian virologist

Ian Gust AO
- Born: 15 January 1941 (age 85)
- Education: University of Melbourne; University of London
- Known for: The development of vaccines against Hepatitis A
- Awards: Fellow of the Australian Academy of Technological Sciences and Engineering (1986)
- Scientific career
- Fields: Virology, pathology
- Workplaces: Fairfield Infectious Diseases Hospital (1970–1991); Burnet Institute (1970–1990); CSL Limited (1990–2008)

Ian David Gust (born 15 January 1941) is an Australian medical researcher, virologist, and former science administrator. Gust's area of work is in the development of drugs and vaccines against viral diseases and he is best known for the development of vaccines against the Hepatitis A virus. He currently serves as a non–executive company director and consultant.

Gust is the son of Itzhak Gust, a prominent Jewish socialist who migrated to Australia from Poland, via Palestine, in the 1930s. His sister is the writer Amirah Inglis.

== Career ==
After an initial residency at The Alfred Hospital, Gust was appointed as a pathology registrar at the Fairfield Infectious Diseases Hospital, Melbourne, Australia; then spending two years in the United Kingdom at the London School of Hygiene and Tropical Medicine and the WHO Regional Virus Laboratory in Glasgow. Gust returned to Fairfield in 1970 and was appointed a medical virologist at the Infectious Diseases Hospital, a position he held for over twenty years. During this period, Fairfield gained a worldwide reputation for virology education, research and treatment. In collaboration with Allan Ferris and Stephen Locarnini at Monash University these laboratories were the first to isolate hepatitis A virus in patients. The virus laboratory was one of the first to isolate strains of the respiratory syncytial virus (the A2 strain, now a reference A group virus).

In 1985, Gust was appointed as the inaugural director of the Macfarlane Burnet Centre for Medical Research, Fairfield Hospital, now commonly known as the Burnet Institute, holding this position until 1991. Between 1991 and 2008, Gust served as director of research and development for the Commonwealth Serum Laboratories, now listed as CSL Limited, where he was closely involved in the company's successful expansion in Australia and internationally.

Since his retirement, he has been a Professorial Fellow in the Department of Microbiology and Immunology in the University of Melbourne, and as a consultant to the Bill and Melinda Gates Foundation; to UNICEF, the World Bank and the World Health Organization. A non–executive director of biotechnology company, Biota Holdings Limited, since 2001, Gust is also a director of Promics Pty Ltd.

Gust served variously as a member of WHO expert committees on viral hepatitis (1974, 1979, 1982), biological standardisation (1992), and virus diseases (1975, 1985–1991). He has been a Director of the National Hepatitis Reference Centre (1979-1990) and between 1989 and 1992 served as the Commonwealth Chief Medical and Scientific Adviser on AIDS.

== Achievements ==
Gust's public health work at the Burnet Institute is known for "...the development of vaccines against Hepatitis A and membership of the International Task Force for Hepatitis B Immunization. He established the National HIV reference laboratory and directed the National Health and Medical Research Council's special unit for AIDS virology. Since he retired in 2000, he has been director of the World Health Organization Collaborating Centre for Influenza and a member of the National Influenza Pandemic Planning Committee."

== Honours and awards ==
In 1992, Gust was appointed an Officer of the Order of Australia for service to public health, particularly in the prevention of hepatitis and AIDS.

== Publications ==
=== Books ===
- Gust, Ian D.; Kahn, Patricia; Koff, Wayne C. (2007). AIDS Vaccine Development: Challenges and Opportunities. Wymondham: Caister Academic Press.

=== Journal articles ===
Gust has published 205 peer-reviewed articles listed in Scopus. The most cited are:

- Gust, I.D. "Epidemiological patterns of hepatitis A in different parts of the world" (1992) Vaccine, 10 (SUPPL. 1), pp. S56-S58. Cited 119 times.
- Gust, I.D."Epidemiology of hepatitis B infection in the Western Pacific and South East Asia" (1996) Gut, 38 (SUPPL. 2), pp. S18-S23. Cited 85 times.
- Doidge, C., Gust, I., Lee, A., Buck, F., Hazell, S., Manne, U. "Therapeutic immunisation against helicobacter infection [4]" (1994) Lancet, 343 (8902), pp. 914–915. Cited 80 times.
- Russell, C.A., Jones, T.C., Barr, I.G., Cox, N.J., Garten, R.J., Gregory, V., Gust, I.D., Hampson, A.W., Hay, A.J., Hurt, A.C., De Jong, J.C., Kelso, A., Klimov, A.I., Kageyama, T., Komadina, N., Lapedes, A.S., Lin, Y.P., Mosterin, A., Obuchi, M., Odagiri, T., Osterhaus, A.D.M.E., Rimmelzwaan, G.F., Shaw, M.W., Skepner, E., Stohr, K., Tashiro, M., Fouchier, R.A.M., Smith, D.J. "The global circulation of seasonal influenza A (H3N2) viruses" (2008) Science, 320 (5874), pp. 340–346. Cited 78 times.
- Fairley, C.K., Mijch, A., Gust, I.D., Nichilson, S., Dimitrakakis, M., Lucas, C.R. "The increased risk of fatal liver disease in renal transplant patients who are hepatitis Be antigen and/or HBV DNA positive" (1991) Transplantation, 52 (3), pp. 497–500. Cited 46 times.

== See also ==
- Burnet Institute
- CSL Limited
