= Ronald Drayton Brown =

Australian chemist and academic

Ronald Drayton Brown AM FAA (14 October 1927 – 2 November 2008) was an Australian chemist and academic.

In 1959, he was appointed to the Foundation Chair of Chemistry at Monash University, where he remained head of the department until 1992.

He was then elected a Fellow of the Australian Academy of Science in 1965 and appointed as a Member of the Order of Australia in 2002.
