= Alfred Newman (architect) =

Australian architect

Alfred G Newman – Architect
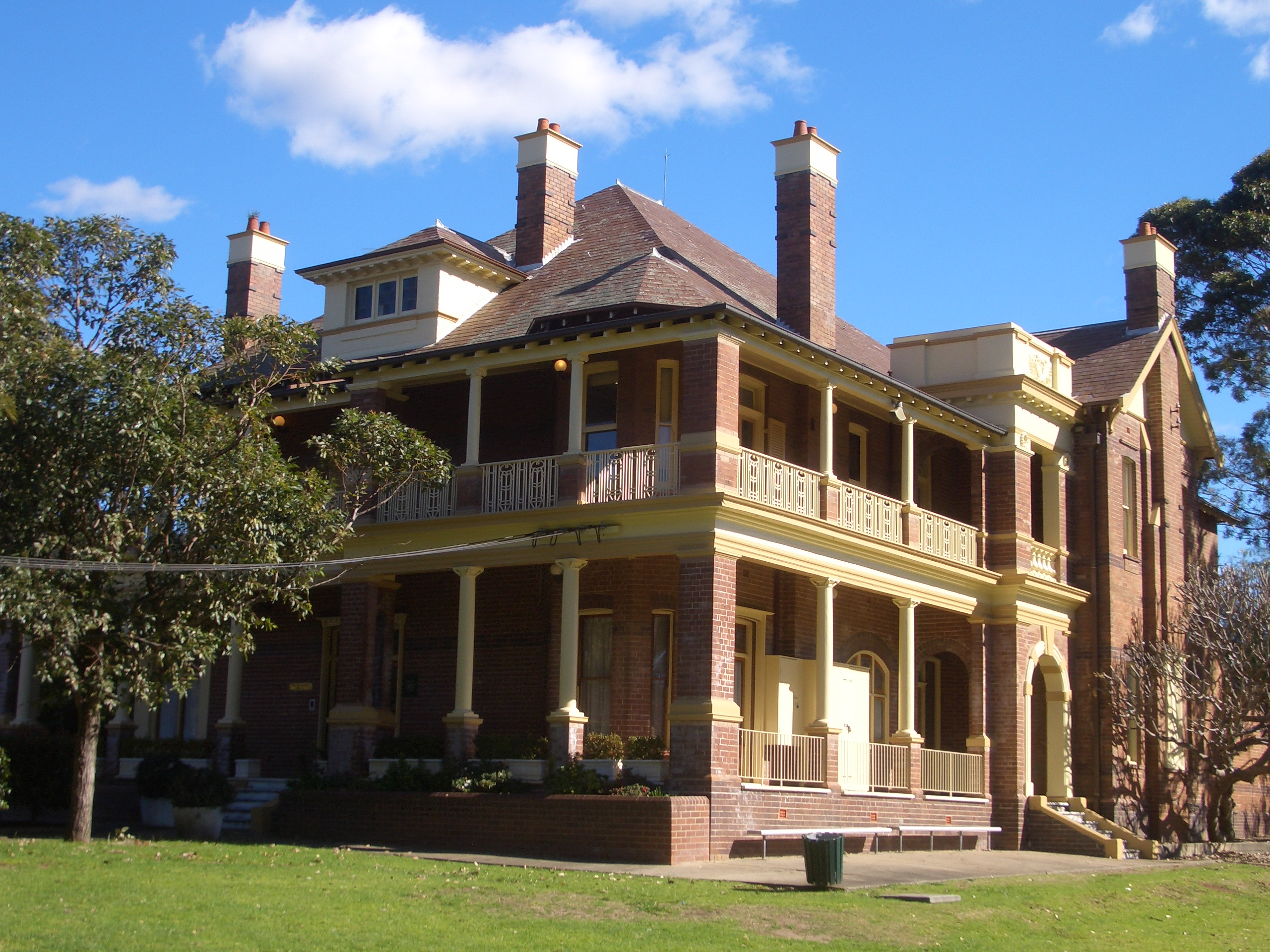
- Lauriston, Strathfield
- Born: 18 January 1875; South Australia
- Died: 18 January 1921 (aged 46); New South Wales
- Occupation: Architect
- Projects: 15 Methodist Churches throughout NSW
- Design: The Tower Wing MLC School

Alfred Gambier Newman (18 January 1875 – 18 January 1921) was an Australian architect active in the first 20 years of the 20th century. He designed significant work for both the Methodist Church and the Newman and Vickery families.

== Early life ==
Newman was born in Mount Gambier, South Australia, one of eight children of Emma Ann (née Fisher) and the Rev. Charles Thomas Newman. He was educated at Prince Alfred College (PAC), Adelaide (1887–1890) where his art master was James Ashton. After leaving PAC, Newman studied art and design at the South Australian School of Art. In 1896 his mother died in Kapunda. In 1900 his father married Elizabeth Vickery, the daughter of Ebenezer Vickery, merging two prominent Methodist families.

== Architect ==
Newman was articled to architect Frederick William Dancker. He then worked as an architect in Adelaide and became an Associate of the South Australian Institute of Architects in 1898. He advertised in The Advertiser as "Alfred G Newman A.S.A.I.A. Architect" of Augusta Street Glenelg, South Australia and later in King William Street, Adelaide before moving to Sydney in 1906. He resigned from the South Australian Roll of Architects in 1909.

== Marriage and family ==
Newman and his wife lived at Ingleburn, Kingsland Road, Strathfield, and had three daughters, one stillborn. He died at home in Strathfield in 1921.

== Architectural commissions ==
From the time Newman moved to Sydney he was a superintendent of the Sunday school at the Strathfield Methodist Church and over a period of 15 years did a substantial amount of design work for the church. His buildings include:

=== Churches ===
- Auburn Methodist Church (now Uniting Church) corner of Helena and Harrow Streets, Auburn, New South Wales;
- Barraba Methodist Church, Barraba, New South Wales;
- Beecroft Methodist Church (now Uniting Church), Beecroft Road Beecroft, New South Wales;
- Blackheath Methodist Church (now Uniting Church) 43-45 Govetts Leap Road, Blackheath, New South Wales;
- Dee Why Methodist Church (now Cecil Gribble Uniting Church) 60 Howard Avenue Dee Why, New South Wales;
- Epping Methodist Church (demolished 2022) Epping, New South Wales;
- Hurlstone Park Methodist (now Uniting Church) 8 Melford Street Hurlstone Park, New South Wales;
- Kempsey Methodist Church, Kempsey, New South Wales;
- Lakemba Methodist Church (now Uniting Church) The Boulevarde, Lakemba, New South Wales;
- Manilla Methodist Church (now Uniting Church) Strafford Street, Manilla, New South Wales;
- North Ryde Methodist Church, North Ryde, New South Wales;
- Rhodes Methodist Church, Rhodes, New South Wales;
- Strathfield Methodist Church (now Carrington Avenue Uniting Church) 13 Carrington Avenue, Strathfield, New South Wales;
- Tighes Hill Methodist Church, Tighes Hill, New South Wales;
- Young Methodist Church, Young, New South Wales;
- The Warren Methodist Church, Illawarra Road, Marrickville, New South Wales;
- Wentworthville Methodist Church, Wentworthville, New South Wales;
- Woodford Methodist Church (now abandoned) 68 Great Western Highway, Woodford, New South Wales;
- Wyalong Methodist Church, Wyalong, New South Wales.

For the Church of Christ he designed:

- Marrickville Church of Christ (demolished 2022) 389 Illawarra Road Marrickville, New South Wales.
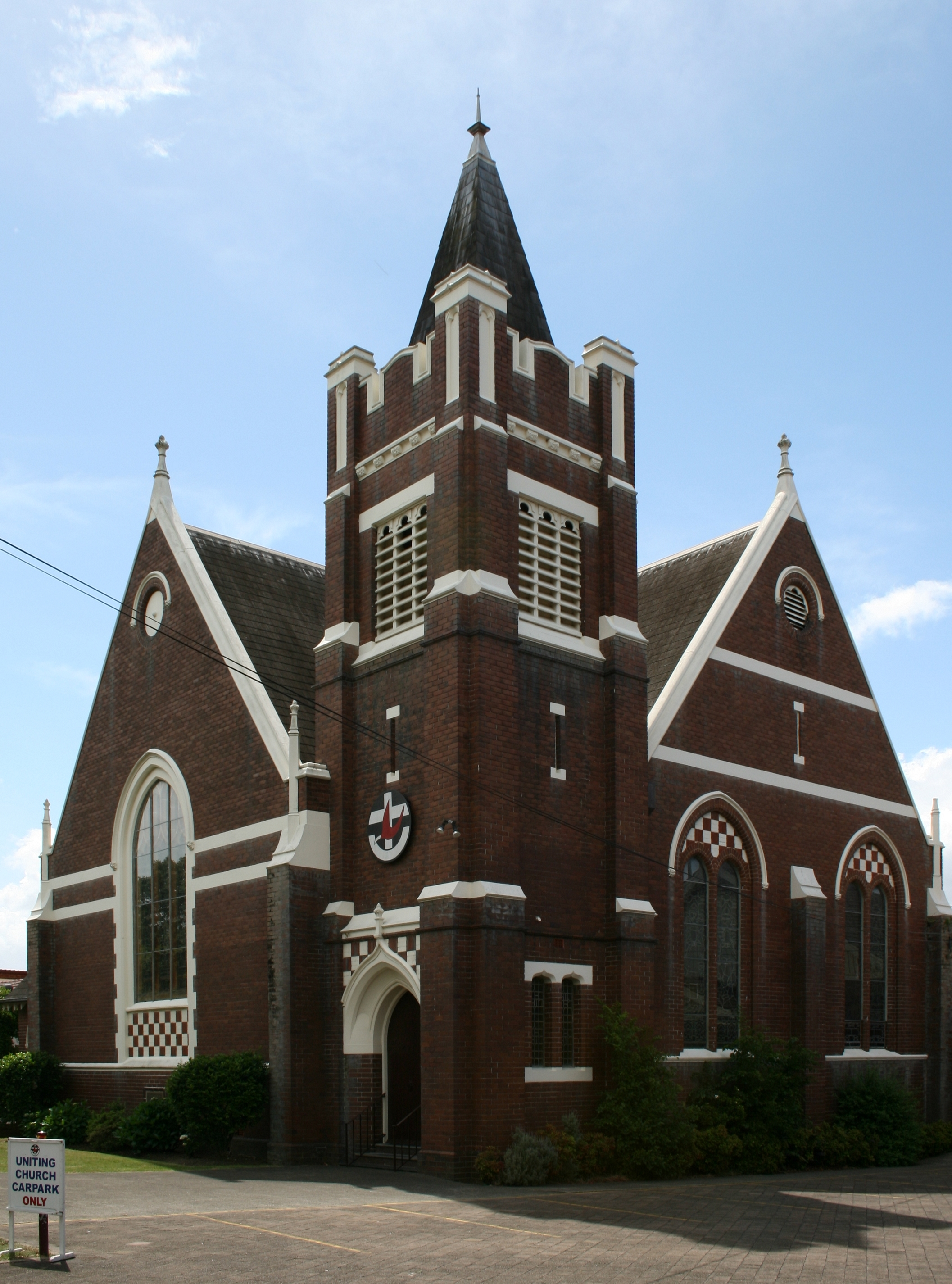
Strathfield

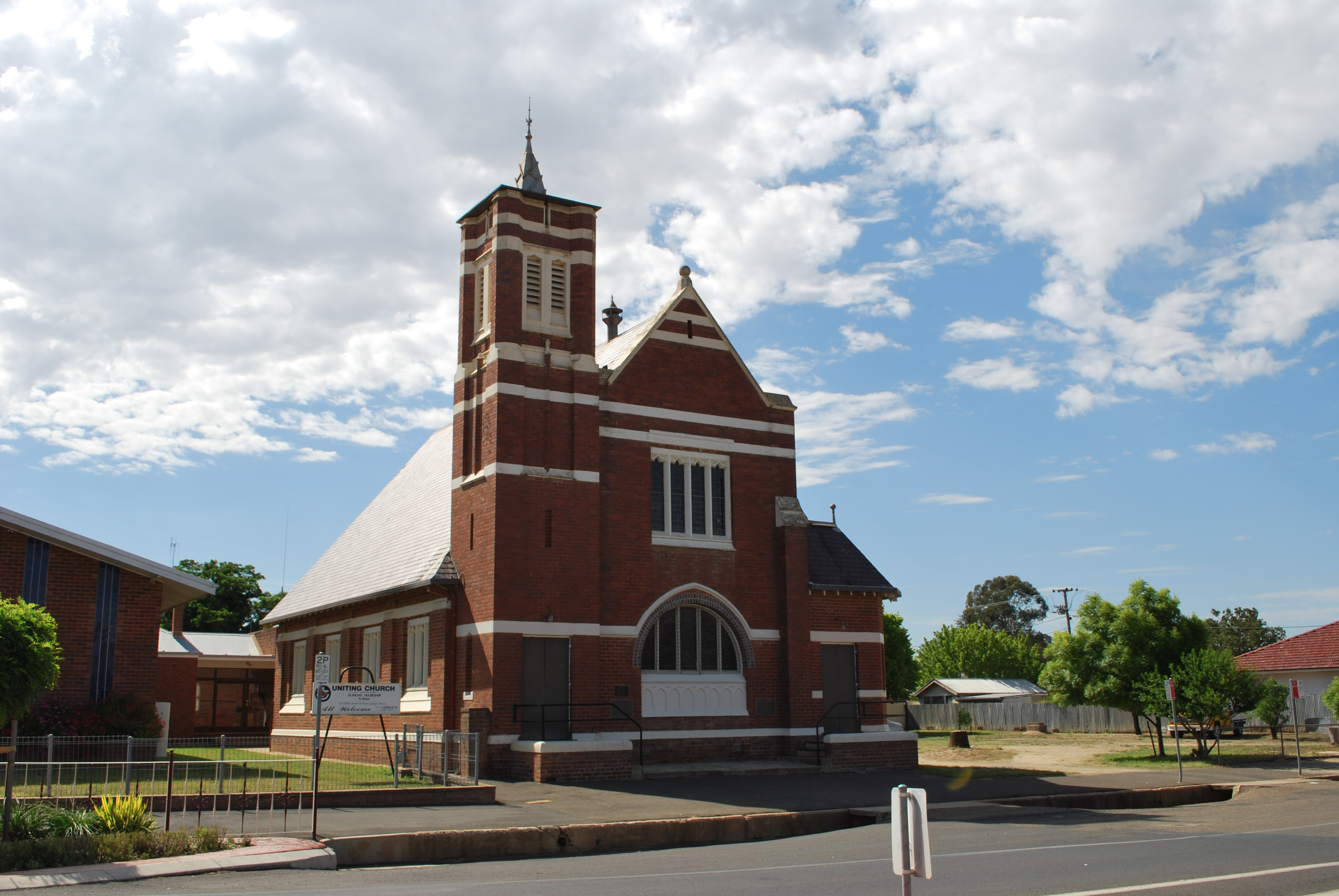
Young

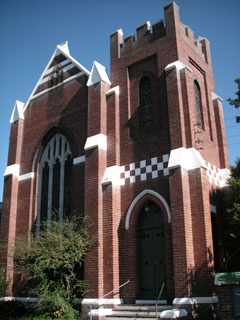
Croydon

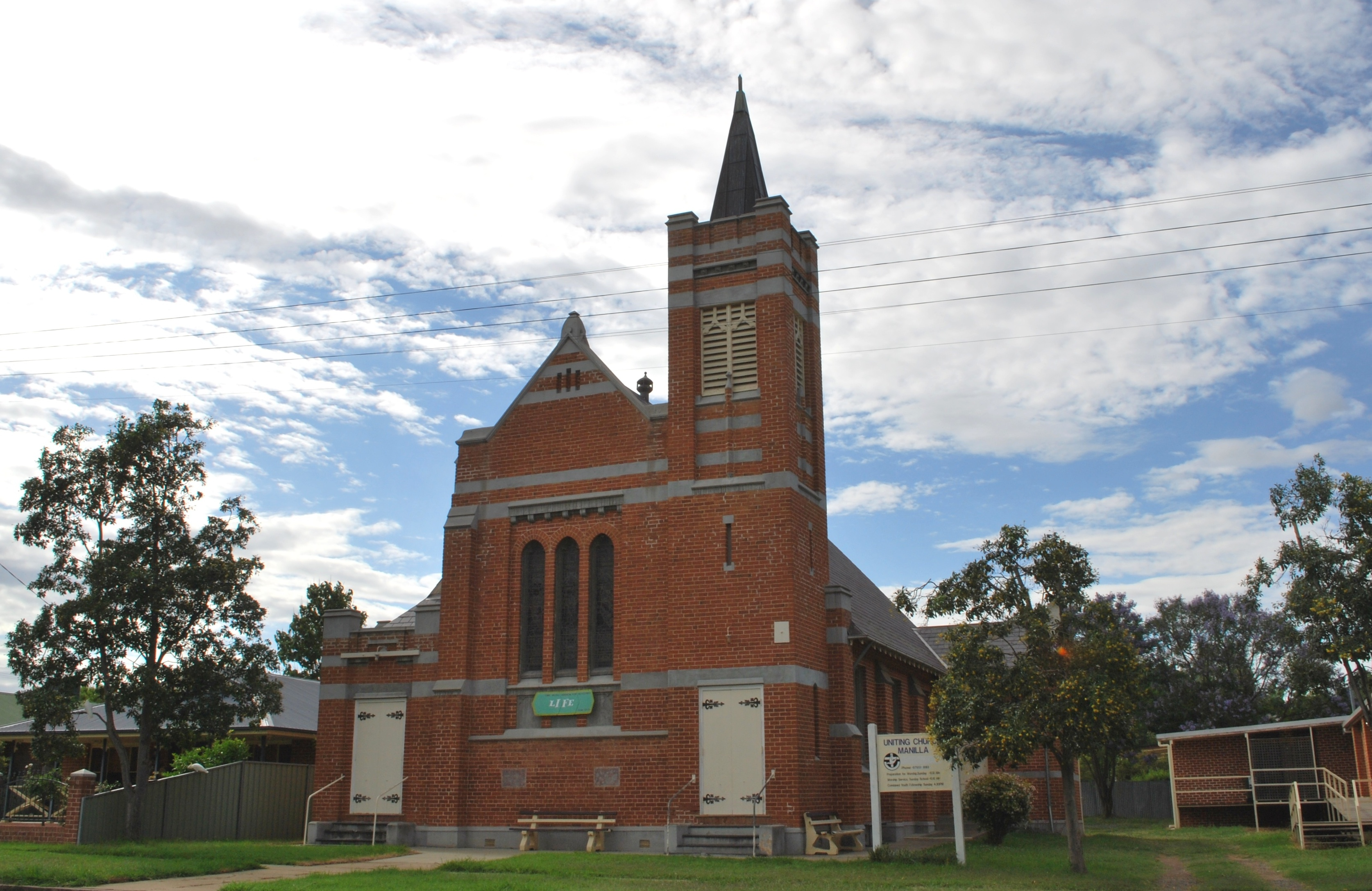
Manilla

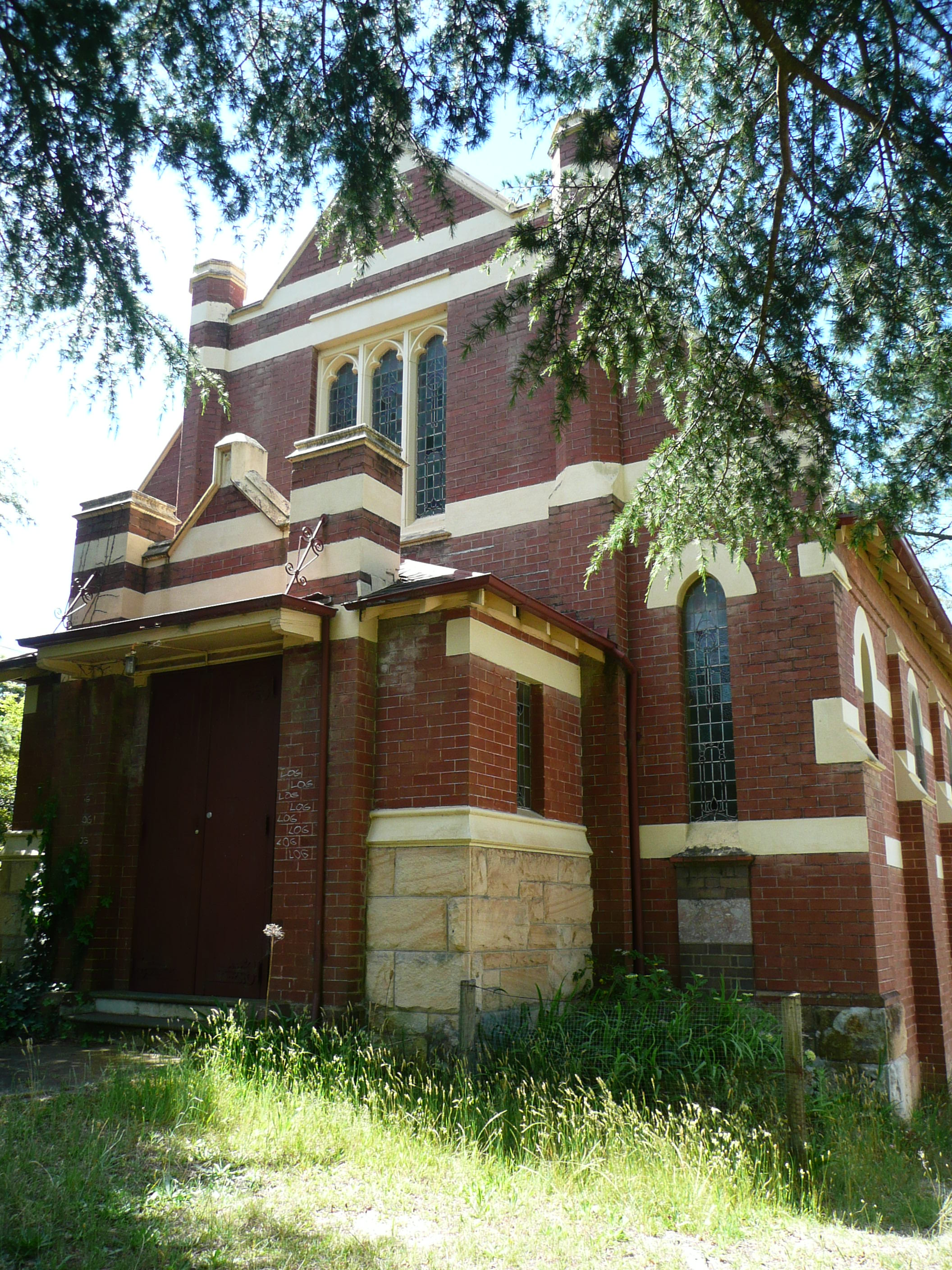
Woodford

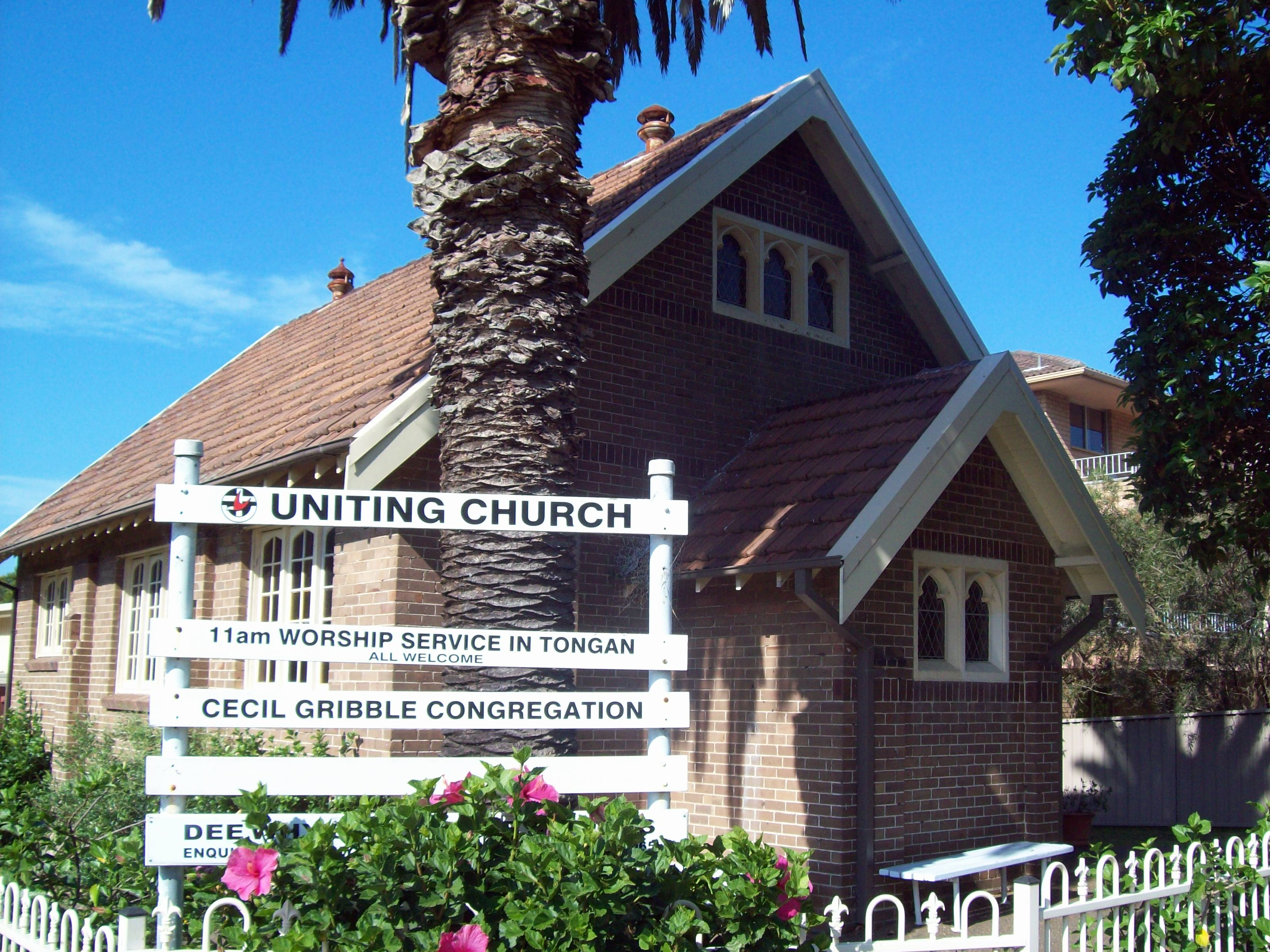
Dee Why

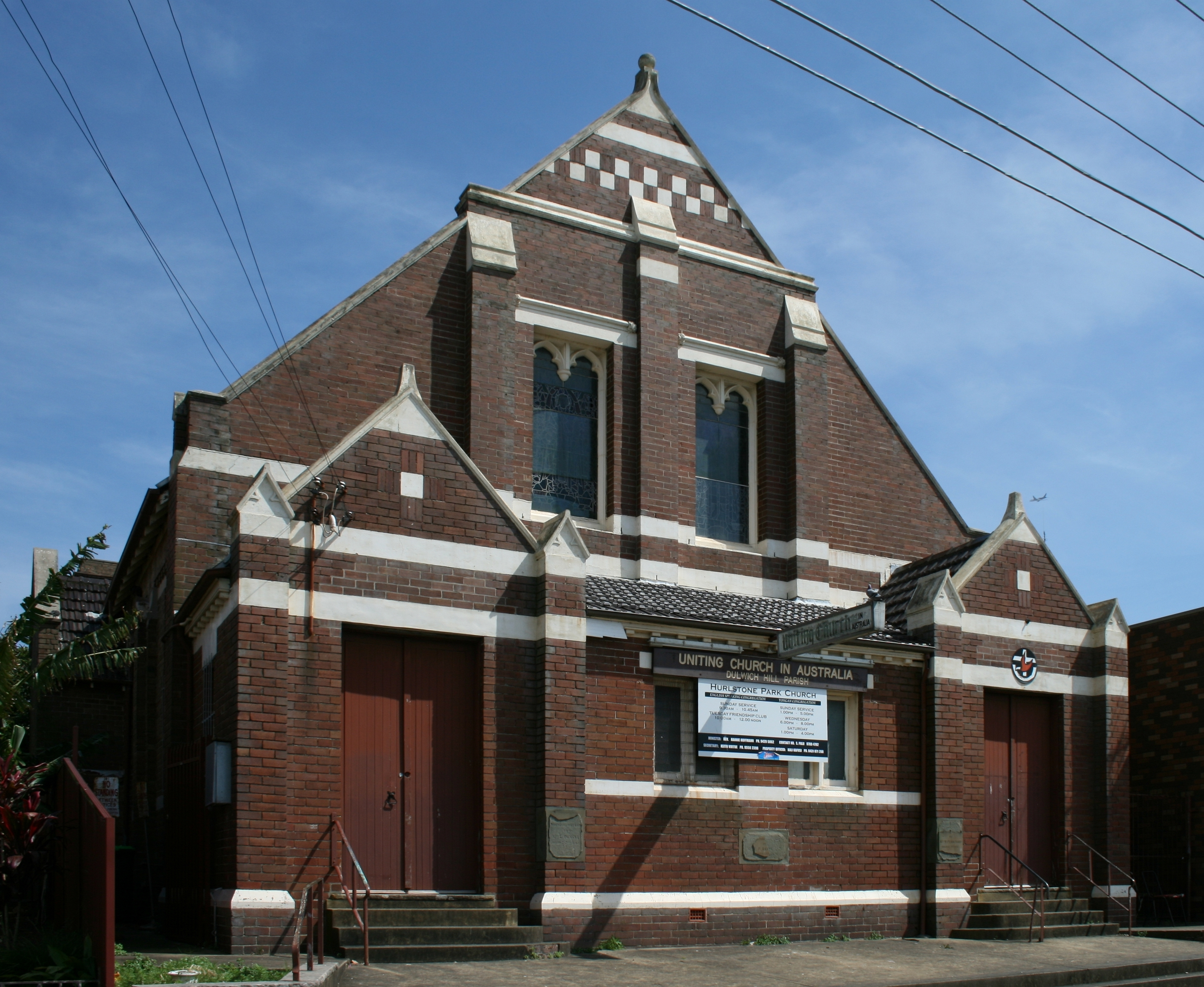
Hurlstone Park

=== Church school halls ===
- Campsie Methodist Church School Hall, Campsie, New South Wales;
- Epping Methodist Church School Hall, Epping, New South Wales.

=== Parsonages ===
- Croydon Park Methodist Parsonage, Croydon Park, New South Wales;
- Granville Methodist Parsonage, Granville, New South Wales;
- Woodford Methodist Parsonage (now a private house) 69 Great Western Highway, Woodford, New South Wales.

=== Commercial ===
- Shop and Residence (in front of Uniting Church Hall) 282-284 King Street, Newtown, New South Wales.
- Former Joseph Vickery & Co Building 1908 (now Scientology House) 201 Castlereagh Street, Sydney

=== Schools ===
- The Tower Wing at MLC School (previously Methodist Ladies' College, Burwood,) was commenced in 1918 in a Tudor Gothic style to harmonise with the existing architecture of the school.

=== Houses ===
The following house designs are attributed to Newman:

- Tiptree 1906 (later Eva Horden Red Cross Home, demolished 1954) Cnr Llandilo Avenue and Kingsland Road Strathfield, New South Wales, built for Newman's father, Rev. C T Newman, and his wife Elizabeth, a daughter of Ebenezer Vickery
- Lauriston 1907 (now Santa Maria Del Monte School) Cnr The Boulevarde and Margaret Street Strathfield, New South Wales, built for Amy Alfreda Vickery, a daughter of Ebenezer Vickery
- Ingleburn 1908 13–15 Kingsland Road Strathfield, built by Newman as his own home
- Wych Hazel 1911 (demolished 2014) 30 Livingstone Street Burwood, New South Wales, built for Oswald Aubrey Parker and his wife Sylvia Jane, a granddaughter of Ebenezer Vickery
- Camden Lodge 1917 (burnt out 2012) 98–102 Burlington Road Homebush, New South Wales, built as Canlidgy for Robert Trevethan In 2023 the front of the house is being restored with James Phillips of Weir and Philips doing the heritage work and Litera Trotta architects designing the new two level rear wing with underground parking.

=== Apartments ===
- Chelmsford Hall 1912 (redeveloped 2019) 6 Montague Street, Balmain, New South Wales, built as a Temperance Hall.

== Architectural legacy ==
Dying at 46 years of age, Newman is not well known in historical or architectural circles in Sydney in the 2020s. His residential tour de force was Tiptree. It was an enormous mansion built for his stepmother and father in 1906 and demolished less than fifty years later for suburban subdivision. Tiptree is now the name of a cul de sac that was built on its substantial grounds. The house Wych Hazel was demolished in 2014 and the house Camden Lodge was burnt down in 2012. Camden Lodge is being rebuilt as the local council refused to let the owner demolish its burnt out shell. Only a portion of The Tower Wing at MLC School remains and was restored in 2024. Most of his Methodist churches remain as Uniting churches after church Union in 1977 but the Woodford Methodist Church is now abandoned. The Epping Methodist Church was demolished for high rise development. Thirty timber pews from the church found a new home in a Wesleyan Church in Tonga. Several windows were used in Uniting Church aged-care facilities in Leichhardt and Narellan. A panelled stained-glass window depicting the Last Supper is still yet to find a new home sensitive to its Christian imagery. The developer of the new residential tower recycled church materials including the foundation stone from 1905. Bricks and stones have been used in the two-storey podium balconies at the front of the new building. A heritage area dedicated to the church features in the development’s piazza but doesn’t mention Newman who designed it. His Church of Christ in Marrickville has been demolished after being empty for many years and a million dollars spent in an effort to have it removed for low cost inner city housing. The former Joseph Vickery & Co Building in Sydney is now a well restored office building housing the Church of Scientology rather than a mainstream Christian denomination. Newman’s design for a Temperance Hall has been redeveloped as a luxury apartment block and is named in honour of Frederic Chelmsford, a former Governor of NSW.
