= Alice Whitley =

Australian chemist, educator (1913–1990)

Dr Alice Whitley MBE
- Born: 6 February 1913; Stanmore, New South Wales, Australia
- Died: 15 August 1990 (aged 77); Sydney
- Education: MLC School: University of Sydney (Bachelor of Science); University of London (Doctor of Philosophy)
- Occupations: Chemist; Teacher

Dr Alice Whitley MBE (6 February 1913 – 15 August 1990) was an Australian chemist and educator. Whitley focused on the science education of women and was for 50 years a faculty member at her alma mater Methodist Ladies' College (now known as the MLC School). She worked as a science teacher and headmistress. Whitley served as president of the Australian Science Teachers Association and the Association of Heads of Independent Girls' Schools.

== Early life and education ==
Alice Whitley was born on 6 February 1913 to Alfred and May Whitley in Stanmore, New South Wales. She attended Methodist Ladies' College, Burwwod, commencing in 1921 and was Dux of College in 1930. She earned a degree in Science from the University of Sydney.

== Teaching career ==
Whitley then taught mathematics at Brighton College, Manly and at SCEGGS Moss Vale, and was a science and mathematics teacher at MLC from 1941 to 1952. From 1952 to 1954, Whitley attended the University of London where she earned a PhD for her thesis in chemistry before returning to MLC as Head of Science and Deputy Headmistress from 1955 to 1959. She was Headmistress of MLC from 1960 until 1972. She was the last Headmistress before 1972, when the positions of principal and headmistress were amalgamated. Whitley actively promoted the importance of science education through her involvement with the Australian Science Teachers Association (ASTA), where she was president from 1956 to 1957, and vice president from 1958 to 1959. She was a member of the Commonwealth Science Advisory Committee for State Secondary Schools and helped formulate the science syllabus for the new NSW Higher School Certificate. As an academic and professional in her own right, she contributed to scientific journals and co-authored two books. Whitley also advocated for a balanced education in particular with regards to art education, sport (by establishing a sport and physical education program in 1963) and the Girl Guides movement. At Speech Night in 1969 was quoted as lamenting the "lackadaisical attitude of a permissive society which places too much importance on examination results and not enough on the continuing process of learning" and stressed her commitment to the sports program.

Whitley was president of the Association of Heads of Independent Girls Schools (AHIGS) in 1963.

== Death ==
Whitley died aged 77 years old. A memorial service was held in her honour in Potts Hall at MLC on 25 August 1990. The plant molecular biologist Liz Dennis, an MLC Old Girl, said at the time of her death that Whitley had been an inspiring high school chemistry teacher.

== Honours and legacy ==
- Named a Member of the Most Excellent Order of the British Empire 11 June 1966.
- The library at MLC is named after Whitley.
- After her death the NSW Chapter of the Australian College of Educators presented the Dr Alice Whitley Award for Science Education.

== Selected works ==
=== Journal articles ===
- Anderson, JRA; Whitley, Alice (1952). "The determination of rf values of metallic ions using diethyl ether as solvent". Analytica Chimica Acta. 6: 517–520. doi:10.1016/S0003-2670(00)86984-6.
- Bradley, DC; Wardlaw, W; Whitley, Alice (1955). "Normal alkoxides of quinquevalent tantalum". Journal of the Chemical Society: 726–728. doi:10.1039/JR9550000726.
- Bradley, DC; Wardlaw, W; Whitley, Alice (1956). "The effect of solvents on the molecular complexities of tantalum n-alkoxides". Journal of the Chemical Society: 5–7. doi:10.1039/JR9560000005.
- Martin, RL; Whitley, Alice (1958). "Magnetic studies with copper(II) salts. Part III. The constitution of copper(II)n-alkanoates in solution". Journal of the Chemical Society: 1394–1402. doi:10.1039/JR9580001394.
- Livingstone, SE; Whitley, A (1962). "The Interaction of Various Ligands with Halogen-Bridged Anionic Complexes of Bivalent Platinum and Palladium". Australian Journal of Chemistry. 15 (2): 175–180. doi:10.1071/CH9620175.

=== Textbooks ===
- Simmons, LM; Whitley, Alice (1958). A new approach to chemistry for the first three secondary years. Sydney: Brooks.
