= C. T. Newman =

Minister in South Australia and New South Wales

Charles Thomas Newman (15 October 1841 – 20 August 1911), generally known as Rev. C. T. Newman, was a Methodist minister in South Australia and New South Wales.

He was the eldest son of Thomas Newman (c. 1813 – 15 September 1881) and his wife Elizabeth, née Pomeroy (c. 1813 – 18 May 1888), who emigrated to South Australia on the barque Baboo, arriving in March 1840, and was at first engaged in farming, then opened a grocery store in Thebarton.

Also on the Baboo were George Dew (c. 1817–1877) and his wife Dinah née Pomeroy (c 1816–1866), who may have been a sister of Elizabeth Newman; they also settled in Thebarton and opened a bakery. George was a longtime member of the District Council of West Torrens from its inception; his name is commemorated in Dew Street, Thebarton.

Charles was born at Alberton and as a young man was converted to Wesleyan Methodism, and was associated with the Thebarton Methodist church. At age 16 he was Sunday School secretary, at 18 class leader and at age 20 he was a local preacher. In 1863 he joined the ministry and was ordained in 1865. His first year he served in Wallaroo, followed by Port Adelaide (1866–1867), when he initiated work on a new church at Lefevre Peninsula. He was next in Goolwa, then Angaston, Yankalilla (1870–1871), Mount Gambier (1872–1875), Kent Town, Clare (–1881), Kadina (1881–), Brompton, Norwood, and Glenelg.

He was elected president of the SA Methodist Conference in 1888, and served concurrently as president of Prince Alfred College. He also at various times served as Connexional Editor, Book Steward, and Home Mission Secretary. In 1902, at his request, he was transferred to New South Wales and was put in charge of the Darling Street, Balmain, church, followed by the Parramatta (1903–1905) then Burwood circuits. In 1909 he was put on the supernumerary list, and settled at Strathfield. During his superintendence of the Parramatta Methodist circuit he was involved with Joseph Vickery (son of Ebenezer Vickery) in the purchase of site and erection of Strathfield Methodist Church. He was also involved in the foundation of the new church at Concord.

== Family ==
Thomas had sons Charles Thomas Newman (1841–1911); George Herbert Newman (1843 – 2 November 1893), Thomas Newman (born 1845) married Alice Bennett on 20 October 1867; fourth son William Pomeroy Newman (1849 – 12 February 1885) married Catherine Jane Lean on 28 December 1871; fifth son Edward Newman (1851–1930) married Jessie J. Stewart on 19 May 1875; and sister Sarah Elizabeth Newman (born 1847) married David Norman on 27 October 1868.

Charles married Emma Ann Rose Fisher (died 1896), daughter of M. M. Fisher, in 1869. He married again, to Elizabeth "Bessie" Vickery on 13 November 1900. Bessie was the second daughter of Eben Vickery MLC. Their children included:

- Ethel Annie Newman (18 March 1870 – 6 May 1909) married Alfred Calbert Dunn on 25 April 1894. Alfred was a grandson of John Dunn of Mount Barker, South Australia
- E(dward) Percival "Percy" Newman (11 September 1871 – 4 September 1951) married Laura Mary Goode on 9 May1906, was with Crooks and Brooker in Western Australia.
- Edgar Harrold Newman LLB (1873–1932), was a solicitor, lived in Parramatta
- Alfred Gambier Newman (1875 – 18 January 1921) married Elsie Marion Murphy ( – ) on 26 November 1913, architect of Methodist churches in Strathfield, Young and elsewhere.
- Lilian Emma Newman (1878 – 21 July 1937) lived at "Kumalla", 126 Beecroft Road, Beecroft
- C(harles) Stanley Newman (born 1880) married Isabella Helen Mary McNab on 25 January 1912. He sang bass with Ada Crossley's company, lived in England. His son John Newman was killed by rebels in Iraq in 1935.
- Florence May Newman (1882 – 7 November 1951) lived 126 Beecroft Road, Beecroft
- Clarence Fisher Newman (1884 – 10 April 1954) lived at 126 Beecroft Road, Beecroft
- (Arnold) Leslie Newman (born 1887) businessman, lived in Epping, New South Wales
- Ivor Vickery Newman PhD married Florence Rewa Burton. He was a botanist, lived Colombo, Ceylon (now Sri Lanka), and author of The living plant;: A laboratory study of its structure, reproduction and general classification 1946; also book of poems, privately published 1924. Rewa was a daughter of Rev. J. W. Burton. Son Ian Anstruther Newman was a biophysicist.
- Eben Vickery Newman married Yolande Margery Ena Smith on 24 January 1934, lived in Queanbeyan. He was author of Does it make sense? Epworth Press, Sydney 1944, and Freedom and Control : a Christian interpretation S.C.M. Press, London, 1946. Their son Sandy Newman (1937–2013) was a conductor, founder of the Taverner Consort of Voices, Sydney in 1975.

Their last residence was "Tip Tree", in Strathfield

== Recognition ==
A pair of stained glass windows was installed in Strathfield Methodist church in his memory.
