= Lauriston (disambiguation) =

Lauriston may refer to:

- Lauriston, an area of central Edinburgh, Scotland
- Lauriston, Victoria, a town in Australia
- Lauriston, New Zealand, a village in New Zealand
- Lauriston Castle, a 16th-century tower house in Edinburgh, Scotland
- Lauriston Girls' School, a private day and boarding school for girls in Armadale, Victoria, Australia
- Lauriston, Strathfield, an historic house in the Sydney suburb of Strathfield, New South Wales, Australia
- Jacques Lauriston, a French soldier and diplomat of Scottish descent
- Jean Law de Lauriston, twice Governor General of Pondicherry
- Jesse Lauriston Livermore, an early-20th-century American stock trader
- Lauriston (HBC vessel), operated by the HBC from 1916 to 1917, see Hudson's Bay Company vessels

== See also ==
- Laurieston (disambiguation)
