= John Shorter Pty Ltd =

Australian manufacturers' importing agency company

- Type: Private
- Industry: Marketing and importing
- Founded: 1884
- Headquarters: Clarence Street, Sydney, Australia
- Key people: John Shorter (founder), Arthur Shorter, Austin Shorter, and Lulu Shorter

John Shorter Pty Ltd, commonly known as Shorters, was an Australian manufacturers’ importing agency company, best known as the Australasian agent for the British ceramics firms Royal Doulton and Mintons. John Shorter Pty Ltd remained the Doulton agents in Australia until 1979, when Royal Doulton Australia was established. The family and business were, through two generations, major donors to the Museum of Applied Arts & Sciences in Sydney.

== Headquarters ==
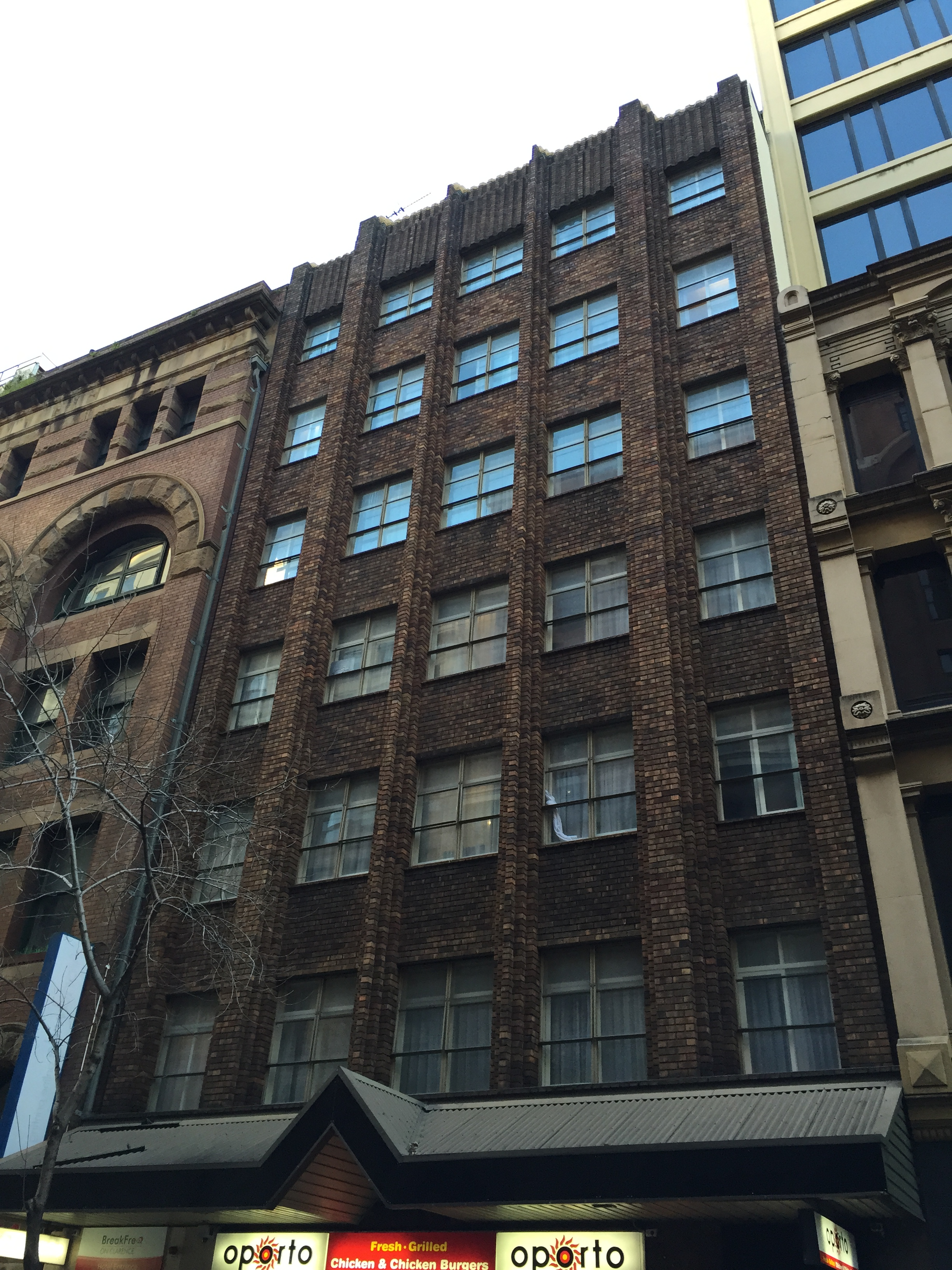
Shorter House, Clarence Street, Sydney

Shorter House at 193–195 Clarence Street, Sydney, was completed in 1938 at a cost of £26,000. The building has a frontage of 40 feet and a depth of 83 feet and is of reinforced concrete faced in warm colored textured brick. On opening, the company occupied the basement, fourth, fifth, and sixth floors. The Building was designed by Robertson, Marks, and McCreadie.

== Shorter family ==
John Shorter was born in Staffordshire, England, in 1853 and came to Sydney in 1879 to install the Doulton display in the Garden Palace for the Sydney International Exhibition. He died on 30 January 1942.

He married his New South Wales-born wife Emily Jane Shorter, née Butler, in 1883. She was an artist and bore Shorter seven children.

Their first son, Arthur Shorter, was in born 1884 and was educated at Newington College (1898–1900). He worked for the family company and became a trustee of the Museum of Applied Arts & Sciences in Sydney. He died in 1957.

Their first daughter, Lulu Shorter (born Lucie Emilie Shorter in 1887), was educated at the Wesleyan Ladies’ College and became a china painter and designer. The Powerhouse Museum has her work in its collection and the National Gallery of Australia hold her designs in pen-and-ink. She died aged 102 in 1989, having never married.

Their third child, Austin Shorter (born John Austin Butler Shorter in 1889), attended Newington College and served in World War I. A slip cast, bone china Royal Doulton figurine, HN322 Digger (Australian), was modeled on him by Ernest W. Light. The standing figure is of Austin dressed in military uniform, with the rising sun insignia on his slouch hat. He looks forward, with both hands in the pockets of his breeches, and his right foot slightly forward. The figure is positioned on a dark green enamel circular base, which has the word 'digger' incised at the front of the base. Incised on the left-hand side of the base is the word 'light', the word incised on the right-hand side is less illegible but is 'horse'. In 1921 Austin married Agnes McCredie the youngest daughter of the late George McCredie MLA of Linnwood, Guildford. Austin became a director of Shorters, and died in 1982.

Four more daughters were born in the next eight years: Constance in 1891; Elsie in 1893; Dorothy in 1895; and Elaine in 1903. Elaine Shorter studied law at the University of Sydney and on graduating was awarded the Rose Scott Prize for Proficiency at Graduation by a female graduate. She was articled to the Sydney solicitor Alfred Mitchell of Culwulla Chambers in Castlereagh Street, Sydney, and went on to serve at the Sydney Bar.

From 1905 the Shorter family resided at Harborne a substantial stone home built in 1858 in Boundary Street, Parramatta. The house was willed to Lulu and Elaine on Jane Shorter’s death in 1943. The home was sold by the spinster Shorter sisters in 1953.

John Shorter (1912-2006), the grandson of the John Shorter (1853-1942), went on to run the family business. He was the eldest of five children of Arthur Shorter (1884-1957). He introduced the Thermos flask to Australia through a link to the British patent-holder in 1934. In the 2000s Shorter outfitted establishments such as the Melbourne Club and the Melbourne Cricket Club with high-class restaurant crockery produced by Dudson from the United Kingdom. Through his connection with Royal Doulton Shorter was well known to Australian pottery and china collectors. He worked for 70 years for Shorters in Clarence Street. The Powerhouse Museum has one of the finest collections of Doulton in the world due to donations from Shorter family. Museum items such as the one metre high Raby red vase decorated by Edward Raby are now valued at over $300,000.
