= Elizabeth Dennis =

Elizabeth Dennis is the name of:

- Liz Dennis (Elizabeth Salisbury Dennis, born 1943), Australian plant molecular biologist
- Elizabeth Dennis, leader of North Hertfordshire council in England 2021–2024
