= Susie O'Reilly =

Australian obstetrician (1881-1960)

- Born: Susannah Hennessy O'Reilly; 25 January 1881; Sydney, New South Wales
- Died: 18 June 1960 (aged 79); Pymble, New South Wales, Australia
- Education: University of Sydney (BSc 1903, MB ChM 1905)
- Occupation: Physician
- Years active: 1905–48

Susie O'Reilly (25 January 1881 – 18 June 1960) was an Australian family doctor and obstetrician. She practiced on the North Shore in Sydney in the first half of the 20th century. Despite graduating fourth in her year from Medicine at the University of Sydney, her application for residency at Sydney Hospital in 1905 was rejected in favour of male applicants with a poorer academic record.

== Early life and education ==
Susannah Hennessy O'Reilly was born in Sydney, 25 January 1881. She was the third of eight children. Her parents were Mary Narcissa O'Reilly (née Taylor) and Walter William Joseph O'Reilly. Her father, grandfather and great-grandfather were all physicians, as were three of Susie's siblings: her brothers, Linnell (1879–1948) and Merrick (1892–1957) and her sister Olive (1892-1976), all of whom graduated from Medicine at the University of Sydney and who were appointed to Sydney Hospital in 1906, Perth General Hospital in 1914, and Brisbane General Hospital in 1916, respectively. Both Olive and Merrick worked in the family practice in Pymble. Her brother Walter Cresswell O'Reilly (1877–1954), was a public servant and film censor.

O'Reilly attended the Methodist Ladies College, Burwood from 1894 to 1898. She was dux of the school in 1897 and passed her senior year in 1898, matriculating with first class honours in French.

She graduated from the University of Sydney with a Bachelor of Science in 1903 and a Bachelor of Medicine and Master of Surgery in 1905.

== Career ==
After graduation, O'Reilly applied for a residency at Sydney University in 1905, whereupon she was rejected in favour of five men. Two of these had come first and second, respectively, in their graduating year, but the other three had received only pass degrees in comparison with O'Reilly's top four placing and honours degree. Although the Women's Progressive Association of New South Wales had been advised by Sydney Hospital two years earlier that "when it is necessary to make appointments to the medical staff, applications are invited through the press, with no restrictions as to sex", the board offered the excuse that there was no suitable accommodation for a female resident medical officer. While this may have been the case, aspiring female physicians in Sydney had a difficult time being accepted into the hospital system.

Women were first admitted to the Sydney Medical School (founded in 1856) in 1885, and the first females graduated in 1893. Reports from the time suggest that this attitude was in contrast to favourable opportunities to study medicine, where no distinctions in teaching were made between the sexes at the Sydney Medical School. O'Reilly's rejection became the focus of media attention and public debate in the form of editorials and letters to the newspapers about the discrimination and roles of female doctors.

In 1906, the Royal Prince Alfred Hospital began to admit female residents and the Sydney Hospital began admitting female residents in 1910.

Instead, O'Reilly undertook an internship at the Royal Adelaide Hospital in 1906-1907, the Queen Victoria Hospital, Melbourne, and the Royal Hospital for Women, Paddington, and joined her father's practice in Sydney in 1908 where she worked until her retirement in 1948.

In 1921, she co-founded the New South Wales Association of Registered Medical Women and, in 1922, was made a foundation member of the Rachel Forster Hospital for Women and Children working there as a consulting physician from 1926-1941 and holding a position as Life Governor from 1959 to her death in 1960.

She also co-founded the Old Girls' Union at her school MLC Burwood, serving as its president; was a medical adviser to the Presbyterian Ladies' College, Pymble, and the Kindergarten Training College, Waverley, and a foundation member of the National Trust of Australia.

== Personal life ==
O'Reilly was a bushwalker, botanist, and a foundation member of the National Trust of Australia. She died on 18 June 1960 at her home in Pymble, New South Wales. She was cremated.
