= Ruby Payne-Scott Medal and Lecture =

Australian biological and physical science award

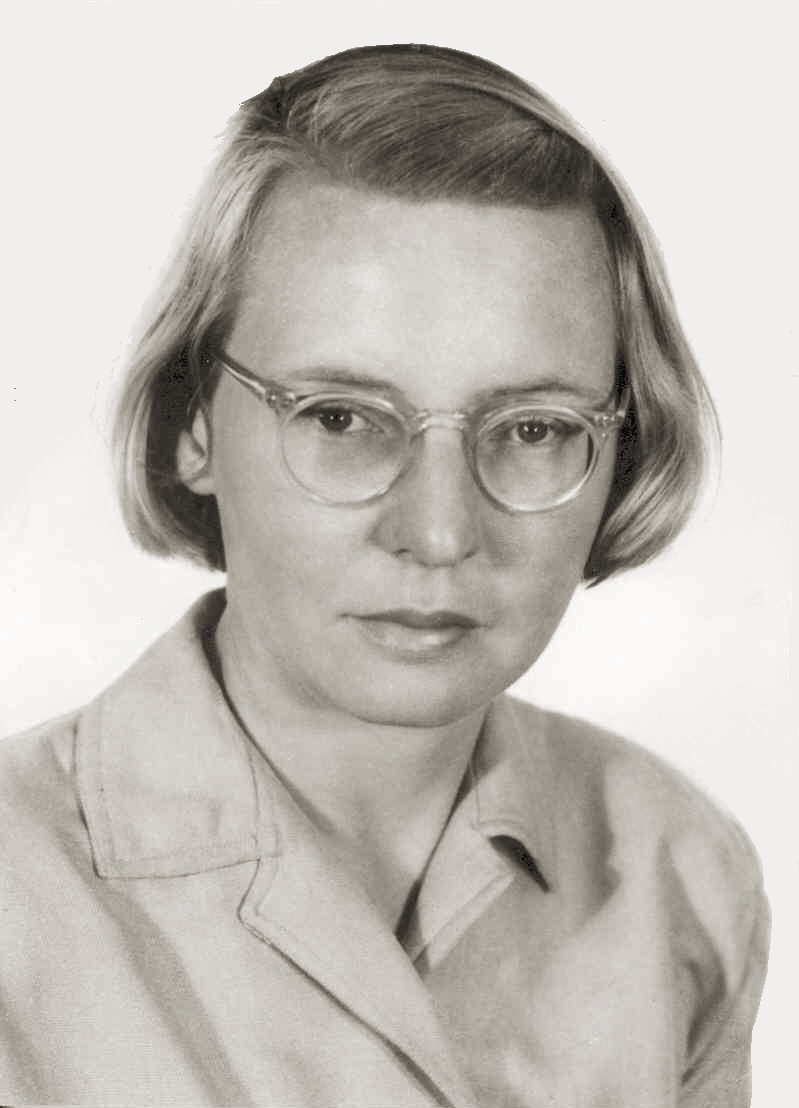
Ruby Payne-Scott (1912–1981) Australian pioneer in radiophysics and radio astronomy.

The Ruby Payne-Scott Medal and Lecture for women in science is a distinguished career award that acknowledges outstanding Australian women researchers in the biological sciences or physical science. It is conferred by the Australian Academy of Science and is awarded to researchers who are usually resident in, and conduct their research predominantly in Australia.

This award, established in 2021, honours the contributions of Ruby Payne-Scott, particularly in the fields of radiophysics and radio astronomy.

== Recipients ==
Year	Recipients		Contribution
2021	Cheryl Praeger	Mathematics	has made groundbreaking contributions to group theory and combinatorics. Her work centers on the mathematics of symmetry, particularly in the context of finite simple groups. Actively involved in gender diverse education in the mathematics fields.
2022	Liz Dennis	plant molecular biology	has made significant contributions to our understanding of plant development, vernalization-induced flowering, and increasing the yield of hybrid varieties. Her analysis of the basis of hybrid vigor has been exceptional in Arabidopsis and also in rice. She has worked to overcome the first-generation limitations for hybrids and so ensure continuous high food grain production.
2023	Jennifer Graves	Genetics	Researched the genetic diversity of Australian animals and introduced new theories on the origin and evolution of the human sex chromosomes and sex determination.
2024	Kerrie Mengersen	Statistics	Has developed new statistical methodology, and explored real-world applications, such as digital and citizen science data, and the intersection between statistics, machine learning and artificial intelligence. An Australian pioneer and leader in Bayesian statistics.
2025	Jane Visvader	Biology	contribution to breast cancer research
2026	Zaiping Guo	Engineering	for research on battery materials, using synchrotron and neutron techniques to understand how they behave during operation.
