= Zaiping Guo =

Australian engineer and academic

Zaiping Guo is an Australian engineer and academic. She specializes in nanomaterials for lithium-ion batteries used in electric vehicles and portable equipment. She headed the Institute of Superconducting and Electronic Materials at the University of Wollongong before winning an Australian Research Council grant for a five-year project in the same field at the University of Adelaide, where she is currently a professor.

In 2023 she was elected a Fellow of the Australian Academy of Science (FAA) and of the Australian Academy of Technological Sciences and Engineering (FTSE).

In 2026 she was awarded the Ruby Payne-Scott Medal and Lecture for women in science.
