= Freida Ruth Heighway =

Australian gynaecologist and obstetrician

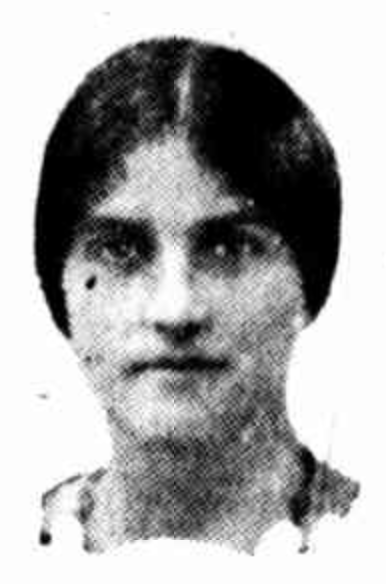
Freida Ruth Heighway c.1930

Freida Ruth Heighway (1907–1963) was an Australian obstetrician and gynaecologist, the first woman to graduate from Sydney University with a medical degree and the first woman admitted to the Royal College of Obstetricians and Gynaecologists.

== Early life and education ==
Freida Heighway was born on 2 June 1907, the only child of Mr and Mrs F. S. Heighway. She grew up in Burwood, New South Wales. Heighway attended Methodist Ladies College in Burwood, graduating in 1925. She then attended the University of Sydney and graduated with a Master of Business (1930), Bachelor of Science (1930) and Doctor of Medicine (1939). She graduated MB BS with honours in 1930, and was the first woman at the University of Sydney to receive the degree of Doctor of Medicine.

== Career ==
Heighway began her medical career as a two-year Resident Medical Officer at the Royal Prince Alfred and North Shore Hospital. Later, she travelled to Manchester, England, to work as a medical resident and trained in obstetrics and gynaecology.

In 1932 Heighway moved to England and continued work as a Resident Medical Officer at St Mary's Hospital in Manchester. Upon return to Australia in 1934, Heighway then set up her own private practice in Burwood, New South Wales. She then took rooms in Macquarie Street and obtained honorary appointments at the Rachel Forster Hospital for Women and Children and The Women's Hospital, Crown Street.

In 1945, Heighway moved with her husband, Andrew Arthur Abbie, and three daughters to Adelaide, where she found that the obstetrics field was dominated by men and she set up a solo specialist practice which grew rapidly. Although her work was centred on the Queen Victoria Maternity Hospital, she also cared for patients at the Royal Adelaide and Queen Elizabeth hospitals.

== Awards and honours ==
- Fellow of the Royal College of Obstetricians and Gynaecologists
- The Ruth Heighway Memorial Prize and Medal for obstetrics is awarded by the University of Adelaide in her honour
