= Andrew Arthur Abbie =

Australian anatomist and anthropologist

- Born: February 8, 1905; Gillingham, Kent
- Died: July 22, 1976 (aged 71); Unley Park, South Australia
- Other names: A. A. Abbie
- Occupations: Anatomist; Anthropologist

Andrew Arthur Abbie, also known as A. A. Abbie (8 February 1905 – 22 July 1976) was an Australian anatomist and anthropologist.

== Biography ==
Born in Gillingham, Kent, Abbie was educated at a mathematical school in Rochester where he obtained a scholarship which enabled him to graduate from the University of London in 1922. Soon after the family immigrated in Australia, where he enrolled in medicine at Sydney University, obtaining a master's degree in 1929. He became medical officer at the Royal Prince Alfred Hospital a year later, and then won a scholarship that permitted him to return to England and pursue a doctorate in anatomy at University College, London (1934). On returning to Sydney later that year he married the gynaecologist Freida Ruth Heighway.

He was called up for military service in 1941, given the rank of major and, after training in the Chemical Warfare Physiology school at Melbourne University, instructed army personnel how to treat casualties affected by chemical warfare, such as gases. He left the army in 1944, to take up the Elder chair of anatomy and histology at the University of Adelaide in December, and quickly rose to be dean of the faculty. Abbie had always been interested in ethnography, an interest reflected professionally in his being twice (1948 and 1959) appointed president of the Anthropological Society of South Australia, and in leading expeditions from 1951 to 1969 across South Australian and the Northern Territory make anthropometricala and social studies of the indigenous peoples. The data he collected was eventually written up in his book, The Original Australians (1969). Abbie insisted on the essential homogeneity of Australian aborigines, and opposed the Barrinean hypothesis that had originally been advanced by Joseph Birdsell, and supported by the Australian ethnographer Norman Tindale.

Abbie published over 120 scientific papers. He retired in 1970, and died six years later at Unley Park.

== Personal ==
Abbie married gynaecologist Freida Ruth Heighway (2 June 1907 – 30 December 1963) in 1934.

On 14 February 1967 he married again, to Audrey Katherine Allen Simpson (30 January 1917 – 27 February 2014). Simpson, a physiotherapist, was a daughter of industrialist Alfred Allen Simpson.
