= Phyllis Margery Anderson =

Australian pathologist

- Born: 13 January 1901; Petersham, New South Wales, Australia
- Died: 29 November 1957 (aged 56); Royal Prince Alfred Hospital
- Education: Methodist Ladies' College, Burwood; University of Sydney (M.B., Ch.M., 1925)
- Occupation: Pathologist
- Years active: 1926–1957
- Known for: founder of the Medical Women's Society of New South Wales; women's representative on the council of the State branch of the British Medical Association (1951–1954); fellow of the Royal Australasian College of Physicians; Phyllis Anderson Research Fellowship established after her death
- Medical career
- Research: gastroenteritis, glycogen-accumulation disease, diphtheria, malaria, tuberculosis, whooping-cough

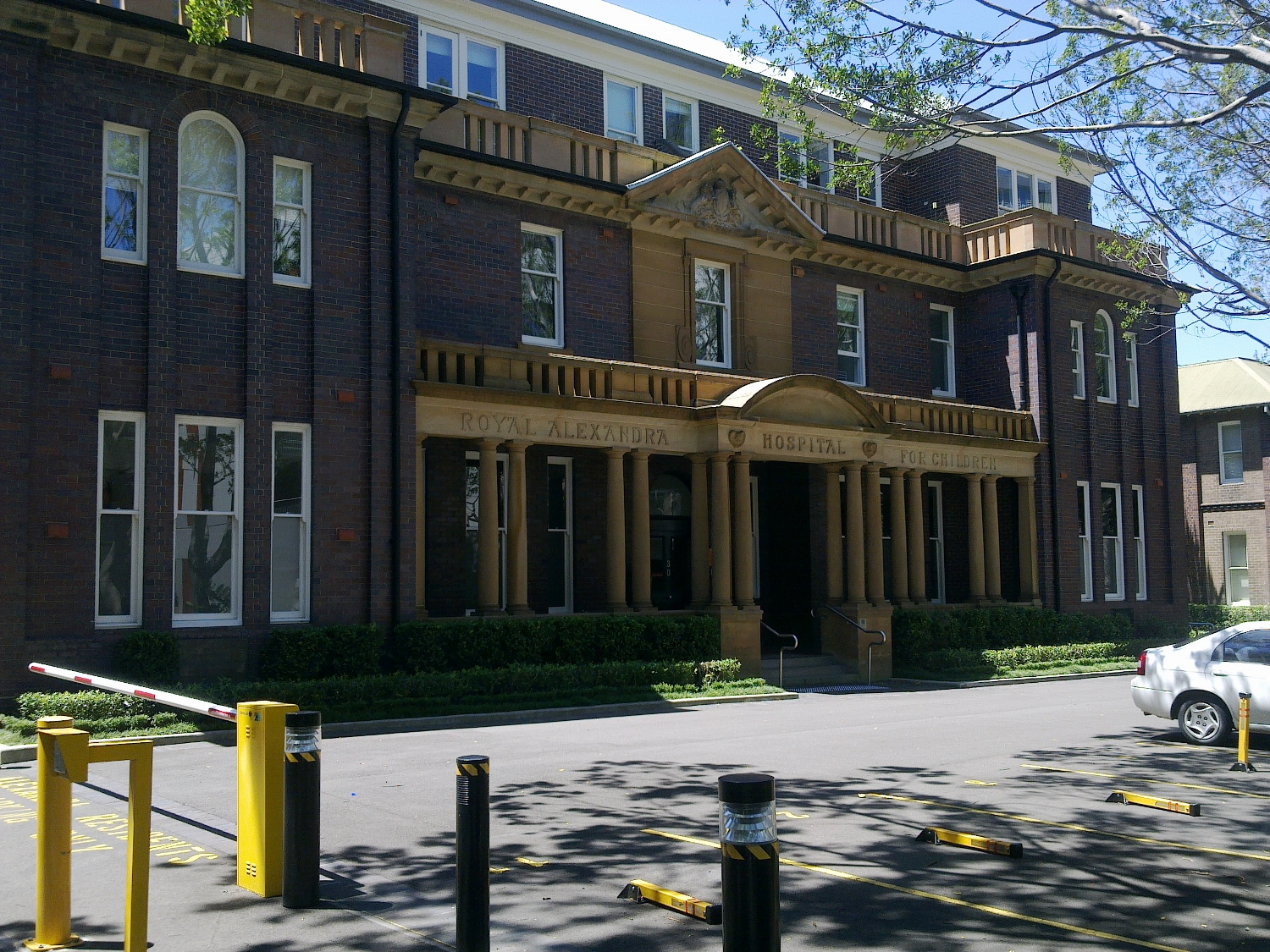
Royal Alexandra Hospital for Children (Camperdown)

Phyllis Margery Anderson (13 January 1901 – 29 November 1957) was an Australian pathologist.

== Early life ==
The only child of James Robert Anderson, a medical practitioner, and Mary Kendall, Phyllis Anderson was born in Petersham, New South Wales and educated at the Methodist Ladies' College in Burwood. Anderson entered the faculty of medicine and went on to earn an MB and a ChM at the University of Sydney, graduating in 1925.

== Career ==
She became a pathologist, at the Royal Alexandra Hospital for Children in 1926 after training with Dr Tidswell an outstanding pathologist himself. Anderson was a senior pathologist at the Royal Alexandra Hospital for Children from 1927 to 1940. She was admitted to membership of the Royal Australasian College of Physicians in 1938. From 1941 to 1946, she was a member of the bacteriology department of the University of Sydney. In 1945, she became a teaching fellow at the university; she later became a part-time lecturer.

In 1928, Anderson founded the Medical Women's Society of New South Wales and she served as its president from 1945 to 1946.

== Personal life ==
In her personal life Phyllis Anderson had a deep interest in music, dancing and literature, making a contribution to the development of training for ballet in Australia. She was a member of the overseas advisory committee of the then Royal Academy of Dance, providing medical advice on the award of the overseas scholarships and assisting in the arrangements for the celebrated tour of Dame Margot Fonteyn in 1957.

== Later life ==
Upon her death Anderson made gifts of £500 each to the Royal Alexandra Hospital, the Rachel Forster Hospital for Women and Children and the Royal Australasian College of Physicians. The remainder of her fortune was left to the University of Sydney. Anderson died at the Royal Prince Alfred Hospital in Sydney of hypertensive cerebrovascular disease at the age of 56. A research fellowship was established in her name in 1959.
