= Kerrie Mengersen =

Australian statistician

Kerrie Mengersen FAA FASSA
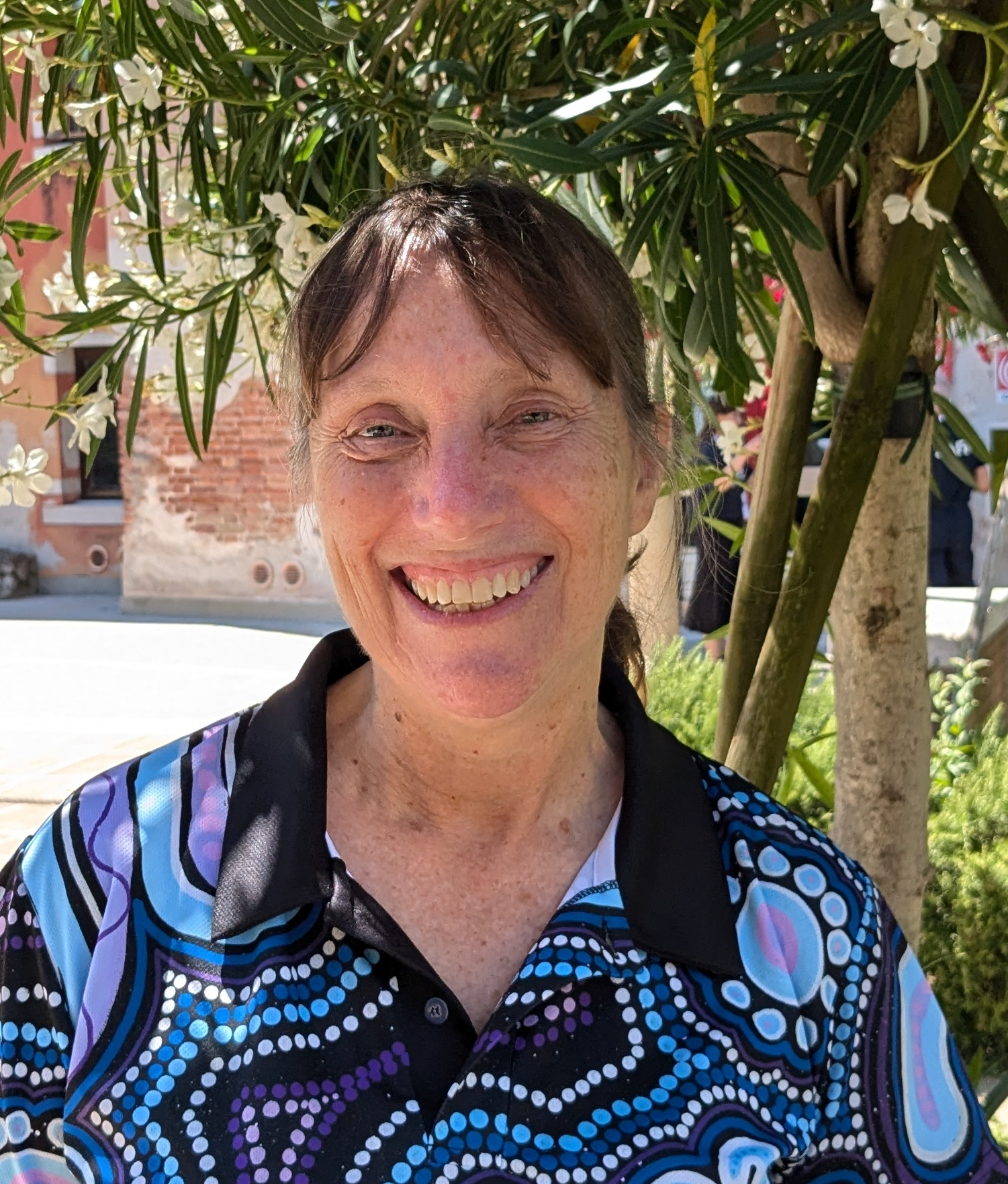
- Kerrie Mengersen in 2024
- Born: 1962 (age 63–64)
- Education: University of New England
- Awards: Australian Laureate Fellowship 2015
- Scientific career
- Fields: Statistics
- Workplaces: Queensland University of Technology; University of Newcastle; Central Queensland University; Bond University
- Thesis: Comparison and Selection of Populations with Special Reference to the Normal Distribution (1988)
- Doctoral advisors: Eve Bofinger; Richard Tweedie

Kerrie Mengersen (born 1962) is an Australian statistician. She is a Professor of Statistics at Queensland University of Technology, and 2024 winner of the Ruby Payne-Scott Medal and Lecture from the Australian Academy of Science.

== Education and career ==
Mengersen earned BA (Hons I) and PhD degrees in mathematics, majoring in Statistics and Computing, from the University of New England (Armidale, New South Wales, Australia) in 1985 and 1989, respectively. She is the Director of the Bayesian Research and Applications Group (BRAG) within QUT's School of Mathematical Sciences, a member of the university's Centre for Data Science, and was Deputy Director of the former Australian Research Council (ARC) Centre of Excellence for Mathematical and Statistical Frontiers (ACEMS) of Big Data, Big Models, New Insights.

She has co-authored three books and edited two, and has written 27 book chapters and approximately 250 journal articles. Her research covers a broad spectrum of statistical practice, from theory to its applications. She is primarily known for her work in Bayesian statistics and meta-analysis, and has worked in applications of statistics in medicine and environmental science. In 2016, she was the first woman to be awarded the Statistical Society of Australia's Pitman Medal, which recognises outstanding achievement in the statistics discipline. She talks about new challenges for statisticians in a YouTube video. She has contributed to Australian biosecurity efforts. In October 2015, her research in building virtual habitats was highlighted on the ABC.

Mengersen was the National President of the Statistical Society of Australia (SSAI) in 2013, and was the International President of the International Society for Bayesian Analysis (ISBA) in 2016. As of 2022, she is a member of the Academy Council of the Queensland Academy of Arts and Sciences.

== Honours and awards ==
- 2014 Elected Fellow of the International Society for Bayesian Analysis
- Elected Fellow of the Institute of Mathematical Statistics
- Elected Fellow of the Society for Modelling and Simulation
- 2015 Biennial Medalist of the Modelling and Simulation Society of Australia and New Zealand (MSSANZ)
- 2015 Australian Research Council Laureate Fellowship
- 2016 Statistical Society of Australia Pitman Medal
- 2018 Elected Fellow of the Australian Academy of Science (FAA)
- 2018 Elected Fellow of the Academy of the Social Sciences in Australia (FASSA)
- 2024 Ruby Payne-Scott Medal and Lecture from the Australian Academy of Science
