= Laurieston =

Laurieston may refer to the following places in Scotland:

- Laurieston, Dumfries and Galloway, see List of United Kingdom locations: La-Laz#Lap–Laz
- Laurieston, Falkirk
- Laurieston, Glasgow

== See also ==
- Lauriston (disambiguation)
