= Jane Visvader =

Australian academic

Jane Visvader FRS FAA FAHMS
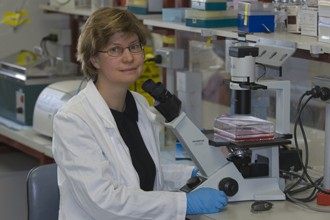
- Education: University of Adelaide
- Scientific career
- Workplaces: Walter and Eliza Hall Institute of Medical Research; Salk Institute

Jane Visvader is a scientist specialising in breast cancer research who works for the Walter and Eliza Hall Institute in Melbourne, Australia. She is the joint head of the Breast Cancer Laboratory with Geoff Lindeman.

== Education ==
Visvader holds a PhD in Biochemistry from the University of Adelaide having studied structure and function of citrus exocortis viroid

== Career and research ==
After her PhD in the Department of Biochemistry at the University of Adelaide, she was a postdoctoral researcher with Inder Verma (Salk Institute, San Diego) and Jerry Adams (Walter and Eliza Hall Institute (WEHI)). She worked at the Children's Hospital/Harvard Medical School in Boston before returning to Victoria in 1997 to establish a Breast Cancer Laboratory at WEHI.

Visvader has published work investigating the role of cells of origin in cancer and in particular focuses on the role of stem cells, which she believes may be a key to understanding breast cancer. She was elected to the Australian Academy of Science in 2012 and is currently (January 2022 - December 2027) a member of the International Exchanges Committee. The International Exchanges scheme allows a flexible platform for UK based scientists to interact with scientists around the world.

Visvader is a board member of the Cancer Council Victoria, Medical & Scientific Committee.

=== Patents ===
Visvader is a named inventor on five patents relating to cancer research focused on stem cell isolation and diagnostics.

- Method Of Cell Isolation, Application number: 20080038230
- Differentiation and/or proliferation modulating agents and uses therefor, Application number: 20060166917
- Novel phosphoprotein, Application number: 20060148032
- Method of diagnosis and treatment and agents useful for same, Application number: 20050048528
- Differentiation and/or proliferation modulating agents and uses therefore, Application number: 20030175971

== Awards and recognition ==
- 2008 GlaxoSmithKline Award for Research Excellence (Joint with Geoff Lindeman)
- 2012 Fellow of the Australian Academy of Science
- 2014 Royal Society of Victoria Research Medal for Scientific Excellence in Biomedical & Health Sciences.
- 2016 National Health and Medical Research Council Elizabeth Blackburn Fellowship
- 2016 Lemberg Medal, Australian Society for Biochemistry and Molecular Biology
- 2016 Fellowship of the Australian Academy of Health and Medical Sciences
- 2017 Victoria Prize for Science & Innovation (Joint with Geoff Lindeman)
- 2020 Fellow of the Royal Society (FRS).
- 2022 Ziskin Prize, Stand Up to Cancer (joint award)
- 2022 Fellow of the American Society of Cancer Research (AACR) Academy
- 2024 Australia Academy of Health and Medical Sciences Outstanding Female Researcher Medal [19]
- 2024 The Buchanan Medal for distinguished contributions to the biomedical sciences (Joint with Geoff Lindeman)
- 2025 Ruby Payne-Scott Medal and Lecture - for groundbreaking contributions to breast cancer research.

== Selected publications ==
- Rios, AC; Fu, NY; Lindeman, GJ; Visvader, JE (20 February 2014). "In situ identification of bipotent stem cells in the mammary gland". Nature. 506 (7488): 322–7. Bibcode:2014Natur.506..322R. doi:10.1038/nature12948. PMID 24463516.
- Nolan E, Vaillant F, Branstetter D, Pal B, Giner G, Whitehead L, Lok SW, Mann GB, Rohrbach K, Huang LY, Soriano R, Smyth GK, Dougall WC, Visvader JE* and Lindeman GJ*. (2016) RANK ligand as a potential target for breast cancer prevention in BRCA1-mutation carriers. Nat Med. 2016 Jun 20. doi: 10.1038/nm.4118. PMID 27322743 equal senior author
- Fu NY, Rios AC, Pal B, Law C, Jamieson P, Liu R, Vaillant F, Jackling F, Liu KH, Smyth GK, Lindeman GJ, Ritchie ME, and Visvader JE. Identification of quiescent and spatially-restricted mammary stem cells that are hormone responsive. Nature Cell Biol. 2017 19(3):164-176 PMID 28192422
- Rios AC, Capaldo BD, Vaillant F, Pal B, van Ineveld R, Dawson CA, Chen Y, Nolan E, Fu NY; 3DTCLSM Group, Jackling FC, Devi S, Clouston D, Whitehead L, Smyth GK, Mueller SN, Lindeman GJ, Visvader JE. Intraclonal Plasticity in Mammary Tumors Revealed through Large-Scale Single-Cell Resolution 3D Imaging. Cancer Cell. 2019 35(4), 618-632 PMID 31185217
- Dawson CA, Pal B, Vaillant F, Gandolfo LC, Liu Z, Bleriot C, Ginhoux F, Smyth GK, Lindeman GJ, Mueller SN, Rios AC, Visvader JE. Tissue-resident ductal macrophages survey the mammary epithelium and facilitate tissue remodelling. Nature Cell Biol. 2020 22(5), 546-558. PMID 32341550
- Pal B, Chen Y, Vaillant F, Capaldo BD, Joyce R, Song X, Bryant VL, Penington JS, Di Stephano L, Tubau Ribera N, Wilcox S, Mann, GB, kConFab, Papenfuss AT, Lindeman GJ, Smyth GK*, Visvader JE*. A single-cell RNA expression atlas of normal, preneoplastic and tumorigenic states in the human breast. EMBO J. 2021 40(11): e107333 PMID 33950524 *equal senior authors
- Nolan E, Lindeman, G, Visvader JE Deciphering breast cancer: from biology to the clinic. Cell 2023 Volume 186, Issue 8
