= Lauriston, Strathfield =

Lauriston
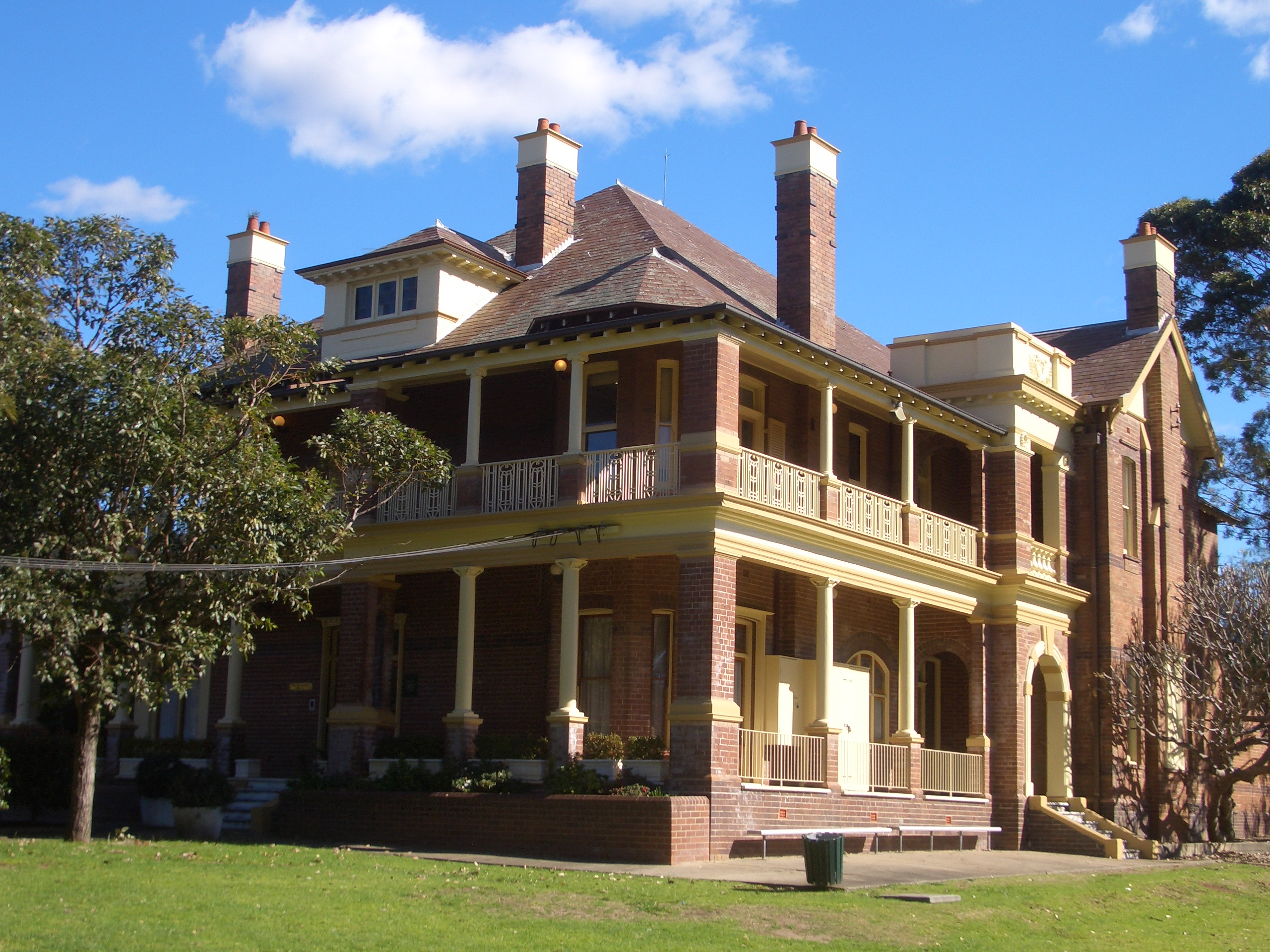
- Interactive map of the Lauriston area

General information
- Type: House
- Architectural style: Federation Free Style
- Location: Cnr The Boulevarde and Margaret Street Strathfield, New South Wales 2135 Australia
- Coordinates: 33°52′30″S 151°05′36″E
- Completed: 1907
- Governing body: Santa Sabina College

Design and construction
- Architect: Alfred Newman

Website
- Strathfield Heritage

Lauriston is a historic house in the Sydney suburb of Strathfield. The house is now located within the grounds of Santa Maria Del Monte, the junior campus of Santa Sabina College, and is situated on the corner of The Boulevarde and Margaret Street, Strathfield. It is a heritage listed item on the Municipality of Strathfield's Local Environmental Plan.

== History ==
Amy Alfreda Vickery (1867-1942) built Lauriston in 1907. She was the daughter of Ebenezer Vickery (1827-1906), a merchant, manufacturer, philanthropist and politician. Following her father's death, Amy Vickery's cousin, Alfred Newman, designed her new house. She was a stamp collector and won gold medals in stamp exhibitions in Sydney in 1932 and 1938. Her collection is now on permanent loan to the Powerhouse Museum and numbers over 1,800 mounted pages. Following Vickery's death in 1942, the property was leased by the Presbyterian Ladies' College, Sydney. Four years later Trinity Grammar School Preparatory School as a sub-primary school and boarding house. The school bought the property in 1951 for £21,000. The Dominican Sisters purchased Lauriston in 1967 after Trinity amalgamated its whole prep school at Llandilo, further south on The Boulevarde. Having purchased the property for over $200,000 Lauriston joined Brunyarra as part of the junior school of Santa Sabina College.
