= Pamela Anne Wills =

Australian biologist and radiologist (1927–1999)

Pamela Anne Wills (4 December 1927 – 10 June 1999) was an Australian research biologist and radiology scientist. She developed development of industrial uses for radiation particularly in relation to insect control, notably to save bee populations, and radiation sterilisation of medical products and equipment. She was also an advocate for food irradiation.

== Biography ==
Wills was born in Rockdale and spent her childhood in Cronulla, both suburbs of Sydney. She went to school at St George Girls High School before completing her leaving certificate at the Methodist Ladies' College in 1944.

In 1945 she then enrolled at the University of Sydney where she majored in chemistry and biochemistry and she graduated in 1948. After graduation Wills worked as a biochemist at the Royal Hospital for Women until 1950 when she worked as assistant librarian at the Imperial Chemical Industries of Australia and New Zealand (now Orica).

In April 1951 Wills went hitchhiking in Europe and, midway through this trip, she took work at various stages including as a researcher for the biophysicist EJ Harris at the University of London for six months in 1952. It was here that she worked with radioactive isotopes for the first time and developed a fascination with them.

Upon her return to Australia Wills took a role as a biomechanist at the Australian Institute of Anatomy where she began in August 1953 and shortly afterwards she undertook a secondment to the South Pacific Commission in Nouméa in New Caledonia. This role cemented her interest in working in nutrition and food science.

In April 1957 she decided to return to England to study nutrition at the University of London where she completed a thesis on lipid excretion. While there she again took the opportunity to travel, including a trip through Spain on a scooter.

Wills returned again to Australian in 1960 where she began working at the Australian Atomic Energy Commission in Sydney where she would work for the next 28 years where she quickly advanced to the position of Senior Principal Research Scientist; she was the first woman to have such a senior position. There she focused on the development of industrial uses for radiation including in regards to insect control, medical instrument sterilisation and food irradiation. One of her major breakthroughs in this area was in irradiation beehives to reduce the spread of a fatal blood disease. She used similar methods to control the spread of the Bactrocera tryoni (Queensland fruit fly). Wills was also particularly interested in using radiation to prevent crop loss and encourage food growth and improvement which, despite her advocacy for internationally, was banned until after her death.

Wills retired in from the AAEC in 1988 and worked as a consultant on radiation processing for a number of organisations, including the World Health Organization. In 1991 she suffered a cerebral haemorrhage and gave up her consultancy work and died 10 June 1999 in Sydney.

== Collections ==
A collection of Wills papers in available through the Adolph Basses Library at the Australian Academy of Science: Pamela Anne Wills – Records, 1956–2001, MS 214.

Wills' family also published a bulletin, "The Pamela Wills Bulletin" after her death containing photocopied letters from Wills to friends while she was in hospital which was accompanied by a letter from her friend Shirley Miller announcing her death.
