= Joan Beck =

Australian archaeologist and fencer

Joan Margret Beck
- Born: 2 December 1918; Summer Hill, New South Wales, Australia
- Died: 14 January 2014 (aged 95); New South Wales, Australia
- Occupations: Fencer, fencing instructor, archeologist
- Parent(s): Edward Beck and Dora Beck (née Young)
- Relatives: John Young, building contractor and Mayor of Sydney

Joan Margret Beck, BEM, (1918-2014) was an Australian archaeologist and fencer.

== Early life and education ==
She studied at MLC School, Burwood and Bjelke-Petersen School of Physical Culture, and after retiring from fencing, at Macquarie University.

== Sport and fencing ==
In 1937 associate teacher at Bjelke-Petersen School of Physical Culture. After being introduced to fencing she was instrumental in the development of fencing in Australia in the mid-20th century. At the Swords Club she was coached by Owen Weingott. She provided instruction in fencing in England (in 1951, she earned the title Professor of Fencing from the British Academy of Fencing) and later throughout the Sydney region, in schools, universities including the Australian College of Physical Education, and health settings, such as the Royal North Shore Hospital introducing fencing to paraplegic athletes, including Daphne Ceeney, and to Olympic athletes. 1952 Beck took the position of head coach at the Swords Club and found new premises at Bjelke-Petersen. Between 1952 – 1972 Beck trained state and national teams and prepared participants for every Empire and Commonwealth games.

== Archeology ==
She studied archeology at Macquarie University and had extensive contact with Professor Naguib Kanawati, she worked on digs and went to Egypt 11 times and Greece 14 times. She supported the development of the Rundle Foundation for Egyptian Archaeology at Macquarie University and was instrumental in it becoming an active, heavily subscribed society. In 1992 her services to the University and to Egyptology led to the award of 'Honorary Fellow of Macquarie University'; this was one of the first awards of its kind.

There is a significant collection of Beck's papers held at the State Library of New South Wales.
