= Lulu Shorter =

Australian designer

Lucie Emile Shorter (31 July 1887 – 12 August 1989), better known as Lulu Shorter was an Australian designer best known for her product designs, including the first commercially successful Australian designs for Royal Doulton.

== Biography ==
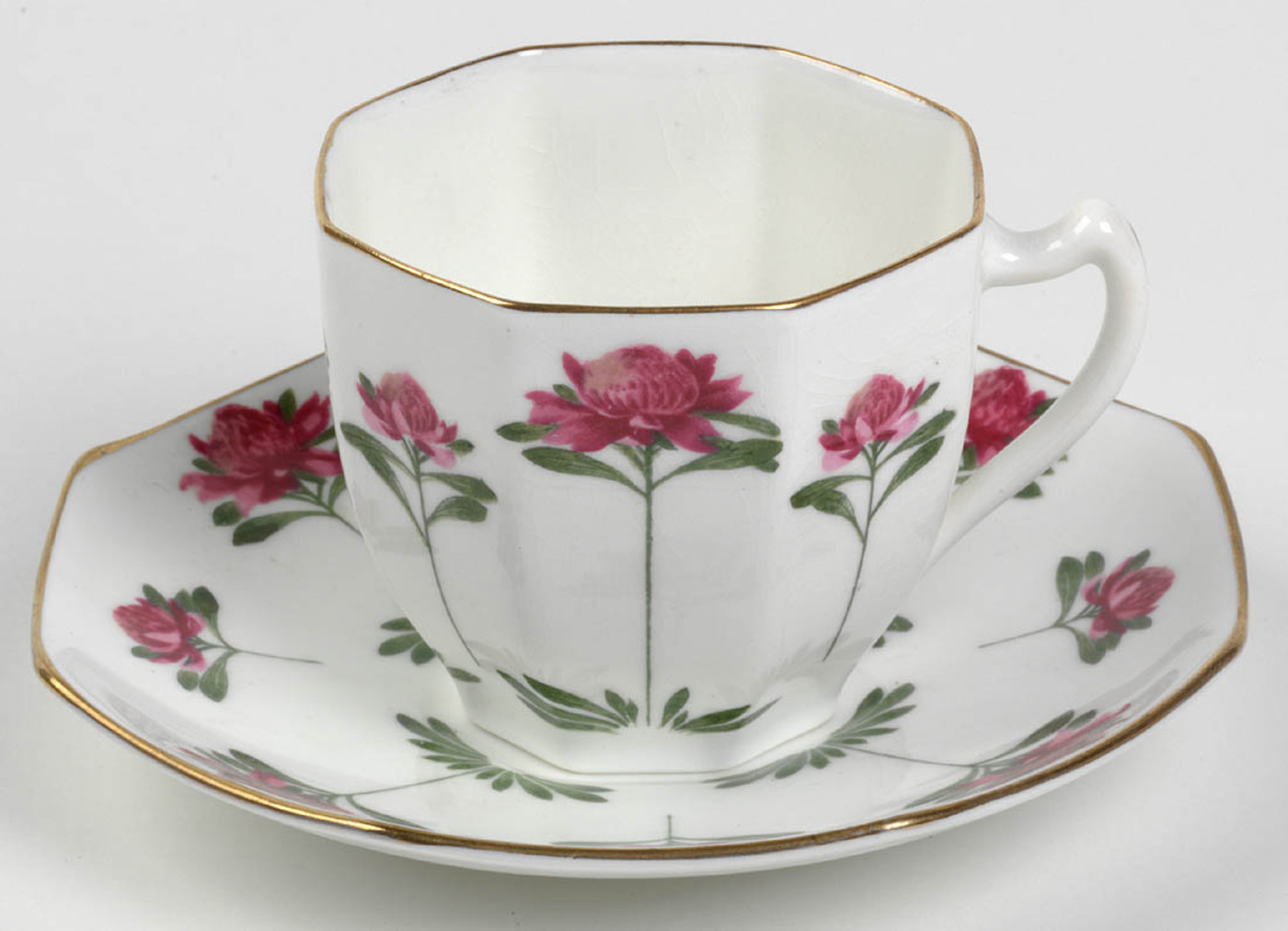
Cup and saucer owned by Miles Franklin, designed by Lucie Shorter, held by State Library of New South Wales

Lucie Shorter was born in the Sydney suburb of Burwood in 1887. She was the eldest of the seven children of John Shorter. John Shorter Pty Ltd, commonly known as Shorters, was an Australian manufacturers’ importing agency company, best known as the Australasian agent for the British ceramics firms Royal Doulton and Mintons. John Shorter Pty Ltd remained the Doulton agents in Australia until 1979, when Royal Doulton Australia was established. The family and business were, through two generations, major donors to the Museum of Applied Arts and Sciences in Sydney. Her mother was also a gifted artist who had studied under Louis Bilton.

Shorter attended Wesleyan Ladies’ College and studied art at Granville Technical College under Alfred Coffey. After travelling to England for six months with her father in 1908, she studied at the National Art School, East Sydney Technical College. She returned to the United Kingdom numerous times.

She painted ceramics for Royal Doulton. Her Waratah cup and saucer was part of their first commercially successful Australian design and was used by writer Miles Franklin who reportedly gave guests turns to use it. Being a free-lance artist, Shorter was not paid for her design, but given a large Edward Raby vase instead. The Waratah Cup is held alongside her publication The Book of the Waratah Cup as part of the collection of the State Library of New South Wales. Her work is also held in the National Gallery of Australia, and includes examples from the full waratah dinner set, in addition to numerous drawings.
