= MLC School =

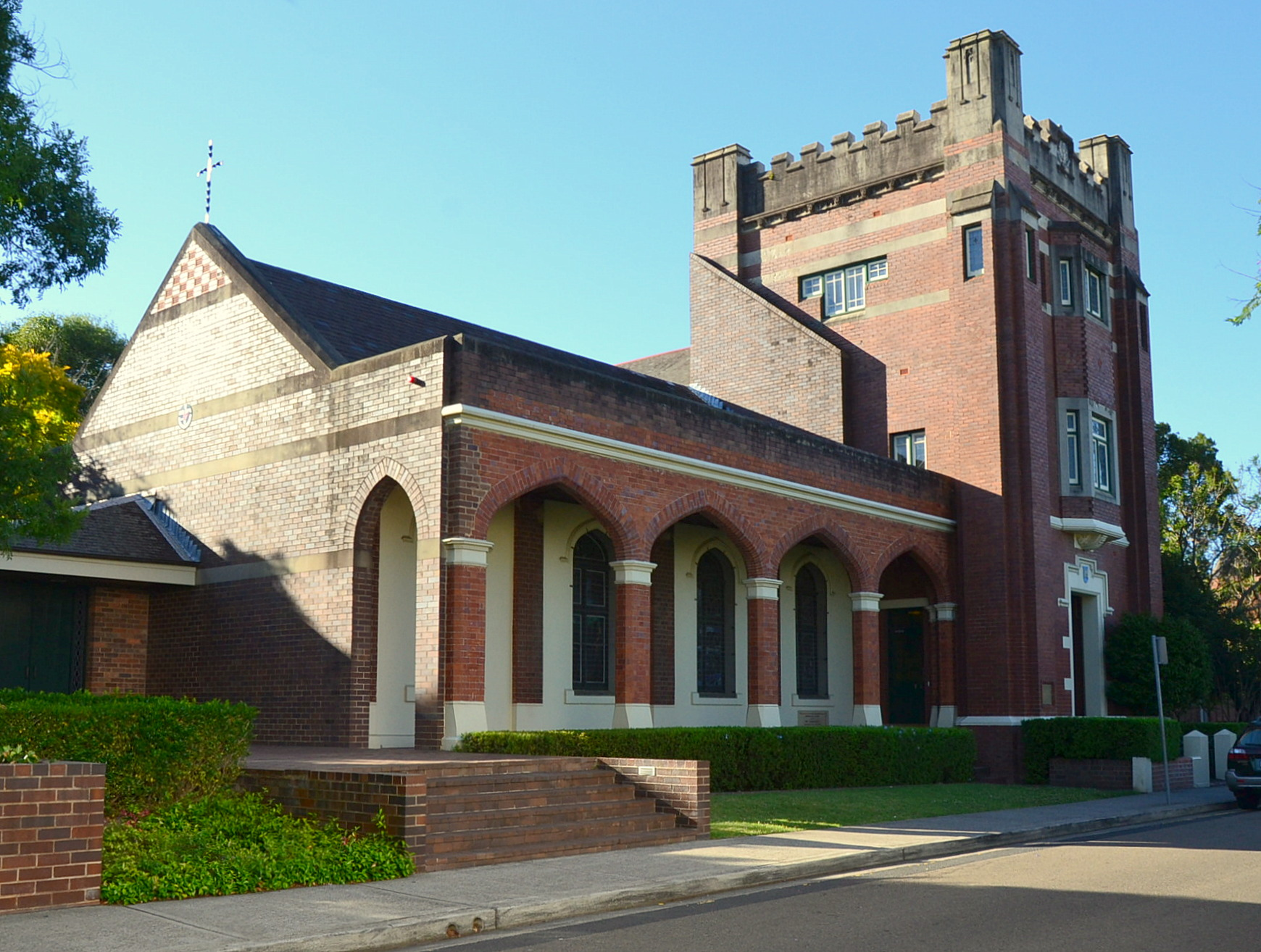
- Schofield Hall and the Tower Wing. The hall, to the left, was designed by Harry Kent and the memorial stone was laid by Mrs Schofield on 16 November 1891. The tower, to the right, was designed by Alfred Newman

Location
- Rowley Street; Burwood, New South Wales, 2134; Australia; 33°52′14″S 151°6′5″E

Information
- Former names: Wesleyan Ladies’ College; Burwood Ladies’ College; Methodist Ladies' College
- Type: Independent single-sex early learning, primary, and secondary day school
- Motto: Latin: Ut filiae lucis ambulate (Walk as daughters of the light)
- Denomination: Uniting Church
- Established: 1886; 140 years ago (as Wesleyan Ladies’ College)
- Educational authority: New South Wales Education Standards Authority
- Chairman: Pauline Johnson
- Principal: Lisa Moloney
- Chaplain: Vanessa Williams-Henke and Viniana Ravatali
- Staff: 167 (2025)
- Years: Early learning and K–12
- Gender: Girls
- Enrolment: 1393 (2025)
- Colours: Blue and light blue
- Website: www.mlcsyd.nsw.edu.au

MLC School (previously Methodist Ladies' College) is an independent Uniting Church single-sex early learning, primary, and secondary day school for girls, located in the Inner West Sydney suburb of Burwood, Australia. The school enrols students from early learning, through kindergarten to year 12.

== History ==
MLC School was founded in 1886 to prepare students for entrance to the University of Sydney, which had only admitted women to degrees four years before. With the view that much more could be expected of girls’ skills and talents during their school education, MLC School was one of the first schools in Australia to offer girls the same level of education as boys.

In 1889, a kindergarten was introduced, placing MLC School in the forefront of educational practice. Founding principal Charles John Prescott believed in the education of very young children and persuaded the college council to establish a co-educational kindergarten. It is believed that MLC School was one of the first to establish a purpose-built kindergarten building. In 1890, Miss Scheer became the MLC School kindergarten teacher. Scheer had received her training in Germany in the methods developed by Friedrich Fröbel. Miss Scheer, and her training under in the principles of Friedrich Fröbel are mentioned in the school history Walk In The Light but unfortunately her Christian name is not recorded.

MLC School has a long tradition in science education. The school's first science laboratory was built in 1924 and chemistry and physics were promptly added to the curriculum. MLC School became the first school in the state to present girls for the Leaving Certificate in physics.

MLC School was also a boarding school until 1977, when a fire destroyed the sleeping dormitories, dining room, offices and some classrooms. When assessed, it was decided that a significant portion of the affected buildings would have to be demolished. Due to falling demand for boarding accommodation, the school council decided not to rebuild the boarding quarters and to phase out the boarding school, which closed at the end of 1979.

In June 1977, when the Methodist Church was incorporated into the new union of the Methodist, Presbyterian and Congregational Churches, the Methodist Ladies College Burwood became known officially as MLC School. Today, MLC School is a day school that forms part of the Uniting Church of Australia.

=== Name changes ===
- 1886 – Wesleyan Ladies' College (opens on 27 January 1886)
- 1899 – Burwood Ladies' College
- 1914 – Methodist Ladies' College
- 1977 – MLC School

=== School crest, colours and motto ===
In 1886, founding principal Prescott and MLC School's drawing and painting teacher Miss Douglas designed the MLC School crest. The crest depicts the book of learning and the star of knowledge on the cross of Saint George.

The MLC School motto, chosen by Prescott, is from the Vulgate: Ut filiae lucis ambulate ('walk as daughters of the light').

Prescott also chose the MLC School colours to honour his alma mater Oxford and its rival institution Cambridge: two bands of dark blue (for love of Oxford) with light blue inserted (for love of Cambridge).

=== School song ===
The MLC School song is Here In This House with music written by Australian composer Lindley Evans who was a visiting music teacher at MLC School from 1930 until 1946 and lyrics written by English poet laureate John Masefield.

=== Recent developments ===
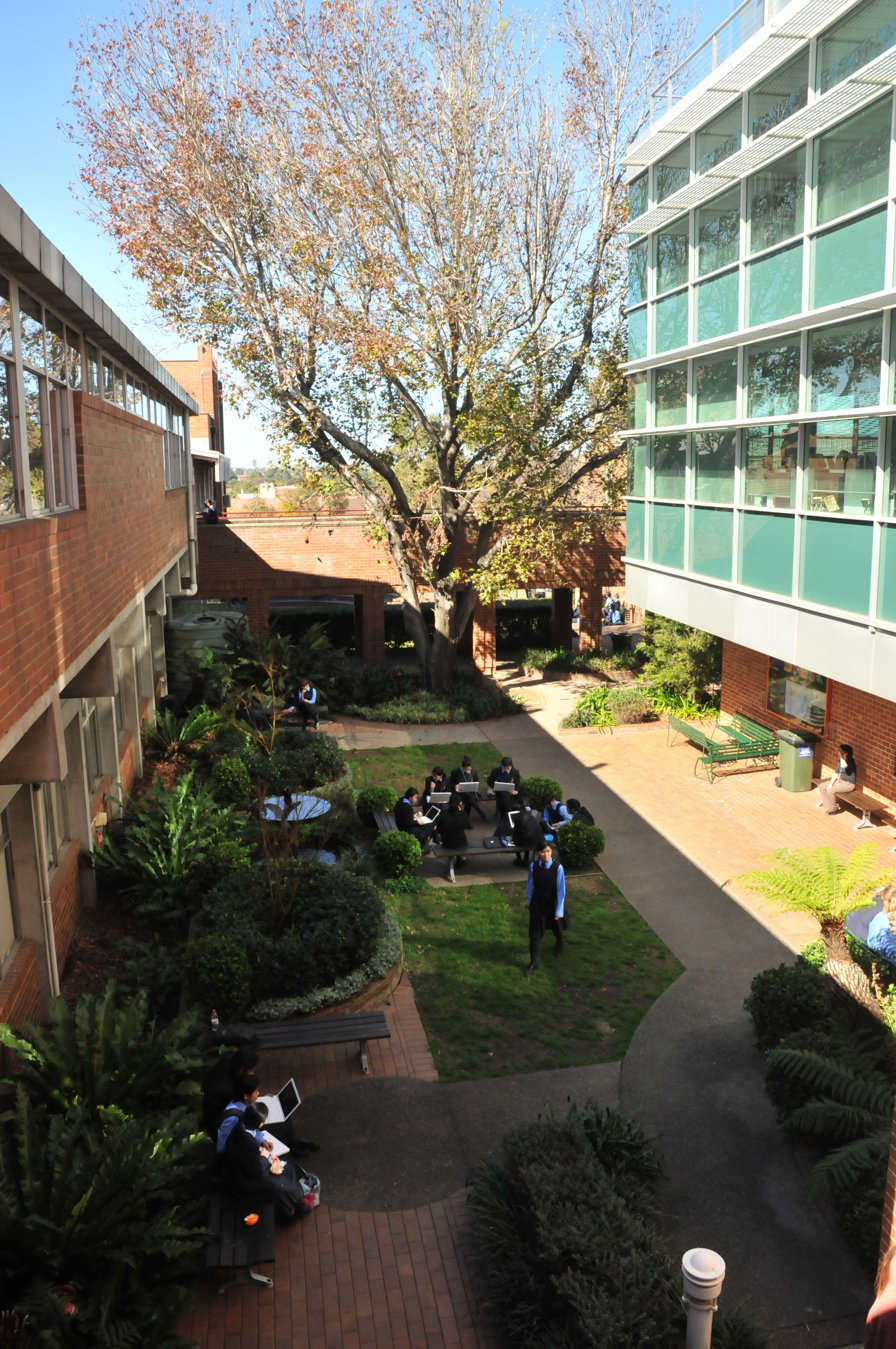
A new quadrangle at MLC School

A number of recent facilities at the school have been designed and constructed by architects Ed Lippmann and Associates, starting with the MLC School Aquatic Centre, which was opened by Dawn Fraser in 2003. The Junior School was completed and opened in 2009 by the Governor-General of Australia Quentin Bryce. The facilities available in the junior school include flexible learning spaces, learning studios, small group areas, wet areas, a literature and resource hub, outdoor learning and play spaces, the piazza, the kiss and drop, and the welcome wall.

MLC Burwood, particularly the main school site bounded by Rowley and Grantham Street and Park Road, is listed on the local government heritage register.

== Principals ==
From 1886 to 1972, MLC School operated under a dual control system with the principal connecting the school to the church and performing religious instruction, and the headmistress administering the day-to-day running, general education and discipline. In 1972 the system changed to single control with the Principal overseeing all the leadership duties. MLC School's principal is Lisa Moloney.

	Principal		Headmistress
1886–1899	Charles John Prescott	1886–1887	E. Shiels
1900–1914	E.J. Rodd	1887–1909	M.F. Wearne
1915–1922	L.H.Kelynack	1909–1912	Jessie Isabel Hetherington
1922–1933	T. Frederick Potts	1912–1940	Miss M.H. Sutton
1933–1939	H.C. Foreman	1941–1959	Gladys Wade
1940–1947	W. Deane	1960–1972	Alice Whitley
1948–1959	R.B Lew		
1960–1964	Winston D'Arcy O'Reilly		
1965–1969	E.A. Bennett		
1973–1989	Kenneth Cornwell		
1990–2011	Barbara Stone		
2011–2016	Denice Scala		
2016–2017	Louise Robert-Smith		
2018–present	Lisa Moloney		

== Curriculum ==
MLC School is registered accredited with the New South Wales Education Standards Authority and therefore follows the mandated curriculum for all years. In Year 11 and 12, students can choose to follow either the Higher School Certificate (HSC) or the International Baccalaureate (IB) curriculum.

=== Higher School Certificate ===
In 2024, the median ATAR for the HSC cohort was 82.15. In 2025, the school ranked 58th in the Higher School Certificate.

=== International Baccalaureate (IB) ===
MLC became an IB World School in August 1999 and offers the International Baccalaureate (IB) to all students in Years 11 and 12 as an alternative to the HSC.

Offered since 2002, it was chosen by nearly 40% of MLC School's graduates in 2022. In 2022, it ranked as the number one IB school in Australia and in the top 50 globally, with 67 students achieving an IB Diploma score of 45/45 since it was introduced. In 2024, the median ATAR equivalent for the IB cohort was 91.75.

== Co-curriculum ==
=== Sport ===
Primary school students may partake in competitive sport through MLC School's membership of the Junior School Heads Association of Australia (JSHAA). These competitions are usually held on Saturday mornings and include sports such as: tee-ball/softball, tennis, netball, cricket, minkey/hockey and soccer.

Secondary school students compete against 28 other similar type schools in the Independent Girls' Schools Sporting Association (IGSSA) competition. These competitions occur on Saturday mornings or in the form of carnivals and include sports such as: netball, softball, swimming, diving, cricket, tennis, athletics, fencing, cross country, rowing, hockey, soccer, water polo, basketball, touch football and gymnastics.

Students who perform well at JSHAA or IGSSA level may be invited to compete in NSW Combined Independent Schools' (CIS) competitions.

From its inception, MLC School has valued academic and co-curricular achievements equally. MLC School was the first school to give girls equal access to sports when on 3 November 1906 the first Athletics Sports Carnival for girls in Australia was held at MLC School. “At first other schools seemed to wonder if it was quite the correct thing, but next year some of them followed suit, and eventually all who had held up hands of horror, put them down and joined in too.”

=== Music ===
MLC School offers instrumental music lessons in over twenty instruments to both current MLC students and external students. Lessons are conducted by professional musicians. Students interested in music are offered the opportunity to perform on a number of levels, including at studio concerts and smaller groups. Performance opportunities are available every year in the Sydney Town Hall and biennially at the Sydney Opera House.

From the beginning, music has held a special status at MLC School. The school's founding principal Prescott wanted his students to achieve tangible recognition for their achievements through examinations in music theory. MLC School was integral in the establishment of the Trinity College (London) musical theory examinations in Australia – the first board to examine candidates in music in Australia. The first MLC School Trinity College results are noted in the School's Examination Results in 1887, just one year after the School was established.

== House system ==
MLC School's senior school has ten houses. Four were created in 1942, and the other six were added in 1992.

MLC School's primary school still utilises the original four houses.

Each House has a staff Head of House and House Tutors. Spirited inter-House competition takes place every year as Houses vie for honours in debating, chess, literature, athletics, cross-country racing and swimming to take out the Spirit and Points Trophies on Speech Night at the end of the year.

=== Original house names (1942) ===
The first four houses were established by Headmistress Dr Gladys Wade in 1942. The House names were chosen from Aboriginal words commencing with the letters MLCB to fit the first letters of Methodist Ladies’ College Burwood, and their emblems were drawn from the MLC School Crest.

Mooramoora means "good spirit", its emblem is the book and its colour is light green (emerald) representing initiative.
Churunga means "sacred place or thing", its emblem is the cross and its colour is yellow (gold) representing worship.
Leawarra means "uprising", its emblem is the shield and its colour is purple (violet) representing conviction.
Booralee means "an ideal to which we must aspire", its emblem is the star and its colour is red (scarlet) representing chivalry.

These house colours, when combined with the indigo and light blue of the school colours, create white light, which echoes the school motto: "Walk as daughters of the light".

=== Six additional houses (1992) ===
In MLC School's 1986 centenary history Walk in the Light, G. Wade (in 1942) described the aims of the original house system as: “giving students interests wider than those of their own class or age group and creating a greater feeling of belonging to the school as a whole. It also allowed more students to become involved in organising and decision making... The system would permeate almost every aspect of school life, providing a basis for friendly, but nevertheless intense competition”.

As the school population grew, Wade's vision began to erode as each of the four Houses grew to over 200 students. At this level, the house system had little meaning other than as a convenient way of dividing the school for sporting and debating competitions.

In 1992, the addition of six new houses was an attempt to restore the system to its original intent. Expanding the house system strengthened the pastoral care program, and provided students with more leadership opportunities and greater encouragement for participation in the wider life of the school.

With ten houses, each student was able to operate within a unit of about eighty students and participation becomes a necessity rather than an option. The impact of this was immediately evident with greater involvement in swimming, sports and gymnastics competitions held during Term 4 1992.

=== New house names (1992) ===
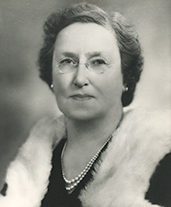
Mabel Sutton, 1940

The six new houses introduced in 1992 were named after people and places of significance in the history of MLC School.

- Abbeythorpe was a two-storey Italianate building located across Park Road from the school, between the sports field and Burwood Park (where the 2003 Aquatic Centre now sits), where classes were held and early boarders were housed for almost 50 years from 1923 when it was purchased by the College Council. Abbeythorpe was demolished in 1972, and in 1978 the Gymnasium (still located within the Aquatic Centre) was built on the site. The colour for Abbeythorpe is dark green.
- Lester is named after Sarah Eliza Lester, who ran one of the earliest private colleges for girls. In 1879, she established a ladies college (her fifth) in the 1855-built "Kent House" on the corner of Park Road and Rowley Street, Burwood. This became the Wesleyan Ladies' College in 1886 and would later become Burwood Ladies' College in 1899, Methodist Ladies' College in 1914, and MLC School in 1977. The colour of Lester House is orange.
- Prescott is named after the founder and first principal-headmaster of the Wesleyan Ladies’ College, Charles Prescott.

In the seven weeks from the time, he was offered the position of Headmaster, Prescott had almost single-handedly organised the school into existence, and he stayed for 14 years, during which the school gained a reputation for sound academic teaching and fine examination records in both academia and music. He left to become the headmaster of Newington College at the end of 1899. The colour of Prescott is royal blue.

- Sutton is named after Mabel Sutton, an MLC School Old Girl (cohort approx. 1896) joined the staff of Burwood Ladies' College as first assistant in 1910 and was appointed headmistress in 1912. In 28 years, she left her mark on education both at the school and in the community. She retired in 1940. In the 1920s, she was instrumental in introducing Physics to the MLC School curriculum, thus making MLC School the first school in NSW to have girls sit the Leaving Certificate Physics exams. The colour for Sutton is pink.
- Wade is named after Gladys Irene Wade, headmistress of MLC School from 1941 until 1959. Earlier in her academic and teaching career, she had been a form mistress at MLC School (1918–24). Wade instigated many of the traditions of the school, such as the house system and the school community service. The colour for Wade is turquoise (blue-green).
- Whitley is named after Alice Whitley, MLC School's last headmistress from 1960 to 1972. A former student of MLC School (Dux in 1930), Whitley made a lasting contribution to science education across NSW. Altogether, she devoted over 50 years of her life to the school. The colour for Whitley is maroon.

== Notable alumnae ==
=== Academia ===
- Elizabeth New OAM – chemist and professor at University of New South Wales
- Ros Pesman AM FAHA – historian, first female Challis Professor at the University of Sydney
- Sylvia Walton AO – principal of Tintern Grammar (1982–2005), chancellor of La Trobe University (2006–2011) and principal of St Catherine's School (2007–2013)
- Alice Whitley MBE – chemist and chemistry teacher

=== Entertainment, media and the arts ===
- Angela Catterns AM – media personality and broadcaster
- Olive Cotton – modernist photographer
- Grace Crowley AM – modernist painter
- Hazel de Berg MBE – oral history pioneer
- Renée Geyer – singer, jazz, soul and R&B musician
- Helen Joyce Haenke – poet and playwright
- Emma Jones – award-winning poet
- Vimala Raman – actress
- Lulu Shorter – designer
- Nikki Webster – singer

=== Medicine and science ===
- Phyllis Margery Anderson – pathologist
- Liz Dennis AC – molecular biologist
- Freida Ruth Heighway – gynaecologist
- Marguerite Henry – zoologist
- Susie O'Reilly – pioneering female doctor
- Joyce Winifred Vickery MBE – forensic botanist
- Pamela Anne Wills – research biologist and radiology scientist

=== Politics and the law ===
- Natalie Bennett – Leader of the Green Party of England and Wales (2012–2016)
- Elizabeth Grace OAM – Federal Member for Division of Lilley (1996–1998)
- Megan Latham – Judge of the Supreme Court of New South Wales (2005–), Commissioner of ICAC (2014–2016)
- Sonia McMahon – socialite and philanthropist, wife of Sir William McMahon
- Olive Nelson – first Pacific Islander to receive a law degree from University of Auckland
- Marise Payne – Liberal Senator for New South Wales (1997–2023) and former Minister for Foreign Affairs (2018–2022)
- Mahla Pearlman AO – Chief Judge of the Land and Environment Court of New South Wales (1992–2003)
- Annie Wyatt OBE – conservationist, helped establish the National Trust of Australia

=== Sport ===
- Jan Andrew – Olympic swimmer (1960)
- Jessica Ashwood – Olympic swimmer (2016) and Commonwealth Games swimmer (2018)
- Vanessa Baker – Commonwealth and Olympic Games diver
- Elisa Barnard – Olympic archer (2012)
- Joan Beck BEM – fencing instructor and archaeologist
- Penelope Blackmore – Olympic rhythmic gymnast (2004)
- Lorraine Crapp – Olympic diver and swimmer (1956 and 1960) and Commonwealth Games swimmer (1954 and 1958)
- Gillian Foster – Olympic soccer player (2004)
- Felicity Galvez – Olympic swimmer (2004 and 2008)
- Keesja Gofers – Olympic water polo player (2024)
- Taniele Gofers – Olympic water polo player (2008)
- Alyssa Healy – captain of the Australia women's national cricket team
- Elizabeth Kell – Olympic rower (2008)
- Desiree Miller – rugby union player for Waratahs and Wallaroos player
- Amie Thompson – Olympic synchronised swimmer (2016 and 2018)

== See also ==
- List of non-government schools in New South Wales
