= Liz Dennis =

Australian scientist

Elizabeth Dennis AC
- Born: 10 December 1943 (age 82); Sydney, Australia
- Education: MLC School; University of Sydney
- Awards: Prime Minister's Prize for Science (2000)
- Scientific career
- Fields: Plant molecular biology
- Institutions: Albert Einstein College of Medicine, New York; University of Papua New Guinea; Australian National University; CSIRO

Elizabeth Salisbury Dennis AC FTSE FAA (born 10 December 1943) is an Australian scientist working mainly in the area of plant molecular biology. She is currently a chief scientist at the plant division of CSIRO Canberra. She was elected a Fellow of the Australian Academy of Technological Sciences and Engineering (FTSE) in 1987, and the Australian Academy of Science in 1995. She jointly received the inaugural Prime Minister's Science Prize together with Professor Jim Peacock in 2000 for her outstanding achievements in science and technology.

== Personal background ==
=== Early years and education ===
Elizabeth Salisbury Dennis, known as Liz Dennis, was born in Sydney, New South Wales, Australia, on 10 December 1943. In her school years at MLC School in Sydney she was inspired by the life of Marie Curie and decided to become a scientist. She completed a Bachelor of Science in chemistry and biochemistry at the University of Sydney (1964), and focused on DNA replication in bacteria during her Ph.D entitled "Studies on the Bacillus subtilis genome" (awarded in 1968).

=== Career posts ===
Dennis went on to study the replication of the yeast mitochondrial DNA during her post-doctoral years in the laboratory of Dr Julius Marmur in New-York (1968–1970).

She then spent four years in Papua New Guinea where she became a lecturer in Microbiology and Biochemistry (1970–1972) and Senior Lecturer in Biochemistry (1974–1976). At this time, she was studying chromosomes and DNA of native rodents, and wrote a guide on the rodents of Papua New Guinea together with Jim Menzies, the zoologist she worked with. In 1972, she was appointed as a Research Scientist at the CSIRO Division of Plant Industry in Canberra, promoted to the grade of Chief Research Scientist in 1991 and subsequently became CSIRO Fellow in 2001.

Meanwhile, she had the chance to visit the Biochemistry Department of Stanford University thanks to a Fulbright Fellowship and worked in the laboratory of the Nobel Prize winner Paul Berg (1982–83). She also visited Australian National University in 1991 and became Adjunct Professor there between 1992 and 1998.

== Research ==
With a strong interest in plant gene expression and regulation, Dennis studied plant development using molecular approaches and was involved in mapping plant genomes.

=== Plant response to hypoxia ===
Her early work in the plant field was dedicated to the molecular responses of plants to hypoxia and waterlogging, i.e. which genes are switched on by low oxygen levels. She, together with her collaborators, cloned the gene encoding the enzyme alcohol dehydrogenase and identified the regulatory motifs controlling its expression in response to the lack of oxygen. She also was involved in the research showing that all plants contain haemoglobin and that this molecule protects the plant against oxygen deprivation stress

=== Plant flowering ===
Understanding how flowering is regulated in plants is another research area she successfully tackled. Her team worked on genes that represses flowering (FLC and FLF, FLOWERING LOCUS C and FLOWERING LOCUS F) and showed that their effect is down-regulated by vernalisation. They also observed that a reduction in DNA methylation plays an important role in this response to cold. The mechanism involves histone de-acetylation at FLC and methylation of FLC in vernalised plants, both reactions performed by a single protein complex.

=== Molecular bases of heterosis ===
Her more recent work is dedicated to understanding the phenomenon of heterosis or hybrid vigour, i.e. the increased biomass of hybrids as compared with their parents. Factors involved in this regulation are small RNA molecules (sRNA), DNA methylation and histone modification.

== Honours ==
- Senior Scholar Fulbright Fellowship, 1982
- Fellow of Australian Academy of Technological Sciences and Engineering, 1987
- Pharmacia LKB/Biotechnology Medal of the Australian Biochemical Society, 1988
- Fellow of Australian Academy of Science, 1995
- Avon Spirit of Achievement Award, 1997
- Lemberg Medal of the Australian Society of Biochemistry and Molecular Biology, 1998
- Prime Minister's Science Prize, 2000
- Fellow of the American Society for the Advancement of Science, 2002
- Farrer Memorial Trust Medal, 2014
- Companion of the Order of Australia, 2019
- Member of National Academy of Sciences, 2021
- Ruby Payne-Scott Medal and Lecture awarded by the Australian Academy of Science, 2022

=== Past ===
- Chairman of the Multinational Arabidopsis Genome Project
- President of the Australian Society of Biochemistry and Molecular Biology (1992–94)
- Director of the International Society of Plant Molecular Biology from 1990–93
