= Ebenezer Vickery =

Australian politician

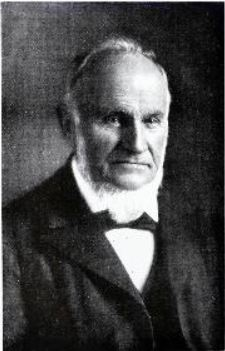
- Born: 1 March 1827
- Died: 20 December 1906 (aged 79)
- Occupation: Businessman

Ebenezer Vickery (1 March 1827 – 20 August 1906) was an Australian businessman, pastoralist and philanthropist.

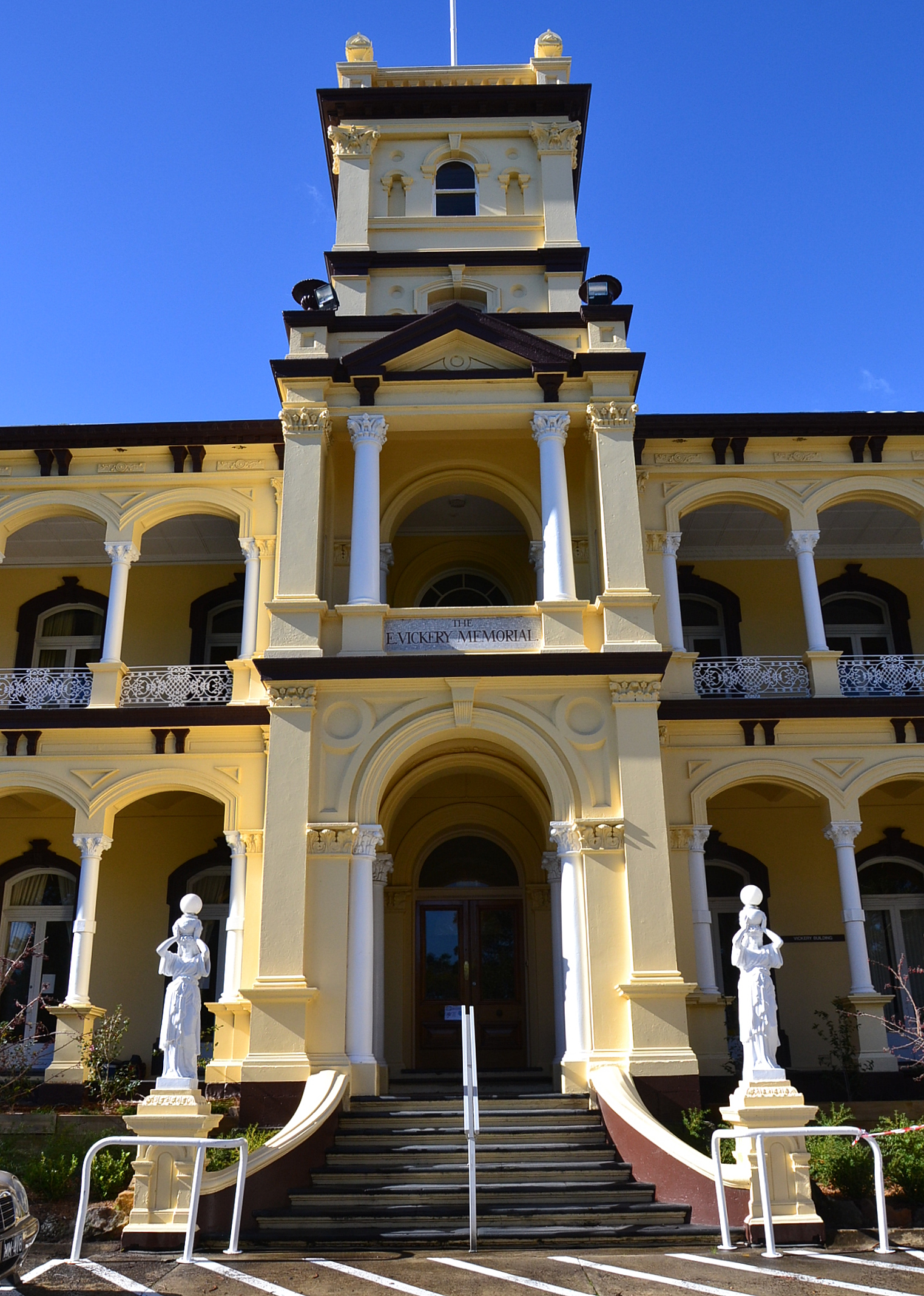
Edina, Vickery's home in Waverley, Sydney

== Early life ==
Ebenezer was born in London and arrived in Sydney with his parents and siblings aboard the Richard Reynolds in 1833. He was educated at W. T. Cape's Sydney College, and left school at age 16 to become apprenticed to T. Bowden, ironmonger. In 1849 he joined the mercantile firm of Richard Fawcett. His father concentrated on squatting in 1851 and Ebenezer took over the boot factory in George Street. He married Jane Begg in 1851.

== Business dealings ==
In 1860 Vickery moved to larger premises in Pitt Street, adding general trading and importing. He became chairman of the Fitzroy Ironworks Co. in 1864 and though he reorganised the company financially, it failed for other reasons: this was Vickery's only business setback. Fitzroy iron was used the same year in the construction of his new chambers in Pitt Street, the first building in the colony to use structural iron. Next year his Sydney factory, associated with J. E. Begg's Glenmore tannery, employed twenty-five persons on the premises and about seventy-five outworkers.

He visited England in 1866 and became interested in the shipping trade; he had the Parramatta built there and became part-owner of the several other ships. He was executive commissioner for Fiji at the 1879 Sydney International Exhibition.

Vickery gradually built up a vast empire by hard work and sound business acumen. He acquired an interest in seven coal-mines; he owned two colliers and a colliery at Mount Keira, was chairman of the South Greta Coal Co. and of the Mount Kembla Coal and Oil Co., and in 1896 took over the Coal Ciff Coal Co. from the estate of Sir Alexander Stuart. He was one of the largest station-owners and property speculators in the colony: among the runs he held was Munyer near Moree, which in 1884 covered 170,000 acres (68,797 ha) (68,797 ha) and carried 2800 cattle and 9600 sheep. He had much real estate in Sydney, including the suburb of Waverley, and was a director of the City Bank of Sydney, the Pacific Fire and Marine Insurance Co., the Perpetual Trustee Co. and the Mutual Assurance Society of Victoria. He also was a member of the general committee of the New South Wales Free Trade Association and chairman of the New South Wales Trade Protection Society. In 1881 he took his sons Ebenezer and Joseph into partnership and in 1902 his entire business was incorporated as a public company under the style of E. Vickery and Sons Ltd; it became a proprietary company in May 1937.

== Political career ==
Vickery's political career began in 1863, when he was elected to councillor of the Waverely municipality to represent the ward of Bondi. Later appointed to the Legislative Council of New South Wales in 1887, he confined his speeches to social and mining matters. He opposed the cremation bill but supported Sir Alfred Stephen's radical divorce bill in April; speaking on the coal-mines regulation bill in October 1894 he strongly defended capitalism, attacked 'union leaders and socialistic agitators' and opposed the eight-hour clause and the proposed minimum age of 14 for boys in mines.

== Religion and philanthropy ==
A staunch Methodist, Vickery made lavish donations to the Church. In 1901–02 he spent £10,000 on tent missions throughout New South Wales. He bought the Lyceum Theatre in Pitt Street in 1905, spent £27,000 on alterations and gave it to the Church: it was opened in September 1908 as 'The Vickery Mission Settlement'. A founder and honorary treasurer of the Sydney Young Men's Christian Association (YMCA), he also gave money and help to the Young Women's Christian Association (YWCA) and was a benefactor to Sydney public charitable institutions. Self made and self-contained, Vickery cared little about society or culture: his business, his family, his Church and his philanthropic work were his absorbing interests.

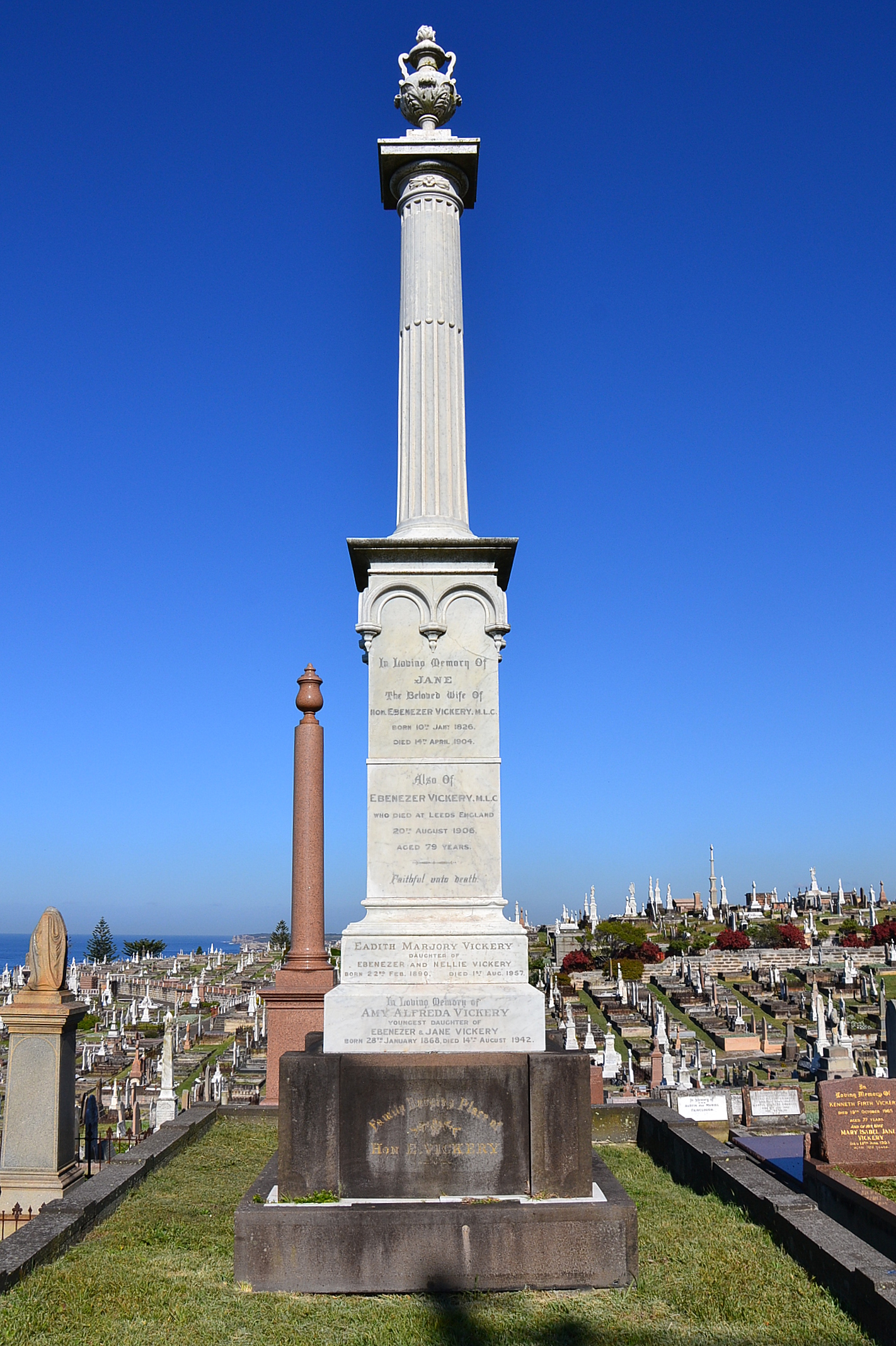
Vickery family grave, Waverley Cemetery, Sydney

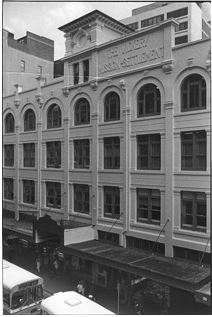
The Vickery Mission Settlement

== Later life ==
In 1905 at Camden Park, Menangle, Vickery married Deborah Ellis. They visited the United States of America and England for him to study modern evangelistic methods. He survived the great 1906 San Francisco earthquake in California, but died after an operation at Leeds, England, on 20 August 1906. He was buried in Waverley Cemetery, Sydney, not far from his fine residence, Edina, now part of the War Memorial Hospital in Birrell Street, Waverley. The residence was sold by his wife to the Church and opened as a hospital in February 1921. His estate was sworn for probate at £483,354, of which £11,000 was willed mainly to Methodist charities.

== Bibliography ==
- Morrison, W Frederic (1888). The Aldine Centennial History of New South Wales (PDF). Vol. 2. Sydney: Aldine Publishing Co. pp. 759–760.
- Digby, Everard, ed. (1889). Australian men of mark (PDF). Vol. 2. Sydney: Charles F Maxwell. p. 444.
- Taylor, William George (1920). The Life-Story of an Australian Evangelist. London: Epworth Press.
- Votes and Proceedings (Legislative Assembly, New South Wales), 1883–84, 11, 223
- The Sydney Mail, 1 April 1865
- 'Obituary', Times (London), 24 August 1906, p 3
- J. Colwell, The Passing of a Great Philanthropist (State Library of New South Wales)
- Michael Vickery, personal papers
