= List of fellows of the Australian Academy of Technological Sciences and Engineering =

There are almost 900 living fellows of the Australian Academy of Technology and Engineering. The post-nominal is FTSE.

The following lists many notable living and deceased Fellows.

Title	Name	Post-nominals	Division	Elected	Notes
Distinguished Professor	Fang Chen	FTSE		2026	
Professor	Mahananda Dasgupta	FTSE	ACT	2026	
	Tanya de Hoog	FTSE		2026	
Professor	Fariba Dehghani	FTSE	NSW	2026	
Professor	Amanda Ellis	FTSE	Victoria	2026	
Professor	Lan Fu	FTSE	ACT	2026	
	Kay Blades	FTSE		2026	
Professor	Chunxia Zhao	FTSE		2026	
	Liz Westcott	FTSE		2026	
Professor	Kate Smith-Miles	AO FTSE FAA		2026	
Professor	Flora Salim	FTSE		2026	
	Katherine Richards	AM FTSE CSC		2025	
Dr	Elisa Mokany	FTSE		2026	
Professor	Graciela Metternicht	FTSE	NSW	2026	
Dr	Melita Keywood	FTSE		2025	
Hon. Dr	Parwinder Kaur	FTSE		2026	
Professor	Rebecca Gravina	FTSE		2026	
	Katherine Bennell-Pegg	FTSE		2025	
Professor	Eva Bezak	FTSE		2025	
	Kerryn Coker	FTSE		2025	
Dr	Nick Flemming	FTSE		2025	
The honorable	Peter Garrett	FTSE		2025	
Dr	Victoria Gordon	FTSE		2025	
	Yuming Guo	FTSE		2025	
Professor	Susan Harrison	FTSE		2025	
Professor	Kourosh Kalantar-Zadeh	FTSE		2025	
Professor	Michael Kassiou	FTSE		2025	
	Neil Kavanagh	FTSE		2025	
Professor	Christina Lim	FTSE		2025	
	Sarah McSwiney	FTSE		2025	
Professor	Bradley Moggridge	FTSE		2025	
Distinguished Professor	Lidia Morawska	FTSE		2025	
	Pamela Naidoo-Ameglio	FTSE		2025	
Professor	Shi-Zhang Qiao	FTSE		2025	
Professor	Peng Shi	FTSE		2025	
Professor	Cori Stewart	FTSE		2025	
Professor	Kimberley Swords			2025	
Professor	Ying Tan	FTSE		2025	
	Suzanne Thompson	FTSE		2025	
Distinguished Professor	Guoxiu Wang	FTSE		2025	
Professor	Hongxia Wang	FTSE		2025	
	Kathryn West	FTSE		2025	
Professor	Juliet Willetts	FTSE		2025	
Professor	Sally Benson	FTSE		2024	
	Fiona Simson	FTSE		2024	
Professor	Yan Zhuge	FTSE		2024	
Professor	Chuan Zhao	FTSE		2024	
Professor	Yixia (Sarah) Zhang	FTSE		2024	
Professor	Xiwang Zhang	FTSE		2024	
Dr	Zongli Xie	FTSE		2024	
Professor	Lianzhou Wang	FTSE FAA		2024	
Professor	Toby Walsh	FTSE FAA		2024	
Professor	Karin Verspoor	FTSE		2024	
Dr	James Tickner	FTSE		2024	
	Guy Templeton	FTSE FAICD		2024	
Professor	Paul Simshauser	FTSE AO		2024	
Professor	Craig Rayner	FTSE		2024	
	Anne O'Neill	FTSE		2024	
Professor	David Moss	FTSE		2024	
Professor	Michelle Leishman	FTSE		2024	
Dr	Fiona Kerr	FTSE		2024	
Professor	Misty Jenkins	FTSE AO		2024	
	Gabriel Iwanow	FTSE		2024	
Dr	Michelle Heupel	FTSE		2024	
Professor	Clinton Fookes	FTSE		2024	
Rear Admiral	Rachel Durbin	FTSE CSC RAN		2024	
	Rachelle Doyle	FTSE		2024	
	Karen Dobson	FTSE		2024	
Dr	Iris Depaz	FTSE		2024	
Professor	Liming Dai	FTSE FAA		2024	
Professor	Frank Caruso	FTSE FRS FAA		2024	
Dr	Josep (Pep) Canadell	FTSE		2024	
Professor	Alex Brown	FTSE FAHMS		2024	
	Anne-Marie Birkill	FTSE		2024	
Dr	Angeline Achariya	FTSE		2024	
Dr	Jane MacMaster	FTSE		2023	
Dr	Susanne Hermesch	FTSE		2023	
Dr	Anna Giacomini	FTSE		2023	
Dr	Therese Flapper	FTSE	NSW	2023	
Dr	Susannah Eliott	FTSE		2023	
Professor	Anna Moore	FTSE	ANU	2023	
	Lara Olsen	FTSE	VIC	2023	
Ms	Su McCluskey	FTSE	NSW	2023	
Professor	Chamindie Punyadeera	FTSE	QLD	2023	
Professor	Bronwyn Gillanders	FTSE	SA	2023	
Professor	Sandra Eades	FTSE AO FASSA FAHMS	WA	2023	
	Mikaela Jade	FTSE	ACT	2023	
Professor	Joanna Batstone	FTSE	Vic	2023	
Dr	Sarah Pearce	FTSE	WA	2020	
Professor	Renate Egan	FTSE	NSW	2020	
Professor	David Abramson	FTSE	VIC	2010	
The Hon.	Mike Ahern	AO FTSE	QLD	1997	
	Martin Albrecht	AC FTSE	QLD	2000	
Professor	Rose Amal	FAA FIChemE FTSE	NSW	2012	
Professor	Brian Anderson	AC FRS FAA FTSE	ACT	1980	
The Hon.	John Anderson	AC FTSE	NSW	2019	
The Hon.	Doug Anthony	CH AC FTSE	NSW	1990	Deceased 2020
Dr	Mary Ann Augustin	FTSE		2013	
Dr	Greg Ayers	FTSE	VIC	2006	
Dr	Charles Barnes	FTSE	NSW	1984	Deceased 1998
Professor	Kaye Basford	FTSE	QLD	2006	
The Honourable Dame	Marie Bashir	AD CVO FTSE	NSW	2006	
Professor	Antony Basten	AO FAA FTSE	NSW	1981	
Professor	Robin Batterham	AO FREng FAA FTSE	VIC	1988	
Professor	Lyn Beazley	AO FTSE	WA	2009	
	Gordon Bell	FTSE	CA	2009	
	Tim Besley	AC FTSE	NSW	1985	
Professor	Suresh Bhatia	FTSE	QLD	2010	
Professor	Andrew Blakers	FTSE	ACT	2004	
Dr	Norman Boardman	AO FRS FAA FTSE	ACT	1986	
Dr	David Boger	FRS FAA FTSE	VIC	1989	Deceased 2025
Professor	John Boldeman	AO FTSE	NSW	1993	
Professor	Rod Boswell	AM FAA FTSE	ACT	1999	
Professor	Tony Bradshaw	FTSE	NSW	1977	Deceased 2008
Lord	Alec Broers	FREng FRS FTSE		2002	
Em Professor	Rod Brooks	FTSE	Mass	2006	
Professor	Ted Brown	AC FREng FTSE	QLD	1990	
Em Professor	Keith Bullock	FTSE	QLD	1988	Deceased 2015
Em Professor	Margaret Bullock	AM FTSE	QLD	1991	
Professor	Antony Burgess	FTSE	VIC	2008	
Professor	Edward Byrne	AC FRACP FTSE	VIC	2012	
Sir	Roderick Carnegie	AC FTSE	VIC	1985	
Em Professor	Branko Celler	FIEAust FTSE	NSW	2012	
	Robert Champion de Crespigny	AC FTSE	SA	2001	
Dr	Michael Chaney	AO FTSE	WA	2012	
Dr	Ian Chessell	FTSE	SA	2003	
Professor	Ian Chubb	AC FTSE	ACT	2014	
Professor	Graeme Clark	AC FAA FRS FTSE	VIC	1998	
Dr	Megan Clark	FTSE	ACT	2006	
Professor	Adrienne Clarke	AC FAA FTSE	VIC	1988	
	Drew Clarke	AO PSM FTSE	ACT	2011	
Dr	Helen Cleugh	FTSE	ACT	2019	
Dr	Peter Colman	AC FAA FRS FTSE	VIC	1997	
Em Professor	Bill Compston	FAA FRS FTSE	ACT	1997	
Professor	Peter Corke	FAA FTSE	QLD	2017	
Professor	Edwina Cornish	AO FTSE	VIC	2000	
Sir	Zelman Cowen	AK GCMG GCVO KStJ FTSE			Deceased 2011
Professor	Michael Cowley	FTSE	VIC	2011	
Professor	Peter Darvall	AO FTSE	VIC	1994	
	Di Davidson	AM FTSE	SA	2001	
Professor	David de Kretser	AC FAA FTSE	VIC	2001	
Dr	Liz Dennis	FAA FTSE	ACT	1987	
Dr	Dimity Dornan	AO FTSE	QLD	2016	
Professor	Peter Dowd	FREng FRSA FTSE	SA	2006	
Professor	Hugh Durrant-Whyte	FRS FAA FTSE	NSW	2002	
Sir	Rod Eddington	AO FTSE	VIC	2012	
Professor	Ben Eggleton	FAA FTSE	NSW	2009	
Dr	Bronwyn Evans	AM FTSE	NSW	2012	
Professor	Lindsay Falvey	FTSE FAIAST	VIC	1997	
Professor	Lorenzo Faraone	AM FAA FTSE	WA	2004	
Dr	Keith Farrer	OBE FRSA FRACI FTSE	VIC	1976	Foundation Fellow; Deceased 2012
	John Faulkner	FTSE			
Dr	Kenneth Adie Ferguson	FTSE			Deceased 2011
Dr	Alan Finkel	AM FTSE	VIC	2006	
The Hon.	Tim Fischer	AC FTSE	VIC	2000	Deceased 2019
	Trevor Flugge	AO FTSE	WA	2002	
Dr	Cathy Foley	FTSE	NSW	2008	
Professor	Ian Frazer	AC FAA FTSE	QLD	2003	
Dr	Geoff Garrett	AO FTSE	QLD	2003	
Professor	Barney Glover	FTSE	NSW	2016	
Professor	Ashley Goldsworthy	AO OBE FTSE	QLD	1994	
	Denise Goldsworthy	AO FTSE	WA	2013	
Professor	Graham Goodwin	FRS FAA FTSE	NSW	1987	
Dr	Ian Gould	AM FTSE	SA	2007	
General	Peter Gration	AC OBE FTSE	NSW	1988	
Professor	Martin Green	AM FAA FTSE	NSW	1994	
Professor	Paul Greenfield	AO FTSE	QLD	1992	
	John Grill	FTSE	NSW	2007	
Professor	Min Gu	FAA FTSE	VIC	2006	
Dr	Stephen Gumley	AO FTSE	VIC	2007	
Professor	Yingjie Jay Guo	FTSE	NSW	2013	
Professor	Ian Gust	AO FTSE	VIC	1986	
Dr	Vanessa Guthrie	FTSE	WA	2015	
Air Vice Marshal (Rtd)	Julie Hammer	AM CSC FTSE	QLD	2008	
Dr	Bronwyn Harch	FTSE	QLD	2013	
Professor	Milton Hearn	FTSE	VIC	1990	
Professor	Gernot Heiser	FTSE	NSW	2016	
Dr	Paul Heithersay	PSM FTSE	SA	2012	
Professor	Ann Henderson-Sellers	FTSE		2000	
Professor	Basil Hetzel	AC FTSE	SA	1981	Deceased 2017
Dr	Bruce Hobbs	AO FAA FTSE	WA	2006	
Professor	Peter Høj	FTSE	QLD	2004	
Professor	Andrew Holmes	AM FRS FAA FTSE	VIC	2006	
Professor	Stephen Hopper	AC FTSE	WA	2011	
His Excellency General The Hon.	David Hurley	AC DSC FTSE	NSW	2016	Honorary Fellow
Sir	Brian Inglis	AC FTSE	VIC	1983	Deceased 2014
Professor	Chennupati Jagadish	FAA FTSE	ACT	2002	
Professor	Graeme Jameson	AO FAA FREng FTSE	NSW	1991	
Professor	Emma Johnston	AO FTSE	NSW	2019	
The Hon	Barry Jones	AC FAA FASSA FAHA FTSE FACE	VIC	1992	
Professor	Rhondda Jones	FTSE	QLD	1992	
	Alan Joyce	FRAeS FTSE	NSW	2012	
Em Professor	Antoni Karbowiak	FTSE		1976	Foundation Fellow; Deceased 2011
The Hon.	John Kerin	AM FTSE	ACT	2001	
	Malcolm Kinnaird	AC FTSE	SA	1990	Deceased 2014
	David Klingberg	AO FTSE	SA		
	Peter Klinken	AC FAHMS FTSE	WA	2016	
	Marius Kloppers	FTSE	VIC	2012	
	David Knox	FTSE	SA	2012	
Dr	Anna Koltunow	FAA FTSE		2018	
	John Landy	AC MBE FTSE	VIC	2003	Deceased 2022
Professor	Richard Larkins	AO FTSE	VIC	2008	
	John Laurie	AC FTSE	VIC	1994	
Dr	Phillip Law	AC CBE FAA FTSE		1976	Foundation Fellow; Deceased 2010
Professor	Alec Lazenby	AO FTSE	ACT	1976	Foundation Fellow
Professor	Rob Lewis	FTSE	SA	1998	
Professor	Dennis Liotta	FTSE	USA	2014	Foreign Fellow
Dr	Andrew Liveris	FTSE	MI	2008	
Dr	Catherine Livingstone	AO FTSE	NSW	2002	
Professor	David Lloyd	FTSE	SA	2019	
	Brian Loton	AC FTSE	VIC	1980	
Dr	Roger Lough	AM FTSE	VIC	2005	
Professor	John Loughhead	OBE FREng FTSE		2011	
Professor	Ian Lowe	AO FTSE	QLD	2005	
Professor	Max Lu	AO FAA IChemE FTSE	QLD	2002	
Dr.	Rachel Makinson	AM FTSE	NSW	1981	Deceased 2014
Professor	Helene Marsh	FTSE	QLD	2010	
Professor	Raymond Martin	AO FAA FTSE	VIC	1989	Deceased 2020
Professor	Thomas Maschmeyer	FAA FTSE	NSW	2011	
Dr	Ramesh Mashelkar	FRS FTSE		2008	
Professor	John Mattick	AO FAA FAHMS FTSE	NSW	2017	
Dr	Jim May	AM FTSE HonFAusIMM	VIC	1994	Deceased 2023
Lord	Robert May	AC FRS FREng FAA FTSE		2001	Deceased 2020
The Hon.	Karlene Maywald	FTSE	SA	2012	
Professor	Tony McMichael	AO FTSE	ACT	2003	Deceased 2014
Dr	Sue Meek	FTSE	ACT	2005	
Dr	Ken Michael	AC FTSE	WA	1993	
Em Professor	Michael Miller	AO FTSE	SA	1993	
Em Professor	Nancy Millis	AC MBE FAA FTSE			Deceased 2012
Professor	Tanya Monro	FAA FTSE	SA	2009	
	Hugh Morgan	AC FTSE	VIC	1991	
	Henry Muller	FTSE	SA	2000	Deceased 2017
	Chloe Munro	AO FTSE			Deceased 2021
	Sue Murphy	AO FTSE	WA	2009	
Sir	Rupert Myers	KBE AO FAA FTSE	NSW	1979	Deceased 2019
Sir	Eric Neal	AC CVO FTSE	SA	1989	Deceased 2025
Professor	David Nethercot	OBE FTSE		2010	
Sir	Gus Nossal	AC CBE FRS FAA FTSE	VIC	1981	
Professor	Mary O'Kane	AC FTSE	NSW	1994	
Sir	Mark Oliphant	AC KBE FRS FAA FTSE		1976	Foundation Fellow; Deceased 2000
Professor	Robyn Owens	FAA FTSE	WA	2012	
Sir	Arvi Parbo	AC FTSE	VIC	1977	Deceased 2019
Dr	Adi Paterson	FTSE	NSW	2009	
Dr	Jim Peacock	AC FRS FAA FTSE	ACT	1988	
Dr	Graeme Pearman	AM FAA FTSE	VIC	2005	
Professor	Ian Plimer	FTSE			
Dr	Phillip Playford	AM FTSE	WA	1992	Deceased 2017
Professor	Ian Plimer	FTSE	SA	1999	
Professor	Susan Pond	AM FTSE	NSW	1996	
Professor	Ren Potts	AO FAA FTSE FACS FAustMS	SA	1983	Deceased 2005
Professor	Harry Poulos	AM FAA FTSE	NSW	1996	
	John Prescott	AC FTSE	VIC	1995	
Dr	Alessandra Pucci	AO FTSE	NSW	1990	
Dr	Tracie Ramsdale	FTSE	QLD	2011	
Dr	Deborah Rathjen	FTSE	SA	2007	
Professor	Michael Raupach	FTSE	ACT	2002	Deceased 2015
Dr	Leanna Read	FAICD FTSE	SA	1999	
Professor	Karen Reynolds	FTSE	SA	2011	
Professor	Göran Roos	FTSE	SA	2014	
Professor	Veena Sahajwalla	CPEng FTSE	NSW	2007	
Professor	Vicki Sara	AO FAA FTSE	QLD	1998	
Professor	Elaine Saunders	FTSE	VIC	2019	
Sir	Sydney Schubert	FTSE			Deceased 2015
Em Professor	Peter Schwerdtfeger	FTSE			Deceased 2013
Professor	Margaret Sheil	AO FTSE	VIC	2009	
Dr	Zhengrong Shi	FTSE		2009	
Professor	Craig Simmons	FTSE	SA	2014	
Professor	Michelle Simmons	AO FRS FAA FTSE	NSW	2015	
Em Professor	Maria Skyllas-Kazacos	AM FTSE	NSW	2013	
Professor	Ralph Slatyer	AC FRS FAA FTSE		1992	Deceased 2012
Professor	Maree Smith	AC FTSE	QLD	2011	
Dr	Erica Smyth	AC FTSE	WA	2012	
Professor	Allan Snyder	FRS FAA FTSE	NSW	1987	
Professor	David Solomon	AC FRS FAA FIChemE FTSE	VIC	1976	Foundation Fellow
Dr	Jenny Stauber	FAA FTSE	NSW	2015	
Professor	David Strangway	OC FTSE		2003	Deceased 2016
Dr	Ziggy Switkowski	AO FTSE	VIC	2007	
Professor	Greg Tegart	AM FTSE	ACT	1976	Foundation Fellow
Professor	Jan Maree Tennent	FTSE	VIC	2019	
	David Thodey	AO FTSE	VIC	2013	
Professor	Bruce Thom	AM FTSE	NSW	2002	
Dr	Alison Todd	FTSE	NSW	2019	
Professor	Alan Trounson	FTSE	VIC	2014	
Em Professor	Norman McCall Tulloh	AM FTSE	VIC	1981	Deceased 2019
Professor	Svetha Venkatesh	FTSE	VIC	2006	
Sir	James Vernon	AC CBE FTSE		1976	Foundation Fellow; Deceased 2000
Professor	Branka Vucetic	FTSE	NSW	2015	
Em Professor	Mark Wainwright	AM FTSE	NSW	1992	
Professor	Gordon Wallace	AO FAA FTSE	NSW	2003	
Dr	Bob Ward	FTSE		1976	Foundation Fellow; Deceased 2013
Professor	Anthony Weiss	AM FTSE FRSC FRACI FRSN FAICD FBSE	NSW	2014	
Professor	Stuart Wenham	FTSE	NSW	1999	Deceased 2017
Professor	Neil Weste	FTSE	NSW	2006	
Dr	John Williams	FTSE	ACT	2011	
Professor	Mary-Anne Williams	FTSE FAAAI FACS	NSW	2015	
	Skipp Williamson	FTSE	NSW	2017	
Sir	Greg Winter	CBE FRS FTSE		2002	
Dr	Alex Zelinsky	AO FTSE	ACT	2002	
Professor	Liangchi Zhang	FTSE	NSW	2006	
Dr	John Zillman	AO FAA FTSE	VIC	1980	

== Post-nominal statistics ==
		Approx. # held by Fellows	
		Feb 2013	Apr 2018
Australian Honours
AC	Companion of the Order of Australia	30	43
AO	Officer of the Order of Australia	98	124
AM	Member of the Order of Australia	138	135
OAM	Medal of the Order of Australia	10	9
CSC	Conspicuous Service Cross (Australia)	1	1
PSM	Public Service Medal	7	9
Imperial Honours
CH	Companion of Honour	1	1
CVO	Commander of the Royal Victorian Order	2	2
KBE	Knight Commander of the Order of the British Empire	1	1
CBE	Commander of the Order of the British Empire	4	4
OBE	Officer of the Order of the British Empire	10	11
MBE	Member of the Order of the British Empire	2	1
Professional Societies
FAA	Fellow of the Australian Academy of Science	81	88
FREng	Fellow of the Royal Academy of Engineering	12	18
FRS	Fellow of the Royal Society	19	24

Numbers of active/living Fellows in the on-line database

Feb 2013	May 2014	Sep 2017	Apr 2018
825	829	855	876

== See also ==
- National Academies Forum (NAF)
- Australian Academy of Science (AAS) – Fellows of the Australian Academy of Science (FAA)
- Australian Academy of the Humanities (AHA) – Fellows of the Australian Academy of the Humanities (FAHA)
- Academy of the Social Sciences in Australia (ASSA) – Fellows of the Academy of the Social Sciences in Australia (FASSA)
- Australian Academy of Technological Sciences and Engineering (ATSE) – Fellows of the Australian Academy of Technological Sciences and Engineering (FTSE)
- Australian Academy of Health and Medical Sciences (AAHMS) - Fellows of the Australian Academy of Health and Medical Sciences (FAHMS)
