= Christina Lim =

Australian electrical engineer

Christina Lim is an Australian expert on optical wireless communications, radio over fiber, and hybrid "fiber-wireless" networks combining fiber connections to base stations with wireless connections to individual devices. Beyond optical communications, she has also developed transparent displays for augmented reality. She is a professor in the Department of Electrical and Electronic Engineering at the University of Melbourne, where she directs the Photonics and Electronics Research Laboratory.

== Education and career ==
Lim studied electrical and electronic engineering at the University of Melbourne, obtaining a bachelor's degree in 1995 and completing her Ph.D. in 2000. She has been part of the Photonics Research Laboratory since 1999.

She was named as an Australian Research Council (ARC) Australian Research Fellow for 2004–2008, and as an ARC Future Fellow for 2010–2013.

== Recognition ==
Lim was named as an Optica Fellow, in the 2019 class of fellows, "for outstanding and sustained pioneering contributions to the research, development, and applications of fiber-wireless technology in the field of microwave photonics". She was elected as an IEEE Fellow in 2023, "for contributions in hybrid fiber-wireless communications technology". In 2025 she was named as an ATSE Fellow of the Australian Academy of Technological Sciences and Engineering.
