= Anna Koltunow =

Australian plant physiologist

Anna Koltunow FAA FTSE
- Born: Anna Maria Grazyna Koltunow
- Education: Flinders University • University of Adelaide
- Scientific career
- Workplaces: CSIRO • University of Adelaide • La Trobe University • University of Queensland
- Thesis: An investigation of feather keratin gene expression (1986)

Anna M. G. Koltunow is an Australian plant physiologist researching how plants reproduce. As of 2019 she is Professorial Research Fellow in the Centre for Crop Science at the University of Queensland. She is leading research for the second phase of a project funded by the Bill & Melinda Gates Foundation.

Koltunow graduated from Flinders University in 1981 with a BSc(Hons). She was awarded a PhD by the University of Adelaide in 1987.

From 2002 to 2006 Koltunow was president of the International Association of Sexual Plant Reproduction Research. She was elected Fellow of the Australian Academy of Science in May 2016 and of the Australian Academy of Technological Sciences and Engineering in 2018.

== Early life and career ==
Koltunow worked as a post-doctoral fellow at CSIRO before joining the University of California, LA, from 1989 to 1990, before returning to an Australian Research Council Research Fellowship in Adelaide. She was the theme leader of Plant Industry at CSIRO. Koltunow has also worked on a humanitarian project to help farmers produce self-reproducing crops, including cowpea and sorghum crops, enabling farmers to be self-sufficient and produce higher yielding crops.

She also was on the panel of Women of Waite supporting careers in STEM, discussing career paths, and different career disciplines, inspiring young scientists to take up careers in STEM. She also has been involved in wine making from the McLaren vale.

The Australian Academy of Science described her work as follows:

"Her pioneering work in apomixis, developing and using an apomict species where remarkably, female gametes form without meiosis, and seeds develop in the absence of paternal fertilization as a genetic and molecular model has identified similarities and differences in the mechanisms controlling apomixis and sexual seed formation. Koltunow's discoveries are being used in developing crops with transformational productivity improvements in developing countries."

Koltunow has worked in plant industry as well in plant seed and fruit development, and asexual seed formation.

Koltunow held senior leadership roles at CSIRO, including as the Deputy Chief. She was on the Premier's science council in South Australia, and held a role on the ARC College of Experts.

== Selected publications ==
- Bicknell, Ross A.; Koltunow, Anna M. (2004). "Understanding Apomixis: Recent Advances and Remaining Conundrums". The Plant Cell. 16 (suppl 1): S228–S245. Bibcode:2004PlanC..16S.228B. doi:10.1105/tpc.017921. PMC 2643386. PMID 15131250.
- Koltunow, A. M. G.; Johnson, S. D.; Okada, T. (1 March 2011). "Apomixis in hawkweed: Mendel's experimental nemesis". Journal of Experimental Botany. 62 (5): 1699–1707. doi:10.1093/jxb/err011. ISSN 0022-0957. PMID 21335438.
- Koltunow, Anna; Taylor, Jen; Spriggs, Andrew; Henderson, Steven; Hand, Melanie; Johnson, Susan (2016), Hieracium Genome Resource, CSIRO, doi:10.4225/08/57d8bef575c8b
- Bicknell, Ross; Catanach, Andrew; Hand, Melanie; Koltunow, Anna (2016). "Seeds of doubt: Mendel's choice of Hieracium to study inheritance, a case of right plant, wrong trait". Theoretical and Applied Genetics. 129 (12): 2253–2266. doi:10.1007/s00122-016-2788-x. PMC 5121183. PMID 27695890.
- Spriggs, Andrew; Henderson, Steven; Taylor, Jen; Koltunow, Anna (2017), Cowpea genome and transcriptome data resource, CSIRO, doi:10.4225/08/5b1723666d6a5
- Henderson, Steven T.; Johnson, Susan D.; Eichmann, Joel; Koltunow, Anna M. G. (27 January 2017). "Genetic analyses of the inheritance and expressivity of autonomous endosperm formation in Hieracium with different modes of embryo sac and seed formation". Annals of Botany. 119 (6): 1001–1010. doi:10.1093/aob/mcw262. ISSN 0305-7364. PMC 5604576. PMID 28130222.

== Awards ==
- 2018, Fellow of the Academy of Technology, Science and Engineering.
- 2016, Fellow of the Academy of Science.
- 2010, Outstanding service award from the International Plant Reproduction society.
- 2008, Newton Turner Career Award.
