= Jenny Stauber =

Australian ecotoxicologist

- Other names: Jennifer Lee Stauber
- Education: University of Sydney
- Alma mater: University of Tasmania
- Scientific career
- Institutions: CSIRO Land and Water
- Thesis: Toxicity of Metals in Biological Systems (1996)

Jennifer Lee Stauber FAA FTSE (known as Jenny Stauber) is an Australian ecotoxicologist and chief research scientist at the CSIRO Land and Water.

== Education ==
Stauber graduated from the University of Sydney in 1979 with a BSc in biochemistry and microbiology and MSc for her thesis, titled "Photosynthetic pigments in marine diatoms", in 1984. In 1996, she completed a PhD titled "Toxicity of Metals in Biological Systems" at the University of Tasmania.

== Career ==
Stauber joined CSIRO Fisheries and Oceanography as a research scientist in 1979, moving to CSIRO Energy Chemistry in 1983 in the same role. In 2006, she transferred to CSIRO Land and Water where she was promoted to deputy chief in 2008.

== Awards and recognition ==
In 2015, Stauber was elected Fellow of the Australian Academy of Technology and Engineering (FTSE) and in 2020 Fellow of the Australian Academy of Science. She was awarded CSIRO's Lifetime Achievement Award in 2018 in recognition of her "exceptional science leadership and landmark research on the bioavailability and toxicity of metals underpinning the national water and sediment quality guidelines for environmental protection in Australia and globally".

== Selected publications ==
- Aleicia Holland; Jenny Stauber; Christopher Wood; Melanie Trenfield; Dianne F Jolley (2 March 2018). "Dissolved organic matter signatures vary between naturally acidic, circumneutral and groundwater-fed freshwaters in Australia". Water Research. 137: 184–192. doi:10.1016/J.WATRES.2018.02.043. ISSN 0043-1354. PMID 29549800. Wikidata Q51146954.
- Gabriella Macoustra; Aleicia Holland; Jenny Stauber; Dianne Jolley (13 February 2019). "Effect of Various Natural Dissolved Organic Carbon on Copper Lability and Toxicity to the Tropical Freshwater Microalga Chlorella sp". Environmental Science & Technology. 53 (5): 2768–2777. doi:10.1021/ACS.EST.8B04737. ISSN 0013-936X. PMID 30695643. Wikidata Q91268288.
- Gabriella K Macoustra; Dianne F Jolley; Jenny Stauber; Darren J Koppel; Aleicia Holland (6 July 2020). "Amelioration of copper toxicity to a tropical freshwater microalga: Effect of natural DOM source and season". Environmental Pollution. 266 (Pt 2): 115141. doi:10.1016/J.ENVPOL.2020.115141. ISSN 0269-7491. PMID 32659625. Wikidata Q97565055.
- S Stone; M S Adams; J L Stauber; D F Jolley; M St J Warne (17 November 2020). "Toxicity of herbicide mixtures to tropical freshwater microalgae using a multispecies test". Environmental Toxicology and Chemistry. doi:10.1002/ETC.4932. ISSN 0730-7268. PMID 33201550. Wikidata Q102132820.
