= ATSE =

ATSE may refer to:

- Atse, Emperor of Ethiopia
- Australian Academy of Technological Sciences and Engineering
