= Suzanne Thompson =

Artist and indigenous advocate

Suzanne M Thompson
- Occupations: Managing Director, Chair of Australian Native Foods and Botanicals
- Known for: Indigenous Knowledge Advocate
- Parent(s): David and Jennifer Thompson
- Website: https://agriculture-food-sustainability.uq.edu.au/suzanne-thompson-biography

Suzanne M Thompson or Suzanne Thompson is an artist and indigenous advocate, who was awarded a fellow of the Australian Academy of Technological Sciences and Engineering in 2025. She is a member of the Emissions Reduction Assurance Committee (ERAC), responsible for ensuring the integrity of Australia's Carbon crediting scheme.

== Education and early life ==
Thompson was born and raised in Barcaldine, where her family owned property. She and her sister Cheryl and brother David grew up in the rural area, west of Rockhampton, and their family can trace back ancestry through to their great-grandparents, including links to the Inigai and kunnergeri people. In her early years she showed a gift for art. She completed a hair dressing apprenticeship, a TAFE course, and managed a salon by the age of 19.

Her early career involved working in youth, community development and policy development. She was also an Indigenous adviser to Blak Business Smart Business. She was also a gallery owner and manager, and a stall holder at Eumundi Markets.

== Career ==
Thompson is a director of the Indigenous Carbon Industry Network, a member of the Indigenous Working Group for Landcare Australia. She is also founder of the Yambungku Aboriginal Heritage and Tourism Development Aboriginal Corporation, and Chair of Australian Native Foods and Botanicals an organisation which manages 22,000 ha of land in Central Western Queensland. She works to reimagine how social enterprise is conducted, using methods of trading that are culturally appropriate, allowing a transparent and safe economic model for indigenous people.

Thompson is also the National Co-Chair of the working group for the Statement from the Heart. She has been appointed to the Ministerial Round Table for Central Western Queensland.

Her goals are to increase investment and support for Nature based solutions, including carbon farming, First Foods and Medicines, as well as Land Management by Indigenous peoples. She is working scientists from James Cook and Queensland University to research the potential for bush foods to grow commercial crops.

"It makes so much sense to grow plants that are already adapted to this environment".

== Awards ==
- 2025 - Fellow of the Australian Academy of Technological Sciences.
