= Bronwyn Evans =

Australian business executive and engineer

Bronwyn Evans AM FTSE
- Education: University of Wollongong
- Employer(s): Standards Australia; Engineers Australia

Bronwyn Evans is an Australian engineer who was Chief Executive Officer of Engineers Australia from 2019 to 2022.

Evans completed a Bachelor of Electrical Engineering at the University of Wollongong in 1982, one of the first women to do so. She received a PhD in 1998 from the same university for her thesis, "Comparative evaluation of real time robot control systems".

Evans was chief executive officer of Standards Australia from 2013 to 2019. She was chief executive officer of Engineers Australia from 3 October 2019 until her retirement in April 2022. In February 2020 she was appointed to the Council of the University of Wollongong.

== Awards and recognition ==
Evans was elected a Fellow of the Australian Academy of Technology and Engineering in 2012. In the same year she was made an Honorary Fellow of the University of Wollongong.

In 2014 she was named as one of Australia’s Top 100 Most Influential Engineers by Engineers Australia.

She was appointed a Member of the Order of Australia in the 2021 Queen's Birthday Honours for "significant service to engineering, to standards and to medical technology."
