= Mikaela Jade =

Indigenous edu-tech entrepreneur

Mikaela Jade FTSE
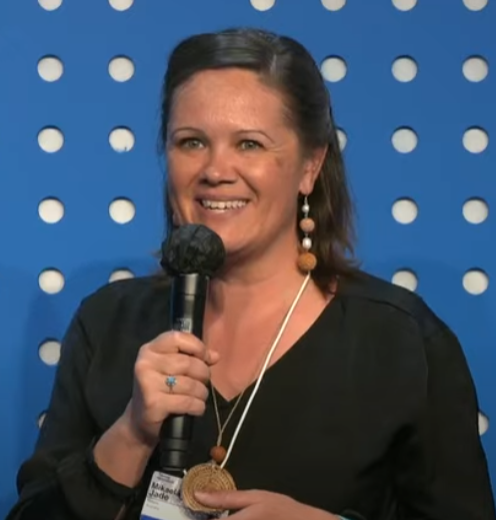
- Speaking at the 2022 World Economic Forum
- Born: Georges River, Sydney Australia
- Education: University of Technology Sydney; Charles Sturt University; Australian National University
- Occupation: CEO
- Known for: Indigenous edu-tech

Mikaela Jade is an Australian entrepreneur, and founder and CEO of Indigital, a business that aims to help embed Indigenous stories and history into the mainstream, by using augmented reality technology. She has won multiple international awards, including the Veuve Clicquot New Generation award for digital technology 2018, as well as the Schwab Foundation's Social Innovators of the Year, 2022, and Indigenous Leader of the Year, 2021. Jade has also been nominated for ACT Australian of the Year 2023 and was awarded the ANU Indigenous Alumna of the Year.

== Career and education ==
Jade is a Cabrogal woman, from the Georges River area, from the Dharug-speaking nation of Sydney. She gained a bachelor's degree in Environmental Science from the University of Technology Sydney, in 2002, and then a post-graduate Indigenous Land Management, Indigenous Studies qualification from Charles Sturt University. Jade conducted a Master's project at Australian National University, within the School of Cybernetics, on the link between the spatial web and First Nations Australian cultures. She uses digital twins, which are real-time 3D or 4D scans of a historical or culture site, which sometimes is captured before the physical site is destroyed.

Jade is the CEO and founder of Indigital, a business designed to use augmented reality to share the ancient cultural knowledge of indigenous histories. She founded Indigital, the first edu-tech company founded by Indigenous person. She worked as a park ranger in Kakadu National Park, within the Northern Territory.

Jade commented on the scientific knowledge that indigenous people contribute, that:

"We are the original scientists and engineers and we have more than 80,000 years of cultural knowledge in our sciences to bring to the table," she said. "We have a lot to contribute to STEM and a lot of opportunities for First Nations people to create sustainable and enduring businesses in this sector."

Jade is a World Economic Forum Global Futures Council member, as well as a delegate of the UN Permanent Forum on Indigenous Issues. She has also worked in the visitor experience area within the ACT Parks and Conservation service at Stromlo. Jade also, in 2018, became a member of Microsoft Australia's Reconciliation Action Plan Advisory Board. Jade also mentors 31 Aboriginal and Torres Strait Islander women from across various remote communities, to help them build their own technology platforms.

== Media ==
Jade was a speaker at an event marking the anniversary of 30 years of the ANU Bachelor of engineering degree. In 2019, Jade spoke at the United Nations, in New York, on the impact and value of new technologies in indigenous communities. Jade has been covered by the media, including The Sydney Morning Herald for her entrepreneurship, including winning awards for Indigenous technology. Her work and career have also been reported on by SBS and the Canberra Times.

Her accomplishments in digital edu-tech have also been described in the Canberra Times, which reported how a Microsoft executive saw her give a talk, and then said if she was able to successfully apply her Augmented Reality (AR) content to their product within six weeks, Microsoft would then promote her product. She met the deadline.

== Recognition & awards ==
- 2015 – Finalist, Sustaining Women's Empowerment in Communities and Organisations.
- 2018 – Instyle Women of Style Awards – Creative Visionary.
- 2018 – Veuve Clicquot New Generation Award
- 2021 – Finalist "Most impactful Initiative" at Women in Tech Global Awards.
- 2021 – Indigenous Leader of the Year, Women in Digital awards.
- 2021 – YBF Ventures ATSI Start Up or Scale Up of the year.
- 2022 – Schwab Foundation Social Innovator Award.
- 2023 – Fellow of the Australian Academy of Technological Sciences and Engineering
- 2023 – Nominated for Australian Capital Territory Australian of the Year Award
