= Michael Raupach =

Australian climatologist (1950–2015)

Michael Raupach AO FAA FTSE
- Born: 30 October 1950
- Died: 10 February 2015 (aged 64)
- Citizenship: Australia
- Occupation: climate scientist

Michael Robin Raupach AO FAA FTSE (30 October 1950 – 10 February 2015) was an Australian climate scientist. He is credited with developing the concept of a carbon budget, the amount of CO_{2} that is emitted and absorbed in the global ecosystem in the course of a year. When the in balance, CO_{2} emissions and absorption in carbon sinks are roughly the same, but when disturbed, possibly large changes in the ecosystem ensue. He was a founding co-chair of the Global Carbon Project (GCP), a network of the world's leading carbon cycle researchers. He was instrumental in publishing the Annual Carbon Budget, which draws on a large amount of scientific data to determine the level of imbalance and options for addressing it.

He worked for the Commonwealth Scientific and Industrial Research Organisation before becoming the director of the Australian National University's Climate Change Institute in 2014. He was a co-chair of the Global Carbon Project from 2000 to 2008, and contributed to the Intergovernmental Panel on Climate Change's Fourth Assessment Report in 2007. He chaired the steering committee of the ‘Australia 2050’ project of the Australian Academy of Science (AAS). In 2009–2010 he chaired the Expert Working Group on Challenges at the Intersection of Carbon, Energy and Water, reporting to the Prime Minister's Science, Engineering and Innovation Council and the Office of the Chief Scientist of Australia.

His career included the publication of 150 scientific papers and 50 reports. His research developed in three stages, the first focused on very localized flow and transport of matter and energy through and above plant canopies. At the next stage, he worked on quantification of CO_{2} transport through and above plant canopies, though still on a small scale. In the 1990s, his focus began to shift to global ecosystems when he became a member of the scientific steering committee of the Biospheric Aspects of the Hydrological Cycle core project of the IGBP (International Geosphere-Biosphere Programme). One of the most fundamental and important questions that the project addressed was: does the land-surface matter in climate and weather? His research contributed to addressing that question, through his work on turbulent fluxes near the land surface, boundary-layer budgeting and quantifying the water balance at broader scales.

He was a fellow of the Australian Academy of Science, the Australian Academy of Technological Sciences and Engineering, and the American Geophysical Union. He was appointed an Officer of the Order of Australia with effect from 12 January 2015.

Just before his death following a short illness, he co-chaired the working group of the Australian Academy of Science drafting the AAS booklet The Science of Climate Change: Questions and Answers.

== See also ==
- Climate change in Australia
