= Alessandra Pucci =

Australian biochemist and entrepreneur (born 1942)

Alessandra Pucci AO EF FTSE
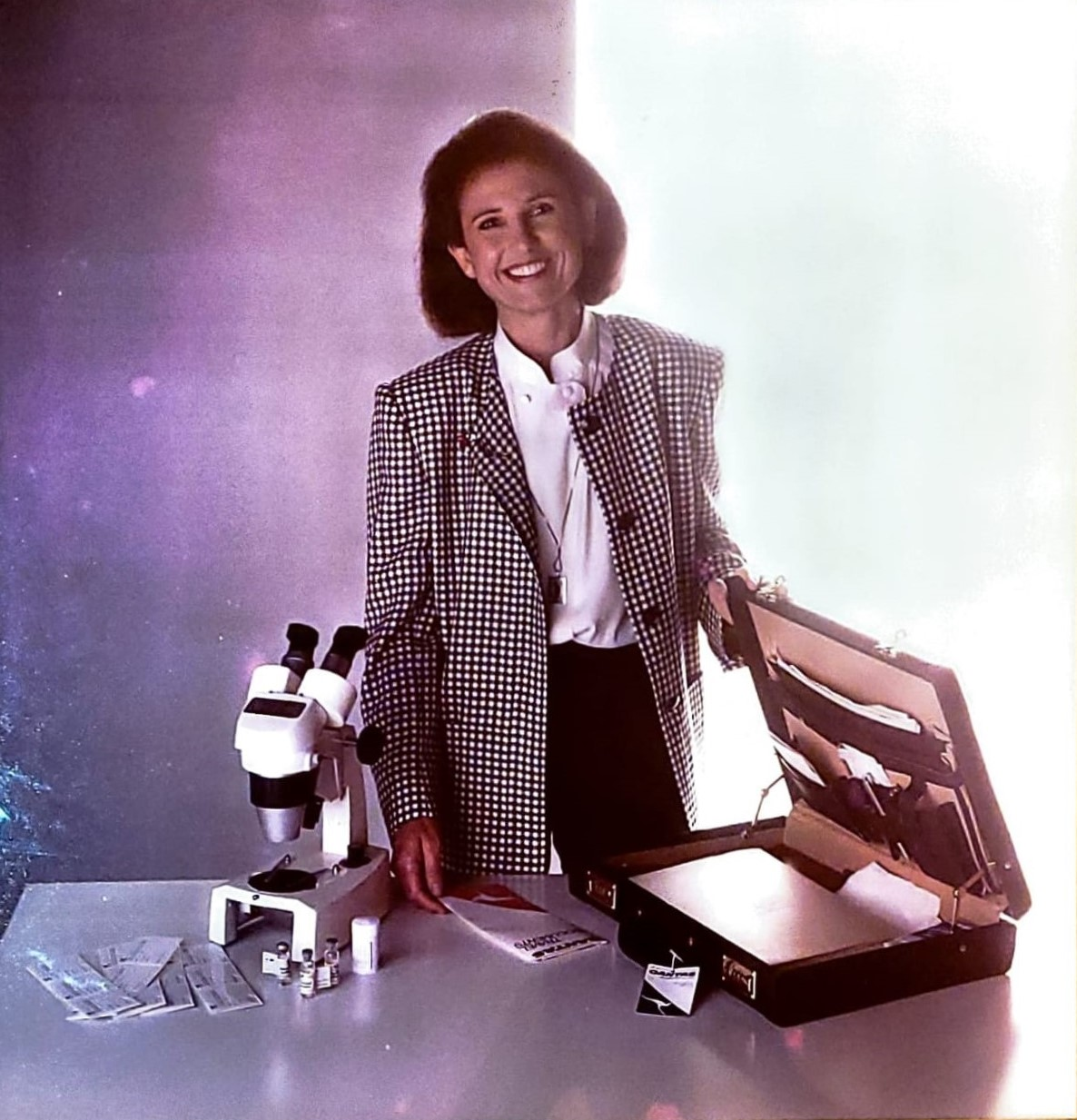
- Born: June 1942 (age 84); Eritrea
- Other names: Alessandra Alberta Pucci; Alex Pucci
- Education: University of Sydney
- Organization(s): Monoclonal Australia Ltd BioDiscovery Ltd Garvan Institute

Alessandra Alberta Pucci (born June 1942) is an Australian immunologist and entrepreneur who founded and led Australian Monoclonal Development, the first biotechnology company in Australia.

== Early life and education ==
Pucci was born in Eritrea in June 1942, one of five children of Italian parents, a journalist father and a homemaker mother. She was educated at the University of Pisa and the University of Florence.

When her husband was given an eight-month appointment in Australia, she accompanied him and they decided to settle permanently in Sydney. She enrolled in a PhD at the University of Sydney under the supervision of Professor Robert Clancy and graduated in 1981 with a thesis titled "Cellular aspects of mucosal immunology in man".

== Career ==
Pucci founded Australian Monoclonal Development Pty Ltd (AMD) in 1981, and was chief executive. It was the first biotechnology company in Australia. Listed on the Sydney Stock Exchange in 1986, as Monoclonal Australia Ltd, it was later sold to ICI Australia and merged with Silenus Laboratories. She was then appointed Director of Business Development by the Garvan Institute and later founded and was chief executive in BioDiscovery Ltd, a company that invested in medical research in Australia. It was a joint venture by the Garvan Institute, the John Curtin School of Medical Research, the University of New South Wales and the CSIRO Division of Entomology.

Pucci was on the New South Wales Science and Technology Council from 1983 to 1986 and was appointed to the national Chemicals and Plastics Industries Council in 1984. Pucci then was on the Australian Science and Technology Council from 1987 to 1989. She has also been a director of the Dairy Research and Development Corporation and of Bio-Q Pty Ltd.

Pucci is now a science writer, author of "The Scientist: A Short Essay and Two Stories", which was published in the US. She then went on to write "DEVOLUTION: The Young Self in the Face of Technology", independently published on Amazon in 2018.

== Honours and recognition ==
Pucci received The Bulletin/Qantas Businesswoman of the Year for 1986. In 1987, Pucci was made Ufficiale della Repubblica Italiana, and in the same year an Eisenhower Fellow. In the 1988 Queen's Birthday Honours, Pucci was made an Officer of the Order of Australia for "service to the community, particularly in the field of biotechnology, and to industry". She was elected a Fellow of the Australian Academy of Technology and Engineering in 1990. In 2003, Pucci received the Australian Federation Centenary Medal.
