= Vicki Chen =

Australian engineer

Vicki Chen FTSE
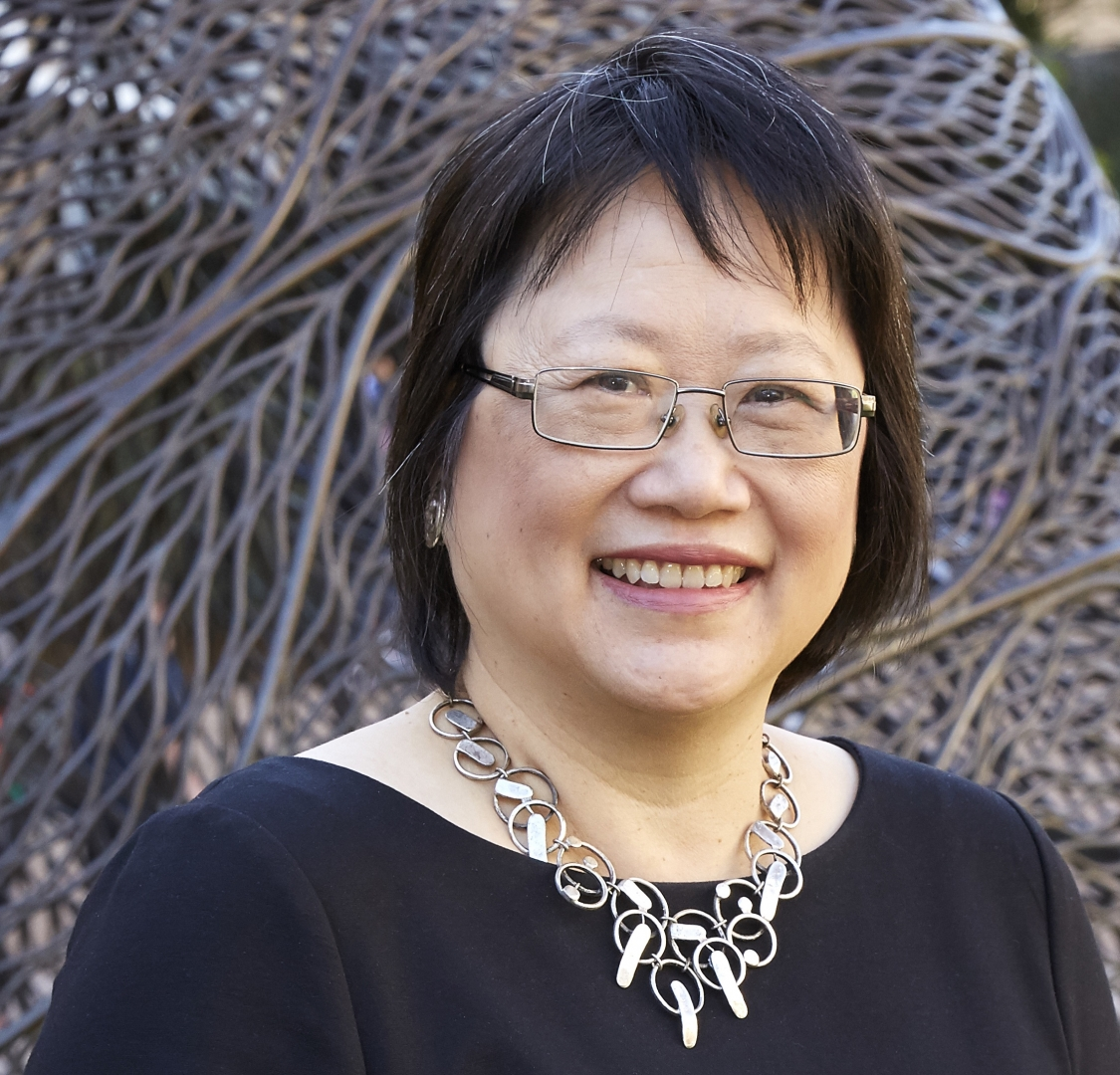
- Education: Massachusetts Institute of Technology; University of Minnesota
- Scientific career
- Fields: Membrane Engineering
- Workplaces: University of Technology Sydney
- Website: https://profiles.uts.edu.au/Vicki.Chen

Vicki Chen is an Australian engineer. She is a former Executive Dean of the Faculty of Engineering, Architecture, and Information Technology at the University of Queensland, and former Provost and Senior Vice-President of the University of Technology Sydney.[10] In 2020 she was elected as the Fellow of Australian Academy of Technology and Engineering.

Chen was inspired to pursue engineering by her father, who also worked as a chemical engineer, and viewed a path in engineering as "a career that could take [her] around the world and allow [her] to work in a wide variety of industries."

Chen received a Bachelor of Engineering degree from MIT, and went on to undertake her PhD in chemical engineering from the University of Minnesota in the area of surfactant self-assembly, including early work on microemulsion systems.

In recent years, Chen's research has focused on membrane science and engineering, with a specific focus on nanocomposite membranes, fouling, and advanced separations. This has facilitated a number of industry collaborations with partners including BASF, Dairy Innovation Australia, Australian Low Emission Coal R&D, Bluescope Steel, Coal Innovation NSW, Beijing OriginWater Technology, Printed Energy, and Sydney Water.

Chen has published more than 175 papers that have been cited more than 14,000 times, giving her an H-index of 91.

Chen spent nearly 30 years at UNSW in Sydney, Australia, going on to hold a number of senior administrative positions in research and higher education. She has been a full Professor since 2008, and acted as Head of the School of Chemical Engineering from 2014 to 2018. She was previously director of the UNESCO Centre for Membrane Science and Technology, at UNSW from 2006 to 2014.

Between August 2018 and November 2022, Chen was the Executive Dean of the Faculty of Engineering, Architecture and Information Technology at the University of Queensland, where she claimed to foster "a culture and ecosystem where our researchers and academics can flourish and contribute to the global thought leadership of their disciplines as well as translating the outcomes of their work to the wider community." During this time she was a driving force behind a Major Change proposal in the School of Architecture, that led to the disestablishment of all continuing academic appointments in the school, and the departure of seven senior architecture academics. In November 2022 Professor Chen commenced her position as the Provost and Senior Vice-President of the University of Technology Sydney. Her departure from this role was announced in April 2025.
