= Sue Murphy (businesswoman) =

Australian civil engineer and business executive

Sue Murphy AO FTSE
- Education: University of Western Australia
- Occupations: Business executive, engineer
- Employer(s): Clough Engineering; Water Corporation

Susan Lee Murphy AO is an Australian business executive and engineer. She has worked at chief executive level in private industry and a government utility.

== Career ==
Murphy graduated from the University of Western Australia with a Bachelor of Civil Engineering in 1979. She joined Clough Engineering in 1980 and, in 1998 became the first woman on its board. She rose to chief executive officer of its Minerals and Infrastructure Division before she left in 2004 to join Water Corporation. After four years as general manager of planning and infrastructure, Murphy became chief executive officer in 2008.

Murphy was appointed to the board of Monadelphous in June 2019. Other board roles include Western Australian Treasury Corporation and Fremantle Football Club.

== Awards and recognition ==
Murphy was elected a Fellow of the Australian Academy of Technology and Engineering in 2009. Four years running Engineers Australia named her in the top 100 engineers in Australia. She received the 2014 Women in Water award from the International Water Association. She was made an Officer of the Order of Australia in the 2019 Queen's Birthday Honours for "distinguished service to the natural resources sector in Western Australia, and to engineering".
