= Kimberley Swords =

- Education: University of Queensland
- Occupations: Founder and CEO
- Employer: Riffle Advisory
- Known for: Sustainability policy

Kimberley Swords is a founder and CEO of Riffle Advisory, Program Director of the Oxford Transformative Project Leadership Program at University of Queensland. Swords was recognised as a Fellow of the Australian Academy of Technological Sciences in 2025.

== Education and early life ==
Swords has a Bachelor of Veterinary Science (hons) from the University of Queensland and an MBA from RMIT. She also is a graduate of the Australian Institute of Company Directors. Early in her career she worked as a large animal country vet. Her passion for the environment let to a career transition to Natural Resource Management.

== Career ==
Swords was previously a McKinsey and Nous group management consultant. Her experience includes advising on net zero strategies, as well as climate risk and nature and natural capital leadership, as well as coaching. She has worked at UNESCO, UNEP and Interpol as well as other international agencies. Swords was Chair of Southern Queensland Landscapes and University of Queensland Industry Professor. In 2010, she was appointed as the Deputy Secretary within the Australian Government, working in heritage and conservation as well as protection of the environment.

Swords is a member of the Working group on the International Advisory Panel on Biodiversity Credits, a Program Director for the UQ Transformative Leadership Program. She is also the Chair of the Southern Queensland Landscapes.

== Awards ==
- 2025 – Fellow of the Australian Academy of Technological Sciences and Engineering.
