= Kathryn West =

Australian engineer and architect

- Occupation: Chief Operating Officer
- Employer: ARUP
- Known for: Engineering
- Website: https://www.arup.com/contact-us/kate-west/

Kathryn West or Kate West FTSE is an Australian engineer, architect and executive. West was elected a Fellow of the Australian Academy of Technological Sciences and Engineering in 2026. She was a co-chair of Arup, with Kerryn Coker.

== Education ==
West has a Bachelor of Engineering (First Class honors) from the University of Western Australia, and a Masters of Architecture from the University of Cambridge, obtained in 2007.

== Career ==
West is Chief Officer, Business and Products, Arup. She has written articles for digital media on AI and their potential for addressing a 'productivity slump'. West is a Chartered Professional Engineer, and in 2019 she took up the position of Australian Region Board Member. She was then invited to be co-chair for Arup, for the Australasian Region, for the region across Malaysia, Indonesia, Singapore, New Zealand and Australia.

West's career was notable, as she was invited to be a chair at Arup, and suggested and was hired for a job-share position with Keryn Coker, providing a role model of 'successful collaborative leadership'.

== Awards ==
- 2025 - Fellow of the Australian Academy of Technological Sciences and Engineering.
- 2024 - AFR Women in Leadership awards.
- 2024 - National Honorary Fellow - Engineers Australia.
- 2018 - WA Business Review 40U40 Business Leaders Award.
- 2017 National Association of Women in Construction (NAWIC) Crystal Vision Award.
