= Jan Maree Tennent =

Australian biomedical researcher (born 1960)

Jan Tennent
- Born: Melbourne, Victoria, Australia
- Awards: Board Diversity Scholarship, Australian Government Office for Women, Australian Institute of Company Directors (2013); Perpetual Trust Scholarship (2011)
- Scientific career
- Fields: Biomedical Research and Innovation
- Workplaces: biomedvic.org.au

Jan Maree Tennent (born 1 January 1960) is an Australian scientist in the biomedical and animal health research sectors, and a Fellow of the Australian Academy of Technological Sciences and Engineering.

== Early life and education ==
Tennent was born in Footscray, Melbourne, Victoria on 1 January 1960. She obtained a Bachelor of Science, in microbiology from the Monash University in Melbourne in 1981. She completed her PhD in 1986 at Monash University. Her PhD thesis was entitled 'Molecular Analysis of Plasmids in Multi-resistant Staphylococci'.

== Career ==
Tennent left Australia in 1986 to do a four-year postdoctoral fellowship with Prof Staffan Normark at Umeå University in Sweden. She researched the genetic mechanism and control of host attachment by uropathogenic Escherichia coli as part of the Normark laboratory's research.

Tennent returned to Australia and joined the CSIRO as a senior research scientist. She became the program manager of the Vaccines and Immunology Group in 1997. Tennent has researched and given keynote presentations in the field of biotechnology and animal vaccines.

In 2000, Tennent joined the global biotherapy organisation CSL Limited and later became a member of the CSL Animal Health executive team. Tennent joined the international pharmaceutical company Pfizer in 2004. In 2009, Tennent founded ConnectBio Pty Ltd.

In 2011, Tennent was appointed as the Chief Executive Officer of Biomedical Research Victoria, a body that represents Australia's biomedical research. In 2017, Tennent was elected to the AusBiotech Board.

Tennent has published 35 contributions in international peer-reviewed scientific journals (1984–2006) and eight reviews, theses and book chapters on microbial pathogenesis. She served on research-related committees including the Genetic Manipulation Advisory Committee (now the Office of the Gene Technology Regulator) between 1995 and 2001.

Tennent worked at RMIT University and was a Principal Fellow at the University of Melbourne. In 2019, Tennent was elected Fellow of the Australian Academy of Technological Sciences and Engineering (FTSE).
