= Katherine Woodthorpe =

Australian company director, president and chair

Katherine Woodthorpe AO FTSE
- Born: Malaysia
- Education: BSc (Hons) Manchester University, PhD Chemistry, Leicester University
- Occupation: Professional company director
- Known for: Chair Bushfire & Natural Hazards CRC & Antarctic Science Foundation & President of the Australian Academy of Technology and Engineering
- Title: Dr

Katherine Lesley Woodthorpe is an Australian chair and company director, and Fellow of the Australian Academy of Technology and Engineering, and fellow of the Australian Institute of Company Directors. She has also been chair of the Cooperative Research Centre (CRC) for Bushfire and Natural Hazards, chair of Antarctic Climate and Ecosystems CRC, as well as Chair of National Climate Science Advisory Committee.

== Early life and career ==
Woodthorpe was born in Malaysia and grew up in Hong Kong. She obtained a honours degree in chemistry, at the University of Manchester Institute of Science and Technology, then a PhD in chemistry from the University of Leicester. She worked in Western Australia, and then Europe, as well as selling medical products in Western Australia. She was employed in her role in Western Australia during a time when women were 'discriminated against', and not allowed to work underground nor drink with their colleagues. She has one son. She has served on the board of the Olivia Newton-John Cancer Research Institute, as well as charing the Hearing CRC, and the tech start-up Fishburners.

Woodthorpe was the Chief Executive of AVCAL, which is the Australian Private Equity and Venture Capital Association. She has worked in private equity and insurance sectors, as well as technology, healthcare and mining industries. She is also a fellow of the Australian Institute of Company Directors.

In 2022 she became the first woman appointed President of the Australian Academy of Technological Sciences and Engineering.

== Gender equity ==
Upon being awarded the Order of Australia, Woodthorpe commented on the role of women in STEM in Australia,

"I hope [receiving this honor] encourages more nominations of women in science and business worlds as there are so many more important contributions going unrecognized".

She has argued that more women are required to be appointed to leadership roles, and specifically, chairing roles, which will allow diverse thinking 'otherwise group think sets in'

Woodthorpe has a syndicate within the organisation "Women in Boards" named after her. She has also been a panelist on an event discussing gender within science, addressing the chronic under-representation and loss of female talent in the scientific workforce, on 'Gender Balance in Science", hosted at ANU.

== Media ==
Woodthorpe has been active on both radio and print media.

In 2018, she said that company directors were being urged by investors to act on climate change. She argued that companies which have infrastructure in coastal areas with risks of climate related events had special interest in acting on climate change.

"In other countries climate change is not a political… and it is disappointing that it is not [given the same support] in Australia."

Woodthorpe has discussed the need for evidence and decisions based on facts, particularly in relation to vaccines. She discussed the cuts to funding for science research, arguing that the science cuts will hold back the Australian economy.

== Prizes honours and awards ==
- 2011 – Honorary PhD, UTS.
- 2013 – Australian Financial Review's 100 women of influence.
- 2015 – Fellow of the Australian Academy of Technology and Engineering.
- 2017 – Officer of the Order of Australia.
- 2021 – National Press Club, Ralph Slatyer Address on Science and Technology.
