= James Vernon (chemist) =

Sir James Vernon AC CBE FTSE (1910–2000) was an Australian industrial chemist who, amongst other things, served as Director of CSR (Colonial Sugar Refining Company) 1958–1982.

He also served on the boards of a raft of other companies including: Director, Westham Dredging Company Pty Ltd 1975–1991; Chairman, CIBC Australia Ltd 1974–1989; Chairman, Volvo Australia Pty Ltd 1980–1989; Chairman, O'Connell St Associates, and International President of the Pacific Basin Economic Council 1980–1982.

== Vernon Report ==
In 1965, Vernon issued a major economic report from "the committee of economic enquiry" regarding Australia's economy.

== Honours and awards ==
- 1961 Officer of the Order of the British Order (OBE)
- 1962 Commander of the Order of the British Empire (CBE)
- 1965 Knight Bachelor
- 1965 Leighton Medal, Royal Australian Chemical Institute
- 1976 Foundation Fellow, Australian Academy of Technological Sciences and Engineering
- 1980 Companion of the Order of Australia (AC)
- John Storey Medal, Australian Institute of Management
- Order of Sacred Treasure 1st Class Japan
