= Fiona Kerr =

Cognitive neuroscientist

- Education: University of Adelaide Business School / School of Engineering / currently Psychology
- Occupation: Founder of NeuroTech Institute
- Known for: Neuroscience and Systems Engineering/AI
- Website: https://www.theneurotechinstitute.com

Fiona Kerr is a specialist in cognitive neuroscience, neurotechnology, psychology and AI who was elected a fellow of the National Academy, the Australian Academy of Technological Sciences and Engineering in 2024 for her recognition of "technology and human centered research, and advisory role on the ethical use of Artificial Intelligence".

== Career ==
In 2014, Kerr received a PhD from the University of Adelaide's business school for her thesis, "Creating and leading adaptive organisations: the nature and practice of emergent logic".

She is an advocate for better understanding the neurophysiological impacts of human interaction and proximity (altering how people think, feel, bond, heal, make decisions and belong), and how this should inform the design and use of quality AI that will enable a human centric future shaped by how people want to live and work together. . In 2018 Fiona set up the NeuroTech Institute as an independent entity with a multi-disciplinary approach to building a human-centric, technologically-enabled future that gets the best from both humans and AI by understanding the unique advantages of both, when to partner them and how the underlying system can support flourishment. Her consistent theme is "How do we shape each other; how does technology shape us and how should we shape technology?"

NTI consults with companies, governments, and academia globally, particularly on the multifactorial impacts of direct human interaction and proximity on cognition and physiology and how this changes with technological interaction and intermediation, both of which inform technological innovation, design and use. Research and work projects have included how to increase neurogenesis at any age; the neurophysiological impact of human proximity, positive collaboration and technological intermediation on complex problem solving and trust; ensuring human-centric, technologized health and care sectors; the role of both human and technological intervention in learning and behaviour change; autonomous systems teaming and the complexities of building accurate brain computer interfaces; building successful hybrid systems in current psychosocial settings; and managing technology as an enabler. Her 3 year research project with the US Department of Defence looked at "The use of Systems Complexity and Cognitive Neuroscience to inform and design Trusted Human-Synthetic Partnerships".

Dr Kerr continues to work in Australia and overseas with a range of government and corporate groups and sectors on asking the right questions for adopting quality driven technologization, AI and innovation (such as the positives and negatives of agentic AI, developing virtual therapeutic relationships, and virtual learning and complex problem solving). She joined Sir Richard Bransons '100% human at work' in 2023, and became a science advisor for the Swedish tech company Brainpulse in August, 2026, partnering with CSEM. Dr Kerr’s unique perspective on the power of human cognition and interaction, and how to create technology which is transformative, is assisted by qualifications in complex systems engineering, anthropology, psychology and cognitive science, and the experience gained over 40 years in a variety of companies and sectors both in Australia and overseas. She holds or has held board director and advisory positions with a number of entities including Finland’s National AI committee; Standards Australia Global MP-027 Ageing Societies committee; ATSE’s ELEVATE:Boosting diversity in STEM program; Tutti Arts Incorporated (multi-arts organisation); the National Health and Medical Technology Forum Leadership Group; Global Health and Medical Industries Ministerial Advisory Panel & Digital Health Roundtable; the Catalyst Foundation (aging and disability), Bionics Queensland, R4 Robotics, Australia’s Ethical AI in Defence workgroup, Sparks & Honey (NYC), and Curated (NYC).

Fiona holds honorary academic positions here and overseas including Research Fellow at the South Australian Health and Medical Research Institute (SAHMRI), Adjunct Senior Fellow with Adelaide University (Psychology), and collaboration partner with University College Dublin’s SMARTlab. She is an international speaker and science educator, appearing regularly on both national and international media (including (in Australia) SBS Insight, ABC Catalyst, Radio National and Ockham’s Razor.

Kerr has co-written a blog post on Parkinson's disease, and has been interviewed for some online news outlets on stress and sleep deprivation. She was interviewed by the ABC in 2019 around the neurophysiology of connecting with human interactions.

Kerr has conducted research around the impacts of online learning, and prolonged screen time, compared with in person and eye-to-eye contact. She has discussed how eye contact can raise hormonal levels, including dopamine and oxytocin, and this also lowers cortisol levels.

Kerr is also a board member of Tutti Arts as well as the private organisations, R for Robotics and Curated.

Kerr is an ambassador of the Women in Innovation organisation, known as WINN which aims to elevate women in science, engineering, technology, arts and mathematics.

== Publications ==
Kerr has published on the neurophysiology of human presence, technology and screen time, as well as complex systems, including the following publications:

- "Creative Management of Complex Systems" – Jean-Alain Heraud, Fiona Kerr, Thierry Burger-Helmchen (2018)
- Hazelton LM, Gillin LM, Kerr F, Kitson A, Lindsay N (2019), "An ageing well collaboration: opportunity or wicked problem". Journal of Business Strategy, Vol. 40 No. 1 pp. 18–27, doi: An ageing well collaboration: opportunity or wicked problem.
- Kerr F, Gockowiak (2021). The effect of Human Presence and Interaction on Complex Decision Making: Year 2 Report.

== Awards and recognition ==
- 2018 - South Australian of the year - nominee.
- 2024 - Fellow of the Australian Academy of Technological Sciences and Engineering.

Innovations of the world Engineering Australia
