= Helen Cleugh =

Atmospheric scientist

Helen A. Cleugh is a New Zealand atmospheric scientist. She is currently the Chief Research Scientist in Commonwealth Scientific and Industrial Research Organisation (CSIRO) (Oceans and Atmosphere) where she leads the Earth Systems and Climate Change Hub.

Cleugh's research focuses on observing and predicting atmospheric, climate and marine systems and determining how they interact with human activities.

== Career ==
Cleugh grew up on a farm in Central Otago in New Zealand, and earned a BSc with Honours at the University of Otago in 1981. Cleugh received her doctorate in Geography in 1987 from the University of British Columbia, and was a lecturer at Macquarie University School of Earth Sciences in Sydney from 1987 to 1994. Cleugh has been a Scientist with the CSIRO since 1994 where she has been working Earth systems research capabilities and climate modeling.

Her research concentration is on interactions between climate and land surfaces, with a focus on the amount of carbon dioxide is taken up by ecosystems.

Cleugh was the Deputy Director of the Centre for Australian Weather and Climate Research (CAWCR) from 2007 to 2009. She then went on to lead CMAR Climate and Atmosphere Theme where in collaboration with CAWCR, her team developed a long-term observation study on aerosols to predict the future trends of Australia's rainfall. Speaking of the work she leads at CSIRO in developing climate models, in 2014 she said:

Because we’ve developed it here in Australia, it does as good as job as we can of representing factors that are important for Australia such as the El Niño-Southern Oscillation-type phenomena, as well as representing Australian ecosystems and the oceanic systems that are around Australia.

=== Honours and awards ===
Cleugh was an Erskine Fellow at the Geographical Department in the University of Canterbury, New Zealand in 2002.

- AMOS R.H. Clarke Lecture, 2018
- Fellow of the Australian Academy of Technological Sciences and Engineering (FTSE), 2019
