= Su McCluskey =

Agricultural advocacy

- Education: University of Canberra
- Employer: Cluskers Holdings
- Known for: Agriculture consulting

Su McCluskey is an Australian agriculture advocate who was awarded as a Fellow of the Australian Academy of Technological Sciences and Engineering in 2023. She has a background in agricultural policy, production and research, and she is the Commissioner for International Agricultural Research. She is the first Special Representative for Australian Agriculture, promoting agriculture for the Australian Government's Global Agriculture Leadership Initiative.

== Education ==
McCluskey received a Bachelor of Commerce from the University of Canberra. Her other qualifications include a Fellow Certified Practising Accountant (FCPA), in addition to a Bachelor of Commerce from the University of Canberra.

== Career ==
McCluskey has served as the CEO of the Council of Rural Research and Development Corporations. She also has held the position of executive director at the Office of Best Practice Regulation. McCluskey also held roles within the Business Council of Australia, the National Farmers’ Federation, and the Australian Taxation Office. In addition, she is actively engaged in beef cattle farming in Yass, New South Wales.

McCluskey served as a Commissioner on the Australian National COVID-19 Advisory Board and held positions on a number of panels and tasksforces, including as a member of the Deregulation Taskforce Advisory Panel, the Charities Review, and the Small Business Digital Taskforce. She also contributed her expertise as a member of the Independent Review Panel for CPA Australia, the Harper Review of Competition Policy, and the NSW Review of the Regulatory Framework.

McCluskey was the CEA of the Regional Australia Institute from 2012 to 2015. She commented on leadership, that it is important to inspire other people to 'come along on the journey'.

“It’s not about telling, it’s about listening and about saying ‘how can we work together’ and ‘how can we make a difference’, because a collective is much more powerful and can achieve more than one person.”

She was a speaker at the Crawford Fund for a Secure World Conference in 2021 and the Plenary speaker at the TropAg International Agriculture Conference in Brisbane, 2022.

== Awards ==
- 2013 - Westpac/Australian Financial Review Regional Women of Influence.
- 2014 - Women in Agribusiness award - for outstanding contribution to policy development.
