= Iris Depaz =

Pharmaceuticals researcher and manager

- Born: 21 September 1976
- Died: 12 August 2024 (aged 47)
- Occupation: Managing Director
- Employer: Sanofi
- Known for: Biotechnology
- Title: Dr

Iris Depaz (21 September 1976 – 12 August 2024) was a pharmaceuticals researcher and manager, who was posthumously elected a fellow of the Australian Academy of Technological Sciences and Engineering in 2024, in recognition of her 'influence on creating impact from medical research, bringing it into the clinic'. She was Head of Medical Vaccines and managing director of the Translational Science Hub of Sanofi, in Queensland.

== Education and early life ==
Depaz graduated with a Bachelor of Science, Honours, from the University of Queensland in 1998, a Doctor of Philosophy in Molecular Biology, on neuronal drug metabolism and alcohol dependency, from the University of Queensland in 2003, as well as a Graduate Certificate of Higher Education in 2006, also from the University of Queensland. She completed an executive MBA during lockdown in 2020.

== Career ==
Depaz worked in translation and commercialisation of medical research in the scientific community, creating an mRNA technology and translational science community. She was a champion of investing in pharmaceutical companies within Australia, as opposed to losing the Intellectual Property of health technology in overseas developments.

Depaz was previously the Global Head of MSL Centre for Excellence, in Lyon, France. She started as the Pasteur'sHead of Medical at Sanofi, for Australia and New Zealand, in 2021.

Depaz had more than 20 years of global industry experience, and specialist skills in the pharmaceutical and biotechnology sectors. She was previously a director of an AI and block-chain start-up, which focussed on allowing patients to make healthcare decisions which were informed by ownership of their own data.

Depaz was the Founder of the Translational Science Hub, connecting the Queensland Government, Griffith University, and the University of Queensland, with links in France and the USA.

== Personal life ==
Depaz died on 12 August 2024. She was the mother of A.J. and Abi, daughter of Julian and America, and sister of Keny. Her memorial service was held on 20 August 2024.

== Awards and honours ==
- 2025 – Depaz Oration, an annual keynote introduced at the AusBiotech Conference in memory of Depaz.
- 2024 – Life Sciences Queensland – Hall of fame award – in recognition of outstanding contributions to the Queensland life sciences sector.
- 2024 – shortlisted – Life Sciences Queensland GENE award.
- 2023 – elected to AusBiotech Board, 2023.
- 2021 – Best and Brightest – Executive MBAs – IMD Business School.

== Publications ==
Depaz had numerous publications on the impacts of alcohol and drugs on human health.
