= Victoria Gordon =

Pharmaceutical researcher

- Occupations: Founder, QBiotics
- Employer: QBiotics
- Known for: Microbiology
- Title: Dr
- Website: https://qbiotics.com/news-item/dr-victoria-gordon-2025-atse-fellow-medical-innovation

Dr Victoria Gordon is an Australian pharmaceutical researcher. She has conducted research into how rainforests of northern Australia may yield chemicals, which may form the basis of new cancer-treating pharmaceuticals. Her research, along with colleagues, has led to treatments approved by the USA FDA for the treatment of dog cancers, a range of solid tumours in humans and a wound healing treatment with activity against acute and chronic wounds and burns. Dr Gordon was elected a Fellow of the Australian Academy of Technological Sciences and Engineering in 2025.

== Early life ==
Dr Gordon was raised in the Southern Highlands of New South Wales, and was one of seven children. Her father died when Gordon was aged 11 and her mother died when she was 21, both from cancer. Dr Gordon completed a Bachelor of Applied Sciences degree at the University of Tasmania, a Doctor of Philosophy in Microbiology at the James Cook University Townsville supported by a scholarship from the Commonwealth Scientific and Industrial Research Organisation (CSIRO). She later completed a Bachelor of Arts in archaeology at the University of Leicester in the UK.

Dr Gordon worked as a lecturer at the University of Tasmania, and in research in the Tasmanian timber industry, for Boral. She subsequently moved to CSIRO and worked there for six years. Dr Gordon was co-founder, CEO and managing director of the QBiotics Group for approximately 24 years and is currently Chief Strategy Officer and executive director of that company.

== Career ==
Dr Gordon, and Dr Paul Reddell, set up a laboratory in the Atherton Tableland, and created a discovery technology, called EcoLogic, to identify rainforest plants with specific bioactivity properties such as anticancer, antimicrobial, antiinflammatory and antiparasitic. The average success rate of screening for biological activity in the samples tested was 90%.

After sending the samples to a laboratory that specalised in microbial screening, the lab then took an equity stake in the company. Drs Gordon and Reddell established their first discovery company EcoBiotics in 2000, which was based on EcoLogic. Drs Gordon and Reddell established a second company in 2010, called QBiotics, as a drug development company to develop selected discoveries into the human clinic. They merged EcoBiotics and QBiotics in 2017 to form the QBiotics Group .

== Publications ==
Dr Gordon has publications on microbiology and rainforest plants. Select examples include the following:

- Maslovskaya, L.A., Savchenko, A.I., Gordon, V.A., Reddell, P.W., Pierce, C.J., Boyle, G.M., Parsons, P.G. and Williams, C.M. (2019), New Halimanes from the Australian Rainforest Plant Croton Insularis. Eur. J. Org. Chem., 2019: 1058–1060. https://doi.org/10.1002/ejoc.201801548
- Cullen JK, Yap P, Ferguson B, Bruce ZC, Koyama M, Handoko H, et al. Tigilanol tiglate is an oncolytic small molecule that induces immunogenic cell death and enhances the response of both target and non-injected tumors to immune checkpoint blockade. Journal for ImmunoTherapy of Cancer. 2024;12:e006602. https://doi.org/10.1136/jitc-2022-006602.
- Maslovskaya, L.A., Savchenko, A.I., Gordon, V.A., Reddell, P.W., Pierce, C.J., Boyle, G.M., Parsons, P.G. and Williams, C.M. (2019), New Halimanes from the Australian Rainforest Plant Croton Insularis. Eur. J. Org. Chem., 2019: 1058–1060. https://doi.org/10.1002/ejoc.201801548.

== Cancer treatment ==
In the 2025 World Science Festival, at Brisbane, Dr Gordon's company QBiotics Group provided images of the microbiology from plants and the natural environment. QBiotics Group provided images of a seed found on the Atherton Tablelands, which is part of an anticancer treatment called 'tigilanol tiglate', which can be used for the treatment of mast cell tumours and has received approval in the Australian market. The drug is also in phase II trials for head and neck cancer and soft tissue scarcoma.

The QBiotics Group drug has received FDA approval in the United States for treatment of dogs with cancer. The active ingredient in this treatment is sourced from a seed from the Fontainea group, in rainforests in northern Queensland, and can provide 75% tumour resolution after one injection.

== Awards ==
- 2025 - Fellow of the Australian Academy of Technological Sciences and Engineering.
- 2004 - Queensland premiers award for service to biotechnology.
