= Rachelle Doyle =

- Employer: Rio Tinto
- Known for: Energy transition advocate

Rachelle Doyle is an Australian engineer working in energy transitions and low carbon futures, employed by Rio Tinto. Doyle was elected as a Fellow of the Australian Academy of Technological Sciences and Engineering (ATSE) in 2024.

== Education ==
Doyle has a Bachelor of Chemical Engineering, from Curtin University.

== Career ==
Doyle has worked in the field of energy transition, with experience in both energy and mineral processing in Western Australia. She has worked on national level projects across Australia that involved mining, a low carbon transition, across the fields of technology, science, and engineering. Doyle works towards creating long-term relationships across partnerships, which is crucial to allow the sustainable transition towards climate mitigation, as well as contributing towards a clean energy transition and working towards the goal of net zero emissions.

Doyle was chair of Standards Australia ME093 Hydrogen Technologies Committee, and has developed standards and guidelines for the roll-out of hydrogen technologies within Australia in a safe and sustainable manner. Doyle has held advisory roles in the field of low-carbon technologies, and a sustainable energy future. She has also published around sustainability and safety management at Woodside. Doyle has been an invited keynote speaker at the Australian National Hydrogen conference and is on the advisory board for the Curtin Institute for Energy Transition, as well as Chair of the CSIRO Hydrogen Mission and Standards Australia committee.

She has also been involved in shaping the policy, and guidelines around hydrogen technologies within Australia. She is a Fellow of the Institution of Chemical Engineers.

== Media ==
Doyle has been interviewed after her ATSE fellowship, on the importance of women in STEM, and provided career advice.

Doyle has been an invited speaker at industry conferences and symposium discussing mining, minerals, and low carbon transitions. Doyle was also a judge at the 'Women in Mining' awards.

== Awards ==
- 2024 - Fellow of the Australian Academy of Technological Sciences and Engineering.
