= Renate Egan =

Solar energy researcher

- Occupation: Professor
- Employer: University of New South Wales
- Known for: Photovoltaics
- Website: https://www.unsw.edu.au/staff/renate-egan

Renate Egan is an Australian academic who is the executive director of the Australian Centre for Advanced Photovoltaics, a centre for collaboration on photovoltaics research led by University of New South Wales. She is Deputy Head of School for Engagement in the School of Solar PV and Renewable Energy Engineering, at UNSW, and a fellow of the Australian Academy of Technological Sciences and Engineering.

== Education ==
Egan received a PhD from Macquarie University (1984–1992) and graduated from the Australian Institute of Company Directors in 2011.

== Career ==
Egan has worked for 20 years in manufacturing and industrial technology within the energy sector across Australia, Germany, and China. As a co-founder of Solar Analytics, an independent energy monitoring provider in Australia, her contributions led to her being named one of 'eight notable women' from around the world, in the science and solar business by Renewable Energy World. They listed Egan as one of the women whose careers "stand as an example to young women of what is possible". The founder of Renewable Energy World stated:

"Dr. Egan's commitment to the science, engineering and to the analytics required to keep the global PV industry on its trajectory to becoming a mainstream electricity source serves as an example to young women considering a career in the solar industry."

Egan was inducted into the Australian Smart Energy Council Hall of Fame and is the co-founder of five start-ups, including Solar Analytics Pty Ltd. She is the executive director of the Australian Centre for Advanced Photovoltaics, and was named the co-chair of the Australia-India Solar Task Force.

== Media ==
Egan has published with Renew Economy on the topic of 'whether renewables are up to the challenge of Energy Transition' in Australia, based on Australia's target of 82% renewables by 2030. She also wrote for Renew Economy, on how the cost of solar panels had decreased by 90% as at 2022, and future directions for ultra cheap electricity without reliance on fossil fuels. Egan is a spokesperson for the Climate Media Centre.

== Publications ==
Egan has at least one publication in Nature Communications and over 2600 citations and an H number of 25, according to Google Scholar as at May 2024.

=== Journal articles ===
Select journal articles from 2022 to 2024 include the following:

- Dehghanimadvar M; Egan R; Chang NL, 2024, 'Quantifying the costs of diversifying silicon PV module assembly with local economic policies', Joule.
- Tan V; Deng R; Egan R, 2024, 'Solar photovoltaic waste and resource potential projections in Australia, 2022–2050', Resources, Conservation and Recycling, 202.
- Weerasinghe HC; Macadam N; Kim JE; Sutherland LJ; Angmo D; Ng LWT; Scully AD; Glenn F; Chantler R; Chang NL; Dehghanimadvar M; Shi L; Ho-Baillie AWY; Egan R; Chesman ASR; Gao M; Jasieniak JJ; Hasan T; Vak D, 2024, 'The first demonstration of entirely roll-to-roll fabricated perovskite solar cell modules under ambient room conditions', Nature Communications, 15.
- Abad B; Alberi K; Ayers KE; Badhulika S; Ban C; Béa H; Béron F; Cairney J; Chang JP; Charles C; Creatore M; Dong H; Du J; Egan R; Everschor-Sitte K; Foley C; Fontcuberta i Morral A; Jung MH; Kim H; Kurtz S; Lee J; Leitao DC; Lemmer K; Marschilok AC; Mitu B; Newman BK; Owens R; Pappa AM; Park Y; Peckham M; Rossi LM; Shim SH; Siddiqui SA; Son JW; Spiga S; Tsikata S; Vianello E; Wilson K; Yuasa H; Zardo I; Zenyuk I; Zhang Y; Zhao Y, 2023, 'The 2022 applied physics by pioneering women: a roadmap', Journal of Physics D: Applied Physics, 56.
- Chang NL; Poduval GK; Sang B; Khoo K; Woodhouse M; Qi F; Dehghanimadvar M; Li WM; Egan RJ; Hoex B, 2023, 'Techno-economic analysis of the use of atomic layer deposited transition metal oxides in silicon heterojunction solar cells', Progress in Photovoltaics: Research and Applications, 31, pp. 414 - 428.
- Yildiz B; Stringer N; Klymenko T; Syahman Samhan M; Abramowitz G; Bruce A; MacGill I; Egan R; Sproul AB, 2023, 'Real-world data analysis of distributed PV and battery energy storage system curtailment in low voltage networks', Renewable and Sustainable Energy Reviews, 186.
- Chang NL; Dehghanimadvar M; Egan R, 2022, 'The cost of risk mitigation—Diversifying the global solar PV supply chain', Joule, 6, pp. 2686 - 2688.
- Chang NL; Newman BK; Egan RJ, 2022, 'Future cost projections for photovoltaic module manufacturing using a bottom-up cost and uncertainty model', Solar Energy Materials and Solar Cells, 237.
- Dehghanimadvar M; Egan R; Chang NL, 2022, 'Economic assessment of local solar module assembly in a global market', Cell Reports Physical Science, 3.
- Dias PR; Schmidt L; Chang NL; Monteiro Lunardi M; Deng R; Trigger B; Bonan Gomes L; Egan R; Veit H, 2022, 'High yield, low cost, environmentally friendly process to recycle silicon solar panels: Technical, economic and environmental feasibility assessment', Renewable and Sustainable Energy Reviews, 169.
- Heslop S; Yildiz B; Roberts M; Chen D; Lau T; Naderi S; Bruce A; MacGill I; Egan R, 2022, 'A Novel Temperature-Independent Model for Estimating the Cooling Energy in Residential Homes for Pre-Cooling and Solar Pre-Cooling', Energies, 15.
- Zhang J; Chang N; Fagerholm C; Qiu M; Shuai L; Egan R; Yuan C, 2022, 'Techno-economic and environmental sustainability of industrial-scale productions of perovskite solar cells', Renewable and Sustainable Energy Reviews, 158.
- Chang NL; Zheng J; Wu Y; Shen H; Qi F; Catchpole K; Ho-Baillie A; Egan RJ, 2021, 'A bottom-up cost analysis of silicon–perovskite tandem photovoltaics', Progress in Photovoltaics: Research and Applications, 29, pp. 401-413.
- Wang A; Chang NL; Sun K; Xue C; Egan RJ; Li J; Yan C; Huang J; Rong H; Ramsden C; Hao X, 2021, 'Analysis of manufacturing cost and market niches for Cu2ZnSnS4(CZTS) solar cells', Sustainable Energy and Fuels, 5, pp. 1044-1058.

=== Book Chapters ===
Tansley TL; Egan RJ, 1993, 'Defects, optical absorption and electron mobility in indium and gallium nitrides', in Wide-Band-Gap Semiconductors, Elsevier, pp. 190 - 198, http://dx.doi.org/10.1016/b978-0-444-81573-6.50031-1 -

== Awards ==
- 2022 - Australian Solar Hall of Fame.
- 2020 - Fellow of the Australian Academy of Sciences, Technology and Engineering.
- 2017 - Eight great women in the science and business of solar
