= Kay Blades =

- Known for: First Nations and Water rights advocacy

Kay Blades FTSE is an Australian Aboriginal water rights advocate, who was elected as a member of the Australian Academy of Technological Sciences and Engineering in 2026.

== Early life and education ==
Blades is a Mandandanji women, and a descendant of the Weribone family from Southwestern Queensland. She grew up on the banks of the Balonne River, and her motivation for her work in water conservation and advocacy is influenced by her connection to the Balonne River, in addition to a desire and obligation to Look After Country.

== Career ==
Blades is an advocate for First Nations water rights, including advocacy for water rights in the northern Murray-Darling Basin. From 2019 to 2024, Blades was a member of the Research Ethics Committee for the Australian Institute of Aboriginal and Torres Strait Islander Studies.

After her retirement in 2023, Blades focussed on combining Indigenous knowledge with environmental projects. She was the interim chair of Aboriginal and Torres Strait Islander Water Interests Committee, and comment that funding for Murray Darling Basins cultural flows will:

"support ownership and management of water for cultural, spiritual, social and environmental and economic outcomes".

Blades is a member of the Murray-Darling Basin Authority Cultural Advisory Group, and a Director of the Murray-Darling Basin Aboriginal Water Entitlements Program.This program aimed to empower First Nations communities by improving access and availability to surface water entitlements along the Murray Darling Basin. Blades guided a five phase project "Incorporating First Nations Land Management into technocal approaches to water modelling. She is chair of the Committee on Aboriginal and Torres Straight Islanders Interests (CAWI).

Blades was a speaker at World Water Week in 2025 held in Stockholm, with the goal of creating collaboration around the world, addressing the crises impacting groundwater in many areas around the world. The event highlighted the need to raise the importance of groundwater to livelihoods, particularly of Indigenous people, as well as food security and community health. 2025 was the first World Water Week to feature Indigenous leaders, including from Australia, Scandinavia and Canada. Blades commented, while at the World Water Week, that '"nothing about us without us" should be the standard for including indigenous communities in water decision making'.

== Awards ==
- 2026 - Fellow of the Australian Academy of Technological Sciences and Engineering.
- 2024 - ‘Aboriginal and Torres Strait Islander Knowledge and Practice in Waterway Management’. River Basin Management Society’s Awards Gala, Runners Up.
