= Branko Celler =

Australian academic

Branko Celler is an Australian academic at the University of New South Wales. In 2010 and 2011, he was Executive Dean of the College of Health and Science at the University of Western Sydney, and was then in a number of senior positions with the Australian Commonwealth Scientific and Industrial Research Organisation (CSIRO) at Epping (Sydney), NSW, from 2011 to 2014.

He was appointed a Fellow of the Institute of Electrical and Electronics Engineers (FIEEE) in 2014 for contributions to telehealth services for the management of chronic disease.

He was elected a Fellow of the Australian Academy of Technological Sciences and Engineering (FTSE) in 2012, and is a Fellow of the Institute of Engineers (Australia) (FIEAust).
