= Sarah McSwiney =

- Education: RMIT
- Occupation: Head of Engineering.
- Employer: Jetstar Airways
- Known for: Aerospace Engineering

Sarah McSwiney FTSE is an Australian aerospace engineer, who was made a fellow of the Australian Academy of Technological Sciences and Engineering in 2025. She is head of Engineering at Jetstar Airways and has a passion for supporting young women in the Aerospace and Aviation industry, and supporter of gender equity.

== Education ==
McSwiney attended Kilvington Grammar and graduated in 1999. She graduated with a Bachelor of Aerospace Engineering (hons), as well as an MBA.

== Career ==
McSwiney was a design engineer and liaison engineer in Seattle (USA) and Melbourne. She worked with Boeing for 17 years, including as leading the liaison engineering team across Boeing Australia, and then subsequently the Senior Manager of Engineering Strategy and Operations.

McSwiney was Chair of Kilvington Board, as well as holding a number of Board positions, including Chair of the Aviation/Aeorspace Australia. She is also the Chair of the Sir Lawrence Wackett Defence as well as Chair of the Aerospace Centre advisory board at RMIT.

== Gender Equity ==
McSwiney has a passion for encouraging young women and girls to pursue careers in STEM, and encouraging gender equity, which was first sparked while she was a primary school student at Kilvington school, at the robotics program.

"I remember being so fascinated and curious about the robots and their possibilities to solve problems. Importantly, the teacher at the time really urged me to explore my interest further. Without that encouragement, I'm not sure I would be where I am today. That is why it is so important that we create the pathways and opportunities for girls and young women to consider careers in the STEM sector."

McSwiney started the gender equity program, ‘GreenSkies’ as part of the Women in Aviation / Aerospace Australia, to address challenges with attracting and retaining women and girls to the aerospace industry.

== Awards ==
- 2025 - Fellow of the Australian Academy of Technological Sciences and Engineering.
- 2020 - Women in Industry - Social Leader of the Year.
