= Yan Zhuge =

Structural engineer

Yan Zhuge FTSE
- Occupations: Academic, structural engineer, and author

Academic background
- Education: BEng in Civil Engineering; MEng in Structural Engineering; Ph.D. in Structural Engineering
- Alma mater: Beijing University of Civil Engineering and Architecture; Queensland University of Technology

Academic work
- Institutions: University of South Australia (UniSA)

Yan Zhuge is an academic, structural engineer, and author. She is a professor of Structural Engineering and the professorial lead of Research Education at the University of South Australia (UniSA).

Zhuge's research centers on transforming industrial waste into sustainable, high-value construction materials focused on achieving net-zero emissions. She is a fellow of the Australian Academy of Technological Sciences & Engineering.

== Education ==
Zhuge completed her Bachelor of Engineering in Civil Engineering and a Master of Engineering in Structural Engineering from the Beijing University of Civil Engineering and Architecture. She later earned a Doctor of Philosophy in Structural Engineering from the Queensland University of Technology.

== Career ==
Zhuge worked at the University of South Australia as a lecturer in Civil Engineering from 1996 to 1999 and was later employed as a senior lecturer between 2000 and 2008. In the following year, she became a senior lecturer at the University of Southern Queensland, a position she held until 2011. From 2012 to 2016, she was an associate professor there. Since 2017, she has been a professor of Structural Engineering and has also been working as a professorial lead of Research Education since 2022 at UniSA.

== Research ==
Zhuge's research work has focused on developing sustainable concrete materials, fibre composites, and exploring structural applications for durability and environmental impact. She explored permeable concrete mix designs, identifying compositions that enhanced both structural strength and permeability. In collaboration with Lian and Beecham, she presented a new model based on Griffith's theory and demonstrated that porosity influences the strength of porous concrete.

Zhuge examined optimization techniques for fiber composite structures in civil engineering. She also studied the mechanical properties of waste tyre rubber concrete. Moreover, she reviewed landfill waste recycling in construction, examining global waste generation, performance, applications, and future frameworks to improve the reuse of tyres, plastics, and glass for sustainability.

As chief investigator, Zhuge has worked on research projects, including an investigation focused on vehicle intrusions into masonry walls, where she developed mitigation strategies using auxetic composites and vibration isolation for improved safety. In another research project, she converted carbon waste from hydrogen production into durable concrete using AI-assisted nanoscience.

== Awards and honors ==
- 2012 – Fellowship Award, Queensland International
- 2013-2014 – Research Leadership Development Program (RLDP) Award, University of Southern Queensland
- 2018 – South Australia Winnovation Award, Women in Innovation (WINN)
- 2024 – Fellow, Australian Academy of Technological Sciences & Engineering
- 2024 – Fellow, Engineers Australia

== Bibliography ==
=== Books ===
- Al-Gemeel, Ali; Zhuge, Yan (2018). Properties and Applications of Fibre Reinforced Cementitious Composite. LAP LAMBERT Academic Publishing. ISBN 978-613-9-92226-0.
- Ghadiri, Seyed Mohammadreza; Zhuge, Yan (2024). Urban Construction and Management Engineering IV. CRC Press. ISBN 978-1-040-04269-4.

=== Selected articles ===
- Thambiratnam, David; Zhuge, Yan (1996). "Dynamic analysis of beams on an elastic foundation subjected to moving loads". Journal of Sound and Vibration. 198 (2): 149–169. Bibcode:1996JSV...198..149T. doi:10.1006/jsvi.1996.0562.
- Lian, Chun; Zhuge, Yan (2010). "Optimum mix design of enhanced permeable concrete–an experimental investigation". Construction and Building Materials. 24 (12): 2664–2671. doi:10.1016/j.conbuildmat.2010.04.057.
- Ferdous, Wahid; Manalo, Allan; Siddique, Rafat; Mendis, Priyan; Zhuge, Yan; Wong, Hong S.; Lokuge, Weena; Aravinthan, Thiru; Schubel, Peter (2021). "Recycling of landfill wastes (tyres, plastics and glass) in construction–A review on global waste generation, performance, application and future opportunities". Resources, Conservation and Recycling. 173 105745. Bibcode:2021RCR...17305745F. doi:10.1016/j.resconrec.2021.105745. hdl:10044/1/90390.
- Yan, Zitong; Zeng, Jun-Jie; Zhuge, Yan; Liao, JinJing; Zhou, Jie-Kai; Ma, Guowei (2024). "Compressive behavior of FRP-confined 3D printed ultra-high performance concrete cylinders". Journal of Building Engineering. 83 108304. doi:10.1016/j.jobe.2023.108304. hdl:11541.2/37373.
- Sun, Hou-Qi; Zeng, Jun-Jie; Hong, Guang-Yao; Zhuge, Yan; Liu, Yue; Zhang, Yamei (2025). "3D-printed functionally graded concrete plates: Concept and bending behavior". Engineering Structures. 327 119551. Bibcode:2025EngSt.32719551S. doi:10.1016/j.engstruct.2024.119551. hdl:11541.2/41450.
