= Skipp Williamson =

Australian business executive and entrepreneur

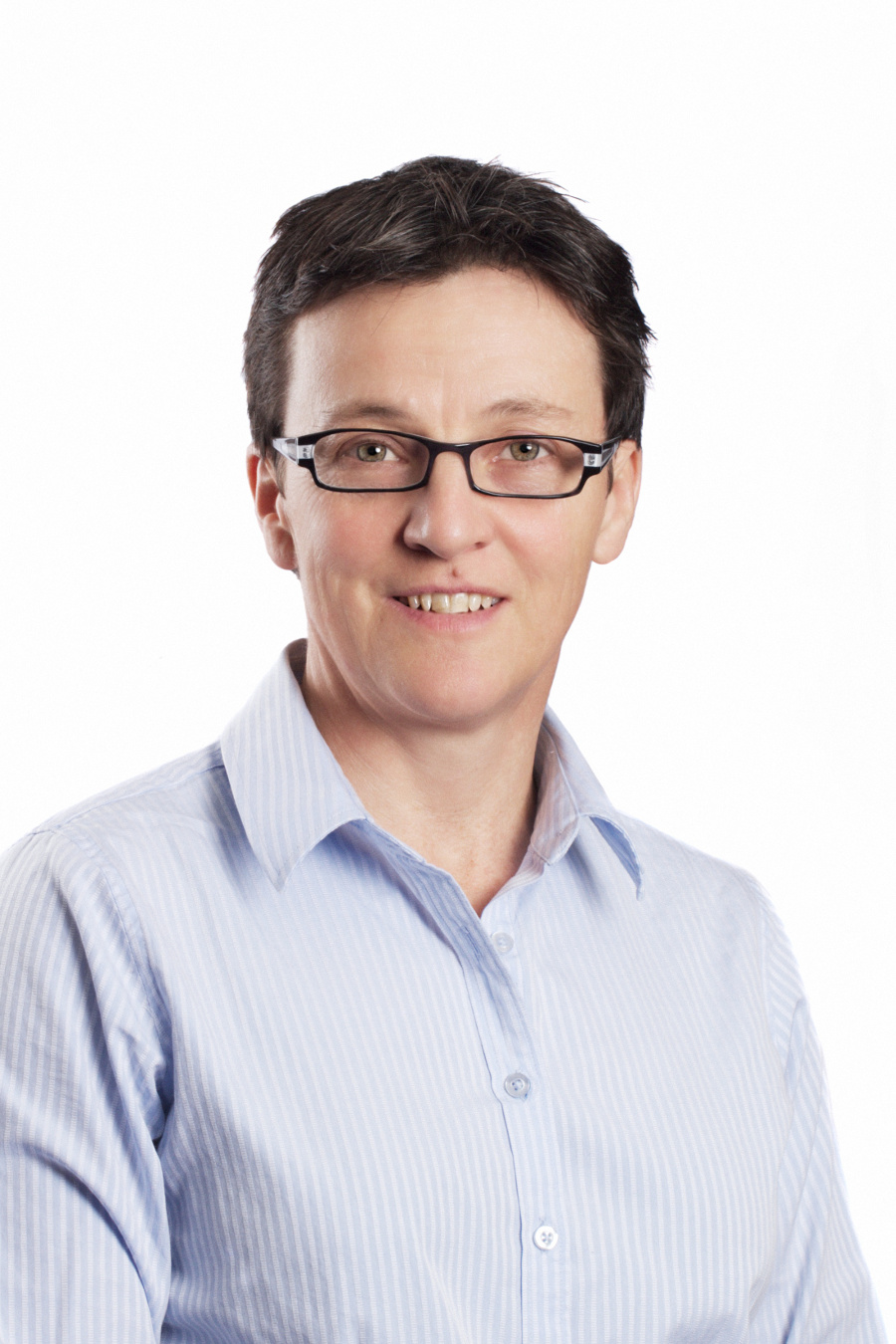
Skipp Williamson in 2013

Skipp Anne Haynes Williamson is an Australian businesswoman and founder of Partners in Performance, a management consulting firm specialising in business improvement.

== Early life and education ==
Williamson holds a Bachelor of Engineering from the University of Auckland, Master of Engineering from MIT and Master of Philosophy from the University of Oxford.

== Career ==
After leaving McKinsey & Company, in 1998 Williamson launched Partners in Performance. The company is headquartered in Sydney, Australia, but their first engagement was in the UK.

In May 2024, Accenture announced that it had agreed to purchase Partners in Performance, with the approximately 400 staff to fall under the Accenture Strategy practice.

== Recognition and memberships ==
In 2019, Williamson was named number one most powerful consultant in Australia by the Australian Financial Review Power list. In 2018, she was named Australia's third most influential consultant, and in 2017 she was named in the Australian Financial Review and Westpac Group 100 Women of Influence awards.

She is a public supporter of LGBTI rights, and in 2016 was listed in the "top 50 LGBTI" executives in Australia.

Williamson is a Fellow of the Australian Academy of Technology and Engineering and a member of Chief Executive Women.
