= Karin Verspoor =

Researcher in AI and Health Technologies

- Occupation: Dean of School of Computing Technologies
- Employer: RMIT
- Known for: AI and biological discoveries
- Title: Professor
- Website: https://www.rmit.edu.au/profiles/v/karin-verspoor

Karin M Verspoor or Cornelia Verspoor is a researcher in AI and Health Technologies, at RMIT, a Fellow of the Australian Academy of Technology and Engineering (ATSE), and a Fellow of the Australasian Institute of Digital Health. Professor Verspoor was the executive dean of RMIT School of Computing, and researches ChatGPT, generative AI and digital health, applying AI methods to interpret clinical and biological data. She was Dean of the School of Computing Technologies at RMIT as at 2025.

== Education and early life ==
Verspoor was born in West Africa to Dutch parents, and lived as a child in the USA. She was a graduate of the first class of the Thomas Jefferson High School for Science and Technology in 1989. She received a Bachelor of Arts from Rice University in Houston, with a double major in Computer Science and Cognitive Sciences. She then received a Masters and PhD at the University of Edinburgh in Cognitive Science and Natural Language, in the UK. She subsequently moved to Australia and worked as a Research Fellow at the Microsoft Research Institute at Macquarie University in Sydney in 1997-1998.

Verspoor worked for five years at Los Alamos National Laboratory, as well as in US start-ups during the Tech Bubble. From 2012–2014 she was an Honorary Research Fellow, at the University of Melbourne, an Associate Professor, and Professor from 2014 to 2016, and 2017 to 2021 respectively. From 2021 she was the Executive Dean of the School of Computing Technologies, at RMIT University.

== Career ==
Verspoor specialises in research in Digital health, and is a fellow of the Australasian Institute of Digital Health. Her research involves using Natural Language Processing (NLP) to convert text and unstructured data into useful and actionable information in the field of biomedicine.

She commented on being a woman in AI and the 2022 Women in AI awards,

“I’ve been a woman in AI for nearly 31 years. Starting when I was an undergraduate computer science student. I was drawn to AI because I was fascinated by our human ability to understand language, and I saw AI as a way for us to gain insight into how language works through computational models.”

Verspoor is the director of with BioGrid Australia and she was a co-founder of the Australian Alliance for Artificial Intelligence in Healthcare.

== Women in STEM ==
Verspoor has published on how to keep girls in STEM and IT at schools, describing how many girls and young women are not receiving the best possible computer processing and IT skills, due to opt-in training, as well as gender stereotyping of toys and gadgets. She has also written about reasons why women are less likely to code, and how to improve coding as a career path for women.

== AI Commentary ==
Since the release of ChatGPT, Verspoor has published several public articles related to AI. These include an article about AI in healthcare, the potential hazards of AI Scientists, and a commentary about a paper aiming to combat LLM confabulations with another LLM.

== Publications ==
Verspoor has over 13,000 citations as at April 2025, and an H index of 53. Select publications include the following:

- Radivojac, P., Clark, W., Oron, T. et al. (2013)A large-scale evaluation of computational protein function prediction. Nat Methods 10, 221–227 . https://doi.org/10.1038/nmeth.2340
- Verspoor, K., Cohen, K.B., Lanfranchi, A. et al. (2012) A corpus of full-text journal articles is a robust evaluation tool for revealing differences in performance of biomedical natural language processing tools. BMC Bioinformatics 13, 207 . A corpus of full-text journal articles is a robust evaluation tool for revealing differences in performance of biomedical natural language processing tools.
- Nguyen, D.Q., Verspoor, K. (2019). End-to-End Neural Relation Extraction Using Deep Biaffine Attention. In: Azzopardi, L., et al. (eds) Advances in Information Retrieval. ECIR 2019. Lecture Notes in Computer Science(), vol 11437. Springer, Cham. End-to-End Neural Relation Extraction Using Deep Biaffine Attention.
- Verspoor, K., Cohn, J., Mniszewski, S. and Joslyn, C. (2006), A categorization approach to automated ontological function annotation. Protein Science, 15: 1544-1549. A categorization approach to automated ontological function annotation.

== Awards ==
- 2024 - Fellow of the Australian Academy of Technological Sciences and Engineering.
- 2022 – Finalist – Women in AI Australia/New Zealand, for "AI in Innovation".
- 2021 – Telstra Health – Brilliant Woman in Digital Health.
- 2019 – Digital Health CRC – Digital and Data Health Innovation Award.
