= Karen Dobson =

Australian chemical engineer and Entrepreneur

- Education: University of Melbourne
- Occupation: Managing Director
- Employer(s): Dow Australia and New Zealand
- Known for: water scarcity, circular economy

Karen Dobson FTSE is an Australian chemical engineer, managing director of Dow Australia and New Zealand. She was elected a fellow of the Australian Academy of Technological Sciences and Engineering in 2024.

== Education ==
Dobson was awarded a Bachelor of Chemical Engineering from University of Melbourne, Australia.

== Career ==
Dobson started at Dow, as an engineer in 1987, and then moved to Hong Kong in 1992, as Asia Pacific technical leader. She then moved to Minneapolis, USA as global marketing director for FILMTEC Membranes. Dobson subsequently moved to Shanghai for Dow Asia Pacific, and relocated to Melbourne Australia in 2014.

Early in her career Dobson gained experience both designing and implementing reverse osmosis, with the goal of reducing costs around water desalination, for both municipalities and industry.

Dobson spent much of her career advocating for advanced manufacturing within Australia, collaborating with and influencing government, university researchers and industry around climate change, the circular economy and water scarcity. In more recent years, Dobson has been passionate about best practice environmental techniques, improve the use and recycling of plastics. She has also advocated for recycling technology and investment in commercial improvements in recycling.

Dobson is a director of the Business Council of Australia, and Chemistry Australia.

Dobson is also an advisory board member at the University of Queensland's Dow Centre for Sustainable Engineering, and a council member of the Royal Institution of Australia.

== Awards ==
- 2024 – Kernot Memorial Medal.
- 2024 – Fellow of the Australian Academy of Technological Sciences and Engineering.
