= Anna Giacomini =

Civil engineer

- Education: University of Parma
- Employer: University of NewCastle
- Known for: Civil Engineering
- Title: Professor

Anna Giacomini is an Italian civil engineer, a fellow of the Australian Academy of Technological Sciences and Engineering in 2023, and a professor at the University of Newcastle.

== Education ==
Giacomini has 20 years of experience in Rock Mechanics and Civil Engineering. She was awarded a PhD from the University of Parma, Italy, in 2003. In 2007 she joined the University of Newcastle as a research academic. Giacomini with a research background in rockfall analysis and rock mechanics, applied to mining within the Australian landscape. She was the principal researcher of an Australian Research Council Linkage Project from 2009 to 2011, Giacomini played a role in developing barrier designs aimed at safeguarding infrastructure such as roads and railways from rockfall hazards.

== Career ==
Giacomini is a professor at the University of Newcastle, in NSW, Australia. Gioacomini works in the field of rock mechanics and rockfall analyses. She has served as editorial board member of four International Journals in the field of civil engineering, as reviewer for several national and international funding bodies in the rock mechanics and engineering fields. She is also a member of the ARC College of Experts. Her work was described, after winning the Booker prize from the Australian Academy of Science, in 2019, as:

"...significantly improved safety within the Australian mining industry, where rockfalls threaten human lives, the portal structures for underground entry, and damage to machinery."

Giacomini is one of the co-founders of the HunterWISE - Women in STEM program.

== Publications ==
Giacomini has published over 150 scientific works, with an H index of 27 in 2023. The following are select publications:

- GP Giani, A Giacomini, M Migliazza, A Segalini (2004) Experimental and theoretical studies to improve rock fall analysis and protection work design. Rock Mechanics and Rock Engineering 37, 369-389 https://doi.org/10.1016/j.ijrmms.2008.09.007
- A Giacomini, O Buzzi, B Renard, GP Giani (2009) Experimental studies on fragmentation of rock falls on impact with rock surfaces. International Journal of Rock Mechanics and Mining Sciences: 46:(4)708-715. https://doi.org/10.1016/j.ijrmms.2008.09.007
- K Thoeni, A Giacomini, C Lambert, S W Sloan, J P Carter (2014) A 3D discrete element modelling approach for rockfall analysis with drapery systems. International Journal of Rock Mechanics and Mining Sciences. 68:107-119. https://doi.org/10.1016/j.ijrmms.2014.02.008

== Awards ==
- 2023 - Fellow of the Australian Academy of Technological Sciences and Engineering.
- 2022 - Prize for Excellence in Engineering or Information and Communications Technology, NSW Premier's Prizes for Science & Engineering.
- 2019 - John Booker Medal from the Australian Academy of Science.
- 2019 - Best Practice Industry Engagement Award, received from the Newcastle Institute for Energy and Resources.
- 2018 - Vice Chancellor's Award for Research Supervisor of the year.
