= Deborah Rathjen =

Australian scientist

Deborah A. Rathjen is an Australian scientist who is the executive chair and CEO of biOasis Technologies. She was previously head of Bionomics Incorporated. She is experienced in developing and managing biotechnology organisations.

== Career ==
Deborah Rathjen has a Bachelor of Science from Flinders University and a PhD in immunology from Macquarie University.

She was employed as manager, business development and licensing for the Peptech Group until 2000, when she resigned to join Bionomics in 2000. In 2016, she was assigned a term role in The Prime Minister's Science Engineering and Innovation Council and the Federal Government's Innovation and Science Australia's Biomedical Translation Fund Committee for a six-year term. Also in 2016 Rathjen was appointed an inaugural member of the Australian Medical Research Advisory Board, the body chaired by Professor Ian Frazer which advises the Medical Research Future Fund and is a board member of the Australian National Fabrication Facility.

Rathjen moved from Bionomics to biOasis Technologies where, in 2019, she is executive chair and CEO.

In April 2019 she was appointed to the Million Minds Mission Advisory Panel.

== Awards and recognition ==
- Fellow, Australian Academy of Technology and Engineering, 2007
- Winner, Person of the Year, BioSpectrum Asia Pacific Awards, 2013
- Specially elected Fellow of the Australian Academy of Science, 2026
