= Rebecca Gravina =

- Education: University of Adelaide (PhD)
- Occupations: Structural engineer and academic
- Employer: University of Queensland
- Title: Professor

Rebecca Gravina FTSE, is a structural engineer, the TMR Chair in structural engineering at the University of Queensland and was elected a Fellow of the Australian Academy of Technological Sciences and Engineering in 2026.

== Education ==
Gravina was awarded a PhD in structural engineering from the University of Adelaide, titled "Non-linear overload behaviour and ductility of reinforced concrete flexural members containing 500 MPa grade reinforcing steel".

== Career ==
Gravina's research and career has focussed on the performance over long time periods of reinforced concrete, and the durability and sustainability of prestressed concrete, as well as rehabilitation of previously built structures using polymers called Fibre Reinforced Polymers (FRP). She has conducted research on recycled materials in concrete. She is editor in chief for the journal Australian Journal of Civil Engineering, and also is a Member of the Concrete Institute of Australia. She is Immediate president of the American Society of Civil Engineers – Australian section.

Gravina is also an honorary professor at RMIT University, in Victoria, Australia.

== Media ==
Gravina has spoken to the ABC news print media about the stresses and deformations which occur in concrete bridges.

== Publications ==
Gravina has over 100 publications on topics such as concrete fatigue, waste water from concrete, durability and structural integrity of different types of concrete. Her H-index is 37 and she has over 5000 citations, as at October 2026. Select publications include:

- Venkatesan, S., Zhang, J., Law, D., Gravina, R., & Navaratnam, S. (2024). Application of Recycled Cardboard to Construction Based on Life Cycle Assessment. Sustainability, 16(19), 8386. https://doi.org/10.3390/su16198386.
- Lin, X., Gravina, R.J. An effective numerical model for reinforced concrete beams strengthened with high performance fibre reinforced cementitious composites. Mater Struct 50, 212 (2017). https://doi.org/10.1617/s11527-017-1085-8.

Gravina also published the book Prestressed Concrete, with co-authors Robert Warner, Stephen Forster and Andrew Kilpatrick, published by Pearson.

== Awards and recognition ==
- 2026 – Fellow of the Australian Academy of Technological Sciences & Engineering
- 2017 – Vice Chancellor's Award for Research Excellence: Team award. Civil Infrastructure Management Research Unit
