= Amanda Ellis =

New Zealand diplomat

Amanda Ellis leads Global Partnerships for the Julie Ann Wrigley Global Futures Laboratory at Arizona State University and co-chairs WE Empower United Nations Sustainable Development Goal (SDG) Challenge. She previously served as an ambassador to the United Nations from New Zealand and the New Zealand Deputy Secretary for International Development. She received the TIAW Lifetime Achievement Award for her work related to empowering women in the economy.

== Education ==
For executive education, Ellis attended INSEAD, Stanford Graduate School of Business, Harvard Kennedy School and Harvard Business School. From the University of Hawaiʻi at Mānoa, she earned a MA in communication and political science. Her BA is from the University of Otago with degrees in French and Economics and her MBA is from Australian Graduate School of Management.

== Awards ==
- TIAW Lifetime Achievement Award
- East-West Center Distinguished Alumni Award
- Columba College Distinguished Alumna Award
- NZ Business Hall of Fame
