= Juliet Willetts =

- Education: University of New South Wales
- Occupation: Research Director
- Employer: University of Technology Sydney
- Known for: Inclusive water advocacy
- Title: Professor
- Website: https://profiles.uts.edu.au/Juliet.Willetts

Juliet Willetts is a researcher in water advocacy and sanitation issues, Professor and Research Director of the Institute for Sustainable Futures at the University of Technology, Sydney. She was recognised as a Fellow of the Australian Academy of Technology in 2025.

== Early life and education ==
Willetts was motivated to work in sanitation and water control after a family trip to India at the age of 12. She was living close to an informal settlement, with people living in and near to drain pipes, with poor sanitation, which inspired her to pursue a career in sanitation and water.

Willetts has a Bachelor of Science from the University of Sydney, a Bachelor of Engineering (honours), also from the University of Sydney, and a PhD from the University of New South Wales, the latter for her thesis "Thermophilic decolourisation of textile dye wastewater".

== Career ==
Willetts is a water researcher, and adviser in international development aid, in the field of water research. She works in the intersection of policy and practice, around human rights, sanitation and water. Her experience also involves sustainability, gender equality, as well as monitoring and evaluation of water and sanitation issues. She served on the Steering Committee of Australian Council for International Development (ACFID), as well as the Network for University and Executive Committee Reference Group for Water, Sanitation and Hygiene.

Willetts is the Research Director at the University of Sydney's Institute for Sustainable Futures.

== Publications ==
Willetts has more than 150 peer-reviewed publications, as at September 2025, an H number of 34, and over 4000 citations. Select publications include:

- Carrard, N., Foster, T., & Willetts, J. (2019). Groundwater as a Source of Drinking Water in Southeast Asia and the Pacific: A Multi-Country Review of Current Reliance and Resource Concerns. Water, 11(8), 1605. https://doi.org/10.3390/w11081605.
- G. Howard et al.; COVID-19: urgent actions, critical reflections and future relevance of 'WaSH': lessons for the current and future pandemics. J Water Health 1 October 2020; 18 (5): 613–630. doi: https://doi.org/10.2166/wh.2020.162.
- Willetts, J., & Crawford, P. (2007). The most significant lessons about the Most Significant Change technique. Development in Practice, 17(3), 367–379. https://doi.org/10.1080/09614520701336907.

== Media ==
Willet has published numerous articles in The Conversation, on topics such as responses to natural disasters in Vanuatu, after Cyclone Pam, life without a toilet and the impact of living without a toilet, and World Toilet Day. She has also published on cuts to international aid, and evidence based approaches to international aid.

== Awards ==
- 2025 - Fellow of the Australian Academy of Technological Sciences and Engineering.
- 2024 - International Water Association Gender, Diversity in Water Award.
- 2024 - Australian Financial Review's '100 Women of Influence' - finalist.
- 2014 - National Australia Bank - Women's Leadership awards.
- 2012 - UTS Human Rights Award.
