= Jane MacMaster =

Australian engineer

- Education: University of Sydney
- Occupation: Chief Engineer
- Employer: Engineers Australia

Jane MacMaster is a mechanical, aerospace and systems design engineer, and was Chief Engineer of Engineering Australia from 2020 to 2024.

== Education ==
MacMaster has a Bachelor of Engineering from Sydney University, graduating in 1993, with first class honours. She also has a Master of Arts in International Relations, from Deakin University (2010), is a graduate of the Australian Institute of Company Directors (2024).

== Career ==
MacMaster is a mechanical, aerospace, systems design engineer, working across the whole engineering lifecycle, design and systems engineering.

MacMaster is also a mentor for Science Technology Australia women in STEM programs.

MacMaster is also a director on the Board of the Australian Council of Professions. MacMaster has written about engineering in education.

== Recognition & awards ==
2023 - Fellow, Australian Academy of Technological Sciences and Engineering.

2017 - Fellow, Institution of Engineers Australia.

1993 - University Medal, Mechanical Engineering, University of Sydney.
