= Lara Olsen =

Chemical engineer

- Education: University of Melbourne
- Occupation: Managing Director
- Employer: South East Water
- Known for: Sustainability Technology

Lara Olsen is an Australian chemical engineer and sustainable technology leader. She works in delivering climate change solutions, and the managing director of South East Water, in Australia. She was recognised as a Fellow of the Australian Academy of Technological Sciences and Engineering in 2023 and worked on the Big Battery in Hornsdale, an industrial scale renewable energy battery in South Australia.

== Education ==
Olsen has a Bachelor of Arts and Bachelor of Engineering in Chemical Engineering and Japanese from University of Melbourne in 1999 and a Master of Business Administration from INSEAD in 2004.

Olsen graduated with a Bachelor Arts/Engineering (hons) from the University of Melbourne and Tokyo University of Technology, in 1999. where she was on the Deans Honours List. Awarded a John Monash Scholarship, she has also completed an MBA.

== Career ==
Olsen was the Regional Manager- Business Development for Tesla Energy, Asia Pacific. At Tesla, Olsen was responsible for developing and extending Tesla Energy's commercial and grid-scale storage business in Australia, New Zealand, and the neighbouring regional markets. Prior to this, Olsen was Head of Strategy at CitiPower, Powercor and Head of Strategy at the Australian Renewable Energy Agency (ARENA). Olsen was also the head of the big battery project, Hornsdale Power Reserve, South Australia.

Olsen's leadership roles include strategy around renewables, including at ARENA, as well as Tesla Energy, in the United States.

Olsen has provided keynote addresses on water and sustainable management, in the UK. She has worked in a number of gender equity, inclusion and diversity programs in engineering and technology across industry and high school.

== Awards ==
- 2023 - ATSE - Fellow.
