= Angeline Achariya =

- Education: PhD, University of Melbourne
- Occupations: Chair and Board roles
- Known for: Sustainable Agribusiness
- Title: Dr

Angeline Achariya FTSE is an Australian Agrifood executive leader, a fellow of the Australian Academy of Technology Science and Enginerering, and was inducted to the 2025 Victoria Women's honour roll as a Trailblazer.

== Education ==
Achariya has a Bachelor of Science (honours) in Food Technology, from Victoria University, a PhD from the University of Melbourne, a Graduate Certificate in Food Business Management from Monash University. She is also a graduate of the Australian Institute of Company Directors.

Achariya spent her early career working in the dairy industry, and often was the sole women in many meetings, along with the challenges of being heard.

== Career ==
Achariya works in the agrifood sector, in the field of agricultural production and food manufacturing. was appointed to the board of Industry, Innovation and Science Australia, in March 2025. She has been involved in the commercialisation of more than 1200 innovations across the world, in the field of value added products, as well as improving and creating business models through innovation.

Achariya was a founder of the Food Innovation Centre, located at Monash University She is also the Chair of the Australian Chapter of G100 Mission Million for Food systems, which is an organisation in the agrifood sector leading an equitable approach to empowerment. She has also been an advisor to Beanstalk Agtech. Achariya has had leadership and governance roles across the Wine Australia Board, Victoria's Multicultural Business Minsterial Council, and the Australia China Business Council of Victorian Agribusiness Forum.

Achariya has been a director of the Economic Accelerator of Australia, as well as the CEO of Innovation GameChangers. She was appointed a member of the Industry and Innovation and Science Australia board in 2025.

== Women in STEM ==
Achariya has spent much time advocating for women in STEM, and been interviewed on challenges and solutions for attracting and retaining women in STEM, including building capabilities, strategies for creating diverse environments, and asking what are the statistics on the gender diversity in the company, where are they starting from and where do they want to be. She described how

'support was needed from every stage of the system, from government, from industry, from companies, and from educators to encourage diversity', which needs to be a continual process, rather than a one-off step.

== Awards ==
- 2026 - Top 99 Global AgriFood Women Leaders, The FoodCons 99+ List
- 2025 - Superstar of STEM.
- 2025 - Top 99 Global AgriFood Tech Leaders, The FoodCons 99+ List
- 2025 - Women of Colour in STEM awards - Winner, Leadership .
- 2025 - Victorian honour roll of women.
- 2024 - Fellow of the Australian Academy of Technological Sciences and Engineering.
- 2024 - Women of the Decade.
