= Pep Canadell =

Catalan-Australian scientist

- Born: 1961 (age 64–65); Sabadell, Catalonia, Spain
- Education: Universitat Autònoma de Barcelona (BSc, MSc, PhD)
- Known for: Global carbon budgets, carbon-cycle synthesis
- Awards: CSIRO Newton Turner Career Award (2014)
- Scientific career
- Fields: Climate science, Ecology, Biogeochemistry
- Workplaces: CSIRO, Global Carbon Project
- Website: https://people.csiro.au/C/P/Pep-Canadell

Josep "Pep" Canadell i Gili (born 1961) is a Catalan-Australian scientist specialising in climate science, ecology, and biogeochemistry. He is a Chief Research Scientist at the Commonwealth Scientific and Industrial Research Organisation (CSIRO), Chief Lead Investigator in the Climate Systems Hub of Australia's National Environmental Science Program (NESP), and Executive Director of the Global Carbon Project. He is a fellow of major scientific societies including the American Geophysical Union, the Australian Academy of Science, the Australian Academy of Technological Sciences and Engineering, the Royal Academy of Science and Arts of Barcelona and the Institute of Catalan Studies. His research emphasises quantification of greenhouse gas budgets and pathways to climate mitigation. In 2021, Reuters ranked him the eighth most influential climate scientist in the world.

Canadell has contributed as a lead author to the Nobel Peace Prize-winning Intergovernmental Panel on Climate Change (IPCC) assessment reports and has participated in multiple assessments by the World Meteorological Organisation.

== Early life and education ==
Canadell was born in Sabadell, Catalonia, Spain, in 1961. He earned a Bachelor of Science (1984), a Master of Science in Ecology (1989), and a Ph.D. in fire ecology (1995) from the Universitat Autònoma de Barcelona.

During his postgraduate period, he worked as a specialist technician with the Catalonian Department of Environment on a forest watershed biogeochemistry project. He held teaching roles at the Universitat Autònoma de Barcelona as Assistant Professor and later Field and Laboratory Assistant Professor while completing his masters and doctoral research.

== Academic and research career ==
=== Postdoctoral research and early U.S. appointments ===
From 1991 to 1992, Canadell worked at San Diego State University as lecturer and adjunct professor. He subsequently held a research associate post at the University of California, Berkeley (1993–1994). In 1995 he joined Stanford University, where he served as research associate and scientific officer for the Global Change and Terrestrial Ecosystems (GCTE) programme of the International Geosphere–Biosphere Programme (IGBP).

During this period, he co-authored studies on global vegetation rooting depth, describing root distributions across biomes and implications for carbon and water cycles.

=== Career in Australia and global carbon work ===
Canadell relocated to Canberra and joined CSIRO, where he is a Chief Research Scientist. Since 2001, he has directed the Global Carbon Project (GCP), an international program coordinating carbon cycle research and assessment across atmospheric, land, ocean and human systems.

==== Major research areas ====
His research covers:

- Coordination of carbon budgets (CO_{2}, CH_{4}, N_{2}O) at global, continental, and national scales
- Estimation of terrestrial carbon sinks and pools (e.g. forests, soils) and their vulnerability to climate variability, drought, and fire
- Assessment of mitigation pathways, especially land-based sequestration and methane reduction strategies
- recently returned to fire ecology, the subject of his PhD research and recent publications

== Principal contributions ==
=== Global greenhouse-gas budgets ===
As Executive Director of the Global Carbon Project (GCP), Canadell coordinates and supports the development and publication of global greenhouse gases (GHG), including the global budgets of carbon, methane, and nitrous oxide, the three major GHGs. This work is produced collaboratively by international research groups and aims to reduce uncertainties in global greenhouse gas estimates. The assessments, published every 1 to 3 years, quantifies global anthropogenic GHG emissions from fossil fuels and land-use change, agriculture, and tracks their redistribution among the atmosphere, oceans, and terrestrial ecosystems. These global GHG budgets provide reference datasets for assessing progress toward international climate targets and are used in global assessments of the IPCC and the World Meteorological Organization.

=== Carbon sources, sinks, and redistribution ===
Canadell has co-authored studies that quantify the balance between anthropogenic carbon dioxide (CO_{2}) emissions and their uptake by the planet's natural systems. His work has focused on determining how much of the CO_{2} released by human activities remains in the atmosphere versus being absorbed by terrestrial and oceanic sinks - a measure known as the "airborne fraction". These syntheses integrate atmospheric observations, ocean and land process models, and national emissions inventories to produce constrained global estimates of carbon fluxes.

Through the Global Carbon Project, Canadell and colleagues have identified patterns in how natural carbon sinks respond to changes in climate and emissions. Their analyses have shown that while oceans and terrestrial ecosystems collectively absorb roughly half of global CO_{2} emissions, the efficiency of these sinks varies from year to year due to factors such as El Niño events, droughts, and wildfire activity. This research informes international assessments and long-term projections of atmospheric CO_{2} growth, providing evidence that natural sinks play a critical but potentially vulnerable role in moderating climate change.

=== Dynamics and limits of natural sinks ===
Canadell's research has examined how the capacity of natural systems - particularly forests, soils, and oceans - to absorb carbon dioxide (CO_{2}) varies over time and under changing environmental conditions. His work, often in collaboration with international colleagues through the Global Carbon Project, has shown that these natural carbon sinks are dynamic and influenced by climate variability, land-use change, and disturbances such as drought and fire.

Analyses led by Canadell show that while terrestrial and oceanic sinks currently remove about half of human CO_{2} emissions each year, their effectiveness is not constant. For example, warming-induced increases in wildfire frequency and severity in regions such as Australia have been associated with reduced forest carbon storage capacity. Similarly, oceanic uptake is affected by temperature-driven changes in solubility and circulation. These findings have contributed to understanding feedbacks between the carbon cycle and climate, underscoring that continued emissions could weaken natural sink efficiency and accelerate atmospheric CO_{2} accumulation.

=== Integrative, policy-relevant synthesis linking carbon cycle science to mitigation pathways ===
His work includes research on how scientific understanding of the carbon cycle relates to mitigation strategies and policy frameworks. He has contributed to international assessments, including multiple reports of the IPCC, where he has served as a Coordinating Lead Author and expert reviewer on the global carbon cycle and emissions pathways.

Through the Global Carbon Project, he has contributed to research exploring how carbon-cycle science can be applied to emissions-reduction strategies. He co-developed frameworks for quantifying national and sectoral contributions to the global carbon budget, supporting transparent accounting under the Paris Agreement.

He contributes to public communication on climate science, including discussions of decarbonization and carbon management, through media outlets and public forums. He has discussed the need for large-scale deployment of renewable energy and carbon removal technologies in public and media forums, including Energy Insiders and CSIRO's outreach programs. His synthesis work is cited in discussions on how scientific evidence can guide national climate policies and global mitigation pathways.

=== Climate feedbacks, vulnerability, and adaptation ===
Canadell's work addresses interactions between the carbon cycle and climate feedbacks, and explores how natural systems may respond as warming intensifies. In an essay, he and co-authors framed a research agenda emphasizing the vulnerability of the carbon–climate system, including feedbacks and the limits of natural sinks under changing climate conditions.

Modeling studies generally predict that as climate warms, the efficiency of natural carbon sinks will decline, thereby amplifying atmospheric CO_{2} concentrations, that is a positive carbon - climate feedback.

In his research and through the Global Carbon Project, Canadell has emphasized that feedbacks resulting from weakened sinks (due to drought, increased heat stress, wildfire, or permafrost thaw) could undermine climate stabilization goals. For example, permafrost thaw is recognized as a potent feedback: warming leads to decomposition of previously frozen carbon, which adds CO_{2} to the atmosphere and further accelerates warming.

To address potential vulnerabilities, Canadell has promoted adaptation strategies in land management, such as enhancing ecosystem resilience, restoring degraded landscapes, and managing fire regimes in a way that preserves or strengthens carbon sequestration capacity even as climatic stressors increase

This integrative approach links carbon-cycle research with climate policy: it highlights that mitigation plans must consider not just emissions but the stability and responsiveness of natural sinks under future conditions.

== Key involvements ==
- Executive Director — Global Carbon Project
- Chief Research Scientist — CSIRO Environment
- Contributor to IPCC — has participated in multiple assessment cycles
- Scientific leadership — roles in research programmes including the IGBP, Future Earth, and the World Climate Research Program

== Communication of his Science ==
Canadell has published extensively in peer-reviewed journals, including work in Nature and Science. He also writes for science-focused journalism platforms (The Conversation, Scientific American and other publications) and uses social media to discuss research on greenhouse gases.

== Awards and recognition ==
- 2026 – Malaspina Award (2026), awarded by the Association of Spanish Researchers in Australia-Pacific (SRAP) and the Embassy of Spain in Canberra, in recognition of his significant contributions to climate change research and scientific cooperation between Spain and Australia.
- 2025 – Elected Fellow of the Australian Academy of Science
- 2024 – Elected Fellow of the Australian Academy of Technological Sciences and Engineering (ATSE)
- 2024 - Elected Fellow of the Royal Academy of Science and Arts Barcelona
- 2022 Elected Fellow of the Institute of Catalan Studies.
- 2021 – Ranked 8th most influential climate scientist by Reuters
- 2017 Elected Fellow of the American Geophysical Union
- Since 2017 – Highly Cited Researcher (Clarivate Analytics) according to citation metrics on CSIRO biography page
- 2018 – Prospect Think Tank Award on Energy and Environment (on behalf of GCP)
- 2014 – CSIRO Newton Turner Career Award
- 2007 – Member of IPCC team awarded the Nobel Peace Prize

== Selected publications ==
- Canadell JG, Le Quéré C, Raupach MR, Field CB, Buitenhuis ET, Ciais P, Conway TJ, Gillett NP, Houghton RA, Marland G (2007). "Contributions to accelerating atmospheric CO_{2} growth from economic activity, carbon intensity, and efficiency of natural sinks." Proceedings of the National Academy of Sciences 104: 18866–18870.
- Canadell J, Jackson RB, Ehleringer JR, Mooney HA, Sala OE, Schulze E-D (1996). "Maximum rooting depth of vegetation types at the global scale." Oecologia 108: 583–595.
- Canadell JG, Raupach MR (2008). "Managing Forests for Climate Change Mitigation." Science 320: 1456–1457.
- Tarnocai C, Canadell JG, Mazhitova G, Schuur EAG, Kuhry P, Zimov S (2009). "Soil organic carbon pools in the northern circumpolar permafrost region." Global Biogeochemical Cycles 23: GB2023.
- Canadell JG, Schulze E-D (2014). "Global potential of biospheric carbon management for climate mitigation." Nature Communications 5: 5282.
- Canadell JG, Meyer CP, Cook G, Dowdy A, Briggs PR, Knauer J, Pepler A, Haverd V (2021). "Multi-decadal increase of forest burned area in Australia is linked to climate change." Nature Communications 12: 6921.
