= Melita Keywood =

Environmental scientist

- Occupation: Research Scientist
- Employer: CSIRO
- Known for: Aerosol science and air quality
- Title: Dr
- Website: https://people.csiro.au/k/m/melita-keywood

Melita Keywood FTSE is the Principal Research Scientist, and Group Leader of Climate Intelligence at CSIRO, and was elected as a Fellow of the Australian Academy of Technological Sciences and Engineering in 2026.

== Education ==
Keywood received a Bachelor of Science from the University of Auckland in 1989, a Masters of Science from the University of Auckland in 1989, and a PhD from ANU in 1996.,

== Career ==
Keywoods career is based around researching aerosol microphysics, and their changes over long time periods as well as understanding chemical composition in the ocean-atmosphere boundary layer. She has worked on the science behind aerosols in urban airsheds and aerosols in vegetation smoke, including bush fires, as well as experience in developing a deeper understanding of the drivers of the marine boundary layer. Keywood has also worked in the science around the role of aerosols in cloud modulation. She has been lead scientist at the Cape Grim Atomspheric Monitoring station.

Keywood has been a scientist at CSIRO since 1996 and has led atmospheric observation programs that track changes in air quality and mechanistic causes of climate change. Her research has developed the science of particulate pollution within Victoria and NSW, Australia, providing long-term observational data from Cape Grim weather station. Data from Cape Grim is used to inform global climate and environmental assessments, and to determine long-term changes in atmospheric composition, including CO2 concentrations.

Keywood has worked in the fields of air quality, aerosols and climate science, in particular, aerosols and pollution, including from city pollution and bushfire smoke as well as the impacts on humans, ecosytems and the climate.

== Media ==
Keywood has been interviewed by Science Journalist Nate Byrne of the ABC on air quality testing, on the 50th anniversary of the Cape Grim Air Quality station. She has spoken about air quality from Cape Grim and impacts on human health as well as impacts of fires on global warming. She has also been interviewed for both radio and digital media for the ABC.

== Publications ==
Keywood has contributed to more than 150 publications, with an H number of 51, and over 8,000 citations as at October 2026, according to Google Scholar. Select publications include the following:

- J. J. Schauer, B. T. Mader, J. T. DeMinter, ... R. C. Flagan, R. A. Cary, D. Smith, B. J. Huebert, T. Bertram, S. ... Keywood; ACE-Asia Intercomparison of a Thermal-Optical Method for the Determination of Particle-Phase Organic and Elemental Carbon. Environ. Sci. Technol. 1 March 2003; 37 (5): 993–1001. https://doi.org/10.1021/es020622f
- Nga L. Ng, Jesse H. Kroll, Melita D. Keywood, Roya Bahreini, Varuntida Varutbangkul, Richard C. Flagan, John H. Seinfeld, Anita Lee, Allen H. Goldstein; Contribution of First- versus Second-Generation Products to Secondary Organic Aerosols Formed in the Oxidation of Biogenic Hydrocarbons. Environ. Sci. Technol. 1 April 2006; 40 (7): 2283–2297. https://doi.org/10.1021/es052269u.
- Keywood, M., Kanakidou, M., Stohl, A., Dentener, F., Grassi, G., Meyer, C. P., … Burrows, J. (2013). Fire in the Air: Biomass Burning Impacts in a Changing Climate. Critical Reviews in Environmental Science and Technology, 43(1), 40–83. https://doi.org/10.1080/10643389.2011.604248.

== Awards ==
- 2026 - Fellow of the Australian Academy of Technological Sciences and Engineering.
- 2019 - Werner Strauss Clean Air Achievement Award from the Clean Air Society of Australian and New Zealand.
- 2016 - Clean Air Achievement award - for making a significant contribution to achieving improvements in the quality of the air environment, Clean Air Society of Australia and New Zealand.
- 2014 - Certificate of Recognition. - Hazelwood Coal Mine Fire 2014. From the Clean Air Society of Australia and New Zealand.
- 2004 - Postdoctoral fellowship, California Institute of Technology.
