= Chamindie Punyadeera =

Biotechnologist

- Education: PhD (University of The Witwatersrand, Johannesburg)
- Occupation: Researcher
- Employer: Griffith University
- Known for: Biomedical health
- Title: Professor

Chamindie Punyadeera is a researcher at Griffith University who was selected to be a Fellow of the Australian Academy of Technology, Science and Engineering in 2023. She is a researcher in cancer and heart disease, leading a team who uses human saliva and blood as diagnostic tools for detecting heart disease and cancer early.

== Early career ==
Punyadeera was born in Sri Lanka, and was raised in Botswana. She received a Bachelor of Science from the University of Botswana, 1994, followed by a Masters of Science in 1996, and a PhD in 2000, both from the University of the Witwatersrand.

== Career ==
Punyadeera has worked as a translational scientist across biomedicine and engineering, with research experience in both industry and academia. She worked in Philips Electronics in the Netherlands, where she played a role in the development of the Philips Mini-care I-20, an invention for the detection of cardiac diseases.

Punyadeera's research also includes studies on nucleic acid detection. She contributed to the creation of an integrated platform known as Idylla TM, which was subsequently commercialized by Biocartis NV in Belgium.

Punyadeera has worked in salivary diagnostics, and her research has resulted in FDA approval for a breakthrough saliva-based testing technology in the United States. She leads a research laboratory in Australia, with a team of over 13 researchers working on liquid biopsy assays aimed at improving cancer treatment precision. She also organized the first saliva conference in Australasia in 2016.

Her research output includes as at 2023, more than 110 publications, 7 invited book chapters, and more than 5300 citations, with h-index of 40. Additionally, she has also filed 17 PCT applications and has licensed a saliva biomarker panel to ESN Cleer in Australia.

Punyadeera plays an editorial role in publications, such as the Journal of Oral Oncology, Pharmacogenomics Research and Personalized Medicine, and serves as an associate editor for BMC Medical Genomics and BMC Cancer.

“Nothing in life is to be feared. It is only to be understood,” are words that I live by. Spoken by Marie Curie, the Polish physicist and chemist who was the first woman to win a Nobel Peace Prize in Chemistry, a pioneering researcher in radioactivity who conducted her study in appalling conditions."

== Publications ==
- Kulasinghe, A., Lim, Y., Perry, C. & Punyadeera, C. (2015). Current trends and management in head and neck cancers. Head and neck cancer: Epidemiology, management and treatment outcomes [Cancer Etiology, Diagnosis and Treatments], 41–73.
- Zhang, X., Kulasinghe, A., Karim, R. & Punyadeera, C. (2015). Saliva diagnostics for oral diseases. Advances in salivary diagnostics, 131–156.
- Ovchinnikov, D., Wan, Y., Coman, W., Pandit, P., Cooper-White, J., Herman, J. & Punyadeera, C. (2014). DNA methylation at the novel CpG sites in the promoter of MED15/PCQAP gene as a biomarker for head and neck cancers. Biomarker Insights, 9, 53–60.

== Awards ==
- 2023 - Fellow of the Australian Academy of Technology, Science and Engineering.
- 2011 - Invited Fellow of the American Nano Society.
