= Pamela Naidoo-Ameglio =

- Occupation: Group Executive
- Employer: ANSTO
- Known for: Energy
- Board member of: Australian Museum

Pamela Naidoo-Ameglio is a South African nuclear energy and mining executive, Group Executive of ANSTO, who was awarded as a member of the Australian Academy of Technological Sciences and Engineering. She founded Women in Mining, South Africa.

== Early life ==
In her early childhood, Naidoo-Ameglio was fascinated by and inspired by primatologist Jane Goodall, and aviator, Amelia Earhart.

== Career ==
Naidoo-Ameglio is the past President of the Geological Society of South Africa, and Founder of Women in Mining South Africa (WIMSA). She is also experience in contributing to policy around nuclear medicine. She is an executive committee member of Women in Nuclear – Australia.

In 2018, Naidoo-Ameglio started working at ANSTO following 24 years in the mining industry, as the first woman with the title of Group Executive of Nuclear Operations. Her career and experience includes positions at various mining organisations such as South 32, BHP, Rio Tinto and De Beers.

Naidoo-Ameglio is an advocate of women in STEM, and is 'proudly a women of colour... and a champion of diversity and inclusion'.

"My advice to younger women working in nuclear or related areas would be to understand your values and non-negotiables and let them guide you. This is a path I still follow,' concluded Pamela.

Naidoo-Ameglio is on the scientific Advisory Board of the Australian Museum, and judging panel for the Australian Museum Eureka prizes, for the Macquarie University "Eureka Prize for Outstanding Early Career Researcher".

Naidoo-Ameglio gave an address at the 25th Kenneth Finlay Lecture, organised by the UNSW School of Minerals and Energy Resources Engineering.

== Prizes and awards ==
- 2025 - Fellow of the Australian Academy of the Technological Sciences and Engineering.
