= Radio over fiber =

Light modulated by a radio frequency signal and transmitted over optical fiber

Radio over fiber (RoF) or RF over fiber (RFoF) refers to a technology whereby light is modulated by a radio frequency signal and transmitted over an optical fiber link. Main technical advantages of using fiber optical links are lower transmission losses and reduced sensitivity to noise and electromagnetic interference compared to all-electrical signal transmission.

Applications range from the transmission of mobile radio signals (3G, 4G, 5G and WiFi) and the transmission of cable television signals (CATV) to the transmission of RF L-Band signals in ground stations for satellite communications.

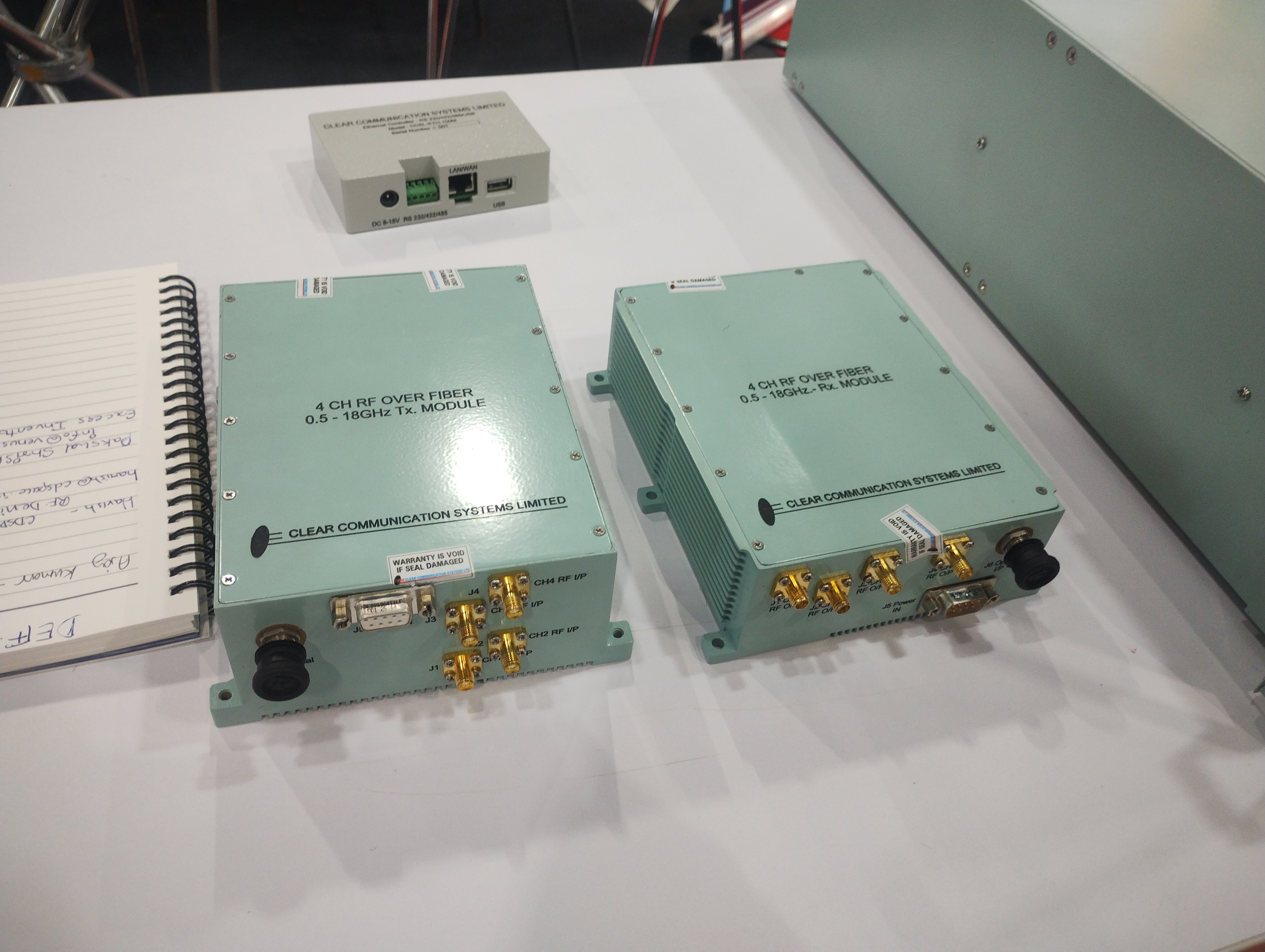
RF over fiber machines at DEF-TECH Bharat 2026, KTPO, Bengaluru

== General Advantage ==
Low attenuation

Signals transmitted on optical fiber attenuate much less than through other media like metal cables or wireless media. By using optical fiber, the radio signals can gap larger transmission distances, reducing the need of additional repeaters or amplifiers.

== Applications ==
=== Wireless Communications ===
In the area of Wireless Communications one main application is to facilitate Wireless access, such as 5G and WiFi simultaneously from the same antenna. In other words, radio signals are carried over fiber-optic cable. Thus, a single antenna can receive any and all radio signals (5G, Wifi, cell, etc..) carried over a single-fiber cable to a central location where equipment then converts the signals; this is opposed to the traditional way where each protocol type (5G, WiFi, cell) requires separate equipment at the location of the antenna.

Although radio transmission over fiber is used for multiple purposes, such as in cable television (CATV) networks and in satellite base stations, the term RoF is usually applied when this is done for wireless access.

In RoF systems, wireless signals are transported in optical form between a central station and a set of base stations before being radiated through the air. Each base station is adapted to communicate over a radio link with at least one user's mobile station located within the radio range of said base station. The advantage is that the equipment for WiFi, 5G and other protocols can be centralized in one place, with remote antennas attached via fiber optic serving all protocols. It greatly reduces the equipment and maintenance cost of the network.

RoF technology enables convergence of fixed and mobile networks.

RoF transmission systems are usually classified into two main categories (RF-over-fiber; IF-over-fiber) depending on the frequency range of the radio signal to be transported.

- a) In RF-over-fiber architecture, a data-carrying RF (radio frequency) signal with a high frequency is imposed on a lightwave signal before being transported over the optical link. Therefore, wireless signals are optically distributed to base stations directly at high frequencies and converted from the optical to electrical domain at the base stations before being amplified and radiated by an antenna. As a result, no frequency up–down conversion is required at the various base stations, thereby resulting in simple and rather cost-effective implementation is enabled at the base stations.
- b) In IF-over-fiber architecture, an IF (intermediate frequency) radio signal with a lower frequency is used for modulating light before being transported over the optical link. Therefore, before radiation through the air, the signal must be up-converted to RF at the base station.

Access to dead zones

An important application of RoF is its use to provide wireless coverage in the area where wireless backhaul link is not possible. These zones can be areas inside a structure such as a tunnel, areas behind buildings, Mountainous places or secluded areas such as jungles.

FTTA (Fiber to the antenna)

By using an optical connection directly to the antenna, the equipment vendor can gain several advantages like low line losses, immunity to lightning strikes/electric discharges and reduced complexity of base station by attaching lightweight optical-to-electrical (O/E) converter directly to antenna.

==== Advantages for Wireless Communications ====
Low complexity

RoF makes use of the concept of a remote station (RS). This station only consists of an optical-to-electrical (O/E) (and an optional frequency up or down converter), amplifiers, and the antenna. This means that the resource management and signal generation circuitry of the base station can be moved to a centralized location and shared between several remote stations, thus simplifying the architecture.

Lower cost

Simpler structure of remote base station means lower cost of infrastructure, lower power consumption by devices and simpler maintenance all contributed to lowering the overall installation and maintenance cost. Further reduction can also be made by use of low-cost graded index polymer optical fiber (GIPOF)

Future-proof

Fiber optics are designed to handle gigabits/second speeds which means they will be able to handle speeds offered by future generations of networks for years to come. RoF technology is also protocol and bit-rate transparent, hence, can be employed to use any current and future technologies. New RoF techniques that support MIMO-enabled wireless services, notably 4G/5G mobile and 802.11 WLAN standards, have also been proposed.

==== Satellite Communications ====
In Satellite Communications RF-over-fiber technology is employed to transmit, mainly RF signals in the L-Band frequency range (950 MHz to 2150 MHz), between a central control room and a satellite antenna at a satellite earth station. By so doing, high frequency equipment can be centralized and high-loss, heavy and expensive coaxial cables can be replaced. Typically this RF-over-Fiber technology is considered for transmission distances starting at about 50 meters. With the use of DWDM RF-over-Fiber systems even the low loss bi-directional transmission of multiple RF signals over one optical fiber with transmission distances up to 100 km is enabled.

K_{a}-Band Earth Station Diversity in Satellite Communication

State-of-the art satellite communication systems at the highest data rates are operated on the K_{a} band . As transmission quality on K_{a} band frequencies is heavily dependent on weather conditions, suitable system configurations need to be carefully planned and chosen. In K_{a} band Site Diversity configurations signal transmission is redirected from the Main Site to a Diverse Site in case of adverse weather conditions. These Site Diversity configurations, often rely on DWDM RF-over-Fibre transmission systems, as those are the most cost efficient solutions and ensure good signal quality.

==== Cable Television ====
One popular use for RF over fiber is for cable TV systems. Content providers may transport their entire CATV channel lineup over a single-fiber optic cable, because this way they can transport the signal for hundreds of km. It works like this: An electrical RF signal usually in the range of 54–870 MHz is converted to modulated light using RF 1310 nm or 1550 nm laser optics. The light travels over single-mode fiber to the fiber optic RF receiver where is converted back to electrical RF. Electrical RF is directly connected to a TV or set-top box. 1550 nm is more popular because it has less losses in the fiber and by using fiber-optic amplifier known as EDFA it is possible to extend the transport distance. 1310 nm loses about 0.35 dB/km of optical signal, 1550 nm loses only 0.25 dB/km. Optical budget between transmitter and receiver varies depending on the transmitter power and receiver sensitivity.

== Deployment ==
As of April 2012, AT&T had 3000 systems deployed in the United States in places like stadiums, shopping malls and inside buildings. "We continue to go very, very aggressively on distributing the antenna system solutions", said CEO Randall Stephenson in 2012.

In China, systems are being widely deployed in industrial zones, harbors, hospitals and supermarkets. Plans are in place to expand into rural zones along rail lines, and in new residential and commercial construction spaces. It is believed China will be the leading user of the technology and this will bring down the cost of equipment.

== Implementations ==
The Very Large Array in New Mexico was one of the first RF systems to switch to using fiber instead of coax and waveguides.
