= Australian Academy of Technology and Engineering =

Professional association

- Type: Academy
- Industry: Technology
- Founded: 1975; 51 years ago in Melbourne, Victoria, Australia
- Founder: Sir Ian McLennan
- Headquarters: Melbourne, Australia
- Area served: Australia
- Key people: Dr Katherine Woodthorpe (president)
- Revenue: 6,534,392 Australian dollar (2023)
- Total assets: 18,190,214 Australian dollar (2023)
- Number of employees: 30 (2023)
- Website: www.atse.org.au

The Australian Academy of Technology and Engineering (ATSE) is an independent learned academy that helps Australians understand and use technology to solve complex problems.

== Organisation ==
ATSE operates as an independent, non-government, not-for-profit, chartered organisation.

As of 2020 it was composed of nearly 900 fellows, bringing together Australia's leading experts in applied science, technology, and engineering, to provide impartial, practical and evidence-based advice on how to achieve sustainable solutions and advance prosperity.

The academy's governance structure consists of a board, an assembly (strategic advisory body), a number of board committees, policy-generating forums, state- and territory-based divisions, and a professional secretariat.

== Fellowship ==
=== Foundation fellows ===
Foundation fellows include:

- Graeme Bird
- John Christian
- Bob Durie
- Keith Farrer
- John Gladstones
- Antoni Karbowiak
- Philip Law
- Alec Lazenby
- Ian McLennan – Foundation president
- Robert Muncey
- Mark Oliphant
- June Olley
- David Solomon
- James Vernon
- Bob Ward
- Prof Howard Worner
- Yan Zhuge

== See also ==
- Office of the Chief Scientist (Australia)
