= 2022 Australia Day Honours =

Australian honours list

The 2022 Australia Day Honours are appointments to various orders and honours to recognise and reward good works by Australian citizens. The list was announced on 26 January 2022 by the Governor General of Australia, David Hurley.

The Australia Day Honours are the first of the two major annual honours lists, the first announced to coincide with Australia Day (26 January), with the other being the Queen's Birthday Honours, which are announced on the second Monday in June.

1,040 people have been recognised in this honours list with 732 going to civilians and 47% of the list are women.

== Order of Australia ==
Order of Australia civil ribbon

Order of Australia military ribbon

=== Companion of the Order of Australia (AC) ===
==== General Division ====
- Distinguished Professor James Langham Dale, AO– For eminent service to agricultural science, particularly through biological and biotechnological research and development, leadership, and to gene technology.
- Dr Alan Simon Finkel, AO – For eminent service to science, to national energy innovation and research infrastructure capability, to climate change and COVID-19 response initiatives, and to science and engineering education.
- Distinguished Professor Jennifer Marshall Graves, AO – For eminent service to science, particularly through leadership and research in evolutionary genetics, to international and national professional societies, for science education in schools, and as a mentor and role model for women.
- Professor Ary Anthony Hoffmann – For eminent service to science, particularly evolutionary biology and ecological genetics, through research, mentoring and education, and to professional scientific organisations.
- Dr Graeme Moad – For eminent service to science, particularly polymer design and synthesis and radical polymerization, education through mentoring, and to professional scientific organisations.
- Dr Helen Marion Nugent, AO – For eminent service to people with disability through leadership of social and economic policy reform and implementation, to business, to the arts, and to the community.
- John Malcolm Wylie, AM – For eminent service to the community through leadership in the sporting, cultural, philanthropic and business sectors.

=== Officer of the Order of Australia (AO) ===
==== General Division ====
- Dylan Martin Alcott, OAM – For distinguished service to paralympic sport, particularly to tennis, and as a role model for people with disability, and to the community through a range of organisations.
- Dr Susan Lesley Barrell – For distinguished service to earth science through meteorology and research organisations.
- Maggie Beer, AM – For distinguished service to the tourism and hospitality industries as a cook, restaurateur and author, and to aged welfare.
- Dr Tom Beer – For distinguished service to science, particularly environmental risk, climate processes and sustainability, through research organisations.
- Professor Julie Ellen Byles – For distinguished service to medical research, to gerontology, and to professional scientific organisations.
- Professor John Alexander Church – For distinguished service to climate science through oceanographic and sea-level research and publications.
- Andrew Alexander Colvin, APM, OAM – For distinguished service to law enforcement, to counter terrorism initiatives, and to bushfire recovery programs.
- Professor Sandra Jean Eades – For distinguished service to medical research, to Indigenous health, and to professional organisations.
- Commissioner Shane Alan Fitzsimmons, AFSM – For distinguished service to the community through leadership roles within fire and emergency response organisations.
- Deborra-Lee Furness – For distinguished service to children as an adoption advocate, to not-for-profit organisations as an ambassador, and to the arts.
- Dr John Sylvester Gladstones, AM – For distinguished service to primary industry, particularly agriculture and viticulture, and as an author.
- Dr David William Gruen – For distinguished service to public administration, to economic research, to business, and to education.
- John Kenneth Hartigan – For distinguished service to the media industry, to Indigenous welfare, and to sport.
- Eve Kantor – For distinguished service to the community through philanthropic support for a range of organisations, and to the environment.
- Professor Geoffrey Richard Lancaster, AM – For distinguished service to the arts, particularly music, through education, performance, research and philanthropy.
- Elizabeth Honor Lloyd, AM – For distinguished service to the community, particularly to women and refugees, through a range of social welfare initiatives.
- Lena Nyadbi – For distinguished service to the visual arts as a contemporary Indigenous artist.
- Georgina Hope Rinehart – For distinguished service to the mining sector, to the community through philanthropic initiatives, and to sport as a patron.
- Rodney Graham Sims – For distinguished service to public administration in economic policy and regulatory roles.
- Mark Sullivan – For distinguished service to medical research, to business, and to education.
- Graham John Tuckwell – For distinguished service to the community through philanthropic support of education scholarships, and to business.
- Louise Tuckwell – For distinguished service to the community through philanthropic support of education scholarships.
- John Ernest Walsh, AM – For distinguished service to public health through leadership and advocacy roles.
- Dr Jane Elizabeth Wilson – For distinguished service to business, to government, to health and aged care, and to education.
- Mark Wootton – For distinguished service to the community through philanthropic support for a range of organisations, and to the environment.

==== Military Division ====
- Rear Admiral Jaimie Charles Hatcher, DSC, AM, RAN – For distinguished service to the Australian Defence Force in senior command roles.
- Major General Matthew William Hall, AM, CSC – For distinguished service and exceptional leadership as Chief of Staff, Headquarters Joint Operations Command, the Director Defence Intelligence Organisation and the Australian Military Representative to the North Atlantic Treaty Organization.
- Air Vice Marshal Catherine Jane Roberts, AM, CSC – For distinguished service as Head Aerospace System Division and Head Air Force Capability.

=== Member of the Order of Australia (AM) ===
==== General Division ====
- Peter Grant Airey – For significant service to engineering, and to professional organisations.
- Allan Anforth – For significant service to the law, to social welfare, and to education.
- Alan-Roy Bakamumu Marika – For significant service to the Indigenous community of North East Arnhem Land.
- Dewani Bakkum – For significant service to migrant and refugee services, and to the community.
- Associate Professor Kristine Kay Barlow-Stewart – For significant service to medicine in the field of human genetics, and to education.
- Professor Amanda Barnard – For significant service to computational science, to medical research, and to education.
- Catherine Bartolo – For significant service to youth, to social welfare, and to the community of Logan.
- Hugh Gordon Bateman – For significant service to business through real estate, and to the community.
- Dr Graeme Edward Batley – For significant service to environmental toxicology and chemical science.
- Virginia Mary Baxter – For significant service to the arts through performance, production, writing and publishing.
- Helene Flora Bender, OAM – For significant service to the community through health, education, not-for-profit and sporting organisations.
- The late Cindy Joy Berwick – For significant service to the Indigenous community of New South Wales, particularly through education.
- Professor Prithvipall Singh Bhathal – For significant service to pathology, to education and mentoring, and to medical research.
- Associate Professor Eleanor Anne Bourke – For significant service to Indigenous heritage, to justice, and to education.
- Susan Jennifer Boyd – For significant service to international relations, to tertiary education, and to women's affairs.
- Melanie Brock – For significant service to Australia-Japan relations.
- Dr Cuong Trong Bui, OAM – For significant service to multiculturalism, and to the Vietnamese community of Queensland.
- Professor Leslie Burnett – For significant service to pathology, to medical research, and to professional societies.
- Dr Andrew Edward Cattermole, RFD – For significant service to dentistry through periodontics education, and to professional organisations.
- Denise Chalmers – For significant service to tertiary education, and to professional associations.
- Cathy Chye Yah Chong – For significant service to multiculturalism in South Australia, and to the community.
- Dr Deborah Jane Cockrell – For significant service to dentistry, to professional organisations, and to education.
- Dr Mimi Colligan – For significant service to community history, and heritage preservation.
- Catherine-Anne Cox – For significant service to netball as a player and coach.
- Professor Gregory Brian Crawford – For significant service to palliative care, and to tertiary education.
- Helen Rosemary Crowe – For significant service to urology and oncology nursing, and to professional societies.
- John William Curtin – For significant service to oral and maxillofacial surgery, to dentistry, and to professional associations.
- Professor Geoffrey Paul Delaney – For significant service to oncology and cancer services, and to tertiary education.
- Professor Heather Anne Douglas – For significant service to tertiary law education, and to the community.
- The Honourable Samuel Sydney Doumany – For significant service to parliament and politics in Queensland, and to the community.
- John Michael Dowling – For significant service to intellectual property law, and to professional associations.
- Professor Brian Michael Draper – For significant service as a psychiatrist to tertiary education, to medicine, and to the community.
- Mary Duffy – For significant service to medicine in the field of lung cancer.
- Emeritus Professor Maxine Duke – For significant service to education, to nursing, and to professional associations.
- Dr Catherine Mary Duncan – For significant service to medicine in the field of obstetrics and gynaecology, and to professional associations.
- Professor Emerita Andrea Durbach – For significant service to the law, to human rights, and to tertiary education.
- Associate Professor Robert Housley Farnsworth, OAM – For significant service to medicine in the field of urology, and to professional associations.
- Professor Prudence Ann Francis – For significant service to medical research in the field of oncology, and to education.
- Thomas James Fricke – For significant service to engineering, to professional societies, and to the community.
- Keith Gallasch – For significant service to the arts though performance, writing and production.
- Daniel Gauchat – For significant service to tertiary education, to cultural organisations, and to business.
- Delta Lea Goodrem – For significant service to the not-for-profit sector, and to the performing arts.
- Associate Professor Leeanne Grigg – For significant service to cardiology, and to professional societies.
- Rachel Mary Grimes – For significant service to business in the field of accountancy, and to professional associations.
- Kenneth Ian Guthrie – For significant service to conservation and the environment, particularly to the solar energy sector.
- Stephen Charles Hains – For significant service to local government, to education, and to the community.
- David Antony Haintz – For significant service to financial planning, to business, and to the community.
- Professor Roslynne Elizabeth Hansen – For significant service to urban planning architecture, and to educational, professional, and heritage conservation organisations.
- Dr Richard Wayman Harper – For significant service to cardiology, to medical research, and to professional associations.
- Professor S. Alexander Haslam – For significant service to tertiary education, particularly psychology, though research and mentoring.
- Professor William Frederic Heddle – For significant service to cardiology, to tertiary education, and to professional associations.
- Dr Geoffrey Kenneth Herkes – For significant service to medicine as a neurologist, to medical research, and to professional associations.
- Professor Mark Stephen Hertzberg – For significant service to haematology, to tertiary education, and to research.
- Noel Jeffrey Hicks – For significant service to the Parliament of Australia, and to the community of the Riverina.
- Martin Andrew Hill – For significant service to business, to sailing, and to the community.
- Meredith Maxwell Hinchliffe – For significant service to the arts through a range of roles and organisations.
- Judith Anne Hogben – For significant service to people with disability, to seniors, and to children.
- Roderic (Rick) Holliday-Smith – For significant service to business through a range of roles and organisations.
- Valerie Hoogstad – For significant service to the not-for-profit sector, and to tertiary education.
- Professor Virginia Gail Hooker – For significant service to tertiary education, and to Asia-Pacific relations.
- Susan Elizabeth Horwitz – For significant service to the community, and to sport.
- Jill Iliffe – For significant service to nursing through leadership roles with professional organisations.
- Dr Lawrence Ingvarson – For significant service to education, to research, and to pedagogy.
- Carol Innes – For significant service to the Indigenous community of Western Australia.
- Emeritus Professor Leslie Michael Irwig – For significant service to tertiary education, and to medicine as an epidemiologist.
- Professor Ross Anthony Jeffree – For significant service to conservation and the environment, to nuclear science, and to education.
- Charles Ross Johnson – For significant service to town planning, and to the community.
- Dr Robert Johnson – For significant service to veterinary science, and to professional societies.
- Dr Sharann Heather Johnson – For significant service to community health as an occupational hygienist, and to service groups.
- Dr Margaret Patricia Kay – For significant service to medicine, to medical education, and to migrant health.
- Gabrielle Mary Kelly – For significant service to business, and to film and television.
- Dr Lynne Kelly – For significant service to science education as a writer and researcher.
- Professor Farees (Fary) Khan – For significant service to rehabilitation medicine, to research, and to professional societies.
- Dr Alice Ruth Killen – For significant service to medical administration, and to healthcare delivery.
- Dr James Humphrey La Nauze – For significant service to ophthalmology, and to not-for-profit organisations.
- Professor Alfred King-Yin Lam – For significant service to tertiary education, to research, and to pathology.
- Professor Barbara Anne Leggett – For significant service to gastroenterology and hepatology, and to medical research.
- Margaret Elizabeth Lehmann – For significant service to the community of the Barossa through a range of roles.
- Austrelle Susan (Sue) Lennox – For significant service to water conservation and the environment through education and networks.
- Lee Liberman – For significant service to the Jewish community through not-for-profit and education organisations.
- Dr Michael Liffman – For significant service to tertiary education, the not-for-profit sector, and visual arts.
- Professor Hua Kun Liu – For significant service to the scientific research sector, and to tertiary education.
- The late Professor John Duncan Love – For significant service to tertiary education, particularly physics.
- Dianne Lucas – For significant service to women through sexual assault, domestic and family violence support organisations.
- Peter McGrath – For significant service to rugby union as an administrator, and to tertiary education.
- Elizabeth Ann MacGregor, OBE – For significant service to museums and galleries through leadership roles with arts institutions.
- Christine Mary Mackenzie – For significant service to librarianship, and to professional associations through leadership roles.
- Emma Jennifer McKeon – For significant service to swimming as a Gold Medallist at the Tokyo 2020 Olympic Games.
- Stephen John Macliver – For significant service to the law, to human rights, and to the community.
- James Francis McMahon – For significant service to veterans and their families, and to the community.
- The late Pamela Hope Mam – For significant service to the Indigenous community of Queensland through nursing.
- Victoria Fay Marles – For significant service to conservation and the environment, and to the community.
- Professor Helen Siobhan Marshall – For significant service to medicine in the field of vaccinology and public health, to research, and to education.
- Norma Lynn Mason – For significant service to local government, and to the community.
- Patrick Sammy Mills – For significant service to basketball, to charitable initiatives, and to the Indigenous community.
- The Honourable Maxine Veronica Morand – For significant service to the Parliament of Victoria, and to community health.
- Dr Graeme William Morgan – For significant service to medicine through radiation oncology practice and research.
- Jennifer Margery Morison – For significant service to business in the field of accountancy, and to professional associations.
- Professor Peter Thomas Morley – For significant service to intensive care medicine, to professional societies, and to tertiary education.
- Paul Murnane – For significant service to the not-for-profit sector, the performing arts, and to business.
- Professor Tuan Van Nguyen – For significant service to medical research, to osteoporosis and fracture prevention, and to tertiary education.
- Professor Paul Norman – For significant service to medicine in the field of vascular surgery.
- Ian David Nosworthy – For significant service to the law, particularly arbitration, and to professional associations.
- Kevin George Owens – For significant service to sailing through a range of organisations and roles.
- The Honourable Gaetano (Tony) Pagone – For significant service to the law, to the judiciary, and to professional associations.
- Dr Maria Pallotta-Chiarolli – For significant service to the LGBTIQ community, and to education.
- Nicolas Ernest Parkhill – For significant service to community health, particularly to people living with HIV/AIDS, and to healthcare delivery.
- Jan Elizabeth Phillips – For significant service to palliative care and oncology nursing.
- The Honourable Bronwyn Jane Pike – For significant service to social welfare and not-for-profit organisations, and to the Parliament of Victoria.
- Dr Rosalie Barbara Pockett – For significant service to the community through social welfare education and initiatives.
- Richard Bruce Porter – For significant service to business, and to education through leadership and advisory roles.
- Professor Robert Michael Power – For significant service to medicine in the field of international development and research, and to education.
- Kathryn Anne Presser – For significant service to business in the field of accountancy, and to the community.
- John Hunter Ralston – For significant service to international human rights law.
- Robert William Reid – For significant service to international criminal investigations.
- Daniel Joseph Ricciardo – For significant service to motor sport as a competitor and ambassador, and to the community.
- Joseph Toufic Rizk, OAM – For significant service to the not-for-profit sector, and to banking and commerce.
- Annette Susan Roberts – For significant service to the community through life saving and water safety organisations.
- Emeritus Professor Timothy Roberts – For significant service to environmental and life sciences, and to tertiary education.
- Professor Colin Frederick Robertson – For significant service to medicine, to research, and to professional organisations.
- Emeritus Professor Arie Rotem – For significant service to tertiary education, and to public health.
- Sally Ruston – For significant service to primary education, and to professional associations.
- The late Susan Margaret Salthouse – For significant service as an advocate for people with disability, and to the prevention of family violence.
- John Lewis Schumann, OAM – For significant service to the veteran community, to music, and to the community.
- Dr Raymond Neil Shuey, APM – For significant service to road safety organisations and initiatives.
- The Honourable Justice Michael John Slattery, AM, RAN – For significant service to the law, to the judiciary, and to professional legal associations.
- Graham Sydney Smith – For significant service to the community of the Newcastle region through a range of organisations.
- Clinical Associate Professor Saxon Donald Smith – For significant service to medicine as a dermatologist and researcher, and to professional societies.
- George Stamas – For significant service to the community through the not-for-profit sector, and to business.
- Wendy Maree Steendam APM – For significant service to the community through emergency response organisations.
- Professor Elsdon Storey – For significant service to medicine in the field of neurology, and to professional associations.
- Morris Stuart – For significant service to the Indigenous community, and to choral music.
- Professor Bronwyn Gwenneth Stuckey – For significant service to medical research, to endocrinology, and to women's health.
- Laurie Frederick Sutton – For significant service to the not-for-profit sector, and to business.
- The late Dr Geoffrey Symonds – For significant service to medical research, particularly through gene therapy.
- Professor Marc Tennant – For significant service to tertiary dental education, and to professional associations.
- David Emlyn Thomas – For significant service to the arts, particularly through the museums and galleries sector.
- Patricia Thompson – For significant service to Indigenous community through governance roles.
- Professor Sandra Claire Thompson – For significant service to tertiary education, to rural and regional health, and to Indigenous health.
- Professor Margaret Jane Turner – For significant service to medical research, to psychiatry and to psycho-oncology.
- Antony Howard Walker – For significant service to the media as a journalist, and to the community.
- Caroline Margaret (Lyn) Walker – For significant service to the community through domestic violence, sexual assault and health promotion initiatives.
- Emeritus Professor Marianne Clare Wallis – For significant service to tertiary education, to nursing, and to research.
- Alison Mary Watkins – For significant service to business through leadership roles with a range of organisations.
- The Honourable Garry Allan Watts – For significant service to the law, and to the judiciary, particularly to the Family Court.
- Dr Arthur Charles Webster – For significant service to veterinary science, to business, and to tertiary education.
- Alan David Wein – For significant service to business, and to the community.
- Vicky Lee Welgraven – For significant service to women through social welfare organisations, and to Indigenous health.
- Andrew Geoffrey Wheeler – For significant service to the community through charitable organisations.
- Shayne Joan Wilde – For significant service to the LGBTQIA and disabled communities through a range of roles and reforms.
- David Jon Williams – For significant service to people with disability, and to education.
- Professor John Matthew Williams – For significant service to tertiary education, to the law, and to professional organisations.
- The Very Reverend Father Peter Gregory Williams – For significant service to the Catholic Church in Australia, and to tertiary education.
- The late Terrance John Willis – For significant service to rugby union, particularly through judicial roles.

==== Military Division ====
Navy

- Commodore Donald Leslie Dezentje, CSM, RAN – For exceptional service to the Royal Australian Navy in senior command positions in the fields of aviation and personnel management.
- Commodore Braddon John Wheeler, RAN – For exceptional service to the Royal Australian Navy in senior command positions.

Army

- Major General Susan May Coyle, CSC, DSM – For exceptional performance of duty as the Commander Joint Task Force 633 on Operation ACCORDION from January to November 2020.
- Brigadier Gavin Harrower Duncan, DSC – For exceptional service to the Australian Defence Force in the fields of organisational change and cultural reform, and strategic military responses development.
- Brigadier Nicole Longley – For exceptional service as Director Logistics – Army, Director General Supply Chain Branch and Deputy Head of Joint Support Services Division.
- Warrant Officer Grant Stephen McFarlane, OAM – For exceptional service in senior Regimental Sergeant Major appointments, particularly as Regimental Sergeant Major of the Army.
- Colonel Penelope Anne Saultry, CSC – For exceptional service to the Australian Defence Force in law and international jurisprudence.
- Colonel Griffith Charles Thomas – For exceptional service to the Australian Defence Force in people capability development.

Air Force

- Air Commodore Davin James Augustine, CSM – For exceptional service in training development, organisational reform, and strategic workforce management for the Australian Defence Force.
- Group Captain James Philip Badgery – For exceptional service to the Australian Defence Force in aerospace capability development.
- Air Commodore Jacqueline Elissa Churchill – For exceptional service to the Australian Defence Force in aerospace acquisition and sustainment.
- Wing Commander Michel-Louise Devine, CSM – For exceptional service in aviation medicine and in the health intelligence response to COVID-19.
- Air Commodore Gregory John Frisina – For exceptional service in flying training, aviation training implementation, and personnel administration for the Australian Defence Force.
- Group Captain Adrian Bernard Maso – For exceptional service to the Australian Defence Force in air combat capability development.
- Warrant Officer Raylee Sue Scott – For exceptional service to the Australian Defence Force in personnel and cultural development, change management and executive support.
- Warrant Officer Stephen Francis Weaver – For exceptional service to the Australian Defence Force in physical training development and Indigenous cultural advancement.

==== Honorary ====
- Professor Xinhua Wu – For significant service to manufacturing science, to tertiary education, and to engineering.

=== Medal of the Order of Australia (OAM) ===
==== General Division ====
- Colonel Ian Francis Ahearn – For service to veterans.
- Kazi Khalequzzaman Ali – For service to the Islamic community.
- The late David William Allen – For service to veterans, and to the community.
- The late Kerry Marie Allen – For service to the arts through music education.
- Kerry Anderson – For service to business, and community development.
- Sunil Arachchi – For service to the Sri Lankan community of Victoria.
- Jared Archibald – For service to the museums and galleries sector.
- Rachel Argaman – For service to the tourism and hospitality industry.
- Margaret Joy Baker – For service to conservation and the environment.
- James John Barkell – For service to the community through a range of organisations.
- Elizabeth Ann Barraclough – For service to the community of Terrey Hills.
- Lisa Barron – For service to the fashion industry.
- John Frederick Beare – For service to the community through a range of organisations.
- Kerrie Beauglehall – For service to the community through charitable organisations.
- Ross Thomas Beckley – For service to community health.
- Margaret Vona Beiers – For service to tertiary education, and to the community.
- The late John Robert Bell – For service to veterans and their families.
- Margret Bell – For service to the community of Camden.
- Dr Faye Bendrups – For service to the performing arts, particularly through music.
- Alan Charles Bennett – For service to the community through St John Ambulance.
- Otway Geoffrey Benson – For service to the community of Tenterfield.
- Dylys Elizabeth Bertelsen – For service to community health, and to charitable organisations.
- Dr Deborah Kathleen Beswick – For service to education.
- Dr Christine Elizabeth Biggs – For service to the international community through diplomatic service.
- Colleen Anne Billows – For service to the community through charitable organisations.
- Clinical Professor Catherine Stella Birman – For service to medicine through otolaryngology.
- Janice Patricia Blackford – For service to the arts, and to the community of Brisbane.
- Cheryl Anne Blackwell – For service to the community through a range of organisations.
- Sharon Patricia Blain – For service to the retail industry.
- Gregory Errol Blashki – For service to the Jewish community.
- John Michael Blaxland – For service to the performing arts, particularly to theatre.
- Philippa May Bloomfield – For service to youth through Girl Guides.
- Kay Christine Bolton – For service to landcare management.
- Campbell Robert Bolwell – For service to mechanical engineering.
- Adrian Boss – For service to the community, particularly through cycling programs.
- Niels Bowen – For service to the pharmacy profession.
- Anthony Boyce – For service to Australian rules football.
- Terence Barry Bracken – For service to the motorsport industry.
- Jo-Anne Bragg – For service to environmental law.
- Vincent Branigan – For service to the community of Benalla.
- Michael Leon Brannock – For service to surf lifesaving.
- Dr Peter Daniel Braude – For service to medicine as a physician.
- James Brice – For service to music education and performance.
- Claire Lynette Brittain – For service to the community of Claremont, and to the environment.
- Robert McDonald Brown – For service to the community through history preservation organisations.
- David Bryar – For service to youth through Scouts.
- Janet Alexandra Bryar – For service to youth through Scouts.
- Michael Robert Bryce – For service to urban design.
- Nola Buck – For service to people with disability, and to the community.
- Dr Laurence Eames Budd – For service to medicine as a paediatrician.
- Dr Marie-Frances Burke – For service to medicine as an oncologist.
- Margaret Helen Burns – For service to the community of Lithgow.
- Evelyn June Bury – For service to country music.
- Derek Butcher – For service to bromeliad horticulture.
- Margaret Butcher – For service to bromeliad horticulture.
- Elizabeth Violet Butterworth – For service to the community through a range of organisations.
- Trevor Buzzacott – For service to the Indigenous community of South Australia.
- Robert Grant Cairney – For service to cricket.
- Criss Canning – For service to the visual arts.
- Dianne Cant – For service to the fashion industry, and to the community.
- Lesley Jacqueline Carlsen – For service to the community through a range of roles.
- Tim Carroll – For service to the community of Bankstown.
- Malcolm David Carson – For service to veterans and their families.
- Bonnie Jennifer Carter – For service to community health.
- Paul Carter – For service to swimming.
- Paul Lewin Carter – For service to the community through a range of roles.
- Brian Eric Carthew – For service to the community through a range of organisations.
- Malcolm James Cash – For service to veterans, and to the community of Launceston.
- William Kendle Chappell – For service to veterans and their families.
- John Szaja Chaskiel – For service to the community through Holocaust education and understanding.
- Yu Lan (Leila) Chin – For service to the Chinese community of Darwin.
- Mavis Isobel Chugg – For service to the community through a range of organisations.
- Charles Quinton Clark – For service to the community through a range of roles.
- Lorna Russell Clayton – For service to the community through a range of organisations.
- Pamela Brannan Cohen – For service to community health, and to the social work profession.
- Kate Cole – For service to workplace health and safety.
- Dr Lenore Marcella Coltheart – For service to community history.
- Professor Barbara Comber – For service to education.
- Pamela Esther Comerford – For service to community health.
- Anthony George Comley – For service to veterans and their families.
- Valerie Constable – For service to the pharmacy profession.
- Nathalie Carmen Cook – For service to dietetics.
- John Robertson Coppock – For service to the pharmacy profession.
- John Christopher Cornish – For service to youth through Scouts.
- Charles Maxwell Cornwell – For service to community health as a psychologist and social worker.
- David Michael Cottee – For service to the community of Talgarno.
- Vicki Lorraine Cottee – For service to the community of Talgarno.
- Mark Clifford Cotter – For service to surf lifesaving.
- Simon Patrick Cowland-Cooper – For service to the irrigation industry.
- Peter Reginald Cox – For service to the community through a range of organisations.
- The late Dennis Patrick Crane – For service to the community through a range of organisations.
- Rowan Crothers – For service to sport as a gold medallist at the Tokyo Paralympic Games 2020.
- Dr Robert John Cruise – For service to athletics.
- Barbara Carroll Cullen – For service to Australian rules football history.
- Peter Curtis – For service to the community through charitable organisations.
- Peter Joseph Daley – For service to rugby union.
- Patricia d'Apice – For service to education for people with vision impairment.
- Wellsley Thomas Darby – For service to the community of Brisbane.
- Helen Darch – For service to community health.
- Graham Claud Dark – For service to the community through a range of organisations.
- Greg Davies – For service to recreational flying.
- Garry Owen Davis – For service to the community through a range of roles.
- Ian Russell Davis – For service to the community, and to the law.
- Dr Susan Elizabeth Davis – For service to education, and to the performing and regional arts.
- William George Davis – For service to the Indigenous community of Queensland.
- Mary Elizabeth Dawes – For service to the community through charitable organisations.
- Susan Kathryn Day – For service to the community through a range of organisations.
- Anthony De Luca – For service to motoring clubs, and to the community.
- Kay Frances De Luca – For service to motoring clubs, and to the community.
- Madison De Rozario – For service to sport as a gold medallist at the Tokyo Paralympic Games 2020.
- Michael Debinski – For service to the community through a range of roles.
- Leslie Allan Dennis – For service to the community through a range of organisations.
- Frederick Francis Denny – For service to veterans and their families.
- Kellie Maree Dickerson – For service to the performing arts.
- Elizabeth Jan Dickeson – For service to the community of the Hunter.
- Dr John Edward Dickeson – For service to the community of the Hunter.
- Ian Barry Digby – For service to the community, and to the motor industry.
- John Clarence Dobson – For service to the legal profession.
- Anthony Ian Dodemaide – For service to sports administration, and to cricket.
- Graham Doherty – For service to the church.
- Dr Michael Jon Donaldson – For service to the Indigenous community of Western Australia.
- John Samuel Donnelly – For service to the community through social welfare organisations.
- Jane Doyle – For service to the broadcast media, particularly to television, and to the community.
- Peter Dunn – For service to the road transport industry.
- David Anthony Dunworth – For service to rugby union.
- Louise Dyskin – For service to the Jewish community.
- Claire Luize Eardley – For service to youth, and to the community.
- Malcolm Leslie Edward – For service to the stud merino industry, and to the community of Wagin.
- Claire Olivia Edwardes – For service to music.
- Douglas William Edwards – For service to radio as a comedy writer and creator.
- Nigel Edwards – For service to the community through a range of roles.
- Dr Robert Leslie Edwards – For service to medicine as a thoracic physician.
- Margaret Rita Eichholzer – For service to education.
- George El Khouri – For service to architecture, and to the community.
- Patricia Judith Elkin – For service to the arts in the New England region.
- Dr Peter Stephen Joseph Ellis – For service to medicine as a forensic pathologist.
- Roger Mallory Emmerson – For service to the community through a range of organisations.
- Roslyn May English – For service to the community of the Central Coast.
- The late Jakob (Kuba) Enoch – For service to the community through education.
- Patricia Mary Evatt – For service to the community through a range of organisations.
- Dr Louise Farrell – For service to medicine in the field of oncology.
- Valerie Fay Fewster – For service to community health.
- Valda Elaine Finn – For service to the community of Goolwa.
- Martin Fisk – For service to the community through social welfare organisations.
- Dr Criena Fitzgerald – For service to community history.
- Gary Bruce Fleetwood – For service to law enforcement agencies.
- Leonie Fleming – For service to aged welfare, and to education.
- Lynn Joan Fletcher – For service to the arts through children's literature.
- Graham Fredric Foard – For service to the community of Balwyn North.
- Gwenda Elizabeth Foard – For service to the community of Balwyn North.
- Lynne Folster – For service to the community through a range of organisations.
- The late Alister John Forsyth – For service to the community of Wollombi Valley.
- Anthony Arthur Fowler – For service to conservation and the environment.
- Jessica Fox – For service to sport as a gold medallist at the Tokyo Olympic Games 2020.
- Ian Robert Frame – For service to the community through a range of organisations.
- Linley Margaret Frame – For service to swimming, and to the community.
- The late Roger Charles Frankel – For service to public administration and international relations.
- Warwick Edwin Franks – For service to cricket, and to sports history.
- Peter Anthony Frazer – For service to the advancement of road safety, both nationally and internationally.
- Alan Peterson Frees – For service to education administration, and to the law.
- Elizabeth Joy Freier – For service to the Anglican Church of Australia, and to education.
- Robert Michael Freshfield – For service to veterans and their families.
- Pauline Claire Frost – For service to the community of Playford.
- Meredith Louise Fuller – For service to community health as a psychologist.
- Charmian Gadd – For service to music.
- Silvana Gaglia – For service to the community, and to people with disability.
- Norma Jean Gallagher – For service to the community of Dunedoo.
- Ronald Gallagher – For service to the community of Dunedoo.
- Professor Cherrie Ann Galletly – For service to medicine as a psychiatrist.
- Beverley Gail Garside – For service to community health.
- Professor Kurt Aaron Gebauer – For service to dermatology.
- Peter Kenneth Geiger – For service to the community of Canungra.
- Dr Peter Gianoutsos – For service to medicine as a respiratory physician.
- Graham Stewart Gibson – For service to cycling, and to the community.
- Andy Gild – For service to the community through charitable organisations.
- Kenneth John Gillman – For service to veterans and their families.
- Robyn Marie Glenn – For service to the community, and to children.
- Dr Stephen John Godfrey – For service to medicine as an ophthalmologist.
- Ted Goodacre – For service to the community of Lismore.
- Philip Hooper Goode – For service to the community in a range of roles.
- Dr Denis Hugh Gordon – For service to the community of Belmont.
- Donald Thomas Gore – For service to the community through social welfare organisations.
- James William Gough – For service to the livestock industry.
- Philippa Dion Graham – For service to the creative arts, particularly as a sculptor.
- Dr Matthew Gray – For service to community health.
- Paige Greco – For service to sport as a gold medallist at the Tokyo Paralympic Games 2020.
- Kimberlee Green – For service to netball.
- Thomas Anthony Green – For service to sport as a gold medallist at the Tokyo Olympic Games 2020.
- David John Gregory – For service to the small business sector.
- Sandra Louise Grieve – For service to community health.
- Roger Bartram Grund – For service to conservation and research as a lepidopterist.
- Dr Harold Gunatillake – For service to medicine, and to the Sri Lankan community of New South Wales.
- Susan Jane Gunn – For service to equestrian sport.
- Deepak-Raj Gupta – For service to the community of Canberra.
- Daniel Ange Hakim – For service to the international community through a range of roles.
- Margaret Helen Hall – For service to the community of Emerald.
- Patricia Hall – For service to the community of Liverpool.
- Benjamin Hance – For service to sport as a gold medallist at the Tokyo Paralympic Games 2020.
- Dr Kerry Lyn Hancock – For service to medicine through a range of roles.
- Matthew Peter Hansen – For service to recreational fishing, and to conservation.
- Jack Hargreaves – For service to sport as a gold medallist at the Tokyo Olympic Games 2020.
- Meg Harris – For service to sport as a gold medallist at the Tokyo Olympic Games 2020.
- Dr Pamela Brawdley Harrison – For service to palliative care, and to community history.
- Rosemary Ann Harrison – For service to equestrian sport.
- Dr Patricia Jean Hart – For service to the community of Armadale.
- Desmond John Harvey – For service to the community of the Clarence Valley.
- Anne Haycock – For service to tennis.
- Belinda Hazell – For service to primary industry.
- Dorothy Jean Heard – For service to the community of Numurkah.
- Peter Graham Heard – For service to the community of Numurkah.
- The late Kenneth Charles Heddle – For service to the community through emergency response organisations.
- Edward Anthony Helm – For service to veterans and their families.
- William Glenn Herbert – For service to the community through a range of organisations.
- Francis Oswald Herd – For service to the meat processing industry, and to the community.
- Myer Chil Herszberg – For service to the Jewish community.
- Sister Rosalie Anne Hetherington – For service to the Catholic Church of Australia.
- Donald Arthur Hewitt – For service to the community through social welfare organisations.
- William Roy Heycox – For service to the community through a range of organisations.
- Darren Hicks – For service to sport as a gold medallist at the Tokyo Paralympic Games 2020.
- Alexander Hill – For service to sport as a gold medallist at the Tokyo Olympic Games 2020.
- Edwin Robert Hill – For service to the community of Taree.
- Chelsea Mae Hodges – For service to sport as a gold medallist at the Tokyo Olympic Games 2020.
- Pamela Jill Hodgson – For service to the communities of Boorowa and Grenfell.
- Roz Holme – For service to wildlife conservation.
- Beverley Holmes – For service to the community of Walhalla.
- Sharon Louise Hoogland – For service to the community, particularly through the church.
- Rebecca Hooke – For service to community health.
- Dr Simon Hooton – For service to swimming, and to the community.
- William Jack Horsfall – For service to the pharmacy profession.
- Ruth Jean Hosking – For service to the community of Bendigo.
- Andrew Houston – For service to music.
- The late Brett Ian Howard – For service to power boating, and to the community.
- Irma Howell – For service to youth through Scouts.
- Bruce William Hudgson – For service to the community through a range of organisations.
- Judith Hugo – For service to the visual arts.
- Ngaire Margaret Huston – For service to softball.
- Caroline Marcelle Hutchinson – For service to the radio broadcast media.
- Jamie Hyams – For service to local government, and to the community of Glen Eira.
- Patricia Mary Irving – For service to the community of Warren.
- Lorraine Marshall Irving-Gormly – For service to ballet.
- Roma Beryl Ivetic – For service to the community of Castlemaine.
- Jyllie Jackson – For service to the community of Lismore.
- Allison Jenvey – For service to vocational education, and to the community.
- Stephen Craig Jermyn – For service to the community through charitable organisations.
- Alan Frederick Jessop – For service to the community through charitable organisations.
- Alan David Joffe – For service to the Jewish community.
- Martin Ronald Johnson – For service to the community of Gawler.
- Josephine Louise Jones – For service to conservation and the environment.
- Phillip Sydney Jones – For service to oenology.
- Jane Margaret Jose – For service to the community through cultural and charitable organisations.
- John Clark Just, PSM – For service to the community through a range of roles.
- Beverley Anne Kable – For service to the community through charitable organisations.
- Alice Guay Kang – For service to veterans, and to community health.
- David John Kelly – For service to cricket, and to education.
- Janice Margaret Kelly – For service to the community through a range of organisations.
- John Lochwood Kent – For service to the community of Nambucca Heads.
- Samantha Kerr – For service to football.
- Terence Carson Keys – For service to the community through a range of organisations.
- Ante Kilic – For service to the Croatian community of South Australia.
- Jennifer King – For service to music education.
- Lorraine Florence Kinrade – For service to the community of Drouin.
- Debra Knight – For service to community through charitable organisations.
- Douglas Alexander Knight – For service to rugby league.
- Dr Bartlomiej Piotr Kolodziejczyk – For service to science in the field of hydrogen energy.
- Robert Arthur Krause – For service to the community of Marburg.
- Julie Kulikowski – For service to community health.
- Brian Peter Landers, AFSM – For service to the community of Kalgoorlie-Boulder.
- Murray Vincent Lanyon – For service to horticulture.
- Tasma Lorraine Lapham – For service to Australian rules football.
- Betty Patricia Laverty – For service to music through pipe bands.
- Joseph Bernard Lavery – For service to the community through emergency response services, and to veterans.
- Desmond Graeme Lawson – For service to the community through a range of organisations and initiatives.
- Nicholas Lee – For service to the community through the not-for-profit sector.
- Leonard Thomas Leete – For service to the community through emergency response organisations.
- Lina Lei – For service to sport as a gold medallist at the Tokyo Paralympic Games 2020.
- The late Albert Leslie Le-Merton – For service to veterans, and to the community.
- Elisabeth Claire Lenders – For service to education.
- Dr Milton Lewis – For service to community health.
- Stephen John Loane – For service to the livestock industry, and to local government.
- Walter John Lord – For service to the community through a range of organisations.
- Vanessa Low – For service to sport as a gold medallist at the Tokyo Paralympic Games 2020.
- Adrienne Louise Lowe – For service to surf lifesaving.
- Wayne Aden Lyne – For service to the community through emergency response organisations.
- Janet Lesley MacFadyen – For service to the community through charitable organisations.
- Andrew Donald MacGregor – For service to the community of Break O'Day.
- Donald Rees Magarey – For service to the law, and to music.
- Keran Thomas Maguire – For service to the community of Rockhampton.
- Louise Mahoney – For service to the community through charitable organisations.
- Mary Mangos – For service to the Greek community of South Australia.
- The late Laurence Hedley March – For service to surf lifesaving.
- Mei-Lin Marlin – For service to the multicultural communities of New South Wales.
- Nicholas Marshall – For service to surf lifesaving.
- John Martin – For service to radio broadcast media.
- Logan Martin – For service to sport as a gold medallist at the Tokyo Olympic Games 2020.
- Ross Alexander Martin – For service to cricket.
- William Michael Martin – For service to sport as a gold medallist at the Tokyo Paralympic Games 2020.
- Kevin Charles Mason, PSM – For service to conservation and the environment.
- Wayne Leslie Mason – For service to the community in a range of roles.
- Emeritus Professor Laurence Edward Mather – For services to anaesthesia and pain management as a research scientist and educator.
- Brian Leslie Matthews – For service to the community through a range of organisations.
- Carol Matthews – For service to community mental health.
- Marion Matthews – For service to the visual arts.
- Marjorie Eleanor Maxwell – For service to the community of Finley.
- John Winston May – For service to the community of Townsville.
- John Clyde Mayo – For service to surf lifesaving.
- James Robert McClelland, BM – For service to the Royal Life Saving Society.
- Professor Elizabeth Anne McCusker – For service to medicine as a neurologist, particularly in the field of Huntington's disease.
- The late Allan Edward McDonald – For service to the community through a range of roles.
- Anthony Peter McDonald – For service to engineering, and to the community.
- Sister Barbara McDonough – For service to education, and to the church.
- Malcolm John McEachern – For service to the community through a range of organisations.
- Robert Paul McFarlane – For service to the community of Grafton.
- Helen Jean McIntosh – For service to the community of Beechworth.
- Annabelle Karri McIntyre – For service to sport as a gold medallist at the Tokyo Olympic Games 2020.
- Major Kenneth John McKay, RFD – For service to veterans, and to history preservation.
- Mary Carmel McKenna – For service to the community through a range of organisations.
- Sharlene McKenzie – For service to the Indigenous communities of South East Sydney.
- Kaylee Rochelle McKeown – For service to sport as a gold medallist at the Tokyo Olympic Games 2020.
- Margot Eileen McKinney – For service to the arts as a designer and through charitable organisations.
- Dr Robin Clifford McLachlan – For service to the community of Bathurst.
- Lesley Margaret McNee – For service to the community of Koorda and surrounds.
- Douglas Philip Melville – For service to education, and to youth.
- Detective Sergeant Mark Anthony Meredith – For service to the community through a range of organisations.
- Cornelia Sjannete (Connie) Merritt – For service to the community of New South Wales.
- Dr Anthony Michaelson – For service to the community through alcohol and drug use prevention programs.
- Lindy Jane Milburn – For service to fashion sustainability.
- Robert Ian Millar – For service to the community through a range of organisations.
- Lynette Millett – For service to animal welfare.
- Brian John Milner – For service to veterans and their families.
- Doreen Mina – For service to the community through hospital auxiliaries.
- Geoffrey Lynn Minett – For service to the community of Nambucca Valley.
- Barbara Joy Morris – For service to softball.
- Christine Elizabeth Morris – For service to the community, particularly through the church.
- Robyn Valerie Morris – For service to music through a range of organisations.
- Jessica Elizabeth Morrison – For service to sport as a gold medallist at the Tokyo Olympic Games 2020.
- Dr Ann Morrow – For service to the community through a range of organisations, and to local government.
- Lauretta Morton – For service to the museums and galleries sector.
- Dr Bradley Charles Murphy – For service to community health.
- Carol Ann Murphy – For service to netball.
- Lesley Murphy – For service to community health.
- Rosemary Nater – For service to landcare management, and to the community of Moyston.
- Professor Bronwyn Glynis Naylor – For service to tertiary education, and to the law.
- Robert James Newton – For service to the communities of the West and Central West of New South Wales.
- Associate Professor Mehrdad Nikfarjam – For service to medicine in the field of pancreas and biliary surgery.
- Barbara Dawn Norrish – For service to horse sports.
- Peter Nosow – For service to horticulture, and to the community.
- Carmel Bernadette O'Brien – For service to nursing.
- Mollie Grace O'Callaghan – For service to sport as a gold medallist at the Tokyo Olympic Games 2020.
- Vicki O'Donnell – For service to the Indigenous community of Western Australia.
- Terence Michael O'Grady – For service to the community through charitable organisations.
- Desmond O'Keeffe – For service to horse racing.
- Ken William Oliver – For service to lawn bowls.
- Pam O'Neill – For service to horse racing as a jockey.
- Susan Jane O'Neill – For service to the international community through medical and humanitarian programs.
- Lawrence William Orchard – For service to music as an educator, and to the community.
- Kevin John O'Rourke – For service to the law.
- Barbara Geraldine Osborne – For service to the community through charitable organisations.
- Rosemary Osman – For service to the community through a range of organisations.
- Hilkat Ozgun – For service to the Turkish community of Victoria.
- Keegan Christopher Palmer – For service to sport as a gold medallist at the Tokyo Olympic Games 2020.
- The late Leonie Palmer – For service to the Indigenous community of Alice Springs.
- Angela Pangallo – For service to people with neuro-developmental disorders.
- Robert Pataki – For service to the design industry.
- Simone Suzanne Patterson – For service to the community through social welfare organisations.
- Raymond John Pearson – For service to veterans and their families.
- Dr Gino Pecoraro – For service to medicine as a gynaecologist.
- Ren Michael Pedersen – For service to the community through charitable organisations.
- The late Beverley Julia Pepper – For service to the local community of Coleraine.
- Edward Perati – For service to the community through music.
- Marija Perejma – For service to Latvian community of South Australia.
- Elizabeth Beatrice Perkins – For service to the community through a range of roles.
- Monica Leith Perry – For service to youth, and to the community.
- Peter Warren Perry – For service to the museums and galleries sector.
- Joan Peters – For service to the performing arts, particularly to film.
- Judith Ann Peters – For service to local government, and to the community of Bundaberg.
- Emily Petricola – For service to sport as a gold medallist at the Tokyo Paralympic Games 2020.
- Carol Pettersen – For service to the Indigenous community of Western Australia.
- John Brendon Phillips – For service to the finance sector, and to the community.
- Billy Pinnell – For service to radio broadcast media.
- Ann Elizabeth Pioro – For service to veterans and their families.
- Peter Pioro – For service to veterans and their families.
- Colin James Piper – For service to music.
- Silvio Pitruzzello – For service to dairy and primary industry.
- Adrian Robert Pobke – For service to tennis, and to the community.
- Peter Hamilton Polain – For service to the community through a range of roles.
- Dr Susan Jennifer Pollard – For service to the Catholic Church of Australia.
- Rosemary Popa – For service to sport as a gold medallist at the Tokyo Olympic Games 2020.
- Dr Harald Alexander Pope – For service to medicine through a range of roles.
- Ben Popham – For service to sport as a gold medallist at the Tokyo Paralympic Games 2020.
- Cheryl Porter – For service to Indigenous community of New South Wales.
- Leslie James Power – For service to motor sports.
- The late Brian Powyer – For service to the community through history preservation organisations.
- William Mathew Pratt – For service to the community of Geelong.
- Graham Frederick Priestnall – For service to the defence industry.
- Heather May Prior – For service to horticulture, particularly through floral art.
- Elizabeth Helen Pullar – For service to the performing arts, particularly to theatre.
- Alice Pung – For service to literature.
- Wendy Joan Purkiss – For service to the community through charitable organisations.
- Alexander Richard Purnell – For service to sport as a gold medallist at the Tokyo Olympic Games 2020.
- Vicki May Purnell – For service to the community.
- Louise Anas Quinn – For service to the community through a range of roles.
- Professor Helge Hans Rasmussen – For service to medicine as a cardiologist.
- Julius Caesar Re – For service to football.
- Mark Reay – For service to music through marching and brass bands.
- Amanda Reid – For service to sport as a gold medallist at the Tokyo Paralympic Games 2020.
- Joan Reid – For service to conservation and the environment.
- David Sinclair Renton – For service to surf lifesaving.
- Helen Margaret Rhoades – For service to the law, particularly to policy reform and legal research.
- Kim Beresford Rickards – For service to rugby union.
- Heather Maree Ridge – For service to the community through a range of roles.
- Robert James Riordan – For service to the community through a range of organisations.
- Shirley May Rixon – For service to the community of the Sapphire Coast.
- Dominique Francoise Robinson – For service to the community through charitable organisations.
- Jann Robinson – For service to education.
- The late Hugh Arthur Rogers – For service to aged welfare.
- Virginia Rogers – For service to the community through a range of roles.
- Barry Edward Roots – For service to secondary education.
- Dr Walter Geoffrey Roper – For service to the community through a range of roles.
- Brian Rudder – For service to rugby union.
- Allison Blanche Rumble – For service to the community of Bathurst.
- Neil Rumble – For service to the community of Bathurst.
- Reverend Colin William Rush – For service to the community of Wagga Wagga.
- The late Leslie David Russell – For service to the community of Whittlesea.
- Patricia Elvie Russell – For service to the community through charitable organisations.
- Peter McKay Russell – For service to the community through asbestos awareness.
- Peter Ryan – For service to the broadcast media as a journalist.
- William Ryan – For service to sport as a gold medallist at the Tokyo Olympic Games 2020.
- Dr Ramin Samali – For service to medicine as a urologist.
- Rowan Sawers – For service to Australian rules football.
- Wolfgang Schoch – For service to people living with cancer, and to the community.
- Michelle Scott – For service to the community through social welfare organisations.
- Lynette Joan Serventy – For service to conservation and the environment.
- Moya Sharp – For service to community history.
- Lydia Sharpin – For service to the community through a range of organisations.
- David Shepherd – For service to secondary education.
- Lynette Joy Shepherd – For service to secondary education.
- Elizabeth Anne Shepherdson – For service to the community of Margaret River.
- Mark Aloysius Sheridan – For service to community health.
- Neil Ernest Shields – For service to the community through social welfare organisations.
- Dr Arnold Shmerling – For service to the Jewish community.
- Helena Lane Shmerling – For service to the community through a range of roles.
- Dr Deborah Simmons – For service to medicine through a range of roles.
- Mary Louise Simpson – For service to conservation and the environment, and to the arts.
- Pamela Jean Simpson – For service to the community of Bourke.
- Robert John Sinclair – For service to the community through a range of organisations.
- Fay Pamela Skuthorpe – For service to the community as a hospital volunteer.
- Michael Francis Slocum – For service to the performing arts as an entertainer.
- James Danforth Small – For service to surf lifesaving.
- Charles David Smith – For service to commercial forestry sector.
- Juliet Maree Smith – For service to the community through emergency response organisations.
- June Montgomery (Monty) Smith – For service to the community through history preservation organisations.
- Robyn June Smith – For service to people with disability through sport.
- Ronald Charles Smith – For service to the media and communications sector.
- The late Sidney Lionel Smith, AFSM – For service to emergency response organisations, and to the community.
- Sophie Alice Smith – For service to the community through charitable organisations.
- Benedict Soler – For service to the Maltese community.
- Heather Spence – For service to nursing.
- Julia Spicer – For service to the community through a range of organisations.
- Dr Edmund Bruce Spork – For service to the community through a range of organisations.
- Caroline Fiona Stacey – For service to the performing arts through administrative roles.
- The late David Hugh Stacey – For service to veterans, and to the community of Strathalbyn.
- Dr Brian Laurence Stagoll – For service to medicine as a psychiatrist.
- Dr Harry Stalewski – For service to medicine as a paediatrician surgeon and urologist.
- Clive Alfred Stebbins – For service to the international community, and to youth.
- Leone Dean Steele – For service to the community of Bathurst.
- Lucy Stephan – For service to sport as a gold medallist at the Tokyo Olympic Games 2020.
- Shirley Stephen – For service to swimming.
- Dr Ian Stewart – For service to medicine through a range of roles.
- Juliana Elsie Stonor – For service to swimming.
- Izaac Keith Stubblety-Cook – For service to sport as a gold medallist at the Tokyo Olympic Games 2020.
- Denise Elizabeth Sullivan – For service to the community of Tamworth.
- Edmund John Sullivan – For service to Australian rules football.
- Julie Sutton – For service to the community of the Northern Beaches.
- Dr Jillian Claire Tabart – For service to the Uniting Church in Australia.
- Ian Arthur Tate – For service to historic motor sports.
- Gary Thomas Taylor – For service to veterans and their families.
- Dr James Taylor – For service to emergency medicine, and to the community.
- Faye Maree Temple – For service to sonography.
- John Ronald Thomas – For service to rugby league.
- Lynette Kae Thomas – For service to hockey.
- Jennifer Mary Thompson – For service to the community through social welfare organisations.
- Kay Thompson – For service to softball.
- Merridy Gaye Thompson – For service to youth through the Australian Air Force Cadets.
- Judy Elizabeth Thonell – For service to music through education.
- Pamela Zoe Thorman – For service to the community of Albury.
- Margaret Ruth Thorsborne – For service to education.
- Brianna Throssell – For service to sport as a gold medallist at the Tokyo Olympic Games 2020.
- Clive Tilsley – For service to literature.
- The late David Timms – For service to the minerals sector.
- Ariarne Elizabeth Titmus – For service to sport as a gold medallist at the Tokyo Olympic Games 2020.
- Stephen James Toomey – For service to the community, particularly through the church.
- Madeline Jane Townsend – For service to conservation and the environment.
- Heather Tredinnick – For service to music through choirs.
- Douglas Weymouth Treloar – For service to music through community bands.
- Lynda Jane Trembath – For service to community health.
- Helen Joy Trigg – For service to the community through a range of roles.
- Annette Turner – For service to the community through a range of roles.
- Spencer Turrin – For service to sport as a gold medallist at the Tokyo Olympic Games 2020.
- Nicholas Gordon Underwood – For service to the community, and to travel writing.
- Henk Van Den Heuvel – For service to the building industry.
- Jude Van Der Merwe – For service to the visual arts through administrative roles.
- Jean van der Westhuyzen – For service to sport as a gold medallist at the Tokyo Olympic Games 2020.
- Bastiaan John Van Dongen – For service to the Dutch community of Sydney.
- Pauline June Venning – For service to the community of Burra.
- Mark Vergano – For service to sport as an administrator.
- Pamella Vernon – For service to social welfare.
- Dr Furio John Virant – For service to medicine through a range of roles.
- Mark Wainwright – For service to veterans.
- Peter John Walsh – For service to the community through social welfare organisations and initiatives.
- Dr John William Wamsley – For service to conservation and the environment.
- Lynette Wilma Warren – For service to the Indigenous community of Bendigo.
- Pamela Dawn Watkins – For service to the community through a range of organisations.
- Karen Waud – For service to sport as an administrator and player.
- Matthew Wearn – For service to sport as a gold medallist at the Tokyo Olympic Games 2020.
- The late Lyndon Meredith Webb – For service to local government, and to the community of Sale.
- Jarrod Linkston Wheatley – For service to youth.
- Brian Allan Wheeler – For service to veterans and their families.
- Janice Whelan – For service to music as an accompanist.
- Antony Alfred White – For service to the community of the Hunter Valley region.
- Peter Michael White – For service to public administration.
- Mervyn Stuart Whiting – For service to veterans and their families, and to the community.
- Janice Whyte – For service to the community of Marree.
- Jennifer Anne Williams – For service to women's sport, and to sports psychology.
- Jillian Gwyneth Willoughby – For service to the community through police organisations.
- Jennifer Ann Wills – For service to local government, to gender equality, and to the community.
- Elizabeth D'arcy Wilson – For service to public administration in South Australia.
- Elizabeth Jean Wilson – For service to the community through hospital auxiliaries.
- John Cunningham Wilson – For service to social welfare organisations.
- Stephen Karl Wilson – For service to herpetology.
- Dr Conrad Edward Winer – For service to musculoskeletal medicine.
- John David Winning – For service to sailing.
- Margaret Anne Winterfield – For service to veterans and their families.
- Bruce Geoffrey Wood – For service to cricket.
- Frantisek Jan Wositzky – For service to the performing arts, particularly through theatre.
- Angela Wright – For service to sport and outdoor recreation.
- Qian Yang – For service to sport as a gold medallist at the Tokyo Paralympic Games 2020.
- Gary Young – For service to the performing arts, particularly to theatre.
- Alan Young Najukpayi – For service to the Indigenous community of Yarralin.
- John Francis Ziesing – For service to hockey, and to the community.
- Dr Lois Beverly Zweck – For service to community history.

==== Military Division ====
Navy

- Warrant Officer Chad Buhlmann – For meritorious performance of duty in the fields of Maritime Explosive Ordnance Disposal and Clearance Diving.
- Warrant Officer Dane Lawson Field – For meritorious performance of duty in the field of Naval Engineering.
- Chief Petty Officer Janelle Margaret Scrase – For meritorious service in the field of personnel management in the Royal Australian Navy.
- Captain Troy Van Tienhoven, RAN – For meritorious service to the Royal Australian Navy in the fields of Maritime Command and Training.
- Warrant Officer Tagan James Wright – For meritorious service in the field of maritime Communications and Information Systems capability support.

Army

- Warrant Officer Class One Bradley Norman Foster, CSM – For meritorious service in Instructor and Company Sergeant Major appointments at the Royal Military College Duntroon; the Officer Cadet School of New Zealand; and the 6th Battalion, the Royal Australian Regiment.
- Captain Dennis Ralph Magennis – For meritorious service as the Manager of the Australian Army Military Intelligence Museum, and as the Regimental Sergeant Major.
- Warrant Officer Class One Lee Maloney – For meritorious service in support of the Australian Army CH-47 Chinook capability.
- Warrant Officer Class One Mark Jason Newell – For meritorious service as a Warrant Officer Class One, Operator Unit Supply serving in Special Operations Command and Army Headquarters.
- Warrant Officer Class One David Carl Poulsen – For meritorious service as the Artificer Sergeant Major of the 7th Combat Service Support Battalion and Artificer Sergeant Major for the Land Maintenance System within the Directorate of Technical Regulation and Evaluation - Army.
- Warrant Officer Class One Andrew Stephen Remin, CSM – For meritorious service in ab initio Officer Training for the Australian Defence Force.

==== Honorary ====
- Douglas Roy Denby – For service to people with disability through sport.
- Nicholas Duncan – For service to animal welfare.
- Sandra Trimingham – For service to the community through alcohol and drug use prevention groups.
- Paula Denise Wagg – For service to horse racing.
- Alexandra Charlotte Watson – For service to information technology.

== Meritorius Service ==
=== Public Service Medal (PSM) ===
Public Service Medal ribbon

Federal

- James Victor Baxter – For outstanding public service as Australia's chief negotiator for the Regional Comprehensive Economic Partnership Free Trade Agreement.
- Michelle Frances Baxter – For outstanding public service to the health and safety of Australian workplaces and the community, particularly during the COVID-19 pandemic.
- Shona Jane Blewett – For outstanding public service to education and teacher training in Earth Sciences, and for leadership in education innovations.
- Caragh Maria Cassoni – For outstanding public service through leadership in the Australian Government's response to COVID-19, particularly in residential aged care.
- Kylie Maree Crane – For outstanding public service through contributions to the Disability Taskforce, and to the Early Childhood Education and Care Relief Package, during the COVID-19 pandemic.
- Paul Jason Creech – For outstanding public service to community health, particularly through ensuring access to telehealth services during the COVID-19 pandemic.
- Tracy Creech – For outstanding public service in establishing survivorfocussed support services for the National Redress Scheme and for guiding instrumental improvements.
- Kim Ann Crimmins – For outstanding public service through support for victims of crime and Australians impacted by disaster.
- Justine Nicole Curnow – For outstanding public service in leading the assistance packages to sustain and revive the arts and entertainment sectors through the COVID-19 pandemic.
- Bronwyn Louise Field – For outstanding public service managing national collaboration to ensure hospital capacity and industry viability, and a leading role in the return of Australians from overseas.
- Travis William Haslam – For outstanding public service managing the National Medical Stockpile particularly in ensuring sufficient PPE for Australian health care workers.
- Dr Stephanie Elizabeth Hodson, CSC – For outstanding public service through the provision of mental health counselling services to the veteran community.
- Vanessa Jane Holben – For outstanding public service through leadership of the National Coordination Mechanism as part of the Australian Government's response to the COVID-19 pandemic.
- Nicole Jarvis – For outstanding public service through contributions to the successful establishment and operation of the Victorian Aged Care Response Centre.
- Megan Lees – For outstanding public service leading Defence's national response to COVID-19 and the provision of policy and communications advice to the Australian Defence Force community.
- Alice Ruth Linacre – For outstanding public service in the provision and management of legal services and resources to support the Government's response to critical events, including the COVID-19 pandemic.
- David Anthony Luchetti – For outstanding public service to science and industry policy in Australia, particularly in the Square Kilometre Array project.
- Sonja Marsic – For outstanding public service to the Commonwealth through the provision of legal services, particularly in relation to anti-money laundering and counter-terrorism financing legislation.
- Ivan Roger Neville – For outstanding public service in improving labour market policies and responsiveness to labour market developments, particularly to address unemployment during the COVID-19 pandemic recovery.
- Kathryn Louise Paton – For outstanding public service through developing the policy and processes that enabled critical income support payments to Australians impacted by COVID-19 restrictions.
- John William Shepherd – For outstanding public service through the development, design and implementation of the Single Touch Payroll program.
- Andrew Edward Snashall – For outstanding public service to the Defence Community, particularly in delivering improvements of military justice processes for Australian Defence Force Members.
- Christopher Hayden Teal – For outstanding public service in developing and establishing globally recognised best practice guidelines to counter foreign interference in the Australian university sector.
- Dr Stephanie Alice Williams – For outstanding public service in planning and implementing the Australian Government's vaccine response in the Indo-Pacific region.

New South Wales

- Stephanie Barker – For outstanding public service to urban planning in New South Wales.
- Kathryn Teresa Boyd – For outstanding public service in the provision of legal advice as General Counsel in New South Wales, particularly during the 2019–2020 bushfire season and COVID-19 pandemic.
- Gemma Anne Broderick – For outstanding public service to legal and regulatory services in public health in New South Wales.
- Carmel Mary Donnelly – For outstanding public service to regulatory reforms in New South Wales.
- Professor Dominic Edmund Dwyer – For outstanding public service as an infectious disease expert and public health advisor in New South Wales.
- Mark Patrick Greentree – For outstanding public service to improved digital learning and innovation to support education in New South Wales.
- Noelene Fay Hyde – For outstanding public service to local government in New South Wales.
- Matthew John McFarlane – For outstanding public service to emergency management in New South Wales, particularly in response to the 2019–2020 bushfires.
- Dr Judith Perl – For outstanding public service to drink and drug driving research and road safety in New South Wales.
- Sandra Lee Rothwell – For outstanding public service to Revenue New South Wales, particularly through the COVID-19 pandemic.
- Margaret Ann (Anne) Skewes – For outstanding public service to the New South Wales Government and people of New South Wales.
- John James Tansey – For outstanding public service to building regulation in New South Wales.

Victoria

- Margaret Joan Allan – For outstanding public service to policy and program delivery in regional Victoria.
- Terence George Bennett – For outstanding public service to education in Victoria.
- Rosa Billi – For outstanding public service to community health in Victoria, particularly in the area of gambling harm.
- Colin James Dobson – For outstanding public service to education in Victoria.
- Dr John Desmond Koehn – For outstanding public service to conservation and freshwater management in Victoria.
- Lee Alexander Miezis – For outstanding public service to policy, regulation and service delivery in Victoria, particularly in the area of environmental sustainability.
- Sarah Jane Stephen – For outstanding public service to strategic policy reform and delivery in Victoria, particularly in the areas of climate change and energy.
- Elizabeth Anne Williams – For outstanding public service to electoral management in Victoria.

Queensland

- Dr Gordon Paul Guymer – For outstanding public service in the areas of scientific investigations, botanical research, policy reform relating to biodiversity conservation and natural resource management.
- Jasmina Joldic – For outstanding public service through delivery of critical functions and health policies that have contributed to the successful COVID-19 response in Queensland.
- Paul Thomas Martyn – For outstanding public service in the areas of Queensland export, global investment opportunities and leading the Queensland Government COVID-19 Response and Recovery Taskforce.
- Lyndell Sellars – For outstanding public service to education in Queensland, particularly in response to COVID-19.
- Julie Steel – For outstanding public service through court innovations for Queensland.
- Jeffrey Donald Stewart-Harris – For outstanding public service to local and state government in Queensland.

Western Australia

- Anthony Michael Kannis – For outstanding public service to transport and infrastructure reform, particularly through METRONET.
- Dr Mark William Sweetingham – For outstanding public service to scientific research and development of the grains industry in Western Australia.
- Anna Maria Wyatt – For outstanding public service to improving education and health outcomes for Aboriginal people and the state of Western Australia.

South Australia

- Mark Joseph Connelly – For outstanding public service to achieving outcomes for the Anangu communities.
- Sara Elizabeth Fleming – For outstanding public service to the development and provision of Paediatric Palliative Care Services.
- Kirk Richardson – For outstanding public service in developing and implementing key projects for the City of Onkaparinga.

Australian Capital Territory

- Sara White Burns – For outstanding public service, in particular to improving cross border governance and the modernisation of cabinet processes.
- Mary Louise Toohey – For outstanding public service to law reform in the Australian Capital Territory and supporting the response to the COVID-19 pandemic.

Northern Territory

- Kathleen Robinson – For outstanding public service to the Northern Territory Public Sector.
- Dr Ian Richard Scrimgeour – For outstanding public service to geoscience in the Northern Territory.

=== Australian Police Medal (APM) ===
Australian Police Medal ribbon

Federal

- Detective Sergeant Louise Margaret Denley
- Detective Superintendent David Roland Nelson
- Detective Superintendent Anita Maree Van Hilst

New South Wales

- Detective Inspector Patrick Joseph Crass
- Detective Superintendent Robert Anthony Critchlow
- Inspector Tina Frances Davies
- Detective Senior Sergeant Stephen John Day
- Detective Superintendent Jayne Doherty
- Detective Superintendent Paul Jonathon Glinn
- Superintendent Andrew James Holland
- Inspector Terry John Holt
- Sergeant Lawrence George Lucas

Victoria

- Detective Inspector Anthony Carluke Cecchin
- Commander Michael Joseph Frewen
- Superintendent Simon David Humphrey
- Inspector Mark Anthony Keen
- Superintendent Kelly Anne Lawson
- Superintendent Sharon Aileen McKinnon
- Senior Sergeant Bradley John Mason
- Leading Senior Constable David Anthony Rook
- Inspector Caroline Peta West

Queensland

- Assistant Commissioner Brian Desmond Connors
- Inspector Michael William Dowie
- Assistant Commissioner Katherine Louise Innes
- Senior Sergeant Peter Calvin McFarlane
- Senior Sergeant Craig James Shepherd
- Senior Sergeant Heather Anne Wallace
- Senior Sergeant James Charles Whitehead

Western Australia

- Inspector Jeffrey Victor Andrijasevich
- Sergeant Rulan Kate Carr
- Commander Darren Francis Seiveright
- Inspector Dean Trovarello
- Detective Superintendent Rodney James Wilde

South Australia

- Chief Superintendent John De Candia
- Detective Chief Inspector Denise Kaye Gray
- Senior Sergeant First Class Craig Gregory Wolfe

Tasmania

- Detective Sergeant Shane Anthony Sinnitt
- Commander Debbie Jane Williams

Northern Territory

- Sergeant Ian Davie
- Commander Matthew Wayne Hoollamby

=== Australian Fire Service Medal (AFSM) ===
Australian Fire Service Medal ribbon

New South Wales

- David Ian Bosworth
- Donald Stuart Farleigh
- Jane Louise Hollier
- Peter Craig Jacobs
- Tara Jane Lal
- Jennifer Joy Lawther
- Brian Edwin McKenzie
- Jonathon Stuart McKenzie
- Christopher Ronald Nolan
- David James O'Donnell
- Christopher Helmut Petrikas

Victoria

- Ernest John Clarke
- Graeme William Higgs
- Gillian Teresa Metz
- Brad Quinn
- Wayne Andrew Rigg

Queensland

- William Robert Brand
- Assistant Commissioner David Vincent Hermann

South Australia

- Malcolm Alan Amos
- Timothy Cooper
- Fiona Le Nore Dunstan
- Andrew James Higgins
- Guy Stephen Uren

Tasmania

- Matthew James Buck
- Graeme Cedric Jones
- Ian Charles Sauer, OAM

Australian Capital Territory

- Brendan Lyal Cross

=== Ambulance Service Medal (ASM) ===
Ambulance Service Medal ribbon

New South Wales

- Gary William Hendry
- Kirsten Michelle Linklater
- Wayne John McKenna
- Brett Kristian Standaloft

Victoria

- Josephine Mary Brookes
- Ian James Dunell
- Bernard Dominic Goss
- Gavan John Keane
- Dr Ziad Nehme
- Frances Lorraine Scott
- Glenice Ann Winter

Queensland

- Rita Joy Kelly
- Crad Richard Smith

South Australia

- Nichole Bastian
- Lawrence Sylvester Tomney

Western Australia

- Sarel De Koker
- Clifford Leonard Fishlock
- Jacqueline Louise Mackay

Tasmania

- Samantha Louise Allender
- Vicki Anne Knowles
- Dr Peter Frederick Mulholland

Northern Territory

- Dr Felix Ho Lam Ho

=== Emergency Services Medal (ESM) ===
Emergency Services Medal ribbon

New South Wales

- Stewart Andrew Bailey
- William James Blakeman
- John James Keough
- Richard Arthur Lissenden
- Sonya Maree Marks
- Garry Meredith
- Anthony Brian Rettke
- Wayne Gregory Rizzi
- Mark Wayne Spencer

Victoria

- Raelene Billingsley
- Ronald John Fitch
- Russell Lyle Lemke
- Paul James Lunny
- Keith George O'Brien
- Anthony John White
- Howard Willoughby

Queensland

- Jason Tony Daniels
- Keith Peter Williams

Tasmania

- Rose-Anne Maree Emmerton
- Graydon Carl O'Halloran
- Adrian Robert Webster

Northern Territory

- Seth Colby Dugdell

=== Australian Corrections Medal (ACM) ===
Australian Corrections Medal ribbon

New South Wales

- Derek Thomas Brindle
- Evan Douglas Dougall
- John Martin Harrison
- Cathy Petrovski
- Sara Wilcher

Victoria

- Assistant Commissioner Jennifer Ann Hosking
- Megan Kathryn McClelland
- Acting Commissioner Larissa Jane Strong

Queensland

- Cassandra Cowie
- Bernard Krushe

Western Australia

- James Hosie
- Christine Anne Laird
- Timothy Louis Sanders
- James Anatoli Schilo

South Australia

- Jamie Edward Goldsmith
- Troy Procter

Tasmania

- Rebecca Jane Devine

=== Australian Intelligence Medal (AIM) ===
Australian Intelligence Medal ribbon

Federal

- Catherine H
- Mike Hughes
- Joseph K
- Kitamura Shigeru
- John M
- Dr John Moss
- Michelle P
- Dr Catherine Willis

== Distinguished and Conspicuous Service ==
=== Distinguished Service Cross (DSC) ===
Distinguished Service Cross ribbon

- Major General Chris Field, AM, CSC – For distinguished command and leadership in warlike operations as the Deputy Commanding General – Operations, United States Army Central and on operational service in the Middle East Region over the period March 2020 to October 2021.

=== Distinguished Service Medal (DSM) ===
Distinguished Service Medal ribbon

- Lieutenant Colonel M – For distinguished leadership in warlike operations as a Task Force Commander on Operation OKRA from July to December 2020.
- Brigadier Edward John Smeaton – For distinguished leadership in warlike operations as the North Atlantic Treaty Organisation Deputy Branch Head Operational Sustainment, Resolute Support Mission and Commander Task Group Afghanistan from December 2019 to October 2020.
- Captain T – For distinguished leadership in warlike operations as the Special Operations Advisory Team Commander, enabling the 1st Iraqi Special Operations Forces Brigade, while part of a deployed Task Force on Operation OKRA from June to December 2020.

=== Commendation for Distinguished Service ===
Commendation for Distinguished Service ribbon

- Major A – For distinguished performance of duties in warlike operations as Deputy Commander and Director of Operations of a deployed Task Force in support of Operations AUGURY, OKRA, and HIGHROAD from April to December 2020.
- Colonel Anthony Gawain Duus, CSC – For distinguished performance of duties in warlike conditions while as the Chief of Current Plans, Combined Joint Task Force Headquarters of Operation INHERENT RESOLVE, while force assigned to Operation OKRA from 18 November 2019 to 14 October 2020, Iraq and Kuwait.
- Major General Stephen John Jobson, AM, CSC – For distinguished performance of duties in warlike operations as the North Atlantic Treaty Organisation Chief Combined Joint Operations (CJ3), Resolute Support Mission on Operation HIGHROAD from December 2019 to October 2020.
- Brigadier Simon Timothy Johnstone, CSC – For distinguished performance of duties in warlike operations as the Director of Strategy and Plans Combined Joint Force Operation Inherent Resolve and the Australian Senior National Representative on Operation OKRA from November 2019 to December 2020.
- Lance Corporal M – For distinguished performance of duties in warlike operations as a lead advisor within the Special Operations Advisory Team, enabling the 1st Iraqi Special Operations Forces Brigade, as part of a deployed Task Force on Operation OKRA from June to December 2020.
- Colonel M – For distinguished performance of duties in warlike operations as the Director of Logistics, North Atlantic Treaty Organisation Special Operations Component Command – Afghanistan, Operation HIGHROAD from September 2019 to September 2020.
- Colonel Eric Matheus Modderman – For distinguished performance of duties in warlike operations as the Senior Advisor to the Deputy Minister of Support in the Ministry of Interior Affairs, Kabul, Afghanistan during Operation HIGHROAD from September 2019 to September 2020.
- Colonel James Howard Murray – For distinguished performance of duties in warlike operations as the Deputy Commander Train Advise and Assist Command – South, Kandahar, Afghanistan on Operation HIGHROAD from January to October 2020.
- Colonel Spencer Norris – For distinguished performance of duties in warlike operations as the staff officer Combined Joint Operations, Plans and Training, Combined Security Transition Command – Afghanistan in Kabul, Afghanistan on Operation Highroad from January to December 2020.
- Private O – For distinguished performance of duties in warlike operations as the Intelligence Plans Manager and Targets Manager of a deployed Task Force under Operations AUGURY and OKRA from April to December 2020.
- Brigadier Jane Maree Spalding, AM – For distinguished performance of duties in warlike operations as the Commander Task Group Afghanistan on Operation HIGHROAD in Afghanistan from August 2018 to March 2019.

=== Bar to the Conspicuous Service Cross (CSC and Bar) ===
Conspicuous Service Cross and Bar ribbon

- Captain Simon John Bateman, CSC, RAN – For outstanding achievement in the development of the Australia-India bilateral defence relationship as the Australian Defence Adviser to India.
- Commodore Craig Douglas Bourke, CSC, RAN – For outstanding devotion to duty to the Royal Australian Navy in the management of major shipbuilding programs.
- Major General Kathryn Jane Campbell, AO, CSC – For outstanding achievement as the Commander of the 2nd Division

=== Conspicuous Service Cross (CSC) ===
Conspicuous Service Cross ribbon

- Captain Dean Robert Commons, RAN – For outstanding achievement in reforming intelligence support for Australian Defence Force operations.
- Commander Kelly Anne Hayward, RAN – For outstanding achievement as the Navy Women's Strategic Advisor.
- Commander Michael John Holman, RAN – For outstanding achievement as the Senior Health Intelligence Analyst, Department of Defence.
- Captain Katherine Ella Tindall, RAN – For outstanding achievement in Australian Defence Force strategic health policy and leadership of the Defence coronavirus (COVID-19) pandemic response.
- Lieutenant Colonel Tracy Merlene Allison – For outstanding devotion to duty in the personnel management of Army's Senior Officers.
- Lieutenant Colonel Jeremy Bechtel – For outstanding achievement as Staff Officer Grade One Current Networks.
- Captain Jyra Ayita Blake-Waller – For outstanding achievement as a Nursing Officer deployed with Joint Task Unit 629.2.3 Health Support Unit 1 during Operation COVID-19 ASSIST.
- Lieutenant Colonel Gareth Richard Bowering – For outstanding achievement as the officer in charge of the Operation Asia-Pacific Economic Cooperation 2018 ASSIST Liaison Advice and Assistance Joint Task Group.
- Major General Jake Ellwood, DSC, AM – For outstanding achievement as Commander of the 1st Division, Commander Joint Task Force 637 and Commander Deployable Joint Force Headquarters.
- Lieutenant Colonel Dean James Falvey – For outstanding achievement in the development of armoured fighting vehicle capabilities in the Australian Army.
- Lieutenant Colonel Damon Carl Higginbotham – For outstanding achievement as Commanding Officer Health Support Unit 1 deployed to Victoria during Operation COVID-19 ASSIST.
- Colonel David Graham Hughes – For outstanding achievement as the Colonel Plans of the 2nd Division from January 2018 until December 2020 and as Commander Joint Task Group 629.5.
- Lieutenant Colonel Kenneth Royston Martin – For outstanding achievement as Deputy Director Preparedness Requirements in the reform of Defence preparedness policy, direction and governance.
- Colonel Roger James McMurray – For outstanding achievement as the Colonel Operations of the Headquarters Forces Command Operations Branch.
- Major O – For outstanding achievement in Counter Weapons of Mass Destruction capability development for the Australian Defence Force.
- Lieutenant Colonel Samuel Keith Padman – For outstanding achievement as the Staff Officer Grade One, Centre for Australian Army Leadership, Headquarters Royal Military College of Australia.
- Major General Cheryl Ann Pearce, AM – For outstanding achievement as the Force Commander, United Nations Peacekeeping Force in Cyprus from 2019 to 2021.
- Colonel Robin Charles Smith – For outstanding achievement as the Staff Officer Grade One and Director Robotic and Autonomous Systems Implementation and Coordination Office, Future Land Warfare Branch, Army Headquarters.
- Colonel Edmund Francis Wunsch – For outstanding achievement as Commandant Defence Command Support Training Centre.
- Squadron Leader Melita Helen Beachley – For outstanding achievement in professional military education, training development, and implementation for the Royal Australian Air Force.
- Pilot Officer Valdi Chain – For outstanding achievement in capability development for the Australian Defence Force.
- Sergeant Taran Robert Diamond – For outstanding achievement in air combat armament development for the Australian Defence Force.
- Squadron Leader Kenneth John Edwards – For outstanding achievement in the infrastructure redevelopment of Royal Australian Air Force Base Tindal.
- Flight Sergeant Edward Mark Harvey – For outstanding achievement in international relations as the Assistant Air Force Attaché – Jakarta.
- Squadron Leader David John Savina, CSM – For outstanding achievement in E-7A Wedgetail airborne early warning and control capability development for the Australian Defence Force.

=== Conspicuous Service Medal (CSM) ===
Conspicuous Service Medal ribbon

- Chief Petty Officer Bradley Francis Bessell – For meritorious achievement and contributions to the Marine Technician Initial Employment Training Project Team, HMAS Cerberus.
- Lieutenant Commander Kate Carriage, RAN – For meritorious devotion to duty as the Naval Aviation Systems Program Office Deputy Chief Engineer between January 2019 and December 2020.
- Lieutenant Commander Katey Ann D'Costa, RAN – For meritorious devotion to duty as the Executive Officer of HMAS Harman during Operation Bushfire Assist and the COVID-19 pandemic in 2020.
- Leading Seaman Paul Anthony De Keizer – For meritorious devotion to duty as the Propulsion Supervisor for HMAS Choules.
- Petty Officer Thai-Britney Jade Demos – For meritorious devotion to duty during the establishment of the Navy Cryptologic Operator workforce capability within Fleet Command.
- Petty Officer Christopher David Gamble – For meritorious devotion to duty as an instructor in the field of Navy Survivability and Ship Safety.
- Commander Brandon Justin Ikimau, RAN – For meritorious devotion to duty in the fields of Navy Health and Amphibious Task Group operations.
- Lieutenant Michael David Loring, RAN – For meritorious devotion to duty as the Staff Officer Safety in Shore Force.
- Lieutenant Sarah Rachael Lucinsky, RAN – For meritorious devotion to duty as the Intelligence Officer in HMAS Parramatta.
- Petty Officer Douglas Kristan Rowan – For meritorious achievement in project management at Fleet Support Unit – South East.
- Leading Seaman Tenielle Katherine Walter – For meritorious achievement as the Catering Supervisor and Victualler in HMAS Sirius during REGIONAL PRESENCE DEPLOYMENT 2020.
- Sergeant Paul Andrew Burgan – For meritorious achievement as Sergeant Incident Management, Headquarters Forces Command.
- Warrant Officer Class Two Ian Robert Clapson – For meritorious achievement as a Range Control Officer and Technical Warrant Officer, Directorate of Operations and Training Area Management South Queensland.
- Major James Rohan Eling – For meritorious achievement as a Joint Task Group 629.2 Strategic Planner supporting Emergency Management Victoria State Control Centre during Operation COVID-19 ASSIST.
- Warrant Officer Class Two Graham Douglas Grieshaber – For meritorious devotion to duty as the Operations Warrant Officer of the Royal Military College of Australia.
- Lieutenant Colonel Daniel Peter Hauser – For meritorious achievement as the Assistant Defence Adviser Singapore and Brunei and Defence Adviser Brunei which significantly advances Australia's defence relationship with Brunei.
- Warrant Officer Class Two Danny Trevor Jacobsen – For meritorious achievement in the performance of duty as the Company Sergeant Major, Charlie Company, 51st Battalion, Far North Queensland Regiment.
- Warrant Officer Class Two Samuel Anthony Jenkins – For meritorious achievement in the design and development of digital safety processes for Army's current and future land-based fires.
- Warrant Officer Class Two Aaron Robert Johnston – For meritorious devotion to duty as the Senior Instructor and Subject Matter Expert Army Combative, Headquarters 7th Combat Brigade.
- Captain Cameron Alexander Laing – For meritorious devotion to duty as the Project Engineer for Fiji Projects at the 19th Chief Engineer Works.
- Lieutenant Colonel David Laurence Marshall – For meritorious devotion to duty in engineering and airworthiness management for the MRH90 helicopter at the Army Aviation Systems Program Office.
- Colonel John Marton Molnar – For meritorious achievement in the state emergency response to the Coronavirus pandemic in Victoria as the Senior Australian Defence Force Advisor to the State Control Centre.
- Warrant Officer Class Two David Andrew Owen – For meritorious devotion to duty as the Artificer Sergeant Major of the 4th Regiment, Royal Australian Artillery.
- Signaller P – For meritorious devotion to duty as a Communications Technician in Theatre Communications Group Rotation Ten on Operation ACCORDION from March to September 2020.
- Warrant Officer Class Two Joseph Howard Pedler – For meritorious achievement leading Indigenous Engagement within the Australian Army while serving at the 7th Battalion, the Royal Australian Regiment, in 2018 and 2019.
- Lieutenant Colonel Samuel James Waite – For meritorious devotion to duty as Commander Australian Contingent Operation MAZURKA and Chief of Operations of the Multinational Force and Observers, from 21 January 2020 to 8 February 2021.
- Squadron Leader Daniel James Bailey – For meritorious devotion to duty in P-8A operational mission system management for the Royal Australian Air Force.
- Wing Commander Callum Ross Carmichael – For meritorious achievement in cyber operations in Headquarters Joint Operations Command for the Australian Defence Force.
- Flight Sergeant Damian Andrew Gardiner – For meritorious achievement in F-35A Lightning II stealth fighter maintenance management at Number 3 Squadron for the Royal Australian Air Force.
- Wing Commander Samuel Ian Harkiss, CSC – For meritorious achievement in enhancing the Australian Defence Force's future maritime strike capability.
- Wing Commander Lynette Jayne Horne – For meritorious achievement in support of development and management of the Delamere Air Weapons Range.
- Squadron Leader Kathleen Maree Kennedy – For meritorious devotion to duty in development and implementation of the Royal Australian Air Force's professional development portal as the inaugural Content Manager.
- Wing Commander M – For meritorious devotion to duty during introduction of F-35 Lightning II air combat training operations at Number 2 Operational Conversion Unit for the Royal Australian Air Force.
- Squadron Leader Rebecca Lynette Olsen – For meritorious achievement as the Staff Officer Grade Two Satellite Operations at the Defence Network Operations Centre, Chief Information Officer Group.
- Sergeant Peter William Owens – For meritorious achievement in radio frequency countermeasures development and electronic warfare specialist support for Australian Defence Force airborne platforms.
- Wing Commander Howard Roby – For meritorious devotion to duty in aeromedical evacuation for the Royal Australian Air Force.
- Squadron Leader Breanna Sharp – For meritorious achievement in F-35A Lightning II Joint Strike Fighter logistics management and governance for the Royal Australian Air Force.
- Sergeant Jason Wayne Thomas – For meritorious devotion to duty in sustainment of Air Traffic Management systems at the Surveillance and Control Systems Program Office.
