= Swaffer =

Swaffer is a surname. Notable people with the surname include:

- Hannen Swaffer (1879–1962), English journalist and drama critic
- John Swaffer (1851–1936), English cricketer, uncle of Hannen Swaffer
- Kate Swaffer (born 1958), Australian advocate for dementia patients
- Kristyn Swaffer (born 1975), Australian association football player
- Patrick Swaffer (born 1951), British film industry executive
