= Bill Griggs =

Australian physician (born 1957)

Bill Griggs AM ASM
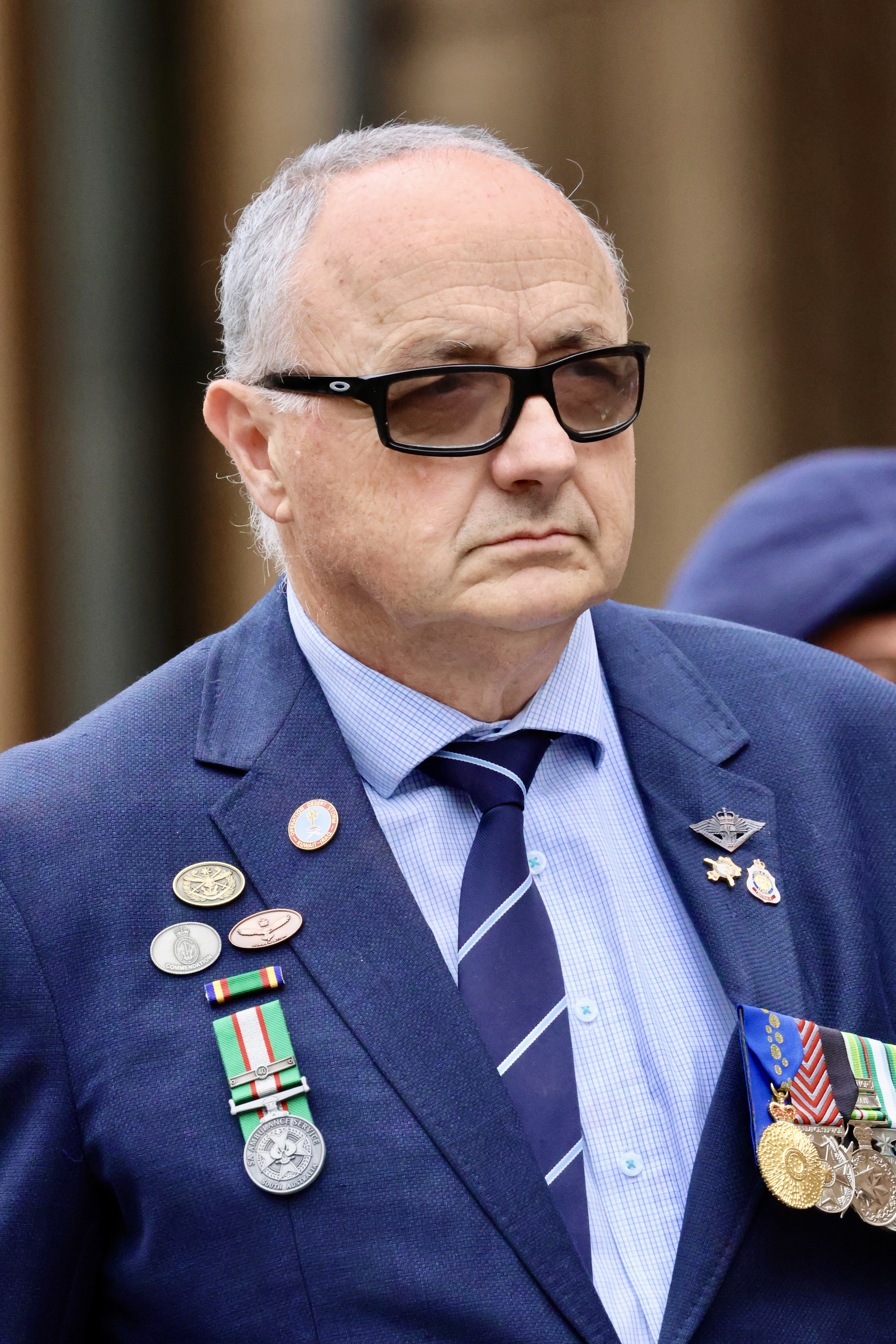
- Griggs in 2025
- Born: William Middleton Griggs; 19 June 1957 (age 69); Adelaide, South Australia, Australia
- Education: Prince Alfred College; University of Adelaide (MBBS; MBA); University of Otago
- Military service
- Allegiance: Australia
- Branch: Royal Australian Air Force
- Service years: 1988–2022
- Rank: Group captain
- Service number: O325130
- Units: USNS Comfort; USS Ranger (CV-61); HMAS Tobruk (L 50); RAAF Curtin
- Conflicts: Gulf War; Operation Damask; Bougainville conflict; Operation Lagoon; Operation Bel-Isi I; Operation Bel-Isi II; INTERFET; Operation Astute

William Middleton Griggs (born 19 June 1957) is an Australian physician who specialised in intensive care, anaesthesia and trauma medicine. He was the 2006 South Australian of the Year.

Born in Adelaide, Griggs went to Prince Alfred College. Later, he graduated from the University of Adelaide in 1981 and developed the "Griggs technique" percutaneous tracheostomy procedure in 1989. Griggs was a director of the Trauma Services of the Royal Adelaide Hospital from 1995 to 2018.

Griggs worked as a medical officer in the Royal Australian Air Force Reserve. The service of Griggs comprised participation in the Gulf War of 1991, deployment to Bougainville and East Timor, as well as medical relief during the Bali terrorist attacks of 2002 and the Indian Ocean Tsunami of 2004. In 2003, Griggs was awarded the Member of the Order of Australia for his contributions to medicine and the Australian Defence Force.

== Early life and education ==
William Middleton Griggs was born on 19 June 1957 in Adelaide. His father, Jim Griggs, was a mechanical engineer. Griggs has mentioned that his father and two of his uncles served as pilots during the Second World War and that he was named after an uncle who never came back.

Griggs studied at Prince Alfred College, where he was the captain of the chess club and a member of the XVIII Australian rules football team of the college. He pursued his medical studies at the University of Adelaide and was included in the dean's list. In 1976, while still pursuing his medical studies, he started working with St John Ambulance South Australia (SA). It was later revealed that he saw approximately 100 fatalities on the roads before graduating with his MBBS degree in 1981.

== Medical career ==
=== Clinical practice and research (1980s–1990) ===
Griggs began working with the SA Ambulance Service in the early 1980s, following several years as a volunteer ambulance officer. In 1986, he obtained his qualification in anaesthesia and in 1989 in intensive care. Griggs invented an instrument for percutaneous tracheotomy in 1989. He joined the Royal Australian Air Force Reserve in June 1988. In 1989, Griggs became a senior consultant in intensive care, retrieval services and anaesthesia with the ambulance service.

The guidewire dilator forceps and the method of performing a percutaneous tracheostomy were invented by Griggs and his father in 1989, which was later named the Griggs technique. The device went through trials and an ethically approved trial in the Royal Adelaide Hospital (RAH). The patent was acquired by the company of medical devices, Portex in the early 1990s. The technique was employed in treating Pope John Paul II in 2005.

=== Military service and disaster response (1990–2009) ===
Griggs worked as a consultant in intensive care at RAH from 1990. Griggs was on board the hospital ship USNS Comfort during the Gulf War of 1991 and was also on board the aircraft carrier USS Ranger (CV-61), where he assisted in training doctors. In 1992, he worked as a medical officer at RAAF Curtin. Two years later, Griggs was deployed to Bougainville as part of a team of five Fly Away Surgical Team as part of Operation Lagoon. The group started off working around Buka airstrip and later moved to HMAS Tobruk (L 50) at a harbour in Arawa. He also visited Bougainville again in 1998 twice as part of Truce Monitoring Group and Peace Monitoring Group and also provided medical services to civilians in Arawa.

Griggs became the first head of trauma services at RAH in 1995, a role which he maintained until he retired from his duties in the hospital in 2018. He also worked for INTERFET in Timor-Leste and gained a postgraduate diploma in aviation medicine from the University of Otago in 2000. He is one of the founders of the Australasian Trauma Society, where he was the president from 2001 to 2003.

After the Bali bombings in 2002, Griggs worked at the Royal Darwin Hospital and coordinated the transfer of wounded patients to burns units all around Australia. At the time, he was among the two intensive care unit specialists available in Darwin. In 2004 he created the Roads2Survival road safety program aimed at young people. After the Indian Ocean tsunami that occurred in December 2004, he served with the Australian Defence Force (ADF) medical triage team in Banda Aceh and participated in patient assessment, treatment, and aeromedical evacuation during Operation Sumatra Assist. He also helped in responding medically to the Bali bombings in 2005.

Griggs and paramedics search through rubble after the 2009 tsunami

Griggs started an Master of Business Administration program at the University of Adelaide in 2006 and graduated from it in 2009. From 2007 to 2017, he was a State Controller for Health and Medical Emergencies of South Australia. Griggs worked as a medical specialist officer in Dili, Timor-Leste, in 2007 in Operation Astute. In March, he was posted to Yogyakarta, Indonesia, where his expertise was needed following the disaster of Garuda Indonesia Flight 200. Griggs was also involved in the SIEV 36 case close to Ashmore Reef in April 2009, and the Samoan tsunami in September 2009.

=== Later appointments (2009–present) ===
In addition to his medical career, Griggs became a director of both Super SA in 2009 and ReturnToWorkSA in 2013. He was a member of Bedford Group's Remuneration Committee until 2015, the chairperson of Motor Accident Commission from 2015 to 2019 and a director of Funds SA in 2018. Upon retirement from his medical practice at the hospital in 2018, he continued his volunteer services with St John Ambulance SA and SA Ambulance Service.

On 25 March 2020, Griggs called for a lockdown to be enacted sooner rather than later due to the COVID-19 pandemic. Later, in August 2021, he was appointed Chair of Operations and Commissioner of St John Ambulance SA. In 2024, Griggs and Keith McNeil looked into assertions made about the prioritisation of patients in ambulances and emergency departments in South Australia. Their investigation did not find any proof that could back up the assertions. In 2026, he was still on the board of Funds SA.

== Personal life ==
Griggs enjoys family activities, computing, reading, playing chess, skiing, windsurfing, sailing, and fishing. Griggs is also a licensed private pilot.

Griggs' holiday residence located in Goolwa South in South Australia burned down on 10 May 2022. No one got injured since the house was empty. The fire was contained within the premises with the total damage estimated to be A$1 million.

== Honours and awards ==
Griggs received the Matthew Spence Medal for Best Registrar Paper in 1985. He obtained the Fellow of the Faculty of Anaesthetists of the Royal Australasian College of Surgeons (FFARACS) in anaesthesia in 1986 and intensive care in 1989, followed by the Fellow of the Australian and New Zealand College of Anaesthetists (FANZCA) in 1992, Fellow of the Faculty of Intensive Care, Australian and New Zealand College of Anaesthetists (FFICANZCA) in 1993 and Fellow of the Joint Faculty of Intensive Care Medicine (FJFICM) in 2002.

Griggs was appointed a Member of the Order of Australia (AM) in the 2003 Queen's Birthday Honours for his contributions to trauma, emergency and critical care, medical retrieval and transport, and the ADF. In 2006, he received the Keys to the City of Adelaide and was the Australian of the Year Award for South Australia. In the 2009 Queen's Birthday Honours, Griggs was conferred the Ambulance Service Medal (ASM). Later that year, in November, he was named as SA Great's South Australian of the Year by Governor Kevin Scarce. Griggs had been featured as a "Courageous Australian" on the cover of the 2010–11 Adelaide White Pages for his actions involving police officer Derrick McManus, who got shot during a siege in 1994. In 2014, the University of Adelaide presented Griggs with an honorary Doctor of the University, and he was designated as Emeritus Professor in May 2024.

His military honours include the Royal Australian Navy Commendation for his work in the Gulf War, the United States Navy Unit Citation, and the Chief of Defence Force Commendation for Operation Sumatra Assist. His other honours include being a member of the Order of Saint John, honorary fellow of the Australasian College of Paramedicine, and a Distinguished Alumnus of the University of Adelaide.

== Selected publications ==
As of 2009, Griggs has made over 60 publications.

- Griggs, W. M.; Worthley, L. I.; Gilligan, J. E.; Thomas, P. D.; Myburg, J. A. (June 1990). "A simple percutaneous tracheostomy technique". Surgery, Gynecology & Obstetrics. 170 (6): 543–545. PMID 2343371.
- Griggs, W. M.; Myburgh, J. A.; Worthley, L. I. (1991). "A prospective comparison of a percutaneous tracheostomy technique with standard surgical tracheostomy". Intensive Care Medicine. 17 (5): 261–263. doi:10.1007/BF01713934. PMID 1939869.
- Griggs, William (1996). "Defibrillation" (PDF). In Pearn, John (ed.). The Science of First Aid: The Theoretical and Experimental Basis of Modern First Aid Practice. St John Ambulance Australia. pp. 89–98. ISBN 0949569348.
- Brennan, P. W.; Everest, E. R.; Griggs, W. M.; Slater, A.; Carter, L.; Lee, C.; Semmens, J. K.; Wood, D. J.; Nguyen, A. M.; Owen, D. L.; Pilkington, P.; Roder, D. M.; Somers, R. L. (August 2002). "Risk of death among cases attending South Australian major trauma services after severe trauma: the first 4 years of operation of a state trauma system". The Journal of Trauma. 53 (2): 333–339. doi:10.1097/00005373-200208000-00024. PMID 12169943.
- Paix, Bruce R.; Griggs, William M. (February 2012). "Emergency surgical cricothyroidotomy: 24 successful cases leading to a simple 'scalpel-finger-tube' method". Emergency Medicine Australasia. 24 (1): 23–30. doi:10.1111/j.1742-6723.2011.01510.x. PMID 22313556.
