= List of South Australian of the Year Award recipients =

The Australian of the Year Award is given annually on Australia Day. The national award is a major public event, televised nationwide. The Award also operates at the State level. This page lists winners of the South Australia state award, who are automatically finalists in the national competition.

== Recipients ==
Year	Name	Image	Description	Award rationale
2004	Mem Fox		Children's author and literacy educator	For her contribution to children's literature and the promotion of childhood literacy.
2005	Michael Bossley		Marine conservationist	For his work protecting marine mammals, researching Adelaide's dolphins and promoting environmental conservation.
2006	Bill Griggs		Trauma specialist and anaesthetist	For his contribution to trauma medicine, aeromedical retrieval and the training of medical professionals.
2007	Terence Tao		Mathematician	For his achievements in mathematics, including becoming the first Australian recipient of the Fields Medal.
2008	Scott Hicks		Film director	For his achievements in filmmaking and his contribution to South Australia's film industry.
2009	Ivan Copley		Indigenous community worker	For his work advancing reconciliation and supporting Aboriginal communities through community development initiatives.
2010	Julian Burton		Burns charity founder	For establishing the Julian Burton Burns Trust and supporting burns prevention, treatment and research.
2011	Tanya Monro		Physicist	For her research in photonics and the development of optical fibres with applications in science, medicine and industry.
2012	Robyn Layton		Former judge and social justice advocate	For her advocacy for disadvantaged communities, including work on Aboriginal rights, child protection and the rights of women and migrants.
2013	Sonya Ryan		Online safety campaigner	For establishing the Carly Ryan Foundation and educating children and families about online safety.
2014	Felicity-ann Lewis		Community leader and health educator	For her community leadership and work supporting reconciliation, public health, refugees and migrants.
2015	Gill Hicks		Peace campaigner	For her work promoting peace and opposing violent extremism after surviving the 2005 London bombings.
2016	John Greenwood		Burns surgeon	For his contribution to burns treatment, disaster response and research into skin substitutes.
2017	Kate Swaffer		Author and dementia advocate	For her advocacy for the rights of people living with dementia and her work establishing Dementia Alliance International.
2018	David David		Craniofacial surgeon	For pioneering craniofacial surgery and providing treatment for people with facial deformities.
2019	Richard Harris		Anaesthetist and cave diver	For his role in rescuing twelve boys and their football coach during the 2018 Tham Luang cave rescue.
2020	James Muecke		Ophthalmologist and blindness prevention advocate	For his work preventing blindness and delivering eye health services through Sight For All.
2021	Tanya Hosch		Indigenous leader and sporting executive	For her leadership advancing Indigenous inclusion, gender equality and diversity in Australian rules football.
2022	Helen Marshall		Vaccine researcher	For her research into vaccination and her contribution to preventing meningococcal disease.
2023	Taryn Brumfitt		Body image advocate, author and filmmaker	For promoting body acceptance through the Body Image Movement, documentaries and educational resources.
2024	Tim Jarvis		Environmental scientist and explorer	For his environmental advocacy and conservation projects addressing climate change and biodiversity loss.
2025	Leah Bromfield		Child protection researcher	For her research into child abuse and neglect and her contribution to improving child protection systems.
2026	Katherine Bennell-Pegg		Astronaut and space engineer	For becoming the first astronaut qualified under Australia's space program and inspiring participation in science and space exploration.
2027	Fariba Behnia-Willison		Gynaecologist and reconstructive surgeon	For her contributions to women's health, including pelvic floor reconstruction and providing free restorative surgery to survivors of female genital mutilation.
