= Elsdon =

Elsdon may be a given name, a surname, or a place name.

The surname derives originally from a place name (in Northumberland, England) with the meaning in Old English of Elli's valley.

== Given name ==
- Thomas Elsdon Ashford, British recipient of the Victoria Cross
- Elsdon Best, New Zealand ethnographer
- Janet Elsdon Mackey, New Zealand politician
- Elsdon Storey, Australian neurologist

== Surname ==
- Alan Elsdon (1934–2016), British jazz musician
- William Elsdon (c. 1829 – 1904), Australian railway engineer

== Place name ==
- In New Zealand:
  - Elsdon, New Zealand a suburb of Porirua
- In the United Kingdom:
  - Elsdon, Herefordshire
  - Elsdon, Northumberland
- In the United States:
  - West Elsdon, Chicago

== Other uses of Elsdon ==
- The Elsdon murder, an instructive tale in Baden-Powell's Scouting for Boys
- The Elsdon Reel, a Northumberland traditional dance
