= Injury (journal) =

- Discipline: Traumatology
- Language: English
- Edited by: Peter V. Giannoudis

Publication details
- History: 1969-present
- Publisher: Elsevier
- Frequency: 10/year
- Impact factor: 2.137 (2014)

Standard abbreviations
- ISO 4: Injury

Indexing
- CODEN: INJUBF
- ISSN: 0020-1383 (print); 1879-0267 (web)
- OCLC no.: 1715915

Links
- Journal homepage; Online access; Online archive

Injury is a peer-reviewed medical journal covering trauma care. It was established in 1969 and is published 10 times per year by Elsevier. It is the official journal of the British Trauma Society, the Australasian Trauma Society, the Saudi Orthopaedic Association in Trauma, and affiliated with the Hellenic Association of Orthopaedic Surgery and Traumatology, the Societa' Italiana Di Ortopedia e Traumatologia, the Gerhard Kuentscher Society, the Spanish Society of Orthopaedic Surgery and Traumatology (SECOT), the Turkish Orthopaedic Trauma Society, AOTrauma, the Group d'Etude en Traumatologie Ostéoarticulaire, the Croatian Trauma Society, the Brazilian Association of Orthopedic Trauma, the Club Italiano Dell'Osteosintesi (CIO) and the European Society of Tissue Regeneration in Orthopaedics and Trauma (ESTROT). The editor-in-chief is Peter V. Giannoudis (University of Leeds). According to the Journal Citation Reports, the journal has a 2014 impact factor of 2.137.
