= Helen Marshall (vaccinologist) =

South Australian vaccine researcher

Helen Marshall AM FAHMS
- Born: Helen Siobhan Marshall
- Education: University of Adelaide
- Occupation: Medical researcher
- Spouse: David Misan

Helen Siobhan Marshall is an Australian medical researcher who is Professor of Vaccinology at the University of Adelaide. She was named the South Australian of the Year for 2022.

== Early life and education ==
Helen Siobhan Marshall grew up in Adelaide, South Australia Her mother was a nurse and her father a general practitioner. She completed her schooling at Pembroke School, Adelaide in 1979.

Marshall graduated from the University of Adelaide with an MBBS in 1988. She returned to the university for postgraduate studies, receiving a Masters in Public Health in 2004 and a Doctorate of Medicine in 2011. She has also completed an international Advanced Vaccinology Course at the Pasteur Institute in France.

== Career ==
As a medical student, Marshall worked for a time in Western Samoa, which she has said has "guided her interest" in vaccinology. She then undertook paediatric training at the Women's and Children's Hospital in Adelaide, where she saw the impact of serious infections from diseases without vaccines available.

Marshall focused on research in vaccinology, public health and infectious diseases. She is Professor of Vaccinology in the Adelaide Medical School and Deputy Director, Clinical and Translational Research for the Robinson Research Institute at the University of Adelaide. She is also a Senior Medical Practitioner and Medial Director for Vaccinology and Immunology Research Trials Unit at the Women's and Children's Hospital.

Marshall was awarded NHMRC Career Development Fellowships in 2011 and 2015, and a Practitioner Fellowship in 2019. She has published over 211 peer-reviewed papers and been awarded 17 research grants totalling more than $33 million. She has been a member of Australian Technical Advisory Group on Immunisation and continues to provide vaccination evaluations for the group, and she is an advisor to the World Health Organization.

Marshall's research focus throughout her career has been on development of vaccines for meningococcal disease. She conducted a three-year large scale study of over 42,000 people across South Australia, the largest study of its kind and one that has been called a "game-changer", which will inform global research and understanding about the disease.

During the COVID-19 pandemic, Marshall provided advice to the state's Health Minister Stephen Wade and Chief Public Health Officer Nicola Spurrier and was cited as one of Australia's leading vaccination experts. Commencing in September 2020, Marshall was co-investigator at the University of Sydney in a Phase I Human Trial of a novel DNA-based COVID-19 vaccine developed by BioNet and Technovalia that could be administered without using a needle. She is also part of a University of Queensland research team seeking to improve primary health care services for Aboriginal and Torres Strait Islander peoples and is leading a study to provide free meningococcal B vaccinations to Northern Territory residents as she studies whether the vaccine can also provide protection against gonorrhoea.

In October 2021, Marshall was named South Australian of the Year for her work in public health and infectious diseases, making her the state's nominee for Australian of the Year. She was made a Member of the Order of Australia in the 2022 Australia Day Honours.

== Awards and honours ==
- 2010 South Australia Science Award, Excellence in Research for the Public Good
- 2019 SA Science Awards Excellence in Research Collaboration
- 2020 Australia Day Council South Australian Inspiring Women award
- 2021 Fellow of the Australian Academy of Health and Medical Sciences
- 2022 South Australian of the Year
- 2022 Member of the Order of Australia

== Personal life ==
During her paediatric training, Marshall married fellow doctor David Misan. They have three children.

== Selected publications ==
- Marshall, Helen; Ryan, Philip; Roberton, Don; Baghurst, Peter (2007). "A cross-sectional survey to assess community attitudes to introduction of Human Papillomavirus vaccine". Australian and New Zealand Journal of Public Health. 31 (3): 235–242. doi:10.1111/j.1467-842X.2007.00054.x. PMID 17679241. S2CID 32275697.
- Sollis, MT; Marshall, H. (2008). "Confirmation of the association between high levels of immunoglobulin E food sensitization and eczema in infancy: An international study". Clinical and Experimental Allergy. 38 (1): 161–168. doi:10.1111/j.1365-2222.2007.02861.x. PMID 18028467. S2CID 28667158.
- Nolan, Terry; McVernon, Jodie; Skeljo, Maryanne; Richmond, Peter; Wadia, Ushma; Lambert, Stephen; Nissen, Michael; Marshall, Helen (2010). "Immunogenicity of a monovalent 2009 influenza A (H1N1) vaccine in infants and children: a randomized trial". JAMA. 303 (1): 37–46. doi:10.1001/jama.2009.1911. PMID 20026597. S2CID 34457160.
- Kessels, Sharon J.M.; Marshall, Helen S.; Watson, Maureen; Braunack-Mayer, Annette J.; Reuzel, Rob; Tooher, Rebecca L. (2012). "Factors associated with HPV vaccine uptake in teenage girls: A systematic review". Vaccine. 30 (24): 3546–3556. doi:10.1016/j.vaccine.2012.03.063. PMID 22480928.
- Richmond, Peter C; Marshall, Helen S (2012). "Safety, immunogenicity, and tolerability of meningococcal serogroup B bivalent recombinant lipoprotein 2086 vaccine in healthy adolescents". The Lancet Infectious Diseases. 12 (8): 597–607. doi:10.1016/S1473-3099(12)70087-7. hdl:20.500.12466/3827. PMID 22569484.
- Davies, Cristyn; Skinner, Susan Rachel; Stoney, Tanya; Marshall, Helen Siobhan; Collins, Joanne (2017). "'Is it like one of those infectious kind of things?' The importance of educating young people about HPV and HPV vaccination at school". Sex Education. 17 (3): 256–275. doi:10.1080/14681811.2017.1300770. S2CID 79500303.
- Marshall, HS; Koehler, AP (2020). "Safety of meningococcal B vaccine (4CMenB) in adolescents in Australia". Vaccine. 38 (37): 5914–5922. doi:10.1016/j.vaccine.2020.07.009. PMID 32712083. S2CID 220796693.
- Marshall, Helen S; McMillan, Mark; Koehler, Ann P (2020). "Meningococcal B vaccine and meningococcal carriage in adolescents in Australia". New England Journal of Medicine. 382 (4): 318–327. doi:10.1056/NEJMoa1900236. hdl:1983/c4568748-cb53-4898-9fbe-8bee118cbd27. PMID 31971677. S2CID 210865563.
- Marshall, Helen S (2021). "Meningococcal surveillance in Southeast Asia and the Pacific". Microbiology Australia. 42 (4): 178–181. doi:10.1071/MA21050. S2CID 243490091.
- Wang, Bing; Nolan, Rebecca; Marshall, Helen (2021). "COVID-19 Immunisation, Willingness to Be Vaccinated and Vaccination Strategies to Improve Vaccine Uptake in Australia". Vaccines. 9 (12): 1467. doi:10.3390/vaccines9121467. PMC 8704895. PMID 34960213.
