= Ary Hoffmann =

Australian scientist

Ary Hoffmann AC FAA
- Born: Ary Anthony Hoffmann; The Hague, The Netherlands
- Education: University of Queensland; Monash University; La Trobe University
- Awards: Companion of the Order of Australia (2022)
- Scientific career
- Workplaces: University of Melbourne

Ary Anthony Hoffmann AC is an Australian entomologist and geneticist who studied at Monash University and La Trobe University. He is the chair of ecological genetics and Melbourne Laureate Professor at the University of Melbourne. and leads the Pest & Environmental Adaptation Research Group at the University of Melbourne Bio21 Institute.

On Australia Day 2022, Hoffmann was appointed Companion of the Order of Australia "for eminent service to science, particularly evolutionary biology and ecological genetics, through research, mentoring and education, and to professional scientific organisations". Hoffmann is also a Fellow of the Australian Academy of Science (elected in 2004), Foreign Fellow of the American Academy of Arts and Science (elected in 2016), and an International Member of the National Academy of Science (elected in 2026).

== Education ==
Hoffmann studied at the University of Queensland and Monash University and obtained a Bachelor of Science (Honours) in 1980. He completed his PhD at La Trobe University in 1984.

== Research ==
Hoffmann's work in evolutionary biology is focused on applying its principles to solve modern problems. Areas of Hoffmann's research has included climate change adaptation and endosymbionts. Hoffmann's work is highly cited and prolific. He currently focuses on research to continue developing endosymbiont technology for pest and disease vector control and also maintains an interest in climate change adaptation and invertebrate conservation.
