= Judith Hugo =

- Occupation: Convenor of Friends of Australian Rock Art
- Known for: Indigenous Rock Art

Judith Hugo was awarded an Order of Australia in 2022 for her services to art in Australia. She was also instrumental in bringing a court case against Woodside's expansion of fossil fuel pollution and mining, due to the impact of fossil fuels on rock art. She has been awarded multiple prizes for the protection of rock art.

== Career ==
Hugo was a staff member at the North Western TAFE, with a 25-year career that spanned responsibilities across the art collection, in addition to being art curator, and organising exhibitions as well as artist in residence programs, across her career.

Hugo also conducted volunteer work, in the visual arts community, over various organisations, including the Friends of Australian Rock Art. Hugo was also a Volunteer Gallery Guide for the Art Gallery of Western Australia.

Additionally, Hugo was a co-convenor of the group "Friends of Australian Rock Art", which was founded in 2006. Friends of Australian Rock Art was created and founded with the goal of protecting the ancient rock art of the Murujuga region. She was also a Curator of the Central TAFE Perth Art Collection, from the years 1991 to 2020.

Hugo was a co-signatory of the letter from the Australia Institute, from artists around the world. The purpose of this letter to advocate on the decision to be made by the Federal Government, in 2025, on

"whether to protect one of Australia and the world's most important artworks, or allow its ongoing destruction for decades from additional acid gas pollution from the North West Shelf gas export terminal."

The acid emissions from the Woodside fossil fuel pollution have been destroying the Western Australia artwork, and Hugo and others argued that the North West Gas Shelf expansion should be prevented.

== Conservation work ==
Hugo was awarded the Bessie Rischbieth Conservation award, which is the highest conservation award for the CCWA, jointly with Dr Marie Ferland, as a recognition of her outstanding commitment. The award was for her 'courage to challenge non government and government decision makers'. Hugo was a Friends of Australian Rock Art co-convenor for 14 years, and regularly challenged both state and federal government ministers, as well as CEOs, business people and bureaucrats working on projects that are polluting the Burrup Peninsula, with the aim to reduce the impact of pollution on the ancient petroglyphs.

Woodside and the proposed North Shelf extension will have severe consequences on the rock art, in the cases brought by Hugo and others, as well as releasing a significant amount of CO2 emissions. The Woodside Scarborough project was modelled to be releasing an amount of deaths which would cause 484 heat-related deaths, in Europe, expose an additional 516,000 people around the world to previously not-experienced heat.

The rock art Hugo is defending in the Woodside court case is also the world's largest collection of Indigenous art, and has been nominated to be listed in UNESCO World Heritage listing.

Hugo was cited in the National Indigenous Times, describing her response to the WA government's release of the Murujuga Rock Art Monitoring report, which confirmed the impact and damage to the art as a result of industrial emissions, and acidic rain. The report tracked air quality, chemistry of rock surfaces, as well as pH levels, and rainfall, and their impacts on the rock at in the area.

== Advocacy ==
Hugo has been involved in the legal case around Woodside fossil fuel pollution, advocating that the Western Australian government permission of the North West Shelf extension, to the year of 2070, fails to take into consideration the impact of the project's contribution to climate change on the public, and as such is a violation of the Environmental Protection Act.

She stated:

""We feel there is a lot of legal action happening now around climate change and we feel the time is right to actually finally challenge the oil and gas industry,"

== Awards ==
- 2022 - Australia Day honours - Order of Australia.
- 2021 - Bessie Rischbeith Conservation Award.
