= John Swaffer =

English cricketer

Personal information
- Born: 10 November 1851; Ruckinge, Kent
- Died: 26 July 1936 (aged 84); Orsett, Essex
- Batting: Right-handed
- Role: Batsman
- Relatives: Hannen Swaffer (nephew)

Domestic team information
- Years: Team
- 1873: Kent
- Only FC: 10 July 1873 Kent v Lancashire
- Source: CricInfo, 18 August 2023

John Swaffer (10 November 1851 – 26 July 1936) was an English cricketer who played in one first-class cricket match for Kent County Cricket Club in 1873.

Swaffer was born at Ruckinge in Kent in 1851, one of the eight children of John and Harriet Swaffer (née Maylam). His father was a farmer and at the 1861 census the family were farming a 500 acres (200 ha) farm at Kingsnorth near Ashford. John Swaffer senior died the following year and the farm was taken over by Swaffer's oldest brother. Swaffer himself became a draper's assistant at Tunbridge Wells and worked in the clothing industry for most of his life. He married Sarah Ann Kemp at Dover in 1876 and worked at Ashford and, by 1911, at Hastings. The couple had six children, three sons and three children.

Described by Scores and Biographies as a "good batsman" and by the 1907 History of Kent County Cricket as a "useful batsman", Swaffer only played in one first-class match, a July 1873 fixture against Lancashire at Gravesend. A right-handed batsman, he scored 18 runs in his first innings and recorded a duck opening the batting in his second.

Swaffer died at Orsett in Essex in 1936. He was aged 84. His nephew was the journalist and critic Hannen Swaffer.

== Bibliography ==
- Carlaw, Derek (2020). Kent County Cricketers, A to Z: Part One (1806–1914) (PDF). Cardiff: ACS.
