= Leslie Burnett =

Leslie Burnett (born Sydney, New South Wales, Australia) is an Australian medical pathologist, specialising in genetic pathology and chemical pathology. He has worked in public pathology and pathology professional practice, contributing to the introduction of quality management into Australian pathology and achieving recognition by the Australian Government of public pathology as a healthcare stakeholder. He has also worked in genetic and genomic pathology, establishing the diagnostic molecular biology unit at Royal Prince Alfred Hospital, introducing Australia’s first community-based genetic carrier screening program (the “Tay-Sachs disease program”, now known as the “Community Genetics Program (NSW)”), directing Australia’s first clinically accredited whole genome sequencing service (at Genome.One), and developing the “Goldilocks” method for optimising reproductive genetic carrier screening tests.

He has authored more than 150 publications, including over 100 peer-reviewed journal articles, books and textbook chapters.

In 2022, he was appointed a Member of the Order of Australia for his “significant service to pathology, to medical research, and to professional societies”.

== Career ==
Leslie Burnett graduated from the University of Sydney with a Bachelor of Medicine and Bachelor of Surgery in 1980. Following his graduation he joined the pathology service at Royal Prince Alfred Hospital (RPA), working alongside Professors W.J. Hensley, R. Benn, and Yvonne E. Cossart, gaining his Membership of the Australasian Association of Clinical Biochemists, his Fellowship of the Royal College of Pathologists of Australasia and completing his PhD in 1986.

While working within the NSW Pathology Systems as Director of Clinical Chemistry at the Institute of Clinical Pathology and Medical Research from 1990-1997, he helped develop and introduce statistical process control and quality management systems into pathology in Australia. During this time, he also established Australia’s first genetic carrier screening program, the Tay-Sachs disease program (now known as the Community Genetics program (NSW)). In 1997, he joined Pacific Laboratory Medicine Services (PaLMS) (now part of NSW Health Pathology), the pathology service of Royal North Shore Hospital, as its inaugural Director of Pathology. He was involved in the networking and later amalgamation of pathology services across NSW, forming and directing Pathology North (now part of NSW Health Pathology). He was founding President of the National Coalition of Public Pathology (now Public Pathology Australia) from 2001 to 2006, with NCOPP becoming a signatory, representing public pathology, to the Commonwealth Pathology Quality and Outlays Memorandum of Understanding 2004-2009. He was President of the Australasian Association for Clinical Biochemistry and Laboratory Medicine from 2007 to 2011 and Chairman of the National Pathology Accreditation Advisory Council (NPAAC) of the Commonwealth Department of Health and Ageing. In 2022, he was appointed a Member of the Order of Australia for his “significant service to pathology, to medical research, and to professional societies”.

In 2015, he was seconded from the NSW Health system to the Garvan Institute of Medical Research to establish Australia’s first clinically accredited whole genome sequencing service. In 2016, he became the inaugural Chief Medical Officer of Genome.One, a commercial offshoot of the Garvan Institute of Medical Research.

From 2022 to 2023 he was the Medical Laboratory Director (Australia) of Invitae Corporation. In 2024, he joined Virtus Diagnostics (part of Virtus Health) as Consultant Pathologist, becoming its Medical Laboratory Director of Genetics and later also of Chemical Pathology.

During the period 2023-2026, he and colleagues developed a new approach to designing reproductive genetic carrier screening test panels, named the “Goldilocks” approach. The Goldilocks approach maximises yield through gene selection across ancestries, rather than using fixed carrier frequency thresholds. He published literature suggesting the Goldilocks approach yields higher carrier yields than conventional carrier screening tests in a study by the developers. Goldilocks carrier screening tests became available to the public as a clinically accredited test in 2026.

== Awards and honours ==
Burnett has received various professional awards and honours. These include the Management Science Award of the American Association for Clinical Chemistry (2004) and the Meritorious Service Award of the Royal College of Pathologists of Australasia (2012). He was the W. Roman Travelling Lecturer, Australasian Association for Clinical Biochemistry and Laboratory Medicine in 2019 and delivered the HGSA Oration, Human Genetics Society of Australasia in 2025. He was elected a Fellow of the Royal Society of NSW in 2016, and appointed a Member of the Order of Australia (AM) in 2022, for “significant service to pathology, to medical research, and to professional societies”.
