= White Pages Australia =

Contact information directory

White Pages Australia is a formerly government-owned and now-privatised directory of contact information for people and business entities within Australia. Originally only in the form of a print book delivered to all households for several decades, it now also exists online as a search for businesses only. Searching for residential phone numbers and addresses using the online platform was discontinued 1/11/2025

Originally named the Melbourne Telephone Exchange Company, White Pages Australia was founded in 1880 as Australia's first telephone exchange. It later became known as the Victorian Telephone Exchange Company and remained a private company until 1887, when it was purchased by the Victorian Colonial Government.

White Pages Australia is part of the Sensis brand, owned in part by Telstra and in part by Platinum Equity. As a part of Telstra's carrier licence conditions, the White Pages is required to produce an annual alphabetical public number directory. This public number directory is then made available free of charge to all of Telstra's customers and the customers of other carriage service providers.

In recent decades, Sensis has received extensive public critique regarding the environmental impact of producing hard copy directories. It has been estimated that over 5 million trees are cut down each year in order to publish the hard copies of White Pages, however, as of 2016 only 2 to 3 percent of households in Australia had opted out of receiving hard copies.

== History of the White Pages ==
1880 The private Melbourne Telephone Exchange Company opened Australia's first telephone exchange in August 1880.

Federation and 1901 Each of the six Australian colonies had their own telephony communications network prior to the Federation of Australia in 1901. As part of Federation the Post Master General (later to become Australia Post) took ownership of the telephone network nationally.

=== 1920s ===
By the 1920s the telephone had become a crucial form of communication in Australia. At this time the Post Master General's Office started selling advertising in the exchange directory and directory based advertising was born in Australia.

=== 1970s ===
The Post Master General's Office regulated telecommunications and operated all the telephone and related communications within Australia from Federation up to 22 December 1975. In mid 1975 the department split into two Government business enterprises: The Australian Telecommunications Commission (trading as Telecom Australia) and the Australian Postal Commission (trading as Australia Post). 1975 also saw the birth of the National Directory Service (NDS).

Telecom published the first version of a category based director in Australia called the Pink Pages (now known as Yellow Pages).

=== 1980s ===
In 1980 the White Pages was separated from the Yellow Pages in Brisbane. This continued across Australia in the 1980s until the White Pages was completely separate from the Yellow Pages. The White Pages directory became so large that it was necessary to print multiple editions, splitting the alphabet in half.

=== 1990s ===
In 1994 the world's first White Pages online site was published on the World Wide Web including daily updates to the business, government and residential directory. Just a year later the White Pages directory was also offered on CD-Rom.

=== 2000s ===
In the new millennium the White Pages introduced online only listings, a 'business finder' feature and the ability to clone your White Pages listing content on to the Yellow Pages online website. An 'opt in' distribution model was introduced for the residential version of the White Pages in metro Melbourne and Sydney, allowing users to decide whether they wanted to receive the residential White Pages book to their home or not. The White Pages also trialled a CD 'book view' version of the directory in the 2000s, but it did not prove to be very popular.

=== 2010 to now ===
A compact version of the White Pages was trialed in September 2010 in Sydney that was 85% of the standard directory size. This would be trialed in many areas but would eventually be rolled back. In 2011 the White Pages partnered with Vision Australia to release a White Pages Accessibility Guide to help provide a business, government and residential telephone directory to the vision impaired of Australia. In March 2014, Telstra sold 70% of the Sensis business to American private equity firm Platinum Equity for $454 million. As a part of the deal Sensis would continue producing and distributing the White Pages directory as required under Telstra's carrier licence. The sale saw Sensis depart Telstra management and begin to operate as a separate entity.
