= Robyn Smith (sports administrator) =

Australian sports administrator

Robyn Smith OAM (born 15 July 1960 in Melbourne) is an Australian sport administrator particularly in the area for disability sport. In 2021, she was elected as an Independent Member on the Governing Board of the International Paralympic Committee.

== Personal ==
Smith was born 15 July 1960 in Melbourne. She lives in Benalla, Victoria.

== Sport administration career ==
Smith's community involvement in sport includes as President of Benalla Little Athletics and coach of the Benalla Saints Netball team. In 1990, Smith became the Chief Executive Office of AUSRAPID (now Sport Inclusion Australia) and holds this position as of 2022. At the 2000 Sydney Paralympics, Smith was Assistant Chef de Mission for the Australian Team. After the 2000 Sydney Paralympic Games, athletes with an intellectual disability were suspended from the Paralympic Games following the cheating by the Spanish Paralympic Basketball Team at the Games. Smith with Marie Little led the fight for the re-inclusion of athletes with an intellectual disability into the Paralympic Games. In December 2020, Smith was appointed Chair of Australian Sporting Alliance for People with a Disability which is a collaboration of nine national disability sports organisations.

Smith was the Oceania representative International Sports Federation for Persons with Intellectual Disability (now known as Virtus) from 2011 to 2013. In 2013, she was the first female elected as vice president of Virtus. She was re-elected vice president in 2017. Smith was the chief executive officer of the Global Games Sports Company with organised INAS Global Games in Brisbane in 2019.

In December 2021, she was elected vice-president of the International Paralympic Committee. Smith's campaign for vice-president used the slogan "#EveryoneIncluded – a call to action that more needs to be done for people with disabilities, and those who are underrepresented or come from marginalised regions, to be included in sports."

Smith is a member of Brisbane 2032 Organising Committee for the Olympic and Paralympic Games (BNEOCOG) Board due to being the Australian member of the International Paralympic Committee Governing Board. In commenting on her appointment, Smith said "“My goal over the next decade is for every young child who is born or acquires a disability sees sport as an avenue to be included."

In 2025, Smith was elected as President of Virtus. In December 2025, it was announced that Smith was departing as Sport Inclusion Australia CEO, after 35 years. At the time, she was the longest serving CEO of an Australian national sports organisation.

== Recognition ==
Smith is a life member of the Goulburn Valley Netball Association and Goulburn Valley Sports Association. In 2000, she was awarded the Australian Sports Medal for outstanding contribution to the development of sport for the intellectually disabled. In 2011, Smith was Benalla Rural City Citizen of the Year. In 2019, awarded Service to Sport Award, Australian Institute of Sport. In 2022, Smith was OAM for service to people with disability through sport.
