= Elsdon Storey =

Australian neurologist

Elsdon Storey AM is an Australian neurologist, former Rhodes Scholar and Professor of Neurology at Monash University. His clinical and research interests are in neurogenetics (especially the hereditary ataxias) and behavioural neurology (especially the dementias).

After clinical neurology training in Oxford and Melbourne, and research training at Oxford, Massachusetts General Hospital and with Colin Masters at Melbourne University, Storey was appointed as the first Van Cleef Roet Professor of Neuroscience at Monash in 1996. He is also Head of the Alfred Neurology Unit. He is on the Council of the Australian and New Zealand Association of Neurologists as Neurology Co-Editor of their official Journal (the Journal of Clinical Neuroscience), and the Boards of the Brain Foundation, Neurosciences Victoria, and the Bethlehem-Griffiths Foundation.

In the 2022 Australia Day Honours, he was appointed a Member of the Order of Australia for "significant service to medicine in the field of neurology, and to professional associations".
