= Kate Swaffer =

Australian civil rights campaigner (born 1958)

- Born: 1958 (age 67–68)
- Education: Master of Science
- Alma mater: University of Wollongong
- Occupations: Author, Speaker, Academic, Campaigner for Disability rights
- Years active: 12
- Known for: Dementia, Human Rights and Disability Campaigner
- Awards: UoW Alumni Award for Social Impact (2016); SA Australian Of The Year (2017)

Kate Swaffer (born 1958) is an Australian civil rights campaigner, and activist for the rights of people with dementia and older persons globally, and for dementia to be managed as a disability. This is to enable equal access to the Convention on the Rights of Persons with Disabilities (CRPD), of people with dementia who are people with acquired disabilities. She was awarded Australian of the Year for South Australia in 2017, and was announced the 2018 Global Leader of the 100 Women of Influence in Australia.

== Early life ==
Swaffer was born in a farming community on Eyre Peninsula in 1958. She is married, and has two adult sons. Her first career was nursing, having worked in dementia and aged care and then operating theatres; she is also a retired chef having run her own hospitality businesses for ten years. She subsequently worked in health care sales.

Swaffer was diagnosed with a rare young onset dementia shortly before her 50th birthday. Subsequently, she completed a Bachelor of Arts in Professional Writing and Creative Communication (2009) and a Bachelor of Psychology (2010). She has also completed a Master of Science in Dementia Care (2014), and is currently enrolled at the University of South Australia to complete her PhD.

== Activism and advocacy ==
Swaffer is one of eight co founders of Dementia Alliance International, a global advocacy and support group for people living with dementia which was launched on 1 January 2014. She is the only Australian to have been a full member of the World Dementia Council and is a past elected board member of Alzheimer's Disease International, serving her second term from 2015 through to June 2022. Her PhD candidature which first commenced at the University of Wollongong and was then transferred to the University of South Australia focuses on dementia as a disability and human rights. Her publications are available on ORCID. She is an Honorary Associate Fellow with the Faculty of Science, Medicine and Health, University of Wollongong, a past Fellow of The Royal Society for Arts, Manufactures and Commerce (RSA), and an International Fellow at the University of East Anglia. Swaffer completed a Master of Science in Dementia Care with a Distionction at the University of Wollongong in 2014.

In her human rights work, Swaffer is the first person living with a diagnosis of dementia to give an invited keynote speech at an agency of the United Nations, the World Health Organization (WHO), speaking on day two of the WHO First Ministerial Conference on Dementia in March 2015, where she demanded human rights for all people with dementia, access to the Convention on the Rights of Persons with Disabilities (CRPD) for all people with dementia, and a balance in research between care and cure on the global stage. These demands were included in the WHO Final Call To Action, and human rights were included in the Global action plan on the public health response to dementia 2017–2025, adopted at the World Health Assembly in May 2017.

Swaffer is a campaigner for human rights in aged and dementia care, for dementia to be managed as a condition causing disabilities, and for social justice for all, and still volunteers for The Big Issue, and organisation supporting the homeless in South Australia, and The Bereaved Through Suicide Support Group (SA) Incorporated.

Swaffer is an academic, author and poet. Her two books on dementia were released in 2016. Swaffer's first two volumes of poetry were published in 2012 and 2016.

Swaffer's more recent independent research work with Associate Professor Linda Steele from the University of Technology Sydney, Australia, the Dementia Justice Project, focuses on reparations for past, current and future human rights violations of people living in large congregate style residential aged care facilities (also referred to as long-term care, nursing homes and aged care). The Final Report and 25 Dementia Reparations Principles is novel new research highlighting the urgent need for recognition of harms to people with dementia, accountability of perpetrators, and immediate action to prevent current and future harm. This research was led by people with dementia and care partners and family members of people living with dementia. The institutional nature of these venues is harmful in their very structure, and because people with dementia are people living with acquired disabilitieas, she campaigns for the implementation of the CRPD/C/5: Guidelines on deinstitutionalization, including in emergencies (2022).

Swaffer has been instrumental in bringing human rights and dementia as a disability, and for rehabilitation for all people with dementia to the fore in dementia and aged care, through published articles and books, presentations and global campaigning. Since 2010, she has given more than 1000 invited presentations in the fields of dementia and human rights, disAbility, discrimination, stigma, dementia-enabling design principles, language, Inclusive Communities, Prescribed Disengagement®, Models of care, Information Technology, Advocacy and Activism, dementia policy (local, national and global) and loss and grief.

== Education ==
- PhD Candidate, University of South Australia, School of Justice and Society (current)
- PhD Candidate, University of Wollongong (2016 FT, then LoA, 2017- July 18)
- Master of Science, Dementia, (Distinction), University of Wollongong, 2014
- Bachelor of Psychology, University of South Australia, 2010
- Bachelor of Arts, Writing and Creative Communication, University of South Australia, 2009
- Certificate of Small Business Management, Business SA, 2005
- Graduate Diploma in Grief Counselling, University of Ballarat, 1989
- Chef Diploma: “Australian Cuisine with Cheong Liew”, Regency Park TAFE, 1987
- Nurses training, Whyalla Hospital and Cleve District Hospital, SA, 1975-1977

== Awards and honours ==
- Alumni Award, University of South Australia 2021
- Ambassador, StepUp4DementiaResearch, Australia, 2019 - current
- Winner, Global Leader, AFR/Qantas 100 Women of Influence, 2018
- Winner, Australian of The Year, South Australia, 2017
- SA Parliamentary Motion (60) by the Hon Kelly Vincent MLC, 2017, unanimously accepted recognising her local, national and global work in dementia
- The Sir Keith Wilson Oration, Australian Gerontology Association (AAG) SA, 2017
- Listed in Who's Who in Australia, annually since 2016
- Winner, Alumni Award Social Impact Award, University of Wollongong, 2016
- Finalist, Social Impact, Westpac/AFR 100 Women of Influence, 2016
- Finalist, Australian of the Year, South Australia, 2016
- Winner, National Disability Awards: Emerging Leader in Disability Awareness in Australia, 2015
- Inaugural Winner, Dementia Leader, University of Stirling International Dementia Awards, 2015
- Inaugural winner, Dignity in Care Achievement Award, Outstanding Individual Contribution to Dignity in Care, 2015
- Winner, Bethanie Education Medallion Award, 2015
- Winner, University of Wollongong, AAG Community Engagement Award, 2015
- University of Wollongong, Alumni Award Social Impact Award, Runner up, 2015
- University of Wollongong, Master of Science (Dementia Care), Distinction, 2014
- Website Creating life with words: Love, Inspiration and Truth, archived in the PANDORA Collection of the State (SA) and National Library of Australia, 2012
- Dementia and the Arts, Also A Mirror, ECH Inc. and Urban Myth Theatre of Youth and Kate Swaffer, South Australia, 2012
- Patron for The Visitors, a play about Younger Onset Dementia, Urban Myth Theatre Group and ECH Residential Aged Care, 2012–13
- Bachelor of Psychology University Merit Award, University of South Australia, 2008
- Lifetime Golden Key Membership, University of South Australia, 2008

== Selected works ==
- Swaffer, Kate (2016). What The Hell Happened to My Brain?: Living Beyond Dementia. ISBN 9781784500733.
- Swaffer, Kate; Low, Lee-Fay (2016). Diagnosed with Alzheimer's or another dementia. ISBN 9781742576442.
- Swaffer, Kate (2012). Love, life, loss : a roller-coaster of poetry. ISBN 9780987274502.
- Swaffer, Kate (2016). Love, life, loss : a roller coaster of poetry. Volume 2, Days with dementia. ISBN 9781760411855.
