= Australasian Trauma Society =

Australia and New Zealand Trauma Society
- Abbreviation: ANZTS
- Formation: 1997
- Type: Non-profit
- Legal status: Active
- Purpose: Trauma Care
- Headquarters: Sydney, Australia
- Location: Australia
- Region served: Australia & New Zealand
- Official language: English
- President: Dinesh Varma
- Website: https://www.anzts.com.au/

The Australia and New Zealand Trauma Society (ANZTS) is a medical specialist interest group for medical and paramedical individuals working in the area of traumatic injury. It was begun in 1997 by a group of health professionals from Australia and New Zealand involved in trauma care. In 2022 the ATS was renamed the Australian and New Zealand Trauma Society (ANZTS).

== Aims ==
The stated aims of the ANZTS are:

- To foster and promote scientific research into all aspects of Trauma Care.
- To improve the standard and delivery of trauma Services to the Australasian community.
- To provide opportunities for all those involved in trauma Care in Australasia to further their scientific knowledge and exchange information in this field.
- To promote and develop the highest standards of patient care, education and organisation in the field of trauma in order to deliver higher standards of community care
- To promote communications and relations with international organisations involved in Trauma Care.

== Membership ==
Membership of the Society is open to doctors, nurses and paramedical personnel from both Australia and New Zealand. Associate membership is open to others outside of those categories.

== Activities ==
The ANZTS runs an annual scientific meeting either alone or in combination with other organisations such as the Trauma Association of Canada. It also provides financial and other support for the Australasian National Trauma Registry consortium.

An annual travelling fellowship is offered to a member to allow them to further their trauma care knowledge.

The medical journal Injury is the journal for both the ATS and the British Trauma Society.
