= Karen Livesey =

Australian physicist

Karen L. Livesey
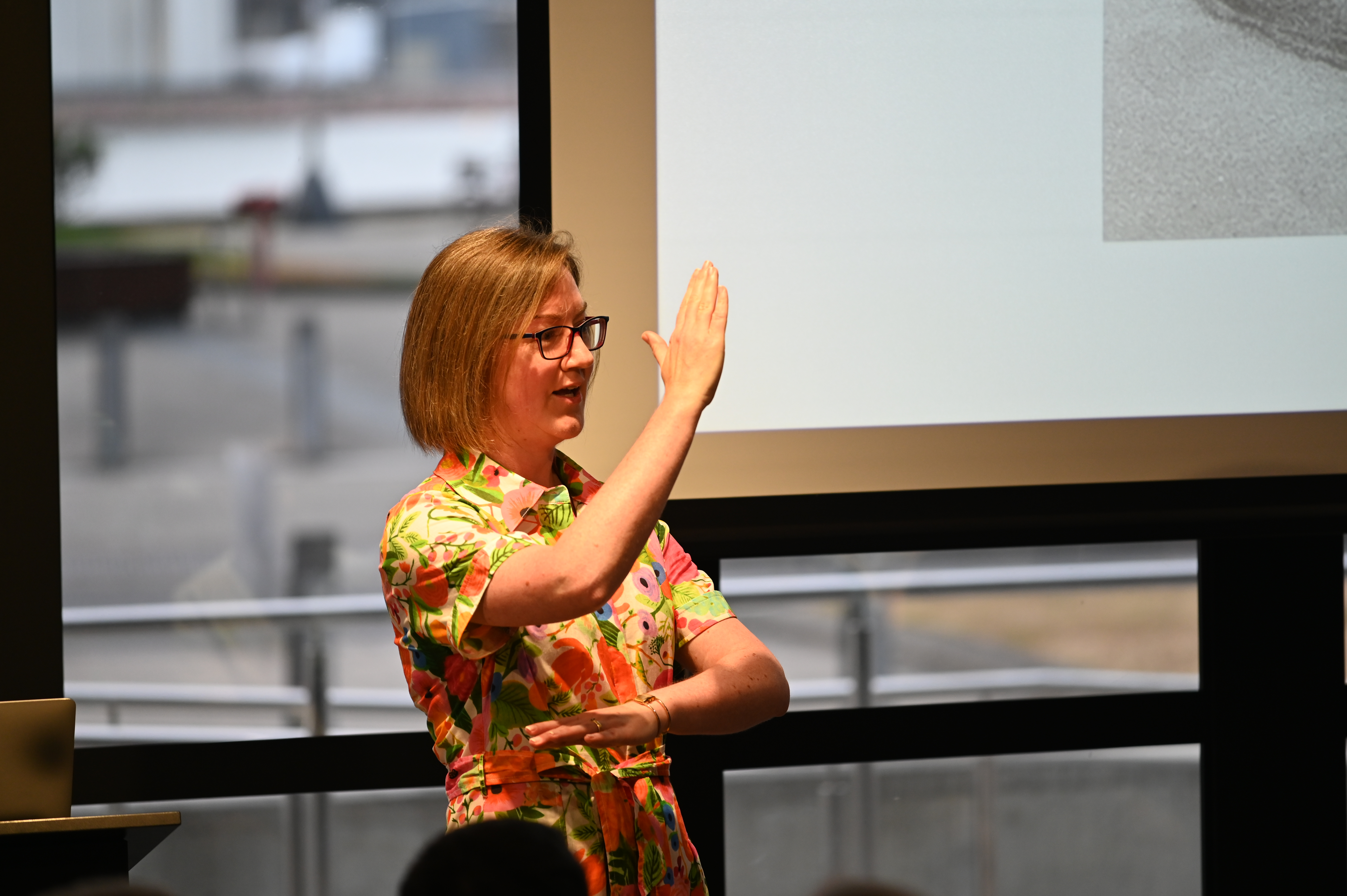
- Oct. 2023
- Education: University of Western Australia
- Employer: University of Newcastle
- Website: https://www.newcastle.edu.au/profile/karen-livesey

Karen L. Livesey is an Australian physicist, who is an associate professor at the University of Newcastle. She was named a Superstar of STEM by Science Technology Australia, in the 2023–2024 cohort.

== Education ==
Livesey was the first in her family to complete high school and went on to study physics at the University of Western Australia, where she was awarded a Bachelor of Science in 2004, and earned her PhD in 2010.

== Career ==
Livesey worked at the University of Colorado at Colorado Springs from 2012 to 2020, achieving the rank of associate professor. In 2020, during the COVID-19 pandemic, Livesey moved with her family to Newcastle, NSW, Australia. She is now an associate professor of physics at the University of Newcastle and also is an Associate Investigator at the ARC Centre of Excellence in Future Low Energy Electronic Technologies.

== Publications ==
Livesey has over 970 citations, and an H index of 16, as at May 2024, according to Google Scholar. Select publications include:

- KL Livesey, S Ruta, NR Anderson, D Baldomir, RW Chantrell, D Serantes, (2018) Beyond the blocking model to fit nanoparticle ZFC/FC magnetisation curves. Scientific Reports 8 (1), 11166.
- KL Livesey, RL Stamps (2010) High-frequency susceptibility of a weak ferromagnet with magnetostrictive magnetoelectric coupling: Using heterostructures to tailor electromagnon frequencies. Physical Review B 81 (9), 094405.

== Media ==
She published a physics paper, to the Journal of Magnetism and Magnetic Materials, where all four authors were women.

== Awards ==
- 2023 – Australian Awards for University Teaching Citation for Outstanding Contributions to Student Learning, "For development of engaging, contemporary physics curricula and resources that excite students about their studies and prepare them with skills for modern careers", Universities Australia.
- 2023 – Community Engagement Excellence Award, College of Engineering Science and Environment, the University of Newcastle.
- 2023 – Superstar of STEM, Science and Technology Australia.
- 2023 – Women in Physics Lecturer, Australian Institute of Physics.
- 2019 – Emmy Noether Visiting Fellow, Perimeter Institute for Theoretical Physics.
- 2016 – Europhysics Letters Distinguished Referee, European Physical Society.
