= Science & Technology Australia =

Australian science organisation

Science & Technology Australia (STA), formerly known as the Federation of Australian Scientific and Technological Societies (FASTS), is an organisation representing the interests of more than 90,000 Australian scientists and technologists, and promoting their views on a wide range of policy issues to the Australian Government, Australian industry, and the Australian community.

Science & Technology Australia is Australia’s peak body in science and technology and represents more than 90,000 Australian scientists and technologists working across all scientific disciplines. STA is a regular contributor to debate on public policy, with a mission to bring together scientists, governments, industry and the broader community to advance the role, reputation and impact of science and technology across the nation.

The organisation was known as the Federation of Australian Scientific and Technological Societies (FASTS) until June 2011. The Federation was formed in late 1985, as a reaction to the 1984 Australian Federal Budget, which made substantial cuts to funding for science; its formation followed the statements of the then Minister for Science, (Barry Jones), that the Australian science and technology community did not provide him with sufficient support in his dealings with cabinet. STA provides comment on Treasury and Australian federal budget submissions.

The organisation is best known for the annual Science Meets Parliament event, the Superstars of STEM program and the STEM Ambassadors program.

STA's CEO is Ryan Winn and its current President is Jas Chambers.

== Superstars of STEM ==
Superstars of STEM is a program, created in 2017, is designed to provide role models for women and non-binary people in STEM. The program provides media and science communications training, and is,

"a game-changing Australian initiative to smash gender assumptions about who can work in science, technology, engineering and maths... it has made a powerful contribution to start to tackle the serious gender inequity of visible diverse role models featured in the media as experts in STEM. Open to women and non-binary people, the program equips brilliant diverse STEM experts with advanced communication skills and opportunities - in the media, on stage and in schools."

Superstars of STEM who have made a significant presence in the media and impact with their science include:

- Young South Australian of the Year 2024, Tiahni Adamson,
- Vanessa Pirotta, Wildlife scientist,
- Muireann Irish, Cognitive neuroscientist,
- Parwinder Kaur, Biotechnologist,
- Caroline Ford, Medical researcher,
- Jessica Melbourne-Thomas, Marine ecologist,
- Celine Frere, Evolutionary biologist,
- Kate Cole, Engineer,
- Sue Barrell, Meteorologist,
- Susannah Elliott, Evidence advocate.

Superstars of STEM from various cohorts have gone on to become members of the Australian Academy of Technological Science and Engineering (see Susannah Eliott), Academy of Social Sciences (see Muireann Irish), or awarded Orders of Australia (see Sue Barrell).

== STA member societies ==
Science & Technology Australia members are societies and organisations that represent the professional interests of scientists and technologists across Australia. Members are split into different clusters.

As of April 2021 members include:

- Aboriginal and Torres Strait Islander Mathematics Alliance (ATSIMA)
- ARC Centre of Excellence in Future Low-Energy Electronics Technologies (FLEET)
- ARC Centre for Excellence in Engineered Quantum Systems (EQUS)
- ARC Centre of Excellence in Exciton Science (ACEx)
- Astronomical Society of Australia (ASA)
- AuScope
- Australia's Academic and Research Network (AARNET)
- Australian-American Fulbright Commission
- Australian and New Zealand Optical Society (ANZOS)
- Australian Cardiovascular Alliance (ACvA)
- Australian Coral Reef Society (ACRS)
- Australian Council of Deans of Information and Communications Technology (ACDICT)
- Australian Council of Deans of Science (ACDS)
- Australian Council of Engineering Deans (ACED)
- Australian Council of Environmental Deans and Directors (ACEDD)
- Australasian eResearch Organisations (AeRO)
- Australian Freshwater Sciences Society (AFSS)
- Australian Genomic Technologies Association (AGTA)
- Australian Geoscience Council (AGC)
- Australian Institute of Nuclear Science and Engineering (AINSE)
- Australian Institute of Physics
- Australian Mammal Society (AMS)
- Australian Mathematical Society (AustMS)
- Australian Marine Sciences Association Inc (AMSA)
- Australian Mathematical Sciences Institute (AMSI)
- Australian Meteorological Oceanographic Society (AMOS)
- Australian Microscopy & Microanalysis Society (AMMS)
- Australian Museum Research Institute
- Australian & New Zealand Optical Society (ANZOS)
- Australia Nuclear Association (ANA)
- Australian Neuroscience Society
- Australian Psychological Society (APS)
- Australian Physiological Society (AuPS)
- Australasian Quaternary Association (AQUA)
- Australian Radiation Protection Society (ARPS)
- Australian Society for Biochemistry and Molecular Biology (ASBMB)
- Australian Society for Biomaterials and Tissue Engineering (ASBTE)
- Australian Society for Biophysics (ASB)
- Australian Society for Fish Biology
- Australian Society for Operations Research (ASOR)
- The Australasian Society for Stem Cell Research (ASSCR)
- Australian Science Innovations
- Australian Society for Parasitology
- Australian Society for Phycology and Aquatic Botany (ASPAB)
- Australian Society of Clinical and Experimental Pharmacologists and Toxicologists (ASCEPT)
- Australian Society of Microbiology (ASM)
- Australian Society of Plant Scientists (ASPS)
- Australian Society of Viticulture and Oenology (ASVO)
- Baker Heart and Diabetes Institute
- Bioplatforms Australia
- Centre for Nanoscale BioPhotonics (CNBP)
- Cicada Innovations
- Computing Research and Education Association of Australia (CORE)
- Council of Australian Postgraduate Associations (CAPA)
- CSIRO Staff Association
- Deadly Science
- Ecological Society of Australia (ESA)
- Genetics Society of AustralAsia (GSA)
- High Blood Pressure Research Council of Australia (HBPRCA)
- Institute of Australian Geographers (IAG)
- International Ocean Discovery Program (IODP)
- Mathematics Education Research Group of Australia Incorporated (MERGA)
- Medicines Australia
- Monash Biomedicine Discovery Institute
- National Computational Infrastructure (NCI)
- National Tertiary Education Union (NTEU)
- National Youth Science Forum
- New Edge Microbials Pty Ltd
- Nutrition Society of Australia (NSA)
- Pawsey Supercomputing Centre
- Phenomics Australia
- Professionals Australia
- Psychology Foundation of Australia
- Reproductive Health Australia (RHA)
- Royal Australian Chemical Institute (RACI)
- Society for Reproductive Biology (SRB)
- Society of Crystallographers in Australia and New Zealand (SCANZ)
- Society of Environmental Toxicology and Chemistry Australia (SETAC)
- Soil Science Australia
- South Pacific Environmental Radioactivity Association (SPERA)
- Statistical Society of Australia (SSA)
- Therapeutic Innovations Australia
- The Royal Society of Victoria Inc.
- Women in Aviation International Australian Chapter (WAI)
- Women in STEMM Australia
