= Theresa Larkin =

Medical science educator and researcher

Theresa A Larkin
- Employer: University of Wollongong
- Known for: Medical research, anatomy, hormones
- Title: Associate Professor
- Website: https://scholars.uow.edu.au/theresa-larkin

Theresa A Larkin is an associate professor, medical science educator and researcher, science communicator and regular radio presenter, and Superstar of STEM from Science Technology Australia, in the 2023–24 cohort.

== Education and career ==
Larkin has a Bachelor of Science (hons) in chemistry, a Masters of Higher Education, and a PhD in Biomedical Sciences from the University of Wollongong, in 2005, from the School of Medicine.

Larkin lectures in anatomy and physiology to medical students. She conducts research on hormones and health, and clinical anatomy, focusing on the impact of hormones on depression and anxiety, the causes of chronic pelvic pain, and the influence of hip muscle strength on knee and back pain.

Larkin is an advocate for equity, diversity, and inclusion, and for improving the accessibility of STEM. She serves as a mentor for the HSC Science Extension subject.

== Publications ==
Larkin has over 1280 citations, as of May 2024, and an h-index of 20, according to Google Scholar. Select publications include:

- Larkin TA, WE Price, L Astheimer (2008) The key importance of soy isoflavone bioavailability to understanding health benefits. Critical reviews in food science and nutrition 48 (6), 538–552.
- Larkin TA, Deen R, Amirnezami T, Shvartsbart A, Villalba L (2024) Pharmacomechanical thrombectomy of iliofemoral deep vein thrombosis is associated with a low incidence of post-thrombotic syndrome and perioperative complications, ANZ Journal of Surgery 94(3):438-444
- Villalba L, Larkin TA (2023) Outcomes of dedicated iliac venous stents during pregnancy and postpartum. European Journal of Vascular and Endovascular Surgery66(1):e12.
- Noonan SHJ, Larkin TA (2023) Associations among maternal characteristics, labour interventions, delivery mode and maternal antenatal complications in a NSW large rural town, and comparison to NSW state data. Australian Journal of Rural Health. 31(3):417-425.

== Media ==
Larkin has been a keynote speaker, on topics such as burnout for women in the media. She has also contributed extensively to the media, including Pint of Science, 12 articles in The Conversation, on topics including, why blood is red, burnout and depression, hormones and chemotherapy, hay fever, vagus nerves, and lymph nodes.

Larkin has also contributed to the ABC in print, radio, on dopamine, on sunscreen labels, and how to protect your skin, on why the science behind the vagus nerve and cortisol, and ways to improve these are in social media.

== Awards ==
- 2022 – Superstar of STEM, Science Technology Australia.
- 2015 – National Teaching Award for innovative practices in anatomy.
