= Caroline Ford =

Caroline Ford may refer to:

- Caroline Ford (academic), American academic
- Caroline Ford (beauty queen), American beauty queen
- Caroline Ford (actress) (born 1988), English actress
- Caroline Ford (medical researcher), Australian scientist
