= Anna Barwick =

Australian telepharmacy academic

- Education: Charles Sturt University; University of Queensland; University of Technology Sydney
- Occupations: Pharmacist, academic, telehealth innovator
- Employer(s): University of New England; PharmOnline; ACOP Pharmacist, Walcha MPS
- Known for: Founder of PharmOnline

Anna Barwick is an Australian pharmacist, academic, and founder of the telepharmacy company PharmOnline. She has over a decade of experience as a clinical pharmacist in hospital, aged care, and community settings, with a focus on rural practice. Barwick received the Medal of the Order of Australia (OAM) in the 2025 Australia Day Honours for her service to the pharmacy profession.

== Early life and education ==
Barwick grew up in Peak Hill, New South Wales and attended Peak Hill Central School. She completed a Bachelor of Pharmacy (Hons) at Charles Sturt University in 2008, a Master of Clinical Pharmacy at the University of Queensland (2011–2018), and a Graduate Certificate in Diabetes Education and Management at the University of Technology Sydney in 2021. She also holds a Certificate IV in Training and Assessment (2020–2022) and completed the Australian Institute of Company Directors course in 2024. Barwick is completing a PhD in Pharmacy Practice (telepharmacy) at the University of Queensland (2019–2025).

== Career ==
Barwick began her career at Parkes Pharmacy (2009–2010) before working as a hospital pharmacist in Tamworth (2011) and Armidale (2012–2021). She joined the University of New England in 2012 as a Pharmacy Practice Lecturer, later serving as a Problem-Based Learning Tutor (2022) and Senior Lecturer in Pharmacy (2022–2024). In February 2025, she became a Medicine Year 1 PBL Tutor in the UNE–University of Newcastle Joint Medical Program.

In 2020, during the COVID-19 pandemic, Barwick founded PharmOnline, Australia’s first pharmacist-led telehealth service. The service connects patients in rural and remote areas, or those with barriers to in-person pharmacy access, to pharmacists via telehealth. Initiatives include the Pharmacist After Hours Advice Line in Tasmania and the Gestational Diabetes Thrive Program, funded by the NSW Government.

Since January 2025, Barwick has also worked as an Accredited Consultant Onsite Pharmacist (ACOP) at Walcha Multipurpose Service. She has been Director of PharmOnline since 2020 and Non-Executive Director of the Hunter New England and Central Coast Primary Health Network since December 2024.

== Research and advocacy ==
Barwick’s research focuses on rural health, women’s health, telepharmacy, deprescribing of potentially harmful medicines, domestic and family violence support, gestational diabetes, and medical termination of pregnancy. She is a diabetes educator, asthma educator, and pharmacist immuniser.

== Professional roles ==
Barwick has held several leadership and advisory positions:

- Vice-President, Pharmaceutical Society of Australia NSW Branch Committee (2014–2018)
- Chair, Intern Training Program Review Project Advisory Group (2019–2020)
- Chair, Practice Support and Education Committee (2018–2020)
- NSW representative, National Early Career Pharmacists Working Group (2018–2019)
- Member, NSW Poisons Advisory Committee
- Member, NSW Regional Health Ministerial Advisory Panel
- Rural Observer, Society of Hospital Pharmacists of Australia NSW Branch (2014–2017)
- Treasurer, NSW Rural Women’s Gathering (2018–2020)
- Board Member, HNECC Primary Health Network (from 2024)

== Awards ==
- 2008 – NAPSA Spirit of Congress Award
- 2021 – PSA Shark Tank People’s Choice Award
- 2021 – Pharmaceutical Society of Australia NSW Pharmacist of the Year
- 2021 – Future Women NSW Rural Scholarship
- 2021 – NSW Rural Doctors Network Health Workforce Scholarship
- 2022 – NSW Minerals Council Regional Woman of the Year Award
- 2022 – NSW Premier's Woman of the Year Award
- 2022 – AgriFutures NSW–ACT Rural Women’s Award Finalist
- 2023 – Fellow, Australian and New Zealand College of Advanced Pharmacy
- 2023–2024 – Science & Technology Australia Superstar of STEM
- 2025 – Medal of the Order of Australia (OAM)

== Personal life ==
Barwick lives in Walcha, New South Wales, where she and her husband manage a rural property and Australian Stock Horse stud. They have two children.
