= Trish Kerin =

Australian chemical engineer

- Occupation: Director
- Employer: IChemE Safety Centre (ISC)
- Known for: Process Safety
- Website: https://leadlikekerin.com/

Trish Kerin is an Australian safety expert, engineer, and was director of the Institution of Chemical Engineers (IChemE), science communicator, and one of the Science Technology Australia, Superstars of STEM 2023–2024 cohort.

== Education ==
Kerin graduated with honours in mechanical engineering at RMIT in 1994. Following graduation, Kerin worked for several years in project management, operational and safety roles for the gas, chemical and oil industries.

== Career ==
Kerin has been a board member of the Australian National Offshore Petroleum Safety and Environmental Management Authority. She is a Chartered Engineer, registered Professional Process Safety Engineer, as well as a Fellow of IChemE, Engineers Australia and a senior member of the American Institute of Chemical Engineers. Kerin also holds a diploma in OHS, as well as a Master of Leadership and is a Graduate of the Australian Institute of Company Directors.

Kerin is the director of the IChemE Safety Centre, and leads a team that helps organisations share and learn about process safety. Kerin uses her engineering experience and leadership to help organisations improve process safety outcomes.

Kerin's work involves safety and risk minimisation in the workplace. She commented, in The Chemical Engineer publication,

“People have a right to stay safe, no matter where they are. As chemical engineers address our global challenges and pivot our technologies to deliver a low-carbon future, all those engaged in process safety will be a crucial component in minimising the risk of operating in new fields.”

== Publications ==
Kerin is the author of two books, "The Platypus Philosophy", on how to identify and manage weak signals, in safety processing. The second book is "Lets talk about your leadership", learning through the art of storytelling.

Select peer-reviewed publications include:

Kerin, T. (2016) The evolution of process safety standards and legislation following landmark events—what have we learnt? Process Safety Progress 35 (2), 165–170–17.

Kerin, T. (2018) Accounting for hindsight bias: improving learning through interactive case studies. Loss Prevention Bulletin. 264: 17.

Kerin, T. (2020) Taming the wild river rapids: How process safety can apply outside the process industries. Process safety progress 39 (1), e12088.

== Media ==
Kerin was interviewed for Occham's Razor, on the ABC, about chemical safety and improving safety processes, with Tegan Taylor. They discussed how "everyone has a right to be safe at work", and Kerin shared a creative way to encourage spotting warning signs early, saving mistakes ahead of time.

Kerin also hosts a podcast with Endeavour Business Media's Chemical Processing Magazine called "Process Safety with Trish and Traci", as well as regular column called "Stay Safe".

== Awards ==
- 2023-2024 – Science Technology Australia, Superstars of STEM.
- 2022 – ASBPE Bronze Award.
- 2022 – Leader of the Year award from Women in Safety in 2022.
- 2018 – Mary Kay O'Connor Process Safety Centre Trevor Kletz Merit award.
