= Homeward Bound (organisation) =

Australian leadership program

- Founded: 2015; 11 years ago in Tasmania, Australia
- Founders: Fabian Dattner; Jessica Melbourne-Thomas
- Website: homewardboundprojects.com.au

Homeward Bound is an organisation based in Australia that holds leadership programs for women in science. Founded in 2015, the leadership program aims to increase the representation of women in leadership roles in science fields.

Homeward Bound participants go through a twelve month training program that is focused on the topic of climate change and concludes with a three-week expedition to Antarctica. The first Homeward Bound expedition in 2016 attracted media attention as it was the largest ever all-woman expedition to Antarctica, with 76 participating scientists. Expeditions organised in the following years have had more participants.

== Program ==
Australian marine ecologist Jessica Melbourne-Thomas and entrepreneur Fabian Dattner founded Homeward Bound in 2015 out of discussions regarding the challenges encountered by women in science. Until the mid-20th century, women were discouraged from exploring Antarctica. Only in 1969 did the first American team of women researchers reach the continent.

The goal of Homeward Bound is to increase the representation of women in leadership roles in science fields. To that end, it plans to organise expeditions to Antarctica for a decade and establish a network of a thousand women capable of taking on these roles and shaping policy. The program has participants go through twelve months of leadership training based around the topic of climate change. It is concluded with a three-week expedition to Antarctica, where participants observe the effects of climate change on Antarctica.

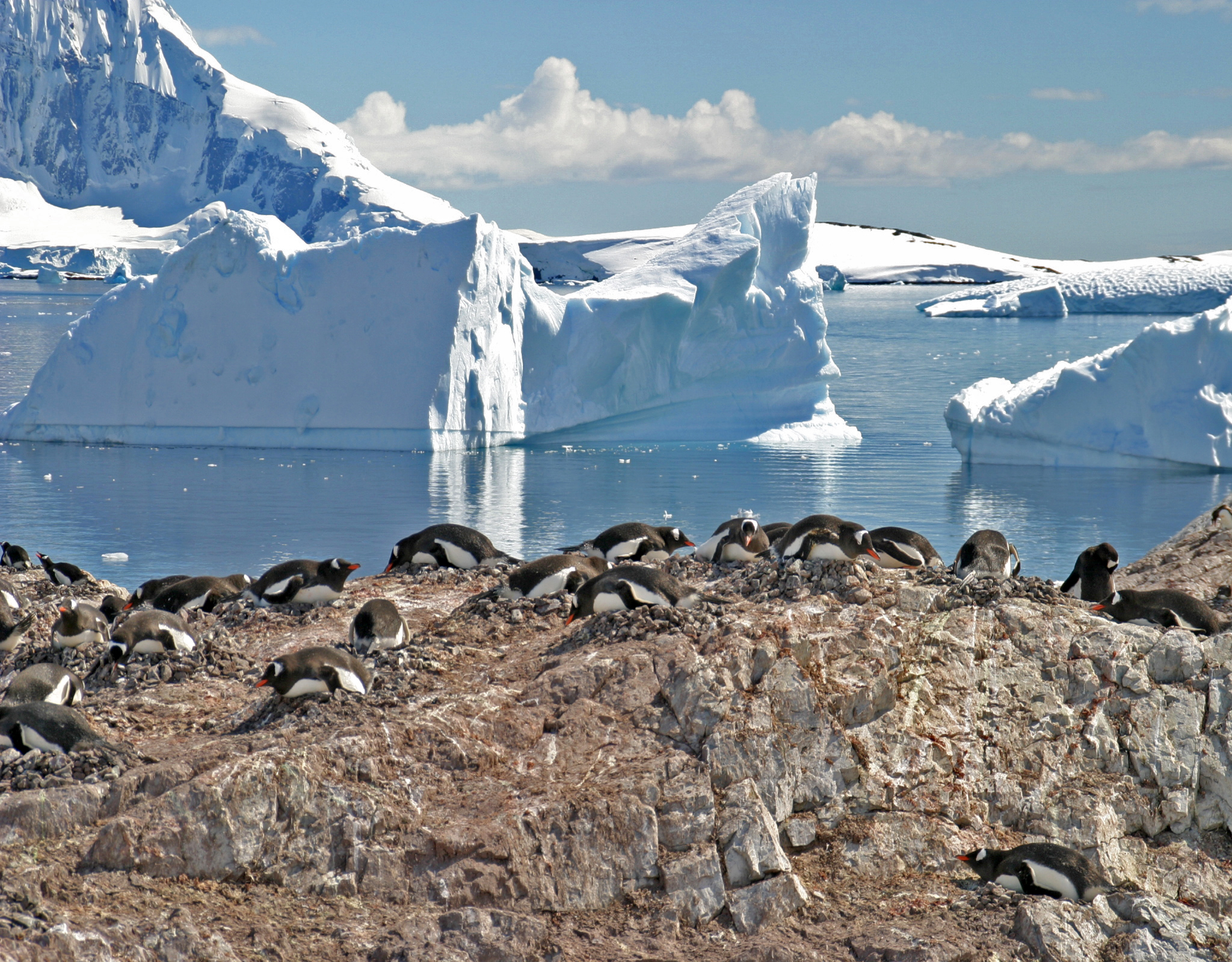
Gentoo penguins on the Antarctic Peninsula

== History ==
In 2016, Homeward Bound made its inaugural Antarctic expedition with seventy-six scientists from various fields, then reported to be the largest all-woman expedition to Antarctica. Lack of government support prevented them from sailing out of Tasmania, where the program was founded, and instead launch was set in Ushuaia, Argentina. They departed on 2 December and spent twenty days at sea, exploring the Antarctic Peninsula and landing at various American and Argentinian research stations. A documentary on the first expedition, The Leadership, covered participants' experiences and criticism of the program, including allegations of harassment and assault experienced by some participants; claims of one such sexual assault were first published in a 2018 article in Grist magazine.

Homeward Bound made its next two expeditions in 2018. A second group of seventy-eight participants embarked in February and a third group of eighty participants did so in December. A fourth group of one hundred participants made the expedition in November 2019. Each of the three expeditions was reported to be the largest all-woman expedition to Antarctica at its time. In 2019, participants were selected for a fifth expedition in 2020, however this was delayed until 2023 due to the COVID-19 pandemic.

In October 2020, a coalition of 289 scientists and conservation experts associated with Homeward Bound called for the creation of a new marine protected area around the western Antarctic Peninsula. The commentary was published in Nature just as governments convened for the Commission for the Conservation of Antarctic Marine Living Resources.

In 2021, a sixth program of 100 participants was reported to leave in early 2022.

== See also ==
- Timeline of women in Antarctica
- Women in Antarctica
