= Jessica Melbourne-Thomas =

Marine ecologist and ecosystem modeller (born 1981)

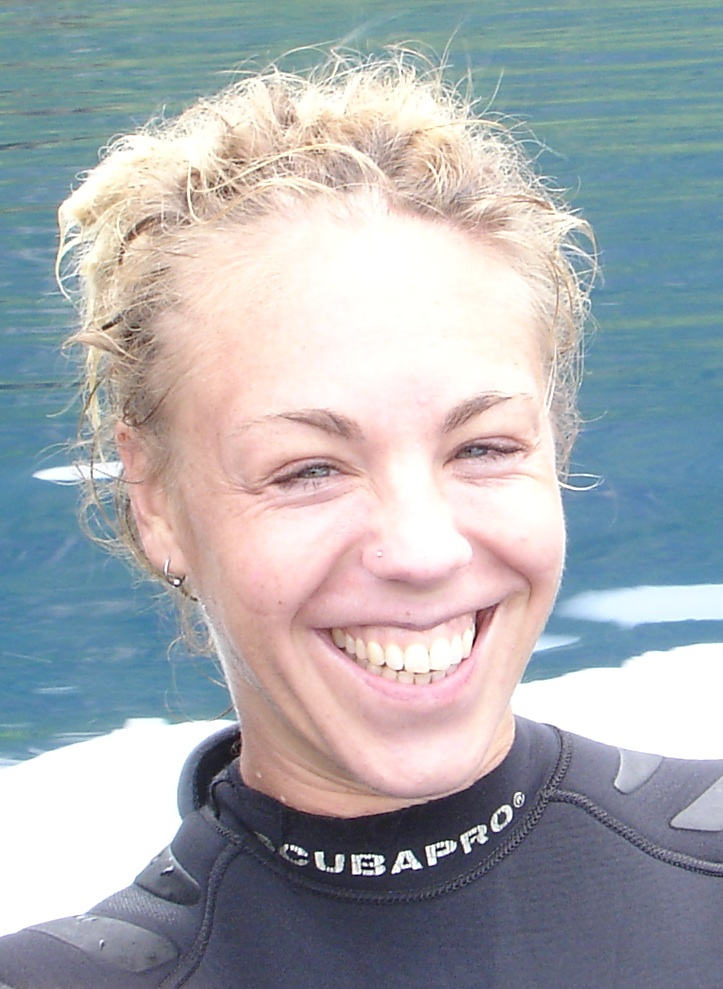
- Born: 17 May 1981 (age 45)
- Other name: Jess Melbourne-Thomas
- Education: University of Tasmania; University of Oxford
- Scientific career
- Fields: Marine ecology, Ecosystem modelling
- Workplaces: Parks Australia

Jessica Melbourne-Thomas (born 17 May 1981) is an Australian science leader with Parks Australia. Her research focuses on climate change, its effects on the marine environment, and how to adapt and response to these changes.

== Early life and education ==
Jessica Melbourne-Thomas was born on 17 May 1981.

She completed her undergraduate degree at the University of Tasmania in 2002. She then moved to the UK to the University of Oxford to undertake her Rhodes Scholarship from 2003 to 2005 working on coral community dynamics.

In 2010 she completed her PhD, which developed modelling tools to assist managers in their management of coral reefs, at the University of Tasmania.

== Career ==
Melbourne-Thomas is the Director of Conservation Science with Parks Australia. Her work focuses on bridging the gap between complex scientific research and decision-making for sustainability, particularly in relation to climate change adaptation. She worked as a marine ecologist and knowledge broker with CSIRO and as an ecosystem modeller and science communicator with the Australian Antarctic Division. She was a lead author for the IPCC's Special Report on Oceans and Cryosphere in a Changing Climate in 2019.

Melbourne-Thomas is highly engaged in science communication and the translation of science into decision-making, including through outreach to end-users and policy briefings. She is a co-presenter for the Massive Open Online Course (MOOC) on Open2Study entitled Marine and Antarctic Science. She was named Tasmania's Young Tall Poppy of the Year in 2015 and was one of Science and Technology Australia's first 30 Superstars of STEM.

Melbourne-Thomas was also the co-founder, along with business entrepreneur Fabian Dattner, of the first Homeward Bound voyage, which is an Australian-led, global initiative to foster women's leadership in science. Recognizing the difficulties women in science careers have in obtaining funding, balancing the demands of families and careers, the initiative is privately funded. Her role was to coordinate the science program for the 2016 Homeward Bound program. When challenges prevented the group of 76 global women scientists of varying specialities from sailing out of Australia, Melbourne-Thomas worked to reorganize the launch out of Ushuaia, Argentina. After completion of the research trip, applications were opened for a second voyage and the team was finalized in 2017. They sailed on their second expedition in 2018.

She was one of 12 noted female scientists to be featured as a constellation on the ceiling of the Grand Central Station (New York City) as part of GE's Balance the Equation Initiative.

Melbourne-Thomas is the 2020 Tasmanian Australian of the Year.

Melbourne-Thomas has been published in ICES Journal of Marine Science, Proceedings of the National Academy of Sciences, Nature ecology & evolution, Frontiers in Marine Science, Global Change Biology, Ecology and Society Ecological Applications, Journal of Marine Systems, and PLoS One.

== Awards and honors ==
- 2003-2005: Rhodes Scholarship
- 2015: Tasmania's Young Tall Poppy of the Year
- 2017: Women's Agenda Leadership Awards (finalist)
- 2017: Science and Technology Australia, 30 Superstars of STEM
- 2020: Tasmanian Australian of the Year
- 2023: Tasmanian Honour Roll of Women inductee

== Selected works and publications ==
- Melbourne-Thomas, J.; Wotherspoon, S.; Raymond, B.; Constable, A. (November 2012). "Comprehensive evaluation of model uncertainty in qualitative network analyses". Ecological Monographs. 82 (4): 505–519. doi:10.1890/12-0207.1. S2CID 86167632.
- Melbourne-Thomas, Jessica; Constable, Andrew; Wotherspoon, Simon; Raymond, Ben; Ropert-Coudert, Yan (6 February 2013). "Testing Paradigms of Ecosystem Change under Climate Warming in Antarctica". PLoS ONE. 8 (2) e55093. Bibcode:2013PLoSO...855093M. doi:10.1371/journal.pone.0055093. PMC 3566216. PMID 23405116.
- Constable, Andrew J.; Melbourne-Thomas, Jessica; Corney, Stuart P.; Arrigo, Kevin R.; Barbraud, Christophe; Barnes, David K. A.; Bindoff, Nathaniel L.; Boyd, Philip W.; Brandt, Angelika; Costa, Daniel P.; Davidson, Andrew T.; Ducklow, Hugh W.; Emmerson, Louise; Fukuchi, Mitsuo; Gutt, Julian; Hindell, Mark A.; Hofmann, Eileen E.; Hosie, Graham W.; Iida, Takahiro; Jacob, Sarah; Johnston, Nadine M.; Kawaguchi, So; Kokubun, Nobuo; Koubbi, Philippe; Lea, Mary-Anne; Makhado, Azwianewi; Massom, Rob A.; Meiners, Klaus; Meredith, Michael P.; Murphy, Eugene J.; Nicol, Stephen; Reid, Keith; Richerson, Kate; Riddle, Martin J.; Rintoul, Stephen R.; Smith, Walker O.; Southwell, Colin; Stark, Jonathon S.; Sumner, Michael; Swadling, Kerrie M.; Takahashi, Kunio T.; Trathan, Phil N.; Welsford, Dirk C.; Weimerskirch, Henri; Westwood, Karen J.; Wienecke, Barbara C.; Wolf-Gladrow, Dieter; Wright, Simon W.; Xavier, Jose C.; Ziegler, Philippe (October 2014). "Climate change and Southern Ocean ecosystems I: how changes in physical habitats directly affect marine biota". Global Change Biology. 20 (10): 3004–3025. Bibcode:2014GCBio..20.3004C. doi:10.1111/gcb.12623. PMID 24802817. S2CID 7584865.
- Marzloff, Martin Pierre; Melbourne-Thomas, Jessica; Hamon, Katell G.; Hoshino, Eriko; Jennings, Sarah; van Putten, Ingrid E.; Pecl, Gretta T. (July 2016). "Modelling marine community responses to climate-driven species redistribution to guide monitoring and adaptive ecosystem-based management". Global Change Biology. 22 (7): 2462–2474. Bibcode:2016GCBio..22.2462M. doi:10.1111/gcb.13285. PMID 26990671.
- Constable, Andrew J.; Costa, Daniel P.; Schofield, Oscar; Newman, Louise; Urban, Edward R.; Fulton, Elizabeth A.; Melbourne-Thomas, Jessica; Ballerini, Tosca; Boyd, Philip W.; Brandt, Angelika; de la Mare, William K.; Edwards, Martin; Eléaume, Marc; Emmerson, Louise; Fennel, Katja; Fielding, Sophie; Griffiths, Huw; Gutt, Julian; Hindell, Mark A.; Hofmann, Eileen E.; Jennings, Simon; La, Hyoung Sul; McCurdy, Andrea; Mitchell, B. Greg; Moltmann, Tim; Muelbert, Monica; Murphy, Eugene; Press, Anthony J.; Raymond, Ben; Reid, Keith; Reiss, Christian; Rice, Jake; Salter, Ian; Smith, David C.; Song, Sun; Southwell, Colin; Swadling, Kerrie M.; Van de Putte, Anton; Willis, Zdenka (September 2016). "Developing priority variables ("ecosystem Essential Ocean Variables" — eEOVs) for observing dynamics and change in Southern Ocean ecosystems". Journal of Marine Systems. 161: 26–41. Bibcode:2016JMS...161...26C. doi:10.1016/j.jmarsys.2016.05.003. hdl:2013/ULB-DIPOT:oai:dipot.ulb.ac.be:2013/337826.
- Melbourne-Thomas, J.; Corney, S. P.; Trebilco, R.; Meiners, K. M.; Stevens, R. P.; Kawaguchi, S.; Sumner, M. D.; Constable, A. J. (4 October 2016). "Under ice habitats for Antarctic krill larvae: Could less mean more under climate warming?". Geophysical Research Letters. 43 (19): 10, 322–10, 327. Bibcode:2016GeoRL..4310322M. doi:10.1002/2016GL070846. S2CID 59478431.
- Melbourne-Thomas, Jessica; Constable, Andrew J; Fulton, Elizabeth A; Corney, Stuart P; Trebilco, Rowan; Hobday, Alistair J; Blanchard, Julia L; Boschetti, Fabio; Bustamante, Rodrigo H; Cropp, Roger; Everett, Jason D; Fleming, Aysha; Galton-Fenzi, Ben; Goldsworthy, Simon D; Lenton, Andrew; Lara-Lopez, Ana; Little, Rich; Marzloff, Martin P; Matear, Richard; Mongin, Mathieu; Plagányi, Eva; Proctor, Roger; Risbey, James S; Robson, Barbara J; Smith, David C; Sumner, Michael D; van Putten, E Ingrid; Travers-Trolet, Morgane (1 December 2017). "Integrated modelling to support decision-making for marine social–ecological systems in Australia". ICES Journal of Marine Science. 74 (9): 2298–2308. doi:10.1093/icesjms/fsx078.
