= Kate Cole (engineer) =

Australian engineer and occupational hygienist

Kate Cole is an Australian engineer and occupational hygienist whose work has helped protect the health and safety of construction workers, particularly by controlling respirable crystalline silica or "silica dust".

== Career ==
Cole has a Bachelor of Science (Biotechnology) and Master of Environmental Engineering Management from the University of Technology, a Master of Science (Occupational Hygiene Practice) from the University of Wollongong. She is also a graduate of the Australian Institute of Company Directors.

Cole's work was heavily influenced by a Winston Churchill Fellowship in 2016, that investigated best practice approaches to preventing illness and disease in tunnel construction workers in Norway, Switzerland, United Kingdom and the USA.

Cole runs her own consultancy company Cole Health. She is also the 2022 President of the Australian Institute of Occupational Hygienists.

She also advised on ventilation, respiratory protection, and health and safety during the COVID-19 pandemic.

== Awards ==
Cole was named as one of the Top 100 Women of Influence by the Australian Financial Review in 2018 and is also one of Science & Technology Australia's Superstars of STEM for 2019–2020.

In 2022, she was awarded the Medal of the Order of Australia for her work protecting the health of workers on large-scale infrastructure projects and was included on the COVID-19 Honour Roll for her work during the pandemic.

She was awarded the Kernot Memorial Medal by the University of Melbourne for her contribution to health and safety advocacy in engineering in 2025.

== Media ==
Cole speaks about preventing silicosis and other silica-related diseases on the ABC radio national.
