= Vanessa Pirotta =

Wildlife scientist and science communicator

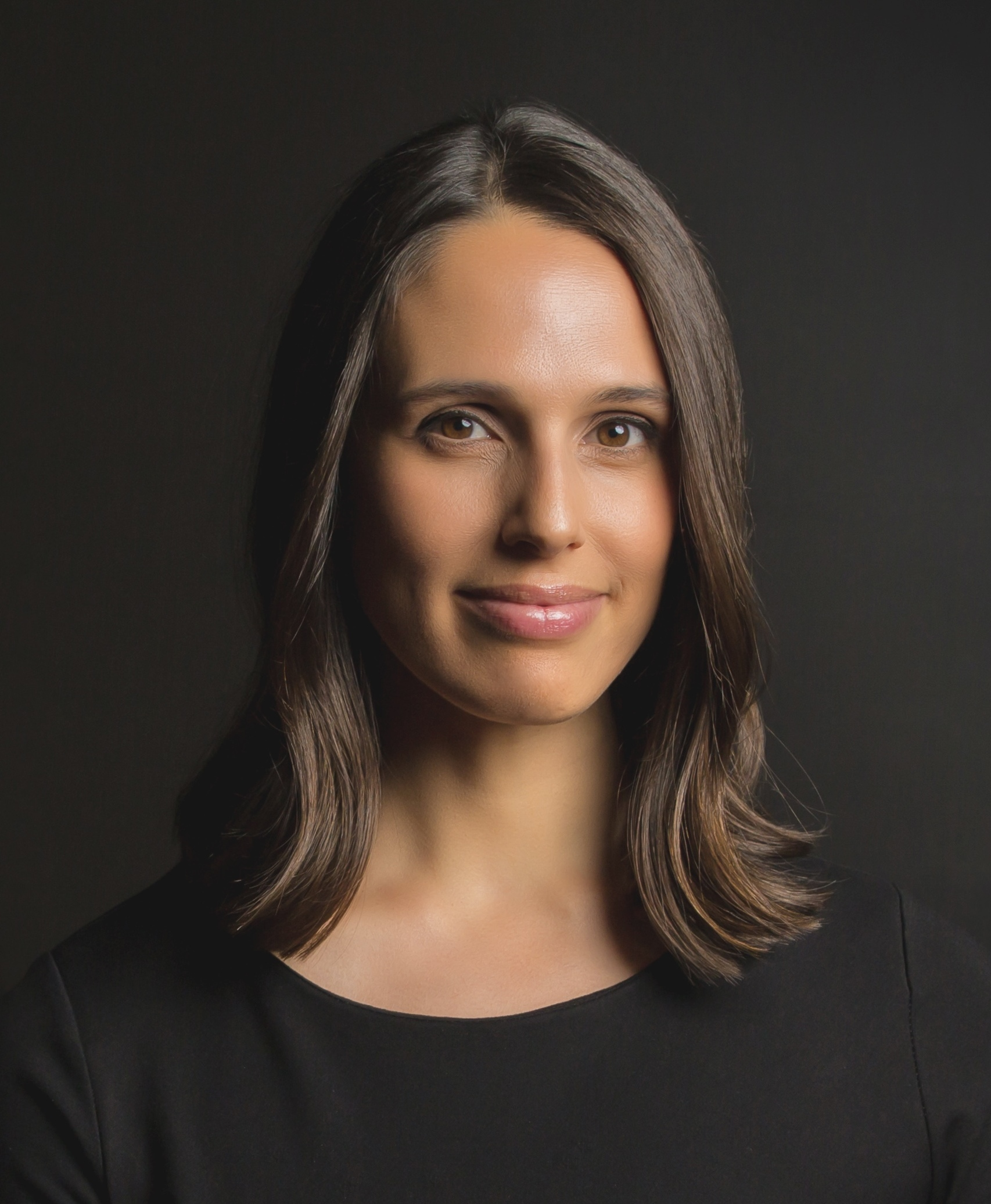
- Pirotta in 2019
- Education: Australian National University (BSc, 2010); Macquarie University (MRes, PhD)
- Known for: Using drones to collect whale "snot" (blow) to assess whale health
- Awards: FameLab Australia (2018); Australian Financial Review 100 Women of Influence (2019); Superstars of STEM (2021); Celestino Eureka Prize for Promoting Understanding of Science (2025); Australian of the Year for New South Wales (2027)
- Scientific career
- Fields: Zoology, wildlife conservation, science communication
- Workplaces: Macquarie University
- Thesis: Conceptual and practical approaches to aid the conservation of cetaceans (2018)
- Doctoral advisor: Robert Harcourt
- Website: vanessapirotta.com

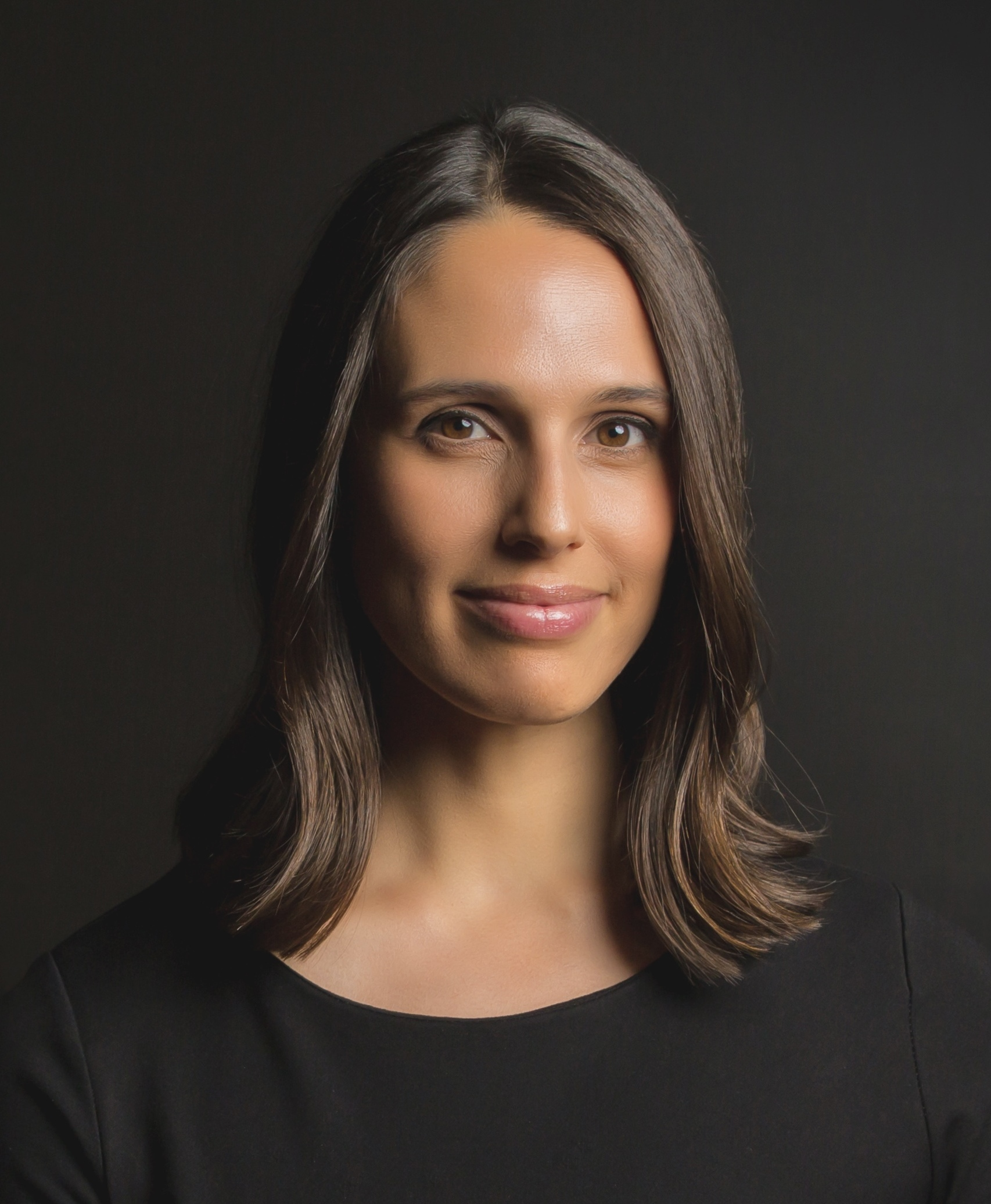
Pirotta in 2019

Vanessa Pirotta is an Australian wildlife scientist, science communicator and author. Her research uses innovative technologies, like drones and AI, for wildlife conservation. Pirotta is the founder and chief scientist of Wild Sydney Harbour, a scientific and citizen science program which is learning more about marine life in Sydney Harbour, Australia. She has published children's books about whales.

== Career ==
Pirotta completed a Bachelor of Science in zoology/animal biology at the Australian National University in 2010. Her Masters of Research in Conservation Biology at Macquarie University in 2014, and her PhD in marine sciences at Macquarie University in 2018. Her PhD research focused on the conservation of marine wildlife, investigating human induced and natural threats to cetaceans (whale, dolphin and porpoise) around the world, conducting research in Tonga, Madagascar and Antarctica. She is most recognised for her use of drones to collect whale snot (visible plumes of spray) in order to conduct an assessment of whale health. Pirotta has written for Vogue Australia and The Conversation.

== Publications ==
=== Papers ===
- Prendergast, Kit, Vanderstock, Amelie, Neilly, Heather, Ross, Catherine, Pirotta, Vanessa, and Tegart, Patrick (2021). Potential and pitfalls of citizen science with children: Reflections on Pollinators in the Playground project. Austral Ecology.
- Pirotta V, Shen K, Liu S, Phan HTH, O'Brien JK, Meagher P, Mitchell J, Willis J and Morton E (2022). Detecting illegal wildlife trafficking via real time tomography 3D X-ray imaging and automated algorithms. Frontiers in Conservation Science.
- Pirotta, Vanessa, David P. Hocking, Jason Iggleden, and Robert Harcourt. (2022). Drone Observations of Marine Life and Human–Wildlife Interactions off Sydney, Australia. Drones 6, no. 3: 75.
- Brasier M and Pirotta V (2022) Humpback Whales Have Super Feeding Events in Australian Waters. Frontiers for Young Minds. 10:713720.
- Pirotta, V., Franklin, W., Mansfield, L., Lowe, J., and Peterson, O. (2023). Sighting records of "Migaloo" the white humpback whale provide evidence of Australian site fidelity and use of New Zealand waters as a migratory route. Australian Zoologist
- Raoult, V., Pirotta, V., Gaston, T.F., Norman, B., Reynolds, S., Smith, T.M., Double, M., How, J., and Hayward, M.W. (2023). Widespread exposure of marine parks, whales, and whale sharks to shipping. Marine and Freshwater Research

=== Children's books ===
- Humpback Highway, Diving into the mysterious world of whales (UNSW Press, 2024).
- Oceans at Night (CSIRO Publishing, 2024).
- The Voyage of Whale and Calf (CSIRO Publishing, 2022).

== Awards and prizes ==
- 2018 winner of FameLab Australia.
- 2019 Australian Financial Review 100 Women of Influence.
- 2021 Science & Technology Australia Superstar of STEM.
- 2025 Celestino Eureka Prize for Promoting Understanding of Science.
