= Tiahni Adamson =

Australian wildlife conservation biologist

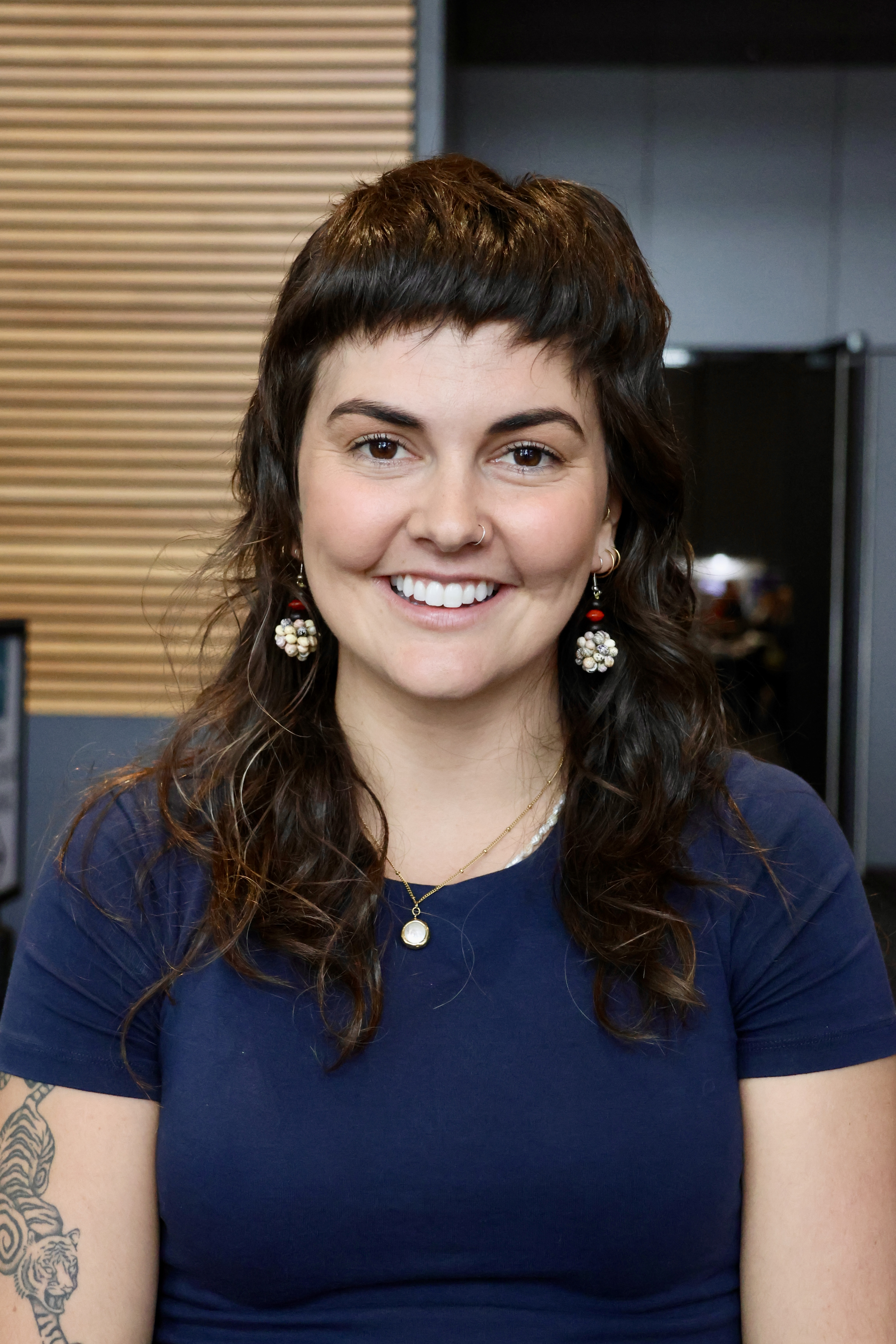
- Adamson in 2025
- Born: Tiahni Jade Adamson; 1994/1995 (age 30–31); Adelaide, South Australia, Australia
- Education: University of Adelaide (BSc)
- Occupation: Wildlife conservation biologist
- Known for: Environmental and Indigenous activism
- Tiahni Adamson's voice Adamson speaking about climate change Recorded 9 May 2025

Tiahni Jade Adamson (born 1994/1995) is an Australian wildlife conservation biologist and advocate for Indigenous Australians and women in STEM. Adamson is an Aboriginal and Torres Strait Islander of Kaurareg descent. She grew up on the Eyre Peninsula and first studied veterinary medicine at the University of Adelaide before transferring to science with a major in biodiversity conservation. She graduated in 2020 with a Bachelor of Science in wildlife conservation biology. While at university, she was awarded the Indigenous Time at Sea Scholarship and participated in the inaugural voyage of the RV Investigator in 2019–2020 to conduct marine and atmospheric science research.

Adamson is an environmental campaigner who has worked with Commonwealth Scientific and Industrial Research Organisation (CSIRO), Primary Industries and Regions SA (PIRSA), and CH4 Global in working towards climate action through the incorporation of Indigenous knowledge. She sits on the Green Adelaide Board, Uluru Statement youth collective, and Seed leadership.

Adamson has been recognised for her activism, environmental science work, and advocacy on behalf of First Nations. She was 2024's Young South Australian of the Year and has been featured by national media for her leadership and climate justice work. Adamson was named the Superstar of STEM 2023–24, was a finalist for South Australian Woman of the Year 2023, appeared in InDaily's 40 Under 40, and has received other CSIRO and Indigenous awards.

== Early life and education ==
Tiahni Jade Adamson, born in Adelaide in 1994 or 1995, is an Aboriginal and Torres Strait Islander of Kaurareg heritage from Thursday Island. She spent part of her childhood with her mother, a paramedic, living on Palm Island in Queensland and in Port Augusta, before settling in Coffin Bay on South Australia's Eyre Peninsula, where she developed an early interest in sustainability.

In 2010, she attended the CSIRO's Aboriginal Summer School for Excellence in Science and Technology (ASSETS). In 2015, she was made an Indigenous ambassador at La Trobe University. The following year, she traveled to the Philippines as part of a university cultural exchange, where she took part in conversations regarding Indigenous modernism, student relations, and the creation of an Indigenous art gallery.

Adamson later enrolled at the University of Adelaide to study veterinary medicine but switched to biodiversity during her third year. She graduated in 2020 with a Bachelor of Science in wildlife conservation biology. At university, she was one of the first recipients of the Indigenous Time at Sea Scholarship and went on to participate in the first research voyage of the RV Investigator in late 2019, which investigated the ocean and atmosphere off the west coast of Australia. (Note: The expedition departed Darwin on 23 December 2019 and arrived in Fremantle on 2 January 2020, after ten days studying the ocean and atmosphere along the west coast.) She has also worked with CSIRO on Indigenous education initiatives and was trained by Al Gore as a Climate Reality Leader in 2019.

== Activism and career ==
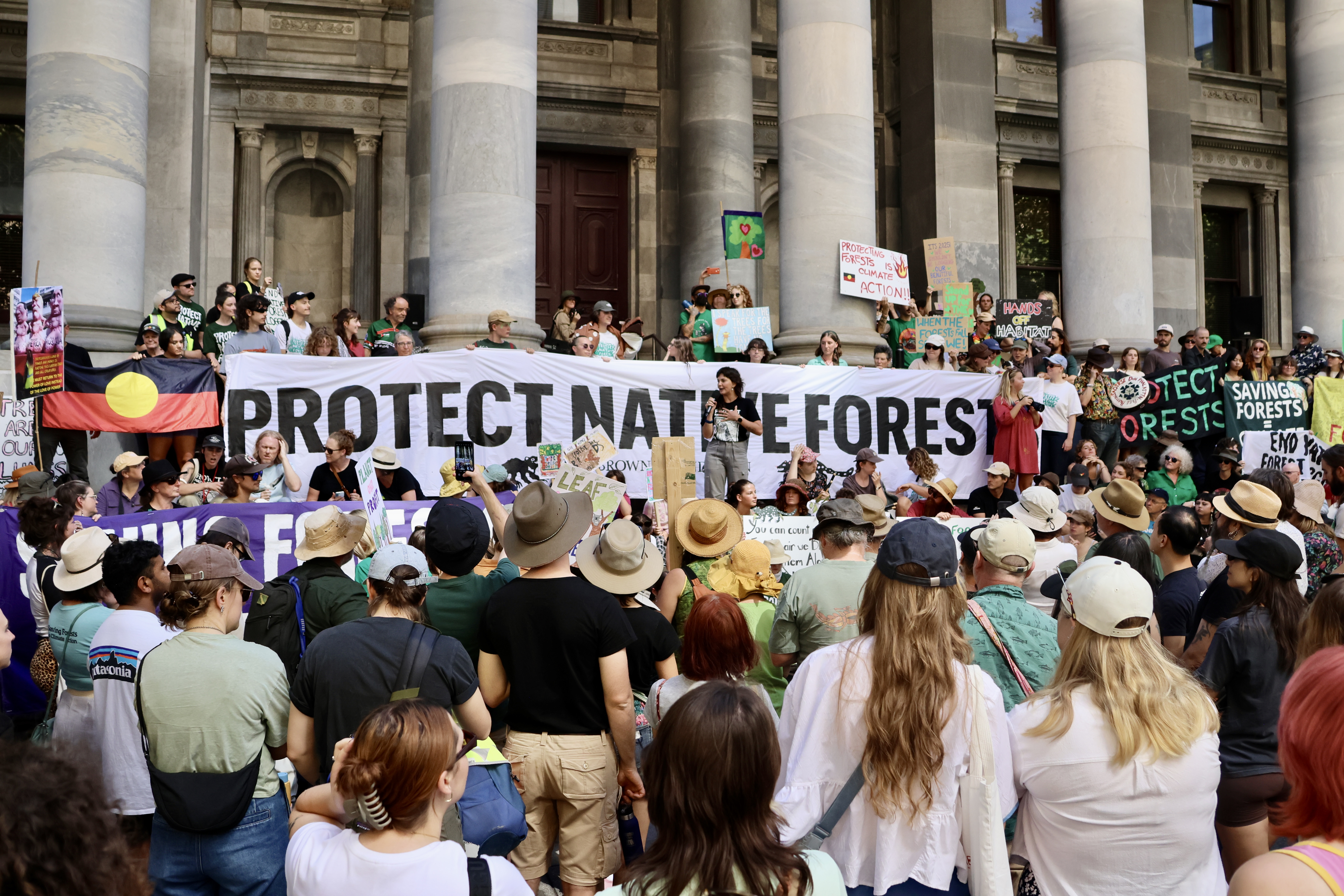
Adamson speaks at a 2025 protest rally outside Parliament House, calling for an end to native forest logging

Adamson supervised young people and taught science during the 2018 Garma Festival of Traditional Cultures' Yothu Yindi Youth Forum. Additionally, she participated in an Extinction Rebellion protest at Adelaide's Parliament House in April 2019 calling for immediate action on climate change. She went on to co-deliver programs such as the ASSETS and worked as a fisheries compliance support officer and sea ranger for Primary Industries and Regions SA (PIRSA), improving government agency connections to Indigenous peoples.

Incorporating First Nations wisdom ... it's not just something that would be great, it's something that's been cut out of leadership programs intentionally since colonisation and definitely something we need to bring back into conversations

— Tiahni Adamson, on regional leadership program (2023)

Since 2022, she has worked as the lead community engagement officer for CH4 Global, a climate technology company producing methane-reducing cattle feed from the native seaweed Asparagopsis. Adamson, as lead community engagement officer, is responsible for incorporating Indigenous knowledge into climate initiatives and conducting consultations to include community perspectives in decision-making.

Alongside her professional work, Adamson sits on the Green Adelaide Board, is a youth member of Uluru Statement from the Heart, and a member of Seed's leadership, Australia's only Indigenous-led youth climate justice organisation. Her activism includes science, politics, and Indigenous rights.

== Personal life ==
Adamson spends time with Aboriginal elders, where she listens, learns language and culture, and engages with traditional knowledge systems. She has described these experiences as grounding and humbling. In her personal time, she enjoys activities connected to the coast, including surfing, snorkelling, and swimming.

== Recognitions and awards ==
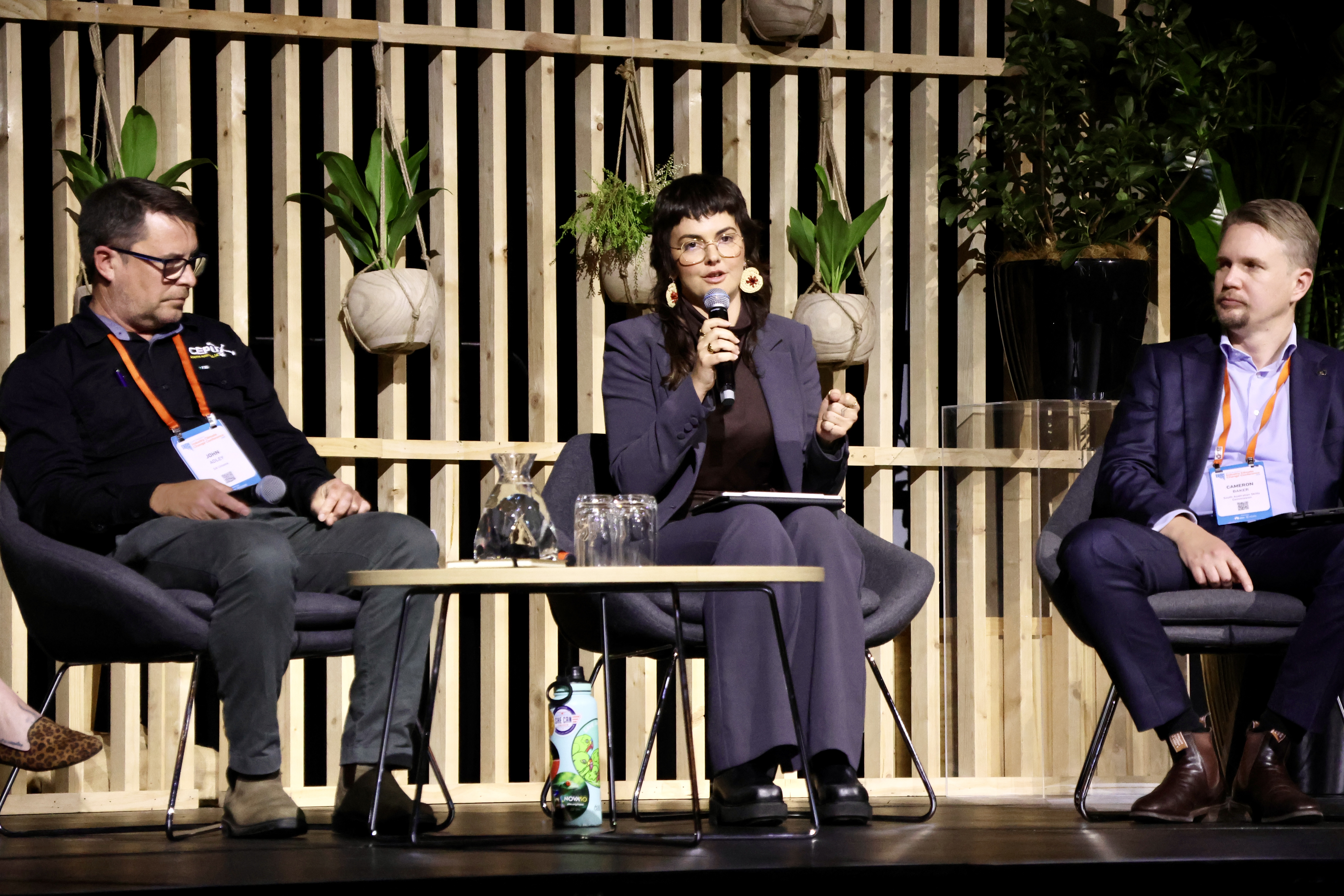
Adamson (middle) speaking at the South Australia's Industry Climate Change Conference 2025

Adamson is recognised for her work in environmental science, Indigenous community engagement, sustainability, and climate change. Her activism and research have been covered by CityMag, The Canberra Times, and Cosmos.

Adamson was a finalist for the Aboriginal and Torres Strait Islander Tertiary Student STEM Achievement Award at the 2018 Indigenous STEM Awards. She was part of the Indigenous STEM Education Project team that received the Aboriginal and Torres Strait Islander Engagement Impact Excellence Medal from CSIRO in 2020. She shared the first Leif Justham Young Achiever Award at the South Australian Environment Awards in 2021.

In 2022, Adamson was awarded the Tirkapena Indigenous Award from the University of Adelaide, acknowledging her contribution as an Aboriginal and Torres Strait Islander alumna and the Dr Kaye Price AM Award for STEM excellence. She was also listed among Science and Technology Australia's Superstars of STEM for developing emissions-cutting seaweed for animal feed and also for bringing Indigenous knowledge into environmental projects.

In 2023, Adamson was named in InDaily's South Australian 40 Under 40 as lead community engagement officer at CH4 Global, developing sustainable seaweed aquaculture to reduce methane emissions and Indigenous community programs. Adamson was named South Australia's Young Australian of the Year in 2024 and was a national Young Australian of the Year award finalist. She was also a finalist in the Aboriginal Achievement category for the 2024 7News Young Achiever Awards. Adamson was a finalist in the South Australian Women of Impact Awards for Impact in the Community and Aboriginal Impact in 2025.
