= Susannah Eliott =

Science communicator and evidence advocate

- Education: UTS, Stanford University
- Employer: Australian Science Media Centre
- Known for: Science Communication

Susannah Eliott is an Australian science communicator and evidence advocate. She is the CEO of the Australian Science Media Centre (AusSMC), and advocates for access to trusted information sources on science and technology.

== Education ==
Eliott was awarded a PhD from Macquarie University as well as a Graduate Diploma in Journalism from UTS. She was also awarded an honorary doctorate from the University of Adelaide for science communications.

Her PhD involved researching soil microorganisms, known as slime moulds. She worked at the UTS Centre for Science Communication within the 1990s.

In 2000 Eliott took up a position in Stockholm, Sweden, as the director of communications at IGBP, which is a global research organisation which covers environmental change. In 2005 Eliott moved to Australia and helped found the Australian Science Media Centre.

== Career ==
Eliott is a board member of the Environmental Institute at the University of Adelaide, as well as a judge for the Banksia Sustainability Awards. She has provided training on science communication and the media to institutions such as ANU, Her training often involves advice from journalists and experienced science communicators, on working in controversial fields, as well as navigating public engagement through media outlets.

Eliott is a mentor for the Superstars of STEM program, a judge on the Australian Museum Eureka Prize panel for Science Journalism, and also a member of the Inspiring South Australia Steering Group.

Eliott was also a member of the Climate Commission from 2011 to 2012, appointed together with Tim Flannery, Will Steffen, Lesley Hughes and others in 2011. The role of the Climate Commission, established by the Gillard government was to:

“...provide expert advice on climate change science and impacts, and international action. It will help build the consensus required to move to a clean energy future.”

She has commented in the media, on issues around bushfires and climate change. She also chaired the Expert Working Group on Science and the Media for the Australian Federal Government as part of the Inspiring Australia initiative.

== Media ==
Eliott has regularly appeared on the ABC Radio National's Drive program with Patricia Karvelas, discussing issues including climate change. She has commented in the media frequently regarding environmental advocates, including prizes for people who volunteer their time for community. Eliott has also commented on the need for quality media in The Lancet. She has commented on climate and extreme weather events, and the need for evidence-based reporting:

“Issues such as climate change and extreme weather are vitally important to Australia and it’s critical that we get clear and accurate information from our media outlets. Bringing scientists and journalists together to work collaboratively on these important topics will help all Australians get the information they need.”

Eliott also commented on the quality of information, on issues such as vaccines, climate change, extreme weather and pandemics:

“We are very concerned about the impact of this action on the quality of information reaching the public. Facebook is used by many non-news organisations to distribute evidence-based information to the public on critical issues such as vaccines, pandemics, climate change and extreme weather events. Social media platforms have a responsibility to enable the sharing of accurate information on these key topics and not increase the prominence of misinformation.”

== Awards ==
- 2023 - Fellow of the Australian Academy of Technlological Sciences and Engineering.
- 2016 - Honorary doctorate from the University of Adelaide.
