= Celine Frere =

Australian biologist and researcher

- Born: Geneva, Switzerland
- Education: University of Queensland; University of New South Wales
- Scientific career
- Fields: Conservation, Ecology, Evolutionary Biology

Celine Frere is a Swiss evolutionary biologist. In 2017, she was named one of Australia's first Superstars of STEM by Science & Technology Australia. She is known for co-founding USC's Detection Dogs for Conservation initiative, training sniffer dogs to aid in research and conversation efforts around endangered and protected species.

== Early life and education ==
Frere was born and raised outside of Geneva, Switzerland. After graduating high school in 1999, she moved to Australia to attend university. In 2002, she received a Bachelor of Science degree in Zoology from the University of Queensland, where she studied humpback dolphins for her undergraduate research. She then pursued her graduate education in evolutionary biology at the University of New South Wales, where she joined the Shark Bay Dolphin Project, working to understand how social and genetic factors affect dolphins' ability to survive and reproduce. She began her postdoctoral work in 2009 at the University of Queensland, transitioning from studying dolphins to studying koalas as they were undergoing a dramatic decline in their population. Her research focused on using koala poop to track and trace the animals, which became the basis for her subsequent research.

== Career ==
Frere became a research fellow at the University of the Sunshine Coast where she began her program of training dogs to follow the scent trail of koala poop to track where koalas were living and patters of habitation. She and her research group tested a detection dog called Maya trained by professional dog trainer Gary Jackson to smell koala scat, demonstrating that this method was more efficient and accurate than other scat surveying methods. The method served as the basis for USC's Detection Dogs for Conservation, which she co-founded with colleague Romane Critescu. The program is dedicated to promoting the use of detection dogs in environmental conservation efforts. The program has since trained three dogs, including a dog called Bear, who found and rescued over 100 koalas affected by the 2020 bushfires.

== Awards and honours ==
- Superstar of STEM, Science & Technology Australia, 2017
- Young Tall Poppy Science Award, Australian Institute of Policy and Science, 2020
