= Sara Webb (astrophysicist) =

Astrophysicist and science communicator

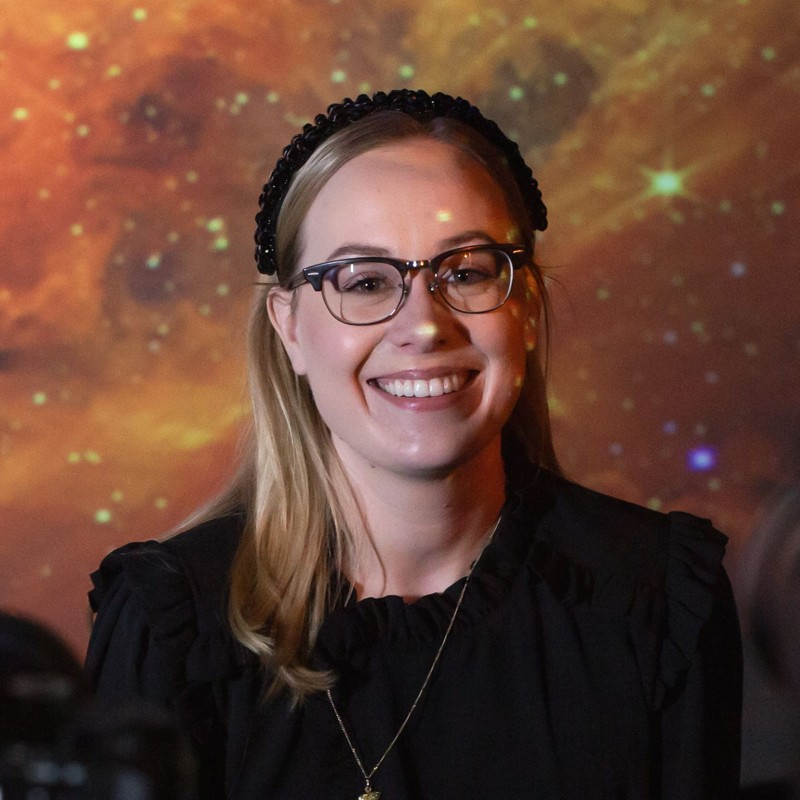
- Webb in front of nebula background
- Education: Swinburne University of Technology
- Occupations: Astrophysicist and author
- Employer: Swinburne University of Technology
- Known for: Astrophysics, Science Communication, author
- Website: https://www.sarawebbscience.com/

Sara A. Webb is an Australian astrophysicist, science communicator and author, best known for her work on of astronomy, space-based experimentation, and public engagement. In 2025, she was recognised on the Forbes Asia 30 Under 30 List in Healthcare and Science as the only Australian academic selected. She was previously named a Superstar of STEM (Science and Technology Australia) in 2023. Webb is a Lecturer and Course Director at Swinburne University of Technology, where she leads student-driven space programs and contributes to interdisciplinary research spanning astrophysics and microgravity science.

== Education ==
Sara A. Webb earned her Bachelor of Science at Queensland University of Technology, majoring in physics with minors in astrophysics and computational mathematics. She undertook early research projects on star formation in galaxies..

For her honours year, Webb focused on astrophysics through a joint research project with the Australian Astronomical Observatory, simulating supernova explosions and observing distant galaxies with Australia's largest optical telescope.

Webb joined Swinburne University of Technology in Australia as a PhD candidate in 2018, which she completed in 2021. Her PhD helped shape the Deeper, Wider, Faster transient astronomy programme, with a thesis centred on the universe's fastest transient events and one of the first applications of unsupervised machine learning to complex astronomical timeseries data.

Webb held postdoctoral roles at Swinburne, including interdisciplinary research applying machine-learning techniques to decision-support systems in partnership with national research teams. During this period, she also became Mission Director for the Swinburne Youth Space Innovation Challenge, overseeing student-designed experiments destined for the International Space Station. Her research focuses on using artificial intelligence and machine learning to analyse large and complex astrophysical data sets, such as identifying sources of gravitational waves and fast radio bursts. Her early work in machine learning for anomalous source detection allowed her to discover a sub-population of ulta fast flares on M-dwarf stars within the Milky Way.

== Career ==
In mid-2024, Webb became Course Director at Swinburne University of Technology, where she leads Swinburne Astronomy Online, directs microgravity experimentation initiatives within the Space Technology Industry Institute, and continues her research at the intersection of astrophysics, artificial intelligence, and space science.

Webb has appeared as an expert correspondent to discuss space and astronomy in radio, TV and print media. Her articles have appeared in The Conversation, COSMOS and BBC Science Focus, and been including in the Australian Anthology Best in Science Writing. Her debut book "The Little Book of Cosmic Catastrophes" was released in October 2024.

== Awards ==
- 2018, Swinburne, Venture Cup Winner, Swinburne University of Technology
- 2022, Swinburne, Vice-Chancellor's Research Excellence Award (Early Career), Swinburne University of Technology
- 2022, Swinburne, Vice-Chancellor's Empowered Award, Swinburne University of Technology
- 2022, National Superstar of STEM, Science and Technology Australia.
- 2023, International, Runner-up Women in AI (Defence), Women in AI – Asia Pacific.
- 2023, Women in AI scholarship, DAIRNet.
- 2024, Rising Star of the Year – Enterprise, Australian Space Awards
- 2024, David Allen prize from the Astronomical Society of Australia.
- 2024, Swinburne Media Excellence, multiple awards.
- 2025, Forbes Asia, 30 Under 30 in Science and Healthcare.
- 2025, AmCham, Ambassadors Award
