= Australian Science Media Centre =

Australian science news media service

The Australian Science Media Centre (AusSMC) is an independent, not-for-profit service for the news media based in Adelaide, South Australia. Established in 2005, the centre gives journalists direct access to evidence-based science and expertise.

== History ==
South Australian Premier Mike Rann established the Australian Science Media Centre in 2005 following a recommendation from Adelaide Thinker in Residence Baroness Susan Greenfield. For 15 years, it was housed in the old Adelaide Stock Exchange building in Adelaide city

In 2025 the AusSMC moved to Lot Fourteen.

== Function and description ==
The centre's aim is to better inform public debate on the major issues of the day by improving links between local and international media and the Australian scientific community. The centre operates a database of scientists who are willing to engage with the media.

The AusSMC collects expert comments from scientists in reaction to breaking news, and also runs national media briefings for journalists. Media briefings are also streamed live over the Internet to journalists. Journalists are able to register with the AusSMC to receive media alerts and expert reactions by email, and to get access to embargoed science news via the science news portal it administers, Scimex. The centre also collaborates with media officers and scientists and has an increasing role in combating misinformation.

== Governance and staffing ==
The AusSMC is governed by a board of management. Peter Yates AM is its inaugural chairman.

The centre's "Statement of Independence" includes the following passage:

"All board members acknowledge that Centre staff are free to disseminate the best available scientific information, regardless of any commercial, political or personal interests, including those of any sponsors or board members. Full editorial control of all material disseminated by the SMC rests with the staff of the SMC, with guidance sought from the Centre's Science and Media Advisory Panel (SMAP) when required."

As of 2025 AusSMC operates with six full-time and four part-time staff and is headed by CEO Susannah Eliott.

== Supporters ==
The AusSMC receives funding from several tiers of supporters and partners. Each supporter's contribution is capped at 10% of the centre's operating costs. As of May 2025 Foundation partners are: ABC, CSIRO, Government of South Australia, New South Wales Government, News Corp Australia, University of Melbourne, University of New South Wales, Flinders University, AIA, Squiz, University of Queensland, University of Technology Sydney, Curtin University, Springer Nature, and Nine Entertainment.

In December 2024, the AusSMC was endorsed as a deductible gift recipient (DGR) meaning all donations from members of the public in Australia are now tax deductible.

== Other SMCs ==
As of 2025 there are six other international independent SMCs: Science Media Centre in the UK; the Science Media Centre of Canada; and centres in New Zealand, Germany, Taiwan, and Spain.
