= Muireann Irish =

Cognitive neuropsychologist and researcher

Muireann Irish FASSA FRSN
- Born: Ireland
- Education: Trinity College Dublin (BS); Trinity College Dublin (PhD)
- Scientific career
- Workplaces: University of Sydney

Muireann Irish is a cognitive neuropsychologist at the Brain and Mind Centre at the University of Sydney. She has won international and national awards, including an Australian Research Council Future Fellowship and L’Oreal-UNESCO For Women in Science Fellowship.

== Career ==
Irish works on dementia and says she is "interested in how we remember the past and imagine the future". Her career has explored how memory and imagination are changed during neurological conditions including Alzheimer's disease.

Irish has given science communication talks on the importance of day dreaming.

=== Diversity in science ===
Irish has advocated for diversity in science on many platforms, and she is committed to the promotion and retention of women in science. She was named as one of the inaugural 30 Superstars of STEM in 2018, as part of a growing movement with the goal of providing positive role models to young girls and minorities to pursue a career in science.

Irish is one of a growing number of academic women in STEM who are committed to retaining women in science.

== Awards ==
Irish has received a number of international awards.

- 2020 – The Gottschalk Medal is awarded by the Australian Academy of Science
- 2019 – Young Investigator Award, from the Cognitive Neuroscience Agency
- 2019 – British Neuropsychological Society – Elizabeth Warrington Prize.
- 2017 – L’Oréal–UNESCO International Rising Talent Award.
- 2017 – Superstars of STEMM.
- 2016–2020 – ARC Future Fellow.
- 2016 – NSW Premier's Prize – Early Career Researcher of the Year
- 2015 – L’Oreal–UNESCO For Women in Science Fellowship.
- 2014 – NSW Young Tall Poppy Science Award.
- 2013 – Laird Cermak Award for Outstanding Research in Memory presented by the International Neuropsychological Society.

Irish is a Fellow of the Royal Society of New South Wales (FRSN) and was elected a Fellow of the Academy of the Social Sciences in Australia in 2023.

== Select publications ==
- Irish, Muireann; Bunk, Steffie; Tu, Sicong; Kamminga, Jody; Hodges, John R.; Hornberger, Michael; Piguet, Olivier (2016). "Preservation of episodic memory in semantic dementia: The importance of regions beyond the medial temporal lobes" (PDF). Neuropsychologia. 81: 50–60. doi:10.1016/j.neuropsychologia.2015.12.005. PMID 26683384. S2CID 220988.
- Piguet, Olivier; Hodges, John R.; Addis, Donna Rose; Irish, Muireann (1 July 2012). "Considering the role of semantic memory in episodic future thinking: evidence from semantic dementia" (PDF). Brain. 135 (7): 2178–2191. doi:10.1093/brain/aws119. hdl:1959.4/unsworks_12991. PMID 22614246.

== Media ==
- Irish's work has been described on The Conversation.
- Her work provided insight into why time flies as one gets older and why we day dream.
- The ABC described the neuroscience work conducted by her and her team.
- Dementia Australia described her work on dementia.
- Her career path was described in Careers with STEM.
