= Parwinder Kaur =

Indian biotechnologist

The Honourable Parwinder Kaur MLC
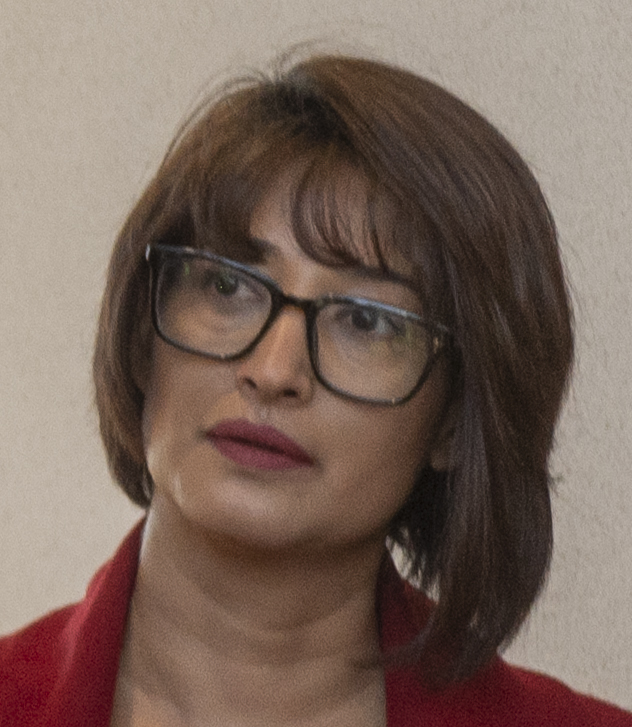
- Kaur in 2025

Member of the Western Australian Legislative Council
- Incumbent
- Assumed office 22 May 2025
- Premier: Roger Cook
- Preceded by: Sally Talbot

Personal details
- Born: Punjab, India
- Citizenship: Australia
- Party: Labor
- Education: Punjab Agricultural University (BSc), University of Western Australia (PhD)
- Profession: Research scientist, associate professor (biotechnology),

Parwinder Kaur
- Education: University of Western Australia
- Employer: University of Western Australia
- Known for: Biodiversity and science
- Title: Associate Professor
- Scientific career
- Thesis: Pathogenic behaviour of Albugo candida on Brassica juncea and mechanisms of host resistance (2010)

Parwinder Kaur is an Australian biotechnologist and politician. She was elected to the Western Australian Parliament as a Member of the Legislative Council of the at the 2025 state election for the Labor Party. Prior to entering politics she was director of the DNA Zoo Australia, and associate professor at the University of Western Australia. Her research involves genomic techniques to help conservation efforts. On International Women's Day in 2023, Kaur was inducted into the WA Women's Hall of Fame.

== Early life and education ==
Parwinder Kaur spent her early life in Nawanshahr, Punjab.

She obtained her undergraduate degree in agriculture from the Punjab Agricultural University, subsequently completing her masters degree in entomology. She obtained an international scholarship to pursue a PhD at University of Western Australia (UWA) with a focus on molecular biology, genomics, and biotechnology.

She received a PhD from UWA in 2010 for her thesis, "Pathogenic behaviour of Albugo candida on Brassica juncea and mechanisms of host resistance".

She said that her "biggest challenge was convincing family and community that female education and pursuing a career is of value, and a better investment than the traditional route of dowry and marriage", and that winning a PhD scholarship at the right time was a way to escape this, and move to Australia to follow her research interests.

== Career ==
Kaur is a biotechnologist who has spent more than a decade researching genomic methodologies, including cross-disciplinary biodiversity genomic research, as well as conservation biology and genomics, to help conservation efforts for threatened and endangered species. Her research aims to use genomic technologies to investigate biodiversity and natural environments, with the goal of working towards sustainable futures. Her research has also used AI, in biodiversity and genomic innovation.

She was director of the DNA Zoo Australia, and associate professor at UWA. On International Women's Day in 2023, Kaur was inducted into the WA Women's Hall of Fame.

She is also an entrepreneur in the biotechnology sector, with a company called Ex Planta Pty Ltd combining technology with bio-engineering solutions.

== Other activities ==
Kaur is also an ambassador for GirlsXTech.

She was appointed to be on a Diversity in STEM expert panel within the office of the Minister for Industry and Science, Australia, being appointed by Hon. Ed Husic, MP.

Kaur has written for The Conversation on Avian Flu, and how migrating birds can bring the virus to Australian birds. She wrote that preparation including understanding ways of detecting and tracking outbreaks of viruses in wildlife is necessary to protect against viral outbreaks crossing from wildlife to humans.

Kaur has been in the media for her work, increasing the participation of women and boosting diversity in STEM subjects.

== Recognition ==
- 2013: Science and Innovation Award, Australian Academy of Science
- 2019–2020: Microsoft's AI for Earth award
- 2021–2022: Superstar of STEM, Science & Technology Australia
- 2023: Finalist, Agenda Setter of the Year, Women's Agenda Leadership Awards
- 2023: Australian Sikh Woman of the Year
- 2023: WA Women's Hall of Fame, on International Women's Day on for her contributions to science and diversity
- 2026: Fellow, Australian Academy of Technological Sciences & Engineering

== Politics ==
Kaur is affiliated with the Shop, Distributive and Allied Employees Association (SDA) which is aligned with the Progressive Labor (Labor right) faction.

She was elected to the Western Australian Parliament as a Member of the Legislative Council of the at the 2025 state election for WA Labor, with the new Legislative Council being sworn in on 22 May 2025.

== Personal life ==
Kaur is married with two children. She has spoken publicly about her Sikh faith.
