= Eileen Hofmann =

Marine scientist

Eileen Elizabeth Hofmann
- Education: North Carolina State University
- Scientific career
- Thesis: Analysis and modelling of a bottom intrusion in Onslow Bay, North Carolina (1980)

Eileen E. Hofmann is a professor and eminent scholar at Old Dominion University who is known for her research linking biological and physical interactions in marine systems. In 2013, Hofmann was elected a fellow of the American Geophysical Union who cited her "for her pioneering work in modeling physical-biological interactions".

== Education and career ==
Hofmann has a B.S. from Chestnut Hill College (1974), an M.S. (1976) and a Ph.D.(1980) from North Carolina State University. Following her Ph.D., Hofmann was a postdoctoral scientist at Florida State University and North Carolina State University before she moved to Old Dominion University in 1989.

From 2017 until 2019, Hofmann served as the president of the Ocean Sciences section of the American Geophysical Union. Hofmann is co-Editor-in-Chief for the Journal of Marine Systems

== Research ==
Hofmann is known for her research using models to link biological and physical interactions in marine systems. She has used models to define the movement of water masses in the global ocean, to examine the flux of nutrients on the continental shelf, and to characterize the life history of Antarctic krill. Hofmann has examined how predation in marine systems is connected to environmental change and fisheries. Her research includes work on the disease in Eastern oysters caused by Perkinsus marinus, and she co-led a special issue focused on marine disease in Philosophical Transactions of the Royal Society. Hofmann coordinated the United States and international field work as part of the Global Ocean Ecosystem Dynamics (GLOBEC) project.

=== Selected publications ===
- Hofmann, Eileen E.; Klinck, John M.; Lascara, Cathy M.; Smith, David A. (1996). "Water mass distribution and circulation west of the Antarctic Peninsula and including Bransfield Strait". Foundations for Ecological Research West of the Antarctic Peninsula. Antarctic Research Series. Vol. 70. American Geophysical Union. pp. 61–80. doi:10.1029/ar070p0061 (inactive 1 July 2025). ISBN 0-87590-891-8.
- Hofmann, Eileen E.; Klinck, John M.; Locarnini, Ricardo A.; Fach, Bettina; Murphy, Eugene (December 1998). "Krill transport in the Scotia Sea and environs" (PDF). Antarctic Science. 10 (4): 406–415. Bibcode:1998AntSc..10..406H. doi:10.1017/S0954102098000492. hdl:11511/31245. S2CID 36448268.
- Harvell, C. D. (1999-09-03). "Emerging Marine Diseases--Climate Links and Anthropogenic Factors". Science. 285 (5433): 1505–1510. doi:10.1126/science.285.5433.1505. PMID 10498537.
- Prézelin, Barbara B.; Hofmann, Eileen E.; Mengelt, Claudia; Klinck, John M. (1 March 2000). "The linkage between Upper Circumpolar Deep Water (UCDW) and phytoplankton assemblages on the west Antarctic Peninsula continental shelf". Journal of Marine Research. 58 (2): 165–202. doi:10.1357/002224000321511133.
- Fraser, WR; Hofmann, EE (2003). "A predator's perspective on causal links between climate change, physical forcing and ecosystem response". Marine Ecology Progress Series. 265: 1–15. Bibcode:2003MEPS..265....1F. doi:10.3354/meps265001.

== Awards and honors ==
- Fellow, American Geophysical Union (2013)
