= Caroline Ford (historian) =

American historian

- Born: Baghdad, Iraq
- Spouse: Sanjay Subrahmanyam

Academic background
- Education: B.A., 1977, Duke University; MA., PhD., Modern European History, 1987, University of Chicago
- Thesis: Religion and rural politics in France: social Catholicism in lower Brittany, 1890-1926 (1987)

Academic work
- Discipline: French history
- Institutions: University of Chicago; Harvard University; University of British Columbia; University of California, Los Angeles

Caroline Cole Ford is an American historian. She is a Professor of History at the University of California, Los Angeles.

== Early life and education ==
Ford was born in Baghdad, Iraq but raised in Europe. She earned her Bachelor of Arts from Duke University and her PhD in modern European history from the University of Chicago.

== Career ==
After earning her PhD, Ford taught at Harvard University from 1988 until 1995. While there, she published her first book titled "Creating the Nation in Provincial France: Religion and Political Identity in Brittany" through the Princeton University Press. It was published in French in 2018 as De la province à la nation: religion et identité politique en Bretagne by Presses Universitaires de Rennes. The book focused on the relationship between French nationality and religious institutions. She then became an associate professor at the University of British Columbia (UBC) in 1995. During her tenure, she was the recipient of the Izaac Walton Killam Memorial Fellowship and named a Distinguished Junior Scholar.

Ford eventually left UBC in 2004 to join the faculty of history at the University of California, Los Angeles (UCLA). She also published her second book titled "Divided Houses: Religion and Gender in Modern France" through the Cornell University Press in 2005, which focused on the impact of gender on religion and politics in France.

As a professor at UCLA, her article “Reforestation, Landscape Conservation, and the Anxieties of Empire in French Colonial Algeria,” received the 2008 William Koren Jr. Prize from the Society for French Historical Studies for the best article on French history published by a North American scholar. In 2011, Ford and her husband Sanjay Subrahmanyam were elected Guggenheim Fellows which allowed her to research in Europe.

In May 2016, Ford received a Luskin Institute on Inequality and Democracy grant to conduct research on "The Paris Housing Crisis and the Campaign for Affordable Housing, 1894-1940". Later that year, she published her third book titled "Natural Interests: The Contest over Environment in Modern France," which explores French environmental consciousness in the 18th and 19th centuries. It was published in French in 2018 as Naissance de l'écologie: polémiques françaises sur l'environnement, 1900-1930 by Alma. In the same year (2018) her first book was published in French by the Presses Universitaires de Rennes as De la province à la nation: religion et identité en Bretagne. Also in 2018, she was appointed the Peter H. Reill Endowed Chair in European History (1450 to Modern) for a three year term.
