= Sue Barrell =

Meteorologist and scientist

Sue Barrell AO FTSE
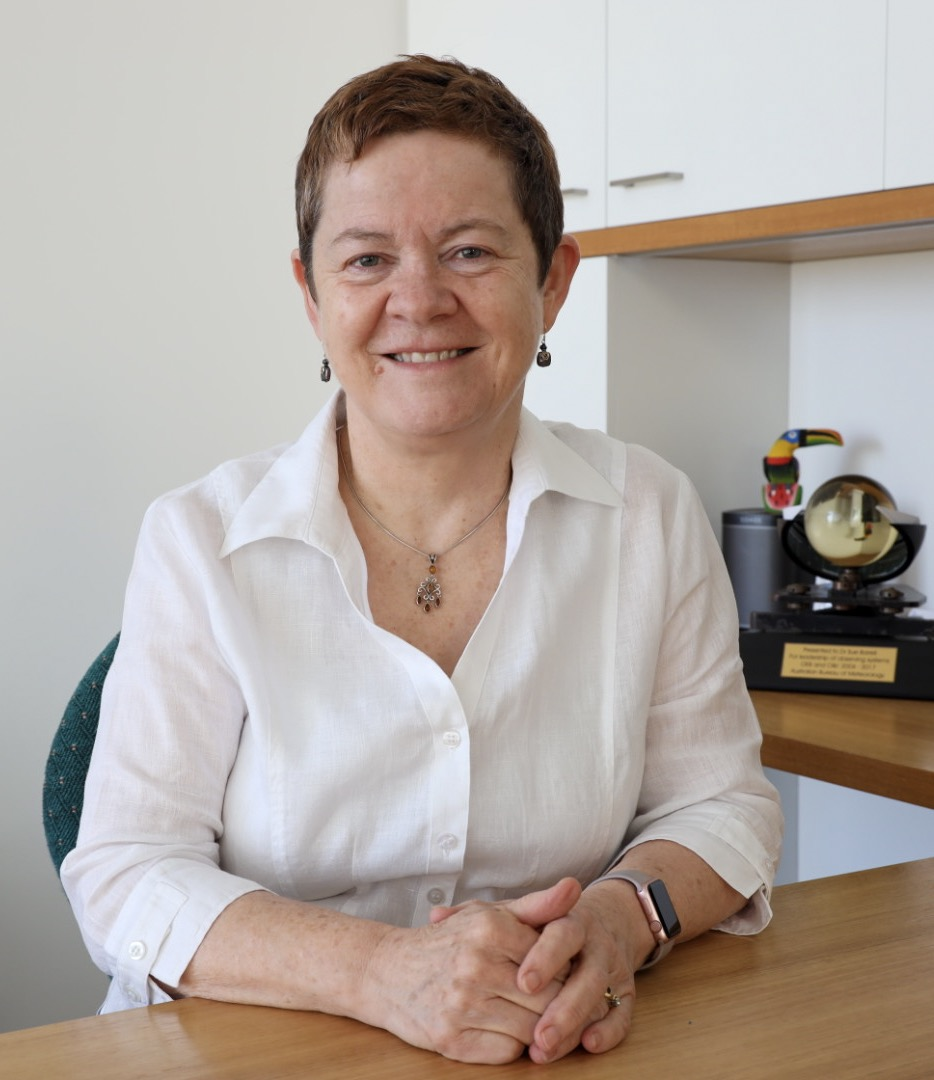
- Sue Barrell in 2019
- Education: University of Canterbury (BSc); ANU (PhD)
- Scientific career
- Workplaces: Honorary at Bureau of Meteorology

Sue Barrell AO FTSE was chief scientist at the Bureau of Meteorology (BoM). In 2013 she was awarded a Fellow of the Academy of Technology and Engineering (FTSE). In 2018, Barrell was elected Vice President of Science and Technology Australia. Amongst other topics, she has worked on international science policy climate monitoring, research and policy, and ocean–earth observations. Barrell was the first female meteorologist to join the senior Executive team of the BoM. She was the first female elected to leadership of a WMO Technical Commission (vice-president, Commission for Basic Systems) and was one of the early female forecasters.

== Career ==
Barrell was vice-president of the World Meteorological Organization (WMO) Commission for Basic Systems. In addition Barrell served as a member on the Australian Space Industry Innovation Council. Further, she was the principal delegate for Australia to the Group on Earth Observations (GEO).

Although retired, she continues to be actively engaged as an invited speaker, in the WMO and its executive council and through the WMO Commission on Basic Systems, coordinating earth observations.

== Diversity in science ==
Barrell has spent much of her career supporting women in STEMM, and describing her career experiences in order to be a role model for younger scientists. Barrell has encouraged younger women scientists to take up a career in meteorology, as for women as it offers many opportunities, "and can take you around the world". During her work for Women in Science, she said "there was never any doubt that a career in science was for her". She has completed numerous engagements, encouraging younger scientists and advocating for diversity in science.

"We need to get everyone – boys and girls – on a level playing field when it comes to STEMM and build their confidence."

== Awards ==
- 2013 – Fellow of the Australian Academy of Technology and Engineering
- 2016–17 – Permanent Representative for Australia with the WMO in addition to being a member of executive council.
- 2017–18 – Inaugural STA Superstar of STEM.
- 2022 – Officer of the Order of Australia for "distinguished service to earth science through meteorology and research organisations".
- 2022 - International Meteorological Organization Prize

== Early life ==
Barrell was born in England, 1953, and moved to New Zealand at the age of four. She went to a public girls school where she was encouraged that she could "do anything". The school had a well-organised science program and encouraging teachers, which inspired her passion for science.

== Media ==
Barrell's work on meteorology and gender equity in STEM has been described in the following media articles:

- Her work opening the first Observing Operations Hub in Darwin, was described by the media.
- She opened a platform for global information on weather, climate and environmental data to allow sharing through the United Nations Meteorological Organisation (WMO).
- Her equality in STEMM work has been described by the BoM media.
- Her career has been profiled by the Women in STEMM Australia program.
- She led the National Science Week feature on Radio National in 2018.
- Barrell was the key note speaker at the Academy of Science Shine Annual Symposium.
