= Sarah Pearce (astronomer) =

- Occupation: Astronomer
- Employer: CSIRO
- Known for: Director of World's largest telescope
- Title: Dr

Sarah Elizabeth Pearce is an astronomer and space technologist, the director of the Australian component of the Square Kilometre Array (SKA) telescope, a fellow of the Australian Academy of Technological Sciences and Engineering.

== Education and early life ==
Pearce has wanted to work in space since she was a teenager, and remembers where she was, while watching the NASA Curiosity Rover landing on Mars, which influenced her early career.

She was interested astronomy at school, and in answering big questions,

'like how is the universe formed, and what are we made of'.

Pearce has an undergraduate degree in Physics from Worcester College at the University of Oxford and a PhD from the University of Leicester in X-ray astronomy submitted in October 1997.

== Career ==
Pearce's career has included being a project manager of UK computing for particle science, Deputy Director of CSIRO, Space and Astronomy. She was also the Acting CSIRO Chief Scientist, as well as science advisor for the Parliament of the UK. She has led a team who delivered computing for the Large Hadron Collider particle accelerator in Switzerland.

Pearce led a team of over 250 people at CSIRO as the Deputy Director of Astronomy and Space Science. She led CSIRO's engagement with the SKA internationally and was Australia's science representative on the negotiating team for the SKA Observatory Treaty.

When Cathy Foley took the position of Australia's Chief Scientist, Pearce took the role of leading the Science Impact and Policy team at CSIRO. She also ran the CSIRO division of astronomy and space science responsible for the 'Dish' at Parkes, as well as the SKA (Square Kilometer Array) pathfinder in Western Australia.

In July 2021 she became the first Director of the SKA Observatory's low frequency telescope in Australia.

The SKA telescope is a low frequency telescope, using low-frequency radio, and 'promises a first look at the universe'. Pearce described the work and its applications:

""A project like this is going to need some serious computing power. SKA will have to deal with seven terrabytes of data a second, like analysing 100,000 home broadband connections constantly. That's an enormous data challenge.... And so we hope this will teach us not only how to deal with astronomy data, but ways it can be applied to other large-scale data projects, whether in science or industry."

Pearce has been a judge of the Three Minute Thesis award, where PhD candidates describe their PhD to an audience in lay terms.

In 2025, the first images from the SKA observatory were released, using only 1,000 of the planned 131,000 antennas. Pearce commented that 'The bright galaxies we can see are just the tip of the iceberg... The team has achieved stellar results'.

== Publications ==
Pearce has a number of publications describing the Australian SKA and publications on particle physics.

== Awards ==
- 2019 – Superstar of STEM
- 2020 – Telstra NSW Business Woman of the Year
- 2020 – Australian Space Executive of the Year
- 2020 – Chief Executive Team CSIRO award
- 2020 – Fellow of the Australian Academy of Technological Sciences and Engineering
- 2024 - Outstanding Senior Leadership Award of the Women in Technology WA Inc.
