= Caroline Ford (medical researcher) =

Australian scientist and gynaecological cancer researcher

- Education: University of New South Wales (Ph.D.)
- Known for: STEMMinist Bookclub
- Scientific career
- Fields: Cancer research
- Workplaces: University of New South Wales

Caroline E. Ford is an Australian scientist at the University of New South Wales and advocate for women in science. Her research aims to understand why gynaecological cancers develop, how they spread and how best to treat them, and she leads the Gynaecological Cancer Research Group at the University of New South Wales, which was established in 2010.

== Education ==
Ford completed her Ph.D. at the University of New South Wales in oncogenic viruses, particularly related to breast cancer. She also has completed a Graduate Certificate in University Learning & Teaching. She completed her first postdoctoral research appointment at the University of Toronto and her second position was at Lund University where she investigated mouse mammary tumor virus (MMTV) sequences in breast tumour samples from women and men.

== Career ==
Late in 2009, she came back to work at her alma mater, the University of New South Wales. Ford leads the Gynaecological Cancer Research Group at the University of New South Wales. Her team has a particular focus in the Wnt signalling pathway, which is involved in cancer metastasis, the role of ROR1 and ROR2 receptor molecules in spreading cancer, and how they can be blocked to stop metastasis.

Ford convened Australia's first massive open online course (MOOC) on personalised medicine.

=== STEMMinist Bookclub ===
Ford started the global STEMMinist Bookclub in early 2018, bringing together three of her great loves — science, feminism and reading. This has evolved into a bimonthly bookclub and forum for discussing feminism, inclusion and diversity in STEMM. Since its establishment it had 4,000 members from 25 different countries in 2018, with online discussions on Twitter. Members meet up physically in cities around the world, including Sydney, New York, Atlanta, Dublin, Istanbul, Montreal, Vancouver, Cambridge and Oxford (often in a pub). Ford was interviewed about the STEMMinist Bookclub by Jane Caro and Catherine Fox for an episode of their Women With Clout podcast in July 2019.

== Recognition and awards ==
- 2003: Fresh Science award, for young Australian scientists whose published, peer-reviewed research had not been featured in the news, and who demonstrated a strong ability to explain their work
- 2003: A national Australian award "for her ability to communicate her results to the public in an engaging, easily understood manner", leading to media attention from around the world on her Ph.D. results about viruses causing breast cancer
- 2017: Selected as an inaugural Superstar of STEM, a program delivered through Science and Technology Australia, to increase the public visibility of women in STEM
- 2018: Women's Agenda Leadership Award in Science, Medicine, and Health
- 2018: Recognised as a leading Australian in the field of ovarian cancer research by the Witchery White Shirt Campaign The campaign has raised $12m Australian dollars to fund ovarian cancer research.

== Selected works ==
=== Journal articles ===
- Vogel, W. F.; Tsao, M. S.; T. Andersson; Zhu, C. Q.; Lau, S. K.; Ford, C. E. (2007). "Expression and mutation analysis of the discoidin domain receptors 1 and 2 in non-small cell lung carcinoma". British Journal of Cancer. 96 (5): 808–814. doi:10.1038/sj.bjc.6603614. ISSN 1532-1827. PMC 2360060. PMID 17299390.
- Vogel, W.F.; Abdulhussein, R.; Ford, C.E. (2006). "Sensing extracellular matrix: An update on discoidin domain receptor function". Cellular Signalling. 18 (8): 1108–1116. doi:10.1016/j.cellsig.2006.02.012. ISSN 0898-6568. PMID 16626936.
- Lawson, J.S.; Rawlinson, W.D.; Ta, V.T.; Deng, Y.; Tran, D.; Ford, C.E. (1 March 2003). "Mouse Mammary Tumor Virus-like Gene Sequences in Breast Tumors of Australian and Vietnamese Women". Clinical Cancer Research. 9 (3): 1118–1120. ISSN 1078-0432. PMID 12631616.pdf
