= Superstars of STEM =

Superstars of STEM is a program run by Science & Technology Australia designed to provide role models for women and non-binary people in STEM. It smashes gender stereotypes about who can participate in science, technology, engineering and maths (STEM). It was established in 2017 to provide media and science communications training.

== Program ==
Superstars of STEM aims to extend its impact beyond the program participants to benefit young women and girls, providing positive female role models in STEM. It acknowledges that a diversity of people in STEM leads to the best outcomes for society.

The program requires participants to attend school visits, participate in print media, blogs, public talks, radio and television interviews. In the 2022 evaluation of the program, Superstars of STEM had achieved between 2017–2026:

- 103,685 Australian students reached
- 961 school visits
- 9,700+ media mentions
- 16 million people reached through traditional media
- 69,000 hits on social media

== Selection process ==
Superstars of STEM participants are selected through a competitive process. Selection has focused on STEM professionals with expertise in their fields and an interest in communicating with public audiences. Each cohort now includes 60 participants and runs for two years.

Universities and research organisations have subsequently highlighted their staff members' selection for the program, including CSIRO, the University of Sydney and UNSW.

== Notable participants ==
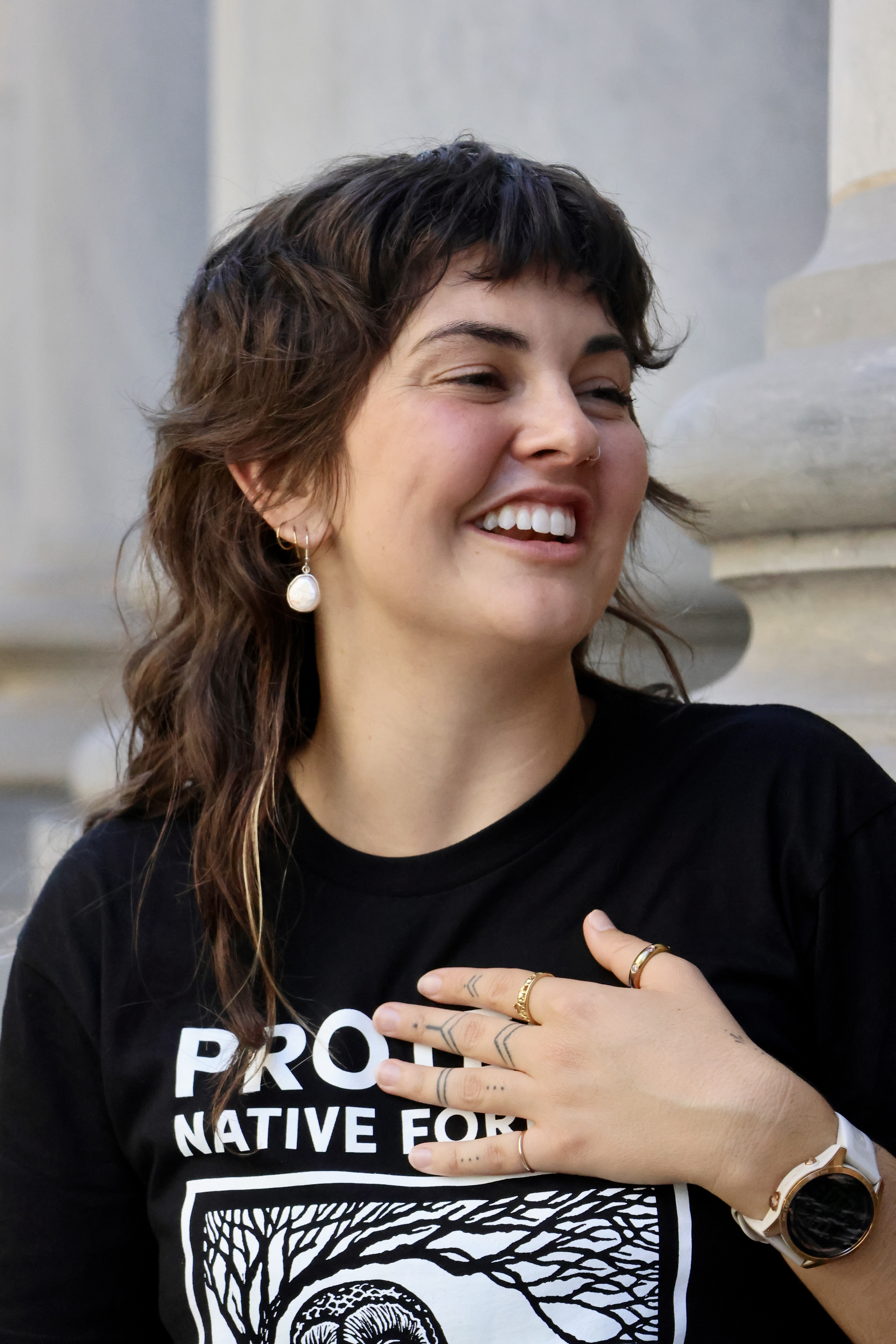
Superstar of STEM Tiahni Adamson at the Nationwide March in March for Forests, Adelaide 2025.

Superstars of STEM from previous cohorts, who have made a significant presence in the media and impact with their science include:

- Sara Webb, astronomer
- Vanessa Pirotta, wildlife scientist
- Tiahni Adamson, Young South Australian of the Year 2024
- Muireann Irish, cognitive neuroscientist
- Parwinder Kaur, biotechnologist
- Caroline Ford, medical researcher
- Jessica Melbourne-Thomas, marine ecologist
- Celine Frere, evolutionary biologist
- Kate Cole, engineer
- Sue Barrell, meteorologist
- Sarah Pearce, astronomer

Superstars of STEM have gone on to be elected Fellows of the Australian Academy of Technological Science and Engineering (such as Sarah Pearce FTSE) and the Academy of Social Sciences in Australia (including Muireann Irish FASSA), or appointed Officer of the Order of Australia (see Sue Barrell AO).

== Selected media coverage ==
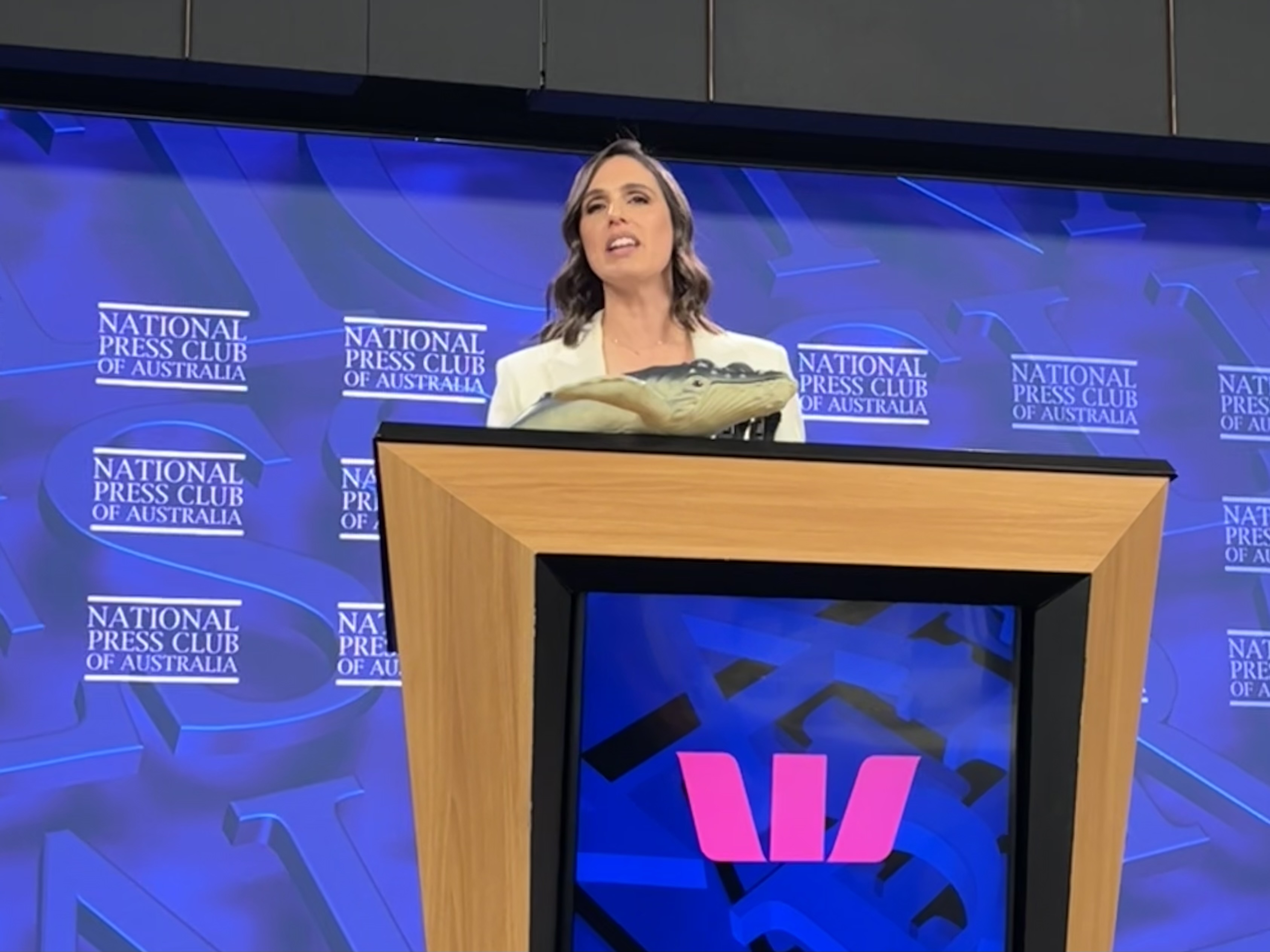
Dr Vanessa Pirotta, Superstar of STEM, speaks at the National Press Club in Canberra, September 2025.

=== Young South Australian of the Year 2024, Tiahni Adamson ===
Adamson was recognised as a Australian wildlife conservation biologist and advocate for Indigenous Australians and women in STEM. Adamson is an Aboriginal and Torres Strait Islander woman of the Kaurareg Nations.

- VIDEO: Meet your 2024 Young Australians of the Year
- South Australia's 2024 Australian of the Year Awards announced

=== National Press Club address, Dr Vanessa Pirotta ===
Pirotta called for a national rethink of Australia's science investment. She drew on her Superstars of STEM training and journey as an Australian scientist, outlining three key pillars to help reverse Australia's brain drain and reignite national curiosity about STEM. The pillars were education, science communication and investment.
