= Sydney Institute of Marine Science =

Marine science research institute

The Sydney Institute of Marine Science (SIMS) is a research institute focused on marine science in Sydney, Australia. It is a partnership among four Sydney universities: Macquarie University, the University of NSW (UNSW), the University of Sydney, and the University of Technology Sydney (UTS).

== History ==
The Sydney Institute of Marine Science (SIMS) was founded in 2005.

Renowned marine scientist and conservationist Frank Talbot, former director of the Australian Museum and the Smithsonian Natural History Museum was instrumental in its establishment, and was appointed as the founding chair in February 2006. He worked full-time in this position until his retirement on 31 December 2009, just before his 80th birthday, but continued as a board member. Peter Steinberg was the first director and CEO of SIMS.

From around 2010 to 2012, funded by the Commonwealth and NSW Governments as well as private donors to the tune of about A$20 million, a significant upgrade to the facilities was undertaken including offices, laboratories and aquaria.

In 2012, Emma Johnston was director of the Sydney Harbour Research Program, a flagship research project for SIMS. In that year, she was named NSW Scientist of the Year for Excellence in Biological Sciences (Plant, Agriculture and Environment) in the NSW Science and Engineering Awards. (Note: "The NSW Science and Engineering Awards were initiated in 2008 to recognise and reward the State’s leading researchers in science and engineering for cutting edge work that generates economic, health, environmental or technological benefits for NSW.")

== Description ==
SIMS is a collaborative research and training institute based on a partnership among its four founding Sydney universities: Macquarie, UNSW, Sydney University, and UTS, and now includes additional partner universities, the University of Wollongong and University of Western Sydney, as well as collaborations with several state and federal government departments, along with the Australian Museum. More than 100 scientists and graduate students are associated with the institute.

The institute is located near the Sydney Heads, at Chowder Bay and Georges Heights, Mosman, in historic buildings leased from the Sydney Harbour Federation Trust. It includes a seawater aquarium used for research purposes, with sophisticated capabilities.

The aims of SIMS include "developing, activating and communicating the science we need, for the oceans we want, throughout the UN Decade of Ocean Science for Sustainable Development (2021–2030), and beyond.

== Governance ==
SIMS is a not-for-profit, unlisted company, overseen by a board of directors and a director/CEO. Its Scientific Advisory Committee guides its research.

In early 2021, Martina Doblin, professor of oceanography at UTS, was appointed director and CEO of SIMS. As of November 2024 she remains in the positione.

=== Funding ===
Initial funding came from both state and federal governments, and the Ian Potter Foundation and Thyne Reid Foundation provided additional support to create the facilities. The SIMS Foundation is responsible for raising funds from charitable organisations, grants, and private donors.

== Research ==
SIMS' fields of research include:

- oceanography, including functioning as the New South Wales node for the Commonwealth-funded Integrated Marine Observing System (IMOS)
- climate change science, with particular reference to changes in the characteristics of the East Australian Current
- coastal geomorphology
- marine microbiology
- impacts of urbanisation on Sydney Harbour

== Major projects ==
=== Sydney Harbour Research Program ===
The Sydney Harbour Research Program was a major project for SIMS, led by director Emma Johnston. It aimed for high-quality cross-disciplinary research that included an effective community outreach program.

=== Project Restore and its predecessors ===
Project Restore was created to combine existing UNSW and SIMS restoration programs, including Operation Crayweed, Operation Poisodonia, Living Seawalls, and Fish Habitat enhancement. The project is led by SIMS, in a collaboration with UNSW Sydney, Macquarie, and Sydney University.

The Living Seawalls project, which was launched in 2018, aims to help many of the marine species in the harbour to flourish, thus enhancing its biodiversity, by modifying the design of its seawalls. It entails covering parts of the seawalls with specially designed tiles that mimic natural microhabitats - with crevices and other features that more closely resemble natural rocks. In September 2021, the Living Seawalls project was announced as a finalist for the international environment award the Earthshot Prize. In 2025, the Living Seawall project was awarded the 2025 Eureka Prize for Environmental Research.

In 2022 the NSW Government committed A$4.5 million to Project Restore. The project is said to be unique in that it is a large-scale project that aims to restore different habitat types at the same time, to restore seascapes in Sydney Harbour. The four projects had operated independently before, but the holistic approach could be used as a template for other restorations in Australia and around the world. The project also has a strong focus on science communication and community engagement. Traditionally, restoration of environments have been focused on a specific habitat.

== Role in other studies and projects ==
In 2022 SIMS became a partner in the "Seabirds to Seascapes" project, led by the NSW Department of Planning and Environment, along with the Taronga Conservation Society and NSW National Parks and Wildlife Service. The project includes replanting of seagrass meadows and kelp forests in nine or more locations in Sydney Harbour, in a bid to boost biodiversity and improve water quality in the harbour.

SIMS provided habitat support for a study conducted by researchers from the University of Sydney about the behaviour of juvenile crown-of-thorns starfish, which are a major threat to coral reefs. The report was published in May 2024.
