= Melbourne University Private =

Melbourne University Private (MUP) was a private university by the University of Melbourne in Australia, which operated from July 1998 to 2013. It was designed as a profit making venture, independent of as much government control as possible, in an attempt to maneuver around some of the limitations of legislation governing public universities. It was the brainchild of former Vice-Chancellor Alan Gilbert. It also allowed the public university to operate a management model and mission more akin to private market-driven universities in the USA (like the University of Phoenix). MUP's main potential markets were businesspeople and students of languages and international development, both in Australia and overseas.

== Facilities ==
A new area of buildings was built immediately south of the main University of Melbourne campus, and one was earmarked for MUP. Controversially, this development involved the removal of old terrace houses and a lawn bowls club. However the upset was placated somewhat by the restoration of other buildings and the creation of a new public square. Despite the strong efforts of its parent, MUP's early life was less than successful, and it was downgraded to operating from the Hawthorn Language Centre in a Melbourne suburb. The multimillion-dollar building in which MUP maintained a small office was soon taken over by the public university, and named the "Alan Gilbert Building".

== Distance learning ==
A major part of MUP's work was to produce curriculum for distance education courses to be delivered through the Universitas 21 (U21) platform, and latterly in its own right.

The distance education platform U21Global struggled to attract interest, and demand for its courses fell well below expectations. U21Global was ultimately sold to a private operator, with heavy losses.

The situation was made worse when the federal government changed its rules, allowing public universities to offer full fee paying courses to a broader range of people. This was also a time when more Australian universities started opening overseas campuses and otherwise delivering their courses offshore, as well as more actively bringing foreign students to Australia.

== Re-accreditation ==
MUP attracted the scrutiny of the Labor state government in 2001, but was subsequently re-accredited in 2003, with targets to increase research performance. However, its future dimmed when Alan Gilbert accepted a position at the University of Manchester in England in 2003. His successor, Glyn Davis, proved to be much more centrist, and was not fond of the private entity. John Cain, former Premier of Victoria, was one of MUP's most vocal critics, and his book Off Course pointed to shortcomings of MUP.

== Closing ==
On 7 June 2013, only months into his term, Glyn Davis announced that Melbourne University Private would close. Some of it, including the School of Enterprise, was merged with the University of Melbourne and continues to function.

The university lost A$20 million, although this is believed to be a conservative estimate given the pre-startup investment costs, which Cain and other critics put as high as A$150 million. At the announcement of its closure, the private university had 600 fee-paying students, a growing number but less than targeted (2500 were hoped to be enrolled in 2008).
