= Nalini Joshi =

Australian mathematician

Nalini Joshi AO
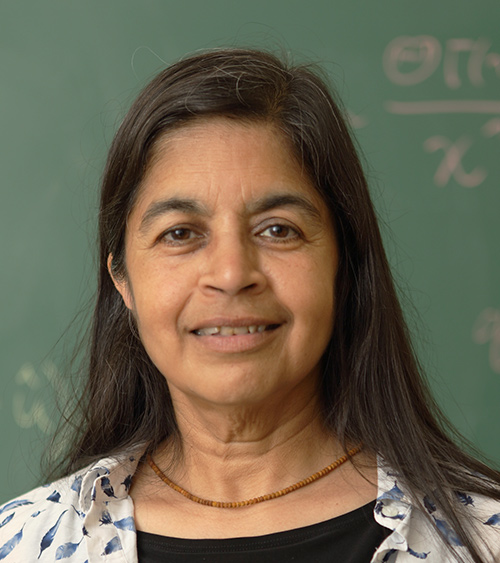
- Joshi in 2014
- Born: Yangon, Myanmar
- Education: Princeton University
- Known for: Research in integrable systems
- Awards: Georgina Sweet Fellowship (2012); George Szekeres Medal (2020); ANZIAM Medal (2021)
- Scientific career
- Fields: Mathematics, integrable systems
- Workplaces: University of Sydney; University of Adelaide; University of New South Wales
- Thesis: The Connection Problem for the First and Second Painlevé Transcendents (1987)
- Doctoral advisor: Martin David Kruskal

Nalini Joshi AO is an Australian mathematician. Since 2002 and as of March 2026 she is Chair of Applied Mathematics and a professor in the School of Mathematics and Statistics at the University of Sydney, the first female mathematician to be appointed professor at the university. Her research concerns integrable systems. She is a past president of the Australian Mathematical Society, and in July 2018 was elected vice-president of the International Mathematical Union, the first Australian to hold this position. She was awarded the Georgina Sweet Australian Laureate Fellowship in 2012.

== Early life and education ==
Nalini Joshi was born Yangon, Myanmar (Burma), and spent her childhood in Burma. In 2007, she described her experience growing up there:

My father was in the army and I grew up near jungles with wild animals. I had the freedom to explore all day long so long as I went to school and that's what I actually seek every time I look at mathematics; it's an adventure, an exploration, forging new paths into territories nobody else has looked at before.

— Nalini Joshi(2007)

Joshi attended Fort Street High School in Sydney, and gained her Bachelor of Science with honours in 1980 at the University of Sydney. She earned her PhD at Princeton University in the United States, under the supervision of Martin David Kruskal. Her PhD thesis was entitled The Connection Problem for the First and Second Painlevé Transcendents.

== Career ==
After a postdoctoral fellowship in 1987 and a research fellowship and lectureship (1988–90), both at the Australian National University, Joshi took up a lectureship at the University of New South Wales in Sydney (1990–94) and was promoted to senior lecturer in 1994.

In 1997, she won an Australian Research Council (ARC) senior research fellowship, which she took up at the University of Adelaide, and became an associate professor/reader at that university a year later.

In 2002 she moved to the University of Sydney as Chair of Applied Mathematics; since 2006 she has been director of the Centre for Mathematical Biology, from 2007 to 2009 head of the School of Mathematics and Statistics at Sydney University (associate head from 2010). She was the first female mathematician to be appointed professor at the university. first woman to hold this position. She is also a member of the School's Applied Mathematics Research Group. As of March 2026 she remains Chair of Applied Mathematics at the School.

== Other achievements and roles ==
Joshi has held a number of positions in the Australian Mathematical Society, including its presidency from December 2008 to September 2010. She was a board member of the Australian Mathematics Trust (2010–13), and joined the National Committee for Mathematical Sciences in January 2010.

In 2015, Joshi co-founded and co-chaired the Science in Australia Gender Equity (SAGE) program, which works to increase retention of women in STEM fields using Athena SWAN principles.

Since 2016, she has served as a member of the SAGE Expert Advisory Group.

== Awards and honours ==
Joshi was elected a fellow of the Australian Academy of Science in March 2008, the third woman to be elected to the Australian Academy of Science. She is also a Fellow of the Royal Society of New South Wales (FRSN).

In 2012, Joshi became a Georgina Sweet Australian Laureate Fellow, which involves the five-year project, Geometric construction of critical solutions of nonlinear systems.

In 2015, she was the 150th Anniversary Hardy Lecturer, an award by the London Mathematical Society involving an extensive series of lectures throughout the United Kingdom.

In June 2016, she was appointed an Officer of the Order of Australia.

Joshi was elected vice-president of the International Mathematical Union in July 2018, the first Australian to hold this position.

She was recognised in the October 2019 NSW Premier's Prizes for Science & Engineering for "Excellence in Mathematics, Earth Sciences, Chemistry or Physics".

In 2020, Joshi was awarded the George Szekeres Medal from the Australian Mathematical Society (AMS). She was awarded the 2021 ANZIAM Medal by Australia and New Zealand Industrial and Applied Mathematics for "unparalleled contributions to applied mathematics in leadership, gender equity, and promotion of mathematics".

Joshi was named NSW Scientist of the Year in 2025, the first time the award has been made to a mathematician.
