= Duncan Maskell =

British biochemist and academic (born 1961)

Duncan Maskell FMedSci

Vice Chancellor of the University of Melbourne
- In office 1 October 2018 – February 2025
- Preceded by: Glyn Davis
- Succeeded by: Emma Johnston

Personal details
- Born: Duncan John Maskell; 30 May 1961 (age 65)
- Education: Gonville and Caius College, Cambridge (BA, PhD)

Academic background
- Thesis: Mechanisms of Resistance and Immunity to Salmonella Infections (1986)
- Doctoral advisor: Carlos Hormaeche

Academic work
- Discipline: Biochemistry
- Sub-discipline: Molecular microbiology; Bacterial infectious diseases
- Institutions: University of Cambridge; University of Melbourne

Duncan John Maskell (born 30 May 1961) is a British and Australian biochemist, academic, and academic administrator, who specialises in molecular microbiology and bacterial infectious diseases. He was vice-chancellor of the University of Melbourne, Australia from 2018 to 2025. He previously taught at the University of Cambridge, England.

== Early life and education ==
Maskell grew up in north London. He was educated at Queen Elizabeth's School for Boys, then a comprehensive school in Barnet.

He has discussed the important role music played in his upbringing. He performed at the 60th birthday of Benjamin Britten as an 11 year old boy.

He studied Natural Sciences at Gonville and Caius College, Cambridge, graduating with a Bachelor of Arts (BA) degree. He undertook a Doctor of Philosophy (PhD) degree in Cambridge's Department of Pathology on Salmonella infections and graduated in 1986. His doctoral thesis was titled "Mechanisms of resistance and immunity to salmonella infections" and was submitted in 1985.

== Academic career ==
After doctoral work, Maskell worked as a research scientist for Wellcome Biotech from 1985 to 1988, then as a research fellow at the Institute of Molecular Medicine, University of Oxford, from 1988 to 1992. In 1992, he joined Imperial College, London as a lecturer in its Department of Biochemistry.

=== University of Cambridge ===
In 1996, he was appointed Marks & Spencer Professor of Farm Animal Health, Food Science and Food Safety at the University of Cambridge. He was elected a fellow of Wolfson College, Cambridge in 1998. He also served as Head of the Department of Veterinary Medicine from 2004 to 2013, and Head of the School of Biological Sciences from 2013 to 2015. He served as the University of Cambridge's Senior Pro-Vice Chancellor from 2015 to 2018.

=== University of Melbourne ===
On 1 October 2018, Maskell replaced Glyn Davis as vice-chancellor at the University of Melbourne. In May 2022, he was reappointed for a second term. In 2022, his annual remuneration as vice-chancellor was $1,500,000-$1,514,999; this included a fringe benefit associated with a residence owned by the University to the value of $301,541. Following a series of campaigns and protests by the National Tertiary Education Union's Casual Network, including a protest outside the Vice Chancellor's 33 room residence, Maskell issued an apology regarding underpayment, saying there was “a systemic failure of respect from this institution" towards insecurely employed staff. The university eventually provided $45 million in back pay to former and current employees.

Following the impact of the COVID-19 pandemic on travel and immigration, the university was affected due to its reliance on revenue from international students. He announced widespread staff redundancies reducing the university's headcount by 450 people in August 2020.

In 2023, staff strikes led by the NTEU protesting declining pay and job security for staff at the University of Melbourne specifically targeted Maskell at events such as the June 2023 University of Melbourne Council Meeting.

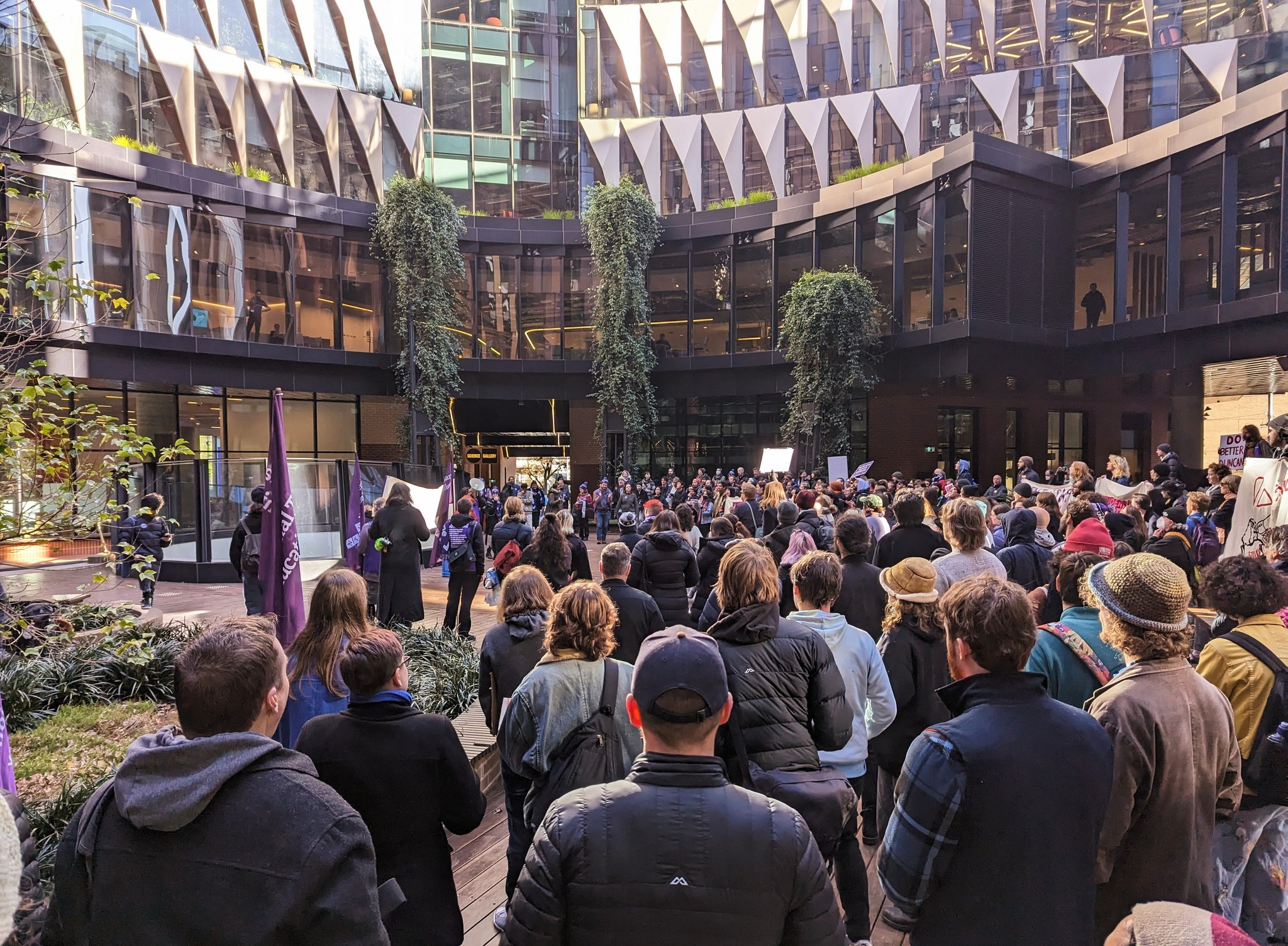
University of Melbourne staff protest a meeting attended by Duncan Maskell over falling pay, job security, and working conditions.

On 29 April 2024, Maskell announced that he would conclude his term as Vice-Chancellor by March 2025.

== Honours ==
In 2011, Maskell was elected a Fellow of the Academy of Medical Sciences (FMedSci). He became an Australian citizen in 2023.

== Selected works ==
- Maskell, Duncan J.; Sweeney, Kathy J.; O'Callaghan, David; Hormaeche, Carlos E.; Liew, Foo Y.; Dougan, Gordon (March 1987). "Salmonella typhimuriumaroA mutants as carriers of the Escherichia coli heat-labile enterotoxin B subunit to the murine secretory and systemic immune systems". Microbial Pathogenesis. 2 (3): 211–221. doi:10.1016/0882-4010(87)90022-2. PMID 3333799.
- O'Callaghan, D.; Maskell, D.; Liew, F. Y.; Easmon, C. S.; Dougan, G. (1 February 1988). "Characterization of aromatic- and purine-dependent Salmonella typhimurium: attention, persistence, and ability to induce protective immunity in BALB/c mice". Infection and Immunity. 56 (2): 419–423. doi:10.1128/IAI.56.2.419-423.1988. ISSN 0019-9567. PMC 259298. PMID 3276625.
- Reeves, Peter R.; Hobbs, Matthew; Valvano, Miguel A.; Skurnik, Mikael; Whitfield, Chris; Coplin, David; Kido, Nobuo; Klena, John; Maskell, Duncan; Raetz, Christian R.H.; Rick, Paul D. (December 1996). "Bacterial polysaccharide synthesis and gene nomenclature". Trends in Microbiology. 4 (12): 495–503. doi:10.1016/S0966-842X(97)82912-5. PMID 9004408.
- Parkhill, Julian; Sebaihia, Mohammed; Preston, Andrew; Murphy, Lee D; Thomson, Nicholas; Harris, David E; Holden, Matthew T G; Churcher, Carol M; Bentley, Stephen D; Mungall, Karen L; Cerdeño-Tárraga, Ana M; Temple, Louise; James, Keith; Harris, Barbara; Quail, Michael A; Achtman, Mark; Atkin, Rebecca; Baker, Steven; Basham, David; Bason, Nathalie; Cherevach, Inna; Chillingworth, Tracey; Collins, Matthew; Cronin, Anne; Davis, Paul; Doggett, Jonathan; Feltwell, Theresa; Goble, Arlette; Hamlin, Nancy; Hauser, Heidi; Holroyd, Simon; Jagels, Kay; Leather, Sampsa; Moule, Sharon; Norberczak, Halina; O'Neil, Susan; Ormond, Doug; Price, Claire; Rabbinowitsch, Ester; Rutter, Simon; Sanders, Mandy; Saunders, David; Seeger, Katherine; Sharp, Sarah; Simmonds, Mark; Skelton, Jason; Squares, Robert; Squares, Steven; Stevens, Kim; Unwin, Louise; Whitehead, Sally; Barrell, Bart G; Maskell, Duncan J (10 August 2003). "Comparative analysis of the genome sequences of Bordetella pertussis, Bordetella parapertussis and Bordetella bronchiseptica". Nature Genetics. 35 (1): 32–40. doi:10.1038/ng1227. PMID 12910271.
- Holt, Kathryn E; Parkhill, Julian; Mazzoni, Camila J; Roumagnac, Philippe; Weill, François-Xavier; Goodhead, Ian; Rance, Richard; Baker, Stephen; Maskell, Duncan J; Wain, John; Dolecek, Christiane; Achtman, Mark; Dougan, Gordon (27 July 2008). "High-throughput sequencing provides insights into genome variation and evolution in Salmonella Typhi". Nature Genetics. 40 (8): 987–993. doi:10.1038/ng.195. PMC 2652037. PMID 18660809.
- Mastroeni, P. and D. Maskell (eds.). 2006. Salmonella infections: clinical, immunological, and molecular aspects. Cambridge: Cambridge University Press.
- García-Álvarez, Laura; Holden, Matthew TG; Lindsay, Heather; Webb, Cerian R; Brown, Derek FJ; Curran, Martin D; Walpole, Enid; Brooks, Karen; Pickard, Derek J; Teale, Christopher; Parkhill, Julian; Bentley, Stephen D; Edwards, Giles F; Girvan, E Kirsty; Kearns, Angela M; Pichon, Bruno; Hill, Robert LR; Larsen, Anders Rhod; Skov, Robert L; Peacock, Sharon J; Maskell, Duncan J; Holmes, Mark A (August 2011). "Meticillin-resistant Staphylococcus aureus with a novel mecA homologue in human and bovine populations in the UK and Denmark: a descriptive study". The Lancet Infectious Diseases. 11 (8): 595–603. doi:10.1016/S1473-3099(11)70126-8. PMC 3829197. PMID 21641281.
- Mather, A. E.; Reid, S. W. J.; Maskell, D. J.; Parkhill, J.; Fookes, M. C.; Harris, S. R.; Brown, D. J.; Coia, J. E.; Mulvey, M. R.; Gilmour, M. W.; Petrovska, L.; de Pinna, E.; Kuroda, M.; Akiba, M.; Izumiya, H.; Connor, T. R.; Suchard, M. A.; Lemey, P.; Mellor, D. J.; Haydon, D. T.; Thomson, N. R. (12 September 2013). "Distinguishable Epidemics of Multidrug-Resistant Salmonella Typhimurium DT104 in Different Hosts". Science. 341 (6153): 1514–1517. Bibcode:2013Sci...341.1514M. doi:10.1126/science.1240578. PMC 4012302. PMID 24030491.

Academic offices
Preceded by Glyn Davis	Vice-Chancellor of the University of Melbourne; 2018–2025	Succeeded by Emma Johnston
