= Alan Gilbert (Australian academic) =

Australian historian

- Born: 11 September 1944; Brisbane, Australia
- Died: 27 July 2010 (aged 65); Manchester, England
- Education: Australian National University; Nuffield College, Oxford

Alan David Gilbert AO (11 September 1944 – 27 July 2010) was an Australian historian and academic administrator who was president and vice-chancellor of the University of Manchester between 2004 and 2010.

During his tenure (1996–2004) as vice-chancellor of the University of Melbourne, he pushed for and established Melbourne University Private, a private university offshoot which ultimately failed. This, and his well-known controversial views on private funding of universities, led to Richard Davis in 2002 dubbing him the "doyen of economically rationalist vice-chancellors".

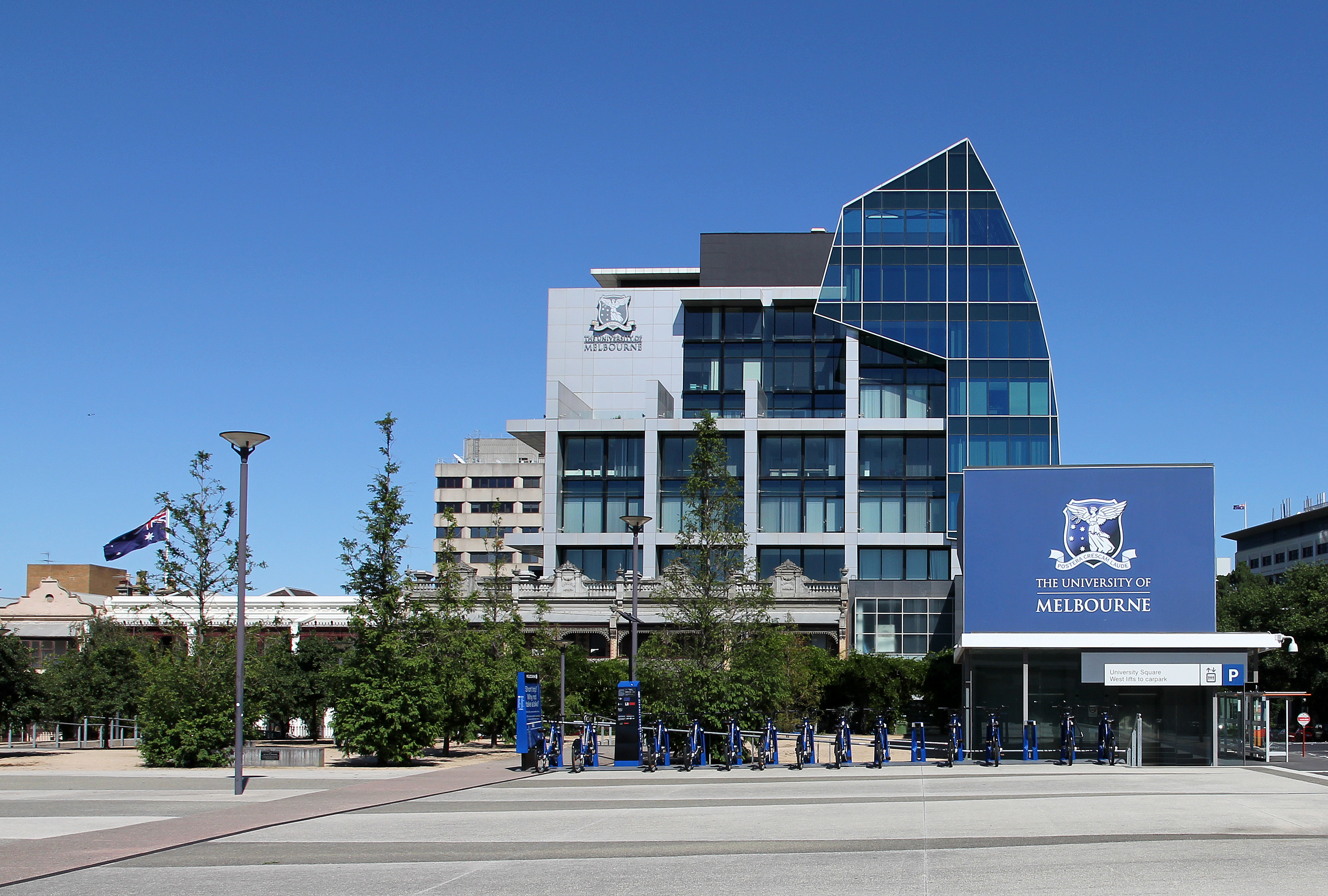
The building named as Alan Gilbert at the University of Melbourne

== Early academic career ==
Gilbert graduated with a first class BA at the Australian National University in 1965, then took an MA in history and took a post as lecturer at the University of Papua New Guinea in 1967. He gained a scholarship at Nuffield College, Oxford and he was awarded a DPhil in 1973.

He returned to Australia as a lecturer at the University of New South Wales, where he established an academic reputation as an historian working in the social, socio-economic and religious history of modern Britain and Australia.

He was appointed professor of history in the Faculty of Military Studies in 1981. He was elected as a fellow of the Academy of Social Sciences in Australia in 1990. He became chair of the Faculty of Military Studies in 1982, and later pro-vice chancellor of the University of New South Wales (1988–1990). In 1991, he became vice-chancellor and principal of the University of Tasmania at the time of the merger of the university with the Launceston CAE.

== University of Melbourne ==
In 1996, Gilbert was appointed vice-chancellor of the University of Melbourne. He played the key role in establishing and subsequently developing Melbourne University Private Limited (MUP), a private university established to work alongside the University of Melbourne, so as to circumvent regulations strictly limiting the money-making educational ventures of Australian universities. This was pursued despite numerous buildings on campus in serious states of disrepair and inadequate funding to allow lecture theatres to be heated. The venture was a financial disaster and was widely criticised by academics, politicians and the media. To rescue MUP, the University Council borrowed $150 million from the National Australia Bank and agreed to provide additional money from its investment reserves. The present University of Melbourne VC, Glyn Davis, announced the closure of MUP on 7 May 2005, citing no need for such a venture now that market ventures are permitted in the public university sector, and their plans to integrate most of MUP back into the public university. Gilbert declined to comment on the actions of his successor. The building originally intended for MUP, and now a part of the public university, has been named the Alan Gilbert Building.

Gilbert attracted the ire of both students and staff. A staff strike took place on 22 October 1999 over lack of clarity over pay and conditions; administrative offices were occupied by students protesting the introduction of fee-paying places in 1997, and again in April 2001 when there were 70 arrests.

In the book Off Course: From Public Place to Market Place at Melbourne University, Gilbert was accused of making the university a "quasi-privatised institution in the corporate mould".

== University of Manchester ==
Gilbert left the University of Melbourne to be appointed president and vice chancellor of the new University of Manchester in England, an institution established in October 2004 by the merger of the Victoria University of Manchester and UMIST. He was quoted as saying he had "no plans for a private university of Manchester", although he was said to advocate performance-related pay, a position thought likely to put him in conflict with the university lecturers union, the UCU.

Gilbert's plans for the new university were ambitious:

Our aim is to make the University of Manchester one of the top 25 research-led universities in the world. It will be an educational and research powerhouse that is at home in England's North-West and committed to regional as well as national and international agendas. Without seeking to emulate the social cachet of Oxbridge or America's Ivy League, it will take its place confidently alongside those virtuoso institutions in its research capability and performance, in the quality of the students and staff that it attracts and in the reputation for scholarly excellence that it secures.

According to the university's strategic plan (largely a copy of his earlier and now abandoned Melbourne Agenda (2002)) the university aimed to have five Nobel Laureates on its staff by 2015, at least two of whom would have full-time appointments, and three of which it was intended to secure by 2007. During Gilbert's tenure as vice chancellor, a Nobel Prize winner in economics, Joseph Stiglitz, was appointed the head of the Brooks World Poverty Institute at Manchester, and Sir John Sulston was appointed to a chair in the Faculty of Life Sciences. After Gilbert's death Andre Geim and Konstantin Novoselov, both of whom were appointed before Gilbert moved to Manchester, were awarded the Nobel Prize for Physics in 2010.

Gilbert continued:

By investing heavily in world class people and offering them state-of-the-art facilities, we aim to make the University of Manchester a destination of preference for many of the best students, teachers, researchers and scholars in the world. More than anything else, the success of the Manchester 2015 Agenda will be driven by the impact of internationally pre-eminent researchers and research clusters on the scholarly culture of the University generally.

Central to Project Unity, the name given to the plan to merge, was the idea of extending the Golden Triangle of Oxford Cambridge and the London universities UCL and Imperial to a Golden Quadrilateral. "With this work much progress has been made" by the results for 2008.

Gilbert's address to the university during the inauguration ceremony in the Whitworth Hall on 22 October 2004 made it clear that he believed the plan was achievable and listed five key elements in the transition from "good to great", quoting the book of that title by Jim Collins.

One of the intentions of Gilbert's 2015 agenda was an improvement in Manchester's position in international league tables. In 2004 the university ranked 78th in the Shanghai Jiao Tong Academic Ranking of World Universities, which rose to 53rd in 2005 following the merger with UMIST. Progress continued over the next few years, with the university being ranked 50th in 2006, 48th in 2007, and 40th in 2008, before falling back to 41st in 2009. This ranking measures indicators such as Nobel Prize winners and highly cited authors: 154 were listed on ISI HighlyCited.com, for Manchester, and improved partly as a result of the appointment of such people. Gilbert was quoted in an interview as saying that "there is only one ranking that matters-–the world ranking of global universities produced by Shanghai Jiao Tong University".

Up to 2007 £388.5m had been spent on new buildings, funded in part by government grants and sale of other assets. However, Gilbert announced that due to increases in salary costs and energy bills, together with lower than expected revenue, the university was about £30m (5% of its annual turnover) in deficit. Gilbert announced plans for 400 redundancies, and he and the university management were criticised by the University and College Union. However, Gilbert had as of 2007 honoured his pledge to achieve the staff reductions without compulsory redundancies, and in October 2007 announced that the university's budget had been brought into "a modest surplus" as a result mainly of a voluntary redundancy scheme.

In 2008 Gilbert announced a "root-and-branch review" of Manchester's teaching quality, stating that the university's "strategy to join the world's elite universities will be worthless unless staff can be 're-invented' to interact more with students".

In the aftermath of the 2008 Research Assessment Exercise, Gilbert was quoted by Dame Nancy Rothwell as saying to the senate of the university:

It is vital for the University to be strengthening its research profile through research selectivity (in the sense of investing in quality and divesting in [sic] mediocrity) and research concentration (in the sense of investing to develop and/or sustain world leading clusters of supreme excellence). If we do not make major progress on that research re-profiling agenda over the next year or so we will have lost a priceless opportunity.

On 14 January 2010, the University of Manchester announced that Gilbert would be retiring from his position as president and vice chancellor of the university. Dame Nancy Rothwell was then appointed acting vice chancellor. Her appointment as the new vice chancellor was announced on 21 June 2010.

October 2012 saw the opening of the Alan Gilbert Learning Commons, named in honour of the former president. The building provides a variety of state-of-the-art individual and group study facilities and is managed by the University of Manchester Library.

== Personal life and death ==
Gilbert was married to Ingrid, whom he married in 1967. They had two daughters, Michelle and Fiona.

He died on 27 July 2010 in hospital in Manchester following a serious illness for the last few months of his life.

== Publications ==
- 1973: The Growth and Decline of Nonconformity in England and Wales, with special reference to the period before 1850: an historical interpretation of statistics of religious practice. Thesis (D.Phil.)--University of Oxford (Nuffield College).
- 1976: Religion and Society in Industrial England: church, chapel and social change, 1740–1914. London: Longman ISBN 0-582-48323-9
- 1977: Churches and Churchgoers: patterns of church growth in the British Isles since 1700. Oxford: Clarendon Press (with Robert Currie & Lee Horsley)
- 1980: The Making of Post-Christian Britain: a history of the secularization of modern society. London: Longman
- 2004: The Idea of a 21st Century University. (Audenshaw Papers; 208.) Torquay: Hinksey Network (8-page pamphlet)

Academic offices
| Preceded by Alec Lazenby | Vice-Chancellor of The University of Tasmania; 1991–1996 | Succeeded by Don McNicol |
| Preceded by David Penington | Vice-Chancellor of The University of Melbourne; 1996–2004 | Succeeded by Glyn Davis |
| Preceded by Sir Martin Harris | Vice-Chancellor of The University of Manchester; 2004–2010 | Succeeded by Nancy Rothwell |
