= Glyn Davis =

Australian academic and public servant (born 1959)

Glyn Davis AC FASSA
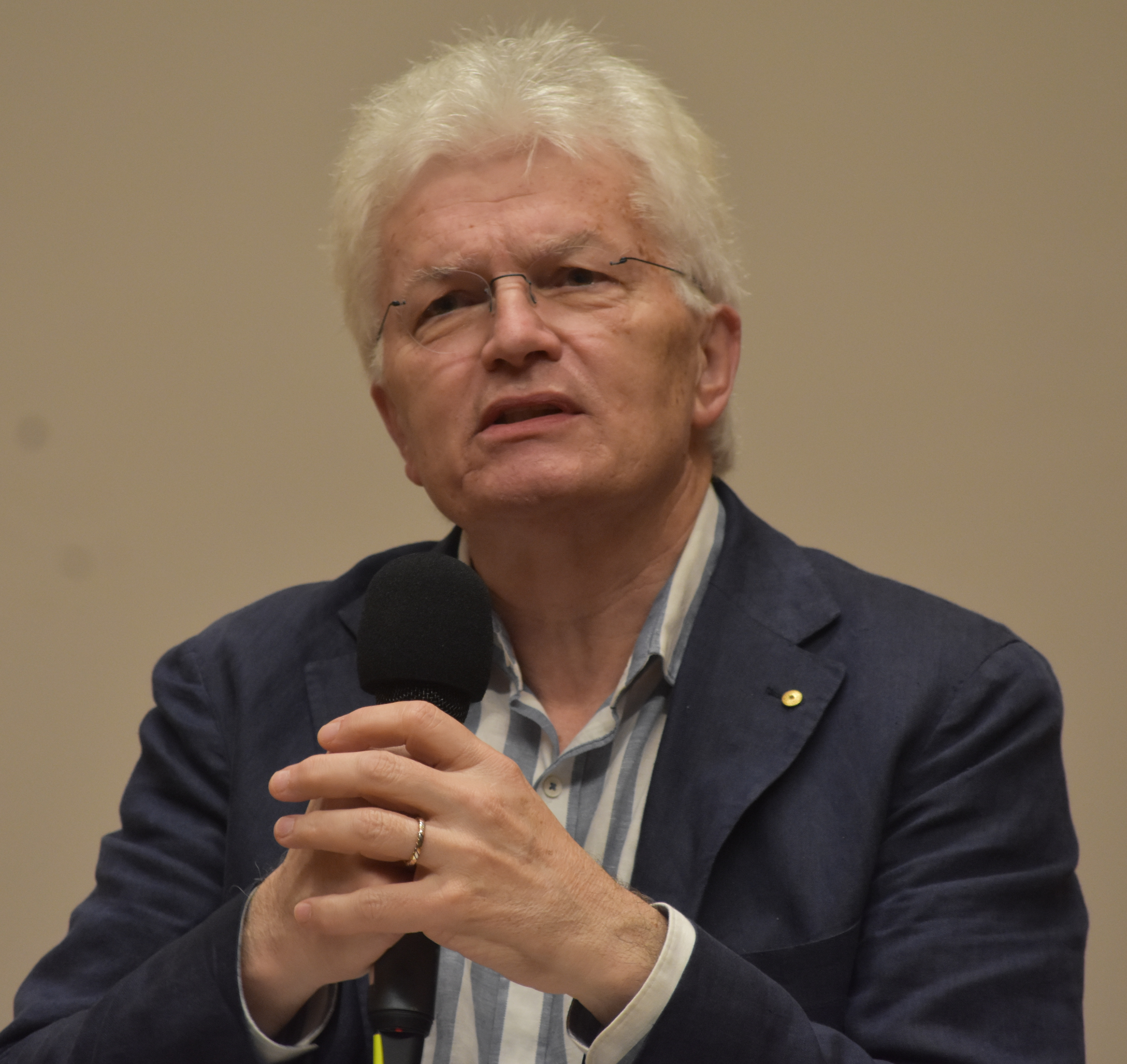
- Davis in 2025 at Trinity College

Vice Chancellor of the University of Melbourne
- In office 2 February 2026 – 5 October 2026; Acting
- Preceded by: Emma Johnston
- Succeeded by: Carolyn Evans
- In office 10 January 2005 – 30 September 2018
- Preceded by: Kwong Lee Dow
- Succeeded by: Duncan Maskell

Secretary of the Department of the Prime Minister and Cabinet
- In office 6 June 2022 – 16 June 2025
- Preceded by: Phil Gaetjens
- Succeeded by: Steven Kennedy

CEO of the Paul Ramsay Foundation
- In office 5 December 2018 – 6 June 2022
- Preceded by: Position established
- Succeeded by: Kristy Muir

Vice Chancellor of Griffith University
- In office January 2002 – 31 December 2004
- Preceded by: Roy Webb
- Succeeded by: Ian O'Connor

Personal details
- Born: Glyn Conrad Davis; 1959 (age 66–67) Sydney, Australia
- Spouse: Margaret Gardner
- Education: University of New South Wales (BA); Australian National University (PhD)

Glyn Conrad Davis AC FASSA (born 1959) is an Australian academic and public servant who has served as interim vice-chancellor of the University of Melbourne since February 2026. He previously served as the university's vice-chancellor from January 2005 to September 2018. Davis was the Secretary of the Department of Prime Minister and Cabinet from June 2022 to June 2025. He was an academic at Griffith University in Queensland from 1985 until his appointment as vice-chancellor in 2002, a role he occupied until 2005. In 2018, he was appointed as a distinguished professor at the Australian National University's Crawford School of Public Policy.

== Early life and education ==
Glyn Conrad Davis was born in Sydney, New South Wales, in 1959, and grew up there.

He was educated at Marist Brothers College, Kogarah.

Davis graduated with first-class honours in political science at the University of New South Wales. His thesis supervisor was journalist and public intellectual Donald Horne, whom he cites as a strong influence. He was offered a journalism cadetship, but turned it down and in favour of undertaking a PhD at the Australian National University. After this, he worked briefly the ABC's Canberra newsroom.

In 1982 he took a few months off working on his doctoral thesis and worked as a public servant on the inquiry into the public service, under the Fraser government.

Subsequently, while working at Griffith University (where he began lecturing in 1985), he was awarded a Harkness Fellowship for 1987–88 to work in the United States. He undertook post-doctoral appointments at the University of California, Berkeley, the Brookings Institution in Washington, D.C., and at the John F. Kennedy School of Government at Harvard University.

== Career ==
=== Early political appointments ===
Davis served simultaneously as an academic while appointed to various roles in government. He served as Commissioner for Public Sector Equity with the Public Sector Management Commission from 1990 to 1993, and as director-general of the Office of the Cabinet from 1995 to 1996 under Queensland Premier Wayne Goss.

He also served as director-general of the Department of the Premier and Cabinet to Peter Beattie, from 1998 to 2002.

=== Academia ===
Davis began his academic career at Griffith University. He commenced as a lecturer in public policy in 1985 and was appointed as a professor in 1998. While there, he "emphasised social justice, diversity and the university's public mission". He served as co-editor of the Australian Journal of Public Administration with John Wanna from 1996 to 2001.

Davis became third vice-chancellor (VC) and president of Griffith University in January 2002. As VC, he oversaw the establishment of the Griffith University School of Medicine and the acquisition of the former South Brisbane Library, an historic building on the South Bank which was refurbished to house Griffith Film School. He also replaced the university's coat of arms, as part of a major rebranding.

In January 2005 he was appointed vice-chancellor of the University of Melbourne, and led the introduction of the university's "Melbourne Curriculum" academic structure.

For nearly 14 years Davis served as vice-chancellor and principal of the University of Melbourne and as professor of political science in the Faculty of Arts. During his tenure there, he replaced 96 undergraduate degrees with six, increased the budget from $1.1 billion to $2.56 billion, and expanded the intake of international students.

On 12 January 2026, the University of Melbourne announced that Davis had been appointed interim vice-chancellor following the death of vice-chancellor Emma Johnston. He began in the role on 2 February 2026 while the university undertook a search for a permanent vice-chancellor.

=== Paul Ramsay Foundation ===
In December 2018, Davis was appointed the CEO of the Paul Ramsay Foundation, starting the position in January 2019. The foundation is the largest philanthropic endowment in Australia, and uses social science research to direct funding to disadvantaged communities.

=== Secretary of PMC ===
In June 2022, Davis became the Secretary of the Department of the Prime Minister and Cabinet. He was appointed by Prime Minister Anthony Albanese on 30 May 2022, and commenced on 6 June 2022. On 9 May 2025 he announced his resignation from the position, effective 16 June.

== Other activities and roles ==
Davis publishes on public policy. He was founding chairman of the Australia and New Zealand School of Government (ANZSOG) in 2002, and continued to play an important role there, including chairing the research committee, until his 2022 appointment as PM&C Secretary.

In 2003 he commissioned The Griffith Review.

In 2008, Davis co-chaired, with the prime minister (Kevin Rudd), the Australia 2020 Summit and, in the same year, served as a member of the Innovation Taskforce, an expert group commissioned to review Australia's research and innovation systems.

In 2010 Davis presented the ABC's 51st Boyer Lectures series, speaking on higher education in Australia.

As of 2018, he was serving on the boards of the Grattan Institute and the Melbourne Theatre Company, and also hosted a podcast called The Policy Shop, with the aim of contributing to public debate about both Australian and global policy challenges. He has also served on a range of other arts boards, including and the Queensland Theatre Company, and in 2021 he was elected chair of Opera Australia He has also partnered with First Nations community programs in the Goulburn–Murray valley and Cape York Peninsula.

On 18 February 2021, he delivered the inaugural Hugh Stretton Oration at the University of Adelaide.

As of 2022 he was patron of Australia 2021, a non-profit organisation focused on building research networks on issues impacting Australia's future.

=== Other roles in academia ===
Davis' career memberships include: chair of Universitas 21, Universities Australia,the Association of Pacific Rim Universities steering committee, the Hong Kong Grants Commission, and a director of the Menzies Centre for Australian Studies at King's College London. He was also president of the Group of Eight, which represents the major research universities in Australia.

In October 2018, Davis joined the Crawford School of Public Policy at the Australian National University (ANU) as a distinguished professor, a position jointly funded by the Griffith University and ANU. He was no longer in the position by June 2025.

As of June 2025 Davis is a visiting professor at the Policy Institute at King's College London, in the Blavatnik School of Government at Oxford (2018-2027), at the University of Manchester, and in the Faculty of Arts at the University of Melbourne. He is also a visiting fellow at Exeter College, Oxford.

== Recognition and honours ==
Davis received the Centenary Medal on Australia Day 2001, "in recognition of contribution to public service", and on 26 January 2002, Davis was appointed a Companion of the Order of Australia, the highest Australian honour, for his "service to public administration, particularly as an advocate for good governance, constitutional reform and the creation of infrastructure to enable the development of a "knowledge-based" nation, to tertiary education in the field of political science, and to the community."

He was elected a fellow of the Academy of Social Sciences in Australia in 2003.ref name=formergriffith/> He is also a fellow the Institute of Public Administration Australia.

He holds honorary doctorates from Griffith University (2006) and the University of New South Wales.

There are buildings named after him on the campus of Griffith University at Nathan (named Glyn Davis Building in 2010), and the Melbourne School of Design at the University of Melbourne Parkville, opened in 2010.

A photographic portrait of Glyn and his wife, Margaret Gardner, created by Australian photographer Jacqueline Mitelman in 2017, is held by the National Portrait Gallery in Canberra.

== Personal life ==
Davis married Margaret Gardner, the 30th Governor of Victoria and former Vice-Chancellor of Monash University and RMIT. When Davis was vice-chancellor of Melbourne University, he and his spouse were described by The Guardian as "Melbourne's top academic couple".

== Publications ==
Davis has written widely on policy and governance. Recent publications include:

- On Life's Lottery, Hachette, 2021.
- The Australian Idea of a University, Melbourne University Publishing, 2017.
- The Australian Policy Handbook (6th edition with Peter Bridgman and Catherine Althaus), Routledge, 2017.
- The Future of Australian Governance (co-editor with Michael Keating), St Leonards, NSW: Allen & Unwin, 2000.
- Are You Being Served? State, Citizens and Governance (co-editor with Patrick Weller), Crows Nest, NSW: Allen & Unwin, 2001.
- The Republic of Learning: higher education transforms Australia, Australian Broadcasting Corporation (Boyer Lectures), 2010.
- 'Universities in the Service of the Nation' in Melbourne University Law Review (2015) Volume 38(3) special issue in memory of Sir Zelman Cowen

== Footnotes ==
Academic offices
Preceded by Alan Gilbert	Vice-Chancellor of the University of Melbourne; 2005–2018	Succeeded by Duncan Maskell
