= Trevenna =

House in Armidale, New South Wales, Australia

Coordinates: 30.4886°S 151.6369°E

Trevenna is the residence of the Vice-Chancellor of the University of New England, in Armidale, New South Wales, Australia. The house was built in 1892 and is located off Trevenna Road on the western side of the main campus in Armidale. There is no public access to the property or gardens, but the gardens have been open for public viewing, on several occasions in recent years.

== History ==
Designed by Canadian-born, Boston-trained architect, John Horbury Hunt (1838–1904), Trevenna was originally the home of the Wrights, a prominent New England family of graziers. It was originally built for Mrs Eliza Jane Wright. The homestead and its grounds were bequeathed to UNE as the Vice-Chancellor's residence in 1960 by Mrs Florence May Wilson.

The Vice-Chancellors who have resided at Trevenna are:

- Sir Robert Madgwick (1962–1966)
- Sir Zelman Cowen (1966–1970)
- Professor Alec Lazenby (1970–1977)
- Professor Ronald Gates (1977–1985)
- Professor Lawrence W Nicol (1985–1988)
- Professor Don McNicol (1988–1990)
- Professor Robert HT Smith (1990–1994)
- Professor Bruce Thom (1994–1996)
- Professor Ingrid Moses (1997–2006)
- Professor Alan Pettigrew (2006–2009)
- Professor James Barber (2010–2014)
- Professor Annabelle Duncan (2014–2019)
- Professor Brigid Heywood (2019–2022)

It's not known if Professor Malcolm Eric Nairn, Vice- Chancellor in 1997, lived at Trevenna.

== Grounds ==
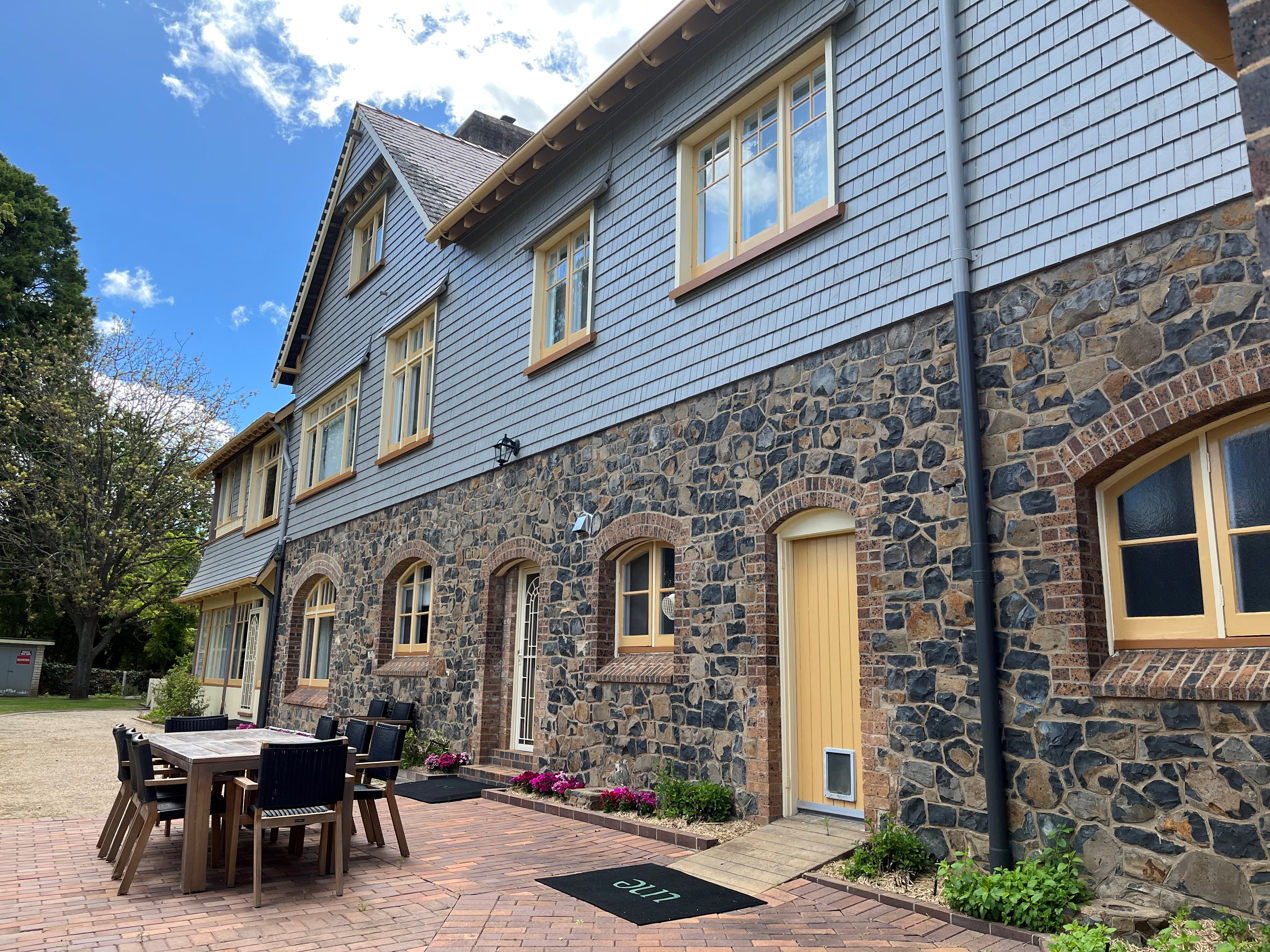
Rear of Trevenna house

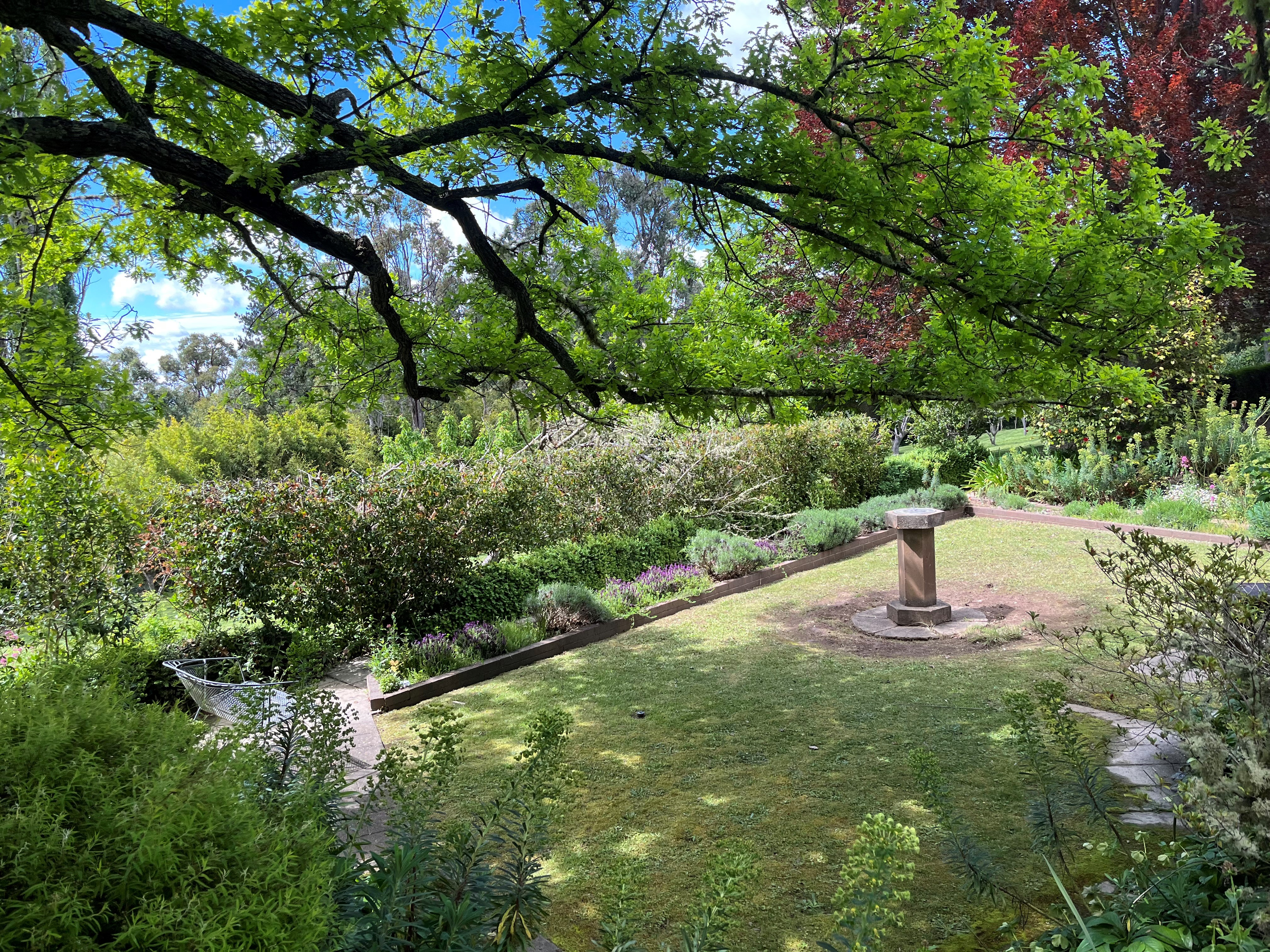
Sundial

The house itself comprises three storeys and features an imposing main entrance on the southern side. Some of the trees in its garden, including horse chestnuts, pines and planes, date back to the 1890s when Trevenna was built. The garden is constructed on several levels. A sunken garden, complete with stone sundial and fish pond, is on one side of the house, while on the other a series of hedges encloses a private lawn.

The grounds also feature a gardener's shed, the smaller Trevenna Cottage, and a clay tennis court. They also include a herb garden and orchard and numerous dry-stone walls, some of which have been overplanted with ivy hedges. A private gravel road of 300 metres, lined with pines and lamp posts on either side, leads off Trevenna Road and winds through parklands up to the house.

The front garden slopes away into a series of hedges and wide perennial borders lead the eye across the Bellevue area of the university with the city of Armidale and Mount Duval in the distance. Trevenna's gardens were the feature of a Woman's Weekly special in 1971.

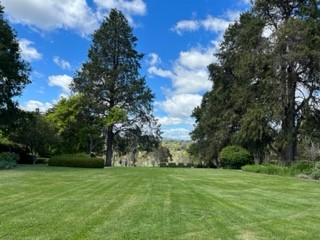
The lawn, looking toward Armidale and Mount Duval
