= Gordon Wallace (nanotechnologist) =

Australian nanotechnologist

Professor Gordon Wallace AO FAA FTSE FRACI
- Born: Gordon George Wallace; Belfast, Northern Ireland
- Title: Distinguished Professor at the University of Wollongong; Director of the Intelligent Polymer Research Institute, University of Wollongong
- Awards: Australian Laureate Fellowship (2011)

Gordon George Wallace is a scientist in the field of electromaterials. His students and collaborators use of nanotechnology in conjunction with organic conductors for energy conversion and storage as well as medical bionics. He has developed approaches to fabrication that allow material properties discovered in the nano world to be translated into micro structures and macro scopic devices.

Wallace's research interests include new materials and the use of these in energy and biomedical devices.

Wallace is currently Director of the Intelligent Polymer Research Institute and the former Director of the Australian National Fabrication Facility (Materials Node) both headquartered at the University of Wollongong. He was also previously Executive Research Director at the ARC Centre of Excellence for Electromaterials Science as well as Director of the Translational Research Initiative for Cellular Engineering and Printing (TRICEP).

== Career ==
Wallace graduated with a BSc Honours (chemistry and physics) in 1979 and then received a PhD in 1983.

He was awarded an Australian Research Council QEII Fellowship in 1991, an ARC Senior Research Fellowship in 1995, an ARC Professorial Fellowship in 2002 and a Federation Fellowship in 2006. He was awarded a DSc from Deakin University in 2000.

== Research years ==
Wallace asserted that this instability could, if understood, be directed and controlled, allowing the creation of "intelligent" polymers – materials that sense and respond to stimuli.

In September 2008, Wallace's team moved to research facilities at the University of Wollongong's new Innovation Campus based at North Wollongong.

He published the book Organic Bionics. He has an h index of 110 and has amassed in excess of 60,000 citations.

== Awards and honours ==
- Wallace was elected a Fellow of the Australian Academy of Technological Sciences and Engineering in 2003 and of the Australian Academy of Science in 2007.
- He was appointed as an Officer of the Order of Australia and Wollongong's Australia Day Ambassador in 2017.
- Later that year Wallace was named NSW Scientist of the Year.
- He received the Inaugural Polymer Science and Technology award from the Royal Australian Chemical Institute (RACI) in 1992. He was awarded an ETS Walton Fellowship by Science Foundation Ireland in 2003. In 2009 he was awarded a lifetime achievement award by SPIE.
- He was appointed to the Prime Ministers Knowledge Nation 100 in 2015. He received the Eureka Prize for Leadership in Science and Innovation in 2016.
- Australian Research Council (ARC) Laureate Fellowship, 2011
- Honorary member of the Royal Irish Academy

== Selected publications ==
- John, R.; Wallace, G.G. (1991). "The use of microelectrodes to probe the electropolymerization mechanism of heterocyclic conducting polymers". Journal of Electroanalytical Chemistry and Interfacial Electrochemistry. 306 (1–2): 157–167. doi:10.1016/0022-0728(91)85228-h.
- Majidi, Mir Reza; Kane-Maguire, Leon A.P.; Wallace, Gordon G. (1994). "Enantioselective electropolymerization of aniline in the presence of (+)- or (−)-camphorsulfonate ion: a facile route to conducting polymers with preferred one-screw-sense helicity". Polymer. 35 (14): 3113–3115. doi:10.1016/0032-3861(94)90427-8.
- Gelmi, Amy; Higgins, Michael J.; Wallace, Gordon G. (2010). "Physical surface and electromechanical properties of doped polypyrrole biomaterials". Biomaterials. 31 (8): 1974–1983. doi:10.1016/j.biomaterials.2009.11.040. PMID 20056273.
- Gandhi, M.R.; Murray, P.; Spinks, G.M.; Wallace, G.G. (1995). "Mechanism of electromechanical actuation in polypyrrole". Synthetic Metals. 73 (3): 247–256. doi:10.1016/0379-6779(95)80022-0.
- Zhao, H.; Price, W.E.; Wallace, G.G. (1994). "Effect of the counterion employed during synthesis on the properties of polypyrrole membranes". Journal of Membrane Science. 87 (1–2): 47–56. doi:10.1016/0376-7388(93)e0053-g.
- Spinks, G.M.; Liu, L.; Wallace, G.G.; Zhou, D. (2002). "Strain Response From Polypyrrole Actuators Under Load". Advanced Functional Materials. 12 (6–7): 437–440. doi:10.1002/1616-3028(20020618)12:6/7<437::aid-adfm437>3.0.co;2-i.
- Gilmore, Kerry J.; Kita, Magdalena; Han, Yao; Gelmi, Amy; Higgins, Michael J.; Moulton, Simon E.; Clark, Graeme M.; Kapsa, Robert; Wallace, Gordon G. (2009). "Skeletal muscle cell proliferation and differentiation on polypyrrole substrates doped with extracellular matrix components". Biomaterials. 30 (29): 5292–5304. doi:10.1016/j.biomaterials.2009.06.059. PMID 19643473.
- O'Connell, Cathal D.; Bella, Claudia Di; Thompson, Fletcher; Augustine, Cheryl; Beirne, Stephen; Rhys Cornock; Richards, Christopher J.; Chung, Johnson; Gambhir, Sanjeev (2016). "Development of the Biopen: a handheld device for surgical printing of adipose stem cells at a chondral wound site". Biofabrication. 8 (1) 015019. Bibcode:2016BioFa...8a5019O. doi:10.1088/1758-5090/8/1/015019. ISSN 1758-5090. PMID 27004561. S2CID 28304232.
- "Li, Dan; Müller, Marc B.; Gilje, Scott; Kaner, Richard B.; Wallace, Gordon G. (2008). "Processable aqueous dispersions of graphene nanosheets". Nature Nanotechnology. 3 (2): 101–105. Bibcode:2008NatNa...3..101L. doi:10.1038/nnano.2007.451. PMID 18654470.
- Baughman, Ray H.; Cui, Changxing; Zakhidov, Anvar A.; Iqbal, Zafar; Barisci, Joseph N.; Spinks, Geoff M.; Wallace, Gordon G.; Mazzoldi, Alberto; Rossi, Danilo De (21 May 1999). "Carbon Nanotube Actuators". Science. 284 (5418): 1340–1344. Bibcode:1999Sci...284.1340B. doi:10.1126/science.284.5418.1340. ISSN 0036-8075. PMID 10334985.
