= Alec Lazenby =

British agricultural sciences academic (born 1927)

Alec Lazenby AO
- Born: 4 March 1927 (age 99); Yorkshire, England
- Education: University of Cambridge
- Occupations: Academic, writer
- Known for: 3rd Vice-Chancellor of the University of New England; Vice-Chancellor of the University of Tasmania

Alec Lazenby AO (born 4 March 1927) is a British academic who has held positions at the University of Cambridge, University of New England, University of Tasmania, the Institute of Grassland and Environmental Research and the Welsh Plant Breeding Station. Lazenby served as the Vice-Chancellor of the University of New England from 1970 to 1976, and the University of Tasmania from 1982 to 1990.

== Early life and career ==
Lazenby was born in Yorkshire on 4 March 1927. He attended Wath Grammar School, before studying for a BSc and MSc in Agriculture at the University College of Wales, Aberystwyth. After spending time as a scientific officer at the Welsh Plant Breeding Station, he returned to academia to read for a PhD at the University of Cambridge, and both lectured and demonstrated there (latterly as a fellow of Fitzwilliam House) before moving to Armidale, New South Wales, Australia.

== University of New England ==
Lazenby was appointed the foundation Professor of Agronomy and head of the Department of Agronomy at the University of New England in February 1965 before being appointed the university's third Vice-Chancellor in 1970. He was appointed an emeritus professor when his term as Vice-Chancellor ended in 1977. During his time as Vice-Chancellor, Lazenby lived in the Vice-Chancellor's official residence "Trevenna".

In 1971, he strongly supported an amalgamation of the University of New England and the Armidale Teachers' College. In June 1971 he asked the Academic Planning Committee to comment on the possible amalgamation because he believed "Armidale was too small for two independent tertiary institutions." However the suggested amalgamation was opposed by the staff of both institutions and was eventually overturned by the Hawke government when it took office in 1983.

== Institute of Grassland and Environmental Research ==
Lazenby moved back to the UK in 1977 and took up a position as the Director of the Institute of Grassland and Environmental Research.

== Return to Australia ==
Lazenby returned to Australia in early 1982 and was appointed the Vice-Chancellor of the University of Tasmania on 21 October 1982 replacing David Caro. He held the position until 1990 and was succeeded by Alan Gilbert.

In 1985, then-Federal Minister for Primary Industry, John Kerin asked him to investigate the introduction of plant breeders' rights legislation, which was enacted in 1987.

== Honours and recognition ==
Lazenby was made an Officer of the Order of Australia in the 1988 New Year's Day Honours; the citation was "for service to learning". Lazenby also received the Centenary Medal in the 2001 New Year's Honours "for service to Australian society in rural science and technology". He was elected a fellow of the Australian Academy of Technological Sciences & Engineering in 1976.

== Bibliography ==
Lazenby has written and co-written a number of books on the topics such as agriculture and agronomy. The following bibliography contains some of Lazenby's writings:

- Lazenby, Alec (1967). The agronomist and pasture production. Armidale, New South Wales: University of New England.
- Lazenby, Alec; Swain, F. (1972). Intensive pasture production. Angus and Robertson. ISBN 0207124132.
- Lazenby, Alec; Matheson, E. (1975). Alec Lazenby (ed.). Australian field crops: Wheat and other temperate cereals. Angus & Robertson. ISBN 0207128839.
- Lazenby, Alec (1985). The potential of the new species and varieties of pasture plants. Hobart, Tasmania: University of Tasmania.
- Lazenby, Alec (1986). Australia's plant breeding needs. Canberra, Australian Capital Territory: Government Printer. ISBN 0644503181.
- Lazenby, Alec; Matheson, E. (1987). Australian field crops: Wheat and other temperate cereals (2nd ed.). Angus and Robertson. ISBN 0207153906.
- Jones, Michael; Lazenby, Alec (1988). The grass crop: The physiological basis of production. Chapman and Hall. ISBN 0412245604.
- Tow, Phillip; Lazenby, Alec (December 2000). Competition and succession in pastures. CAB International. ISBN 0851997031.
- Lazenby, Alec; Blight, Denis (1999). Thirty years in international education and development: The IDP story. IDP Education Australia. ISBN 0864030223.

Academic offices
Preceded by Zelman Cowen	Vice-Chancellor of the University of New England; 1970 – 1976	Succeeded by Ronald Gates
Preceded by David Caro	Vice-Chancellor of the University of Tasmania; 20 October 1982 – 31 December 1990	Succeeded by Alan Gilbert
