= NSW Premier's Prizes for Science & Engineering =

Australian science prizes

The NSW Premier's Prizes for Science & Engineering, formerly known as the NSW Science and Engineering Awards, are an Australian series of awards for excellence in science, awarded by the office of the premier of New South Wales. There are several categories, the top award being the NSW Scientist of the Year. The 2025 NSW Scientist of the Year is mathematician Nalini Joshi.

== History ==
The prizes, originally known as the NSW Science and Engineering Awards, have been awarded since 2008.

In 2015 the name of the awards was changed to NSW Premier's Prizes for Science & Engineering.

== Description ==
They were established "to recognise and reward the State’s leading researchers in science and engineering for cutting edge work that generates economic, health, environmental or technological benefits for NSW". They also "aim to raise community awareness and appreciation of the important contribution scientists and engineers make to our daily lives and encourage careers in both fields".

== Past prizewinners ==
=== NSW Scientist of the Year ===
- 2008: Martin Green
- 2009: Stephen Simpson, biologist and entomologist
- 2010: Hugh Durrant-Whyte
- 2011: Michelle Simmons
- 2012: John Aitken
- 2013: Graeme Jameson
- 2014: Mark Westoby
- 2015: Scott W. Sloan
- 2016: Rick Shine
- 2017: Gordon Wallace, nanotechnologist
- 2018: Nicholas Talley, gastroenterologist
- 2019: Rose Amal, chemical engineer
- 2020: Edward Holmes
- 2021: Jim Patrick, audiologist and cochlear implant engineer
- 2022: Glenda Halliday, neuroscientist
- 2023: Trevor McDougall, oceanographer
- 2024: Helen Christensen, mental health researcher
- 2025: Nalini Joshi, mathematics

=== Other prizes ===
In 2012, Emma Johnston was named NSW Scientist of the Year for Excellence in Biological Sciences (Plant, Agriculture and Environment).
