= Emma Johnston =

Australian marine ecologist and university administrator (1973–2025)

Emma AO FAA FTSE FRSN
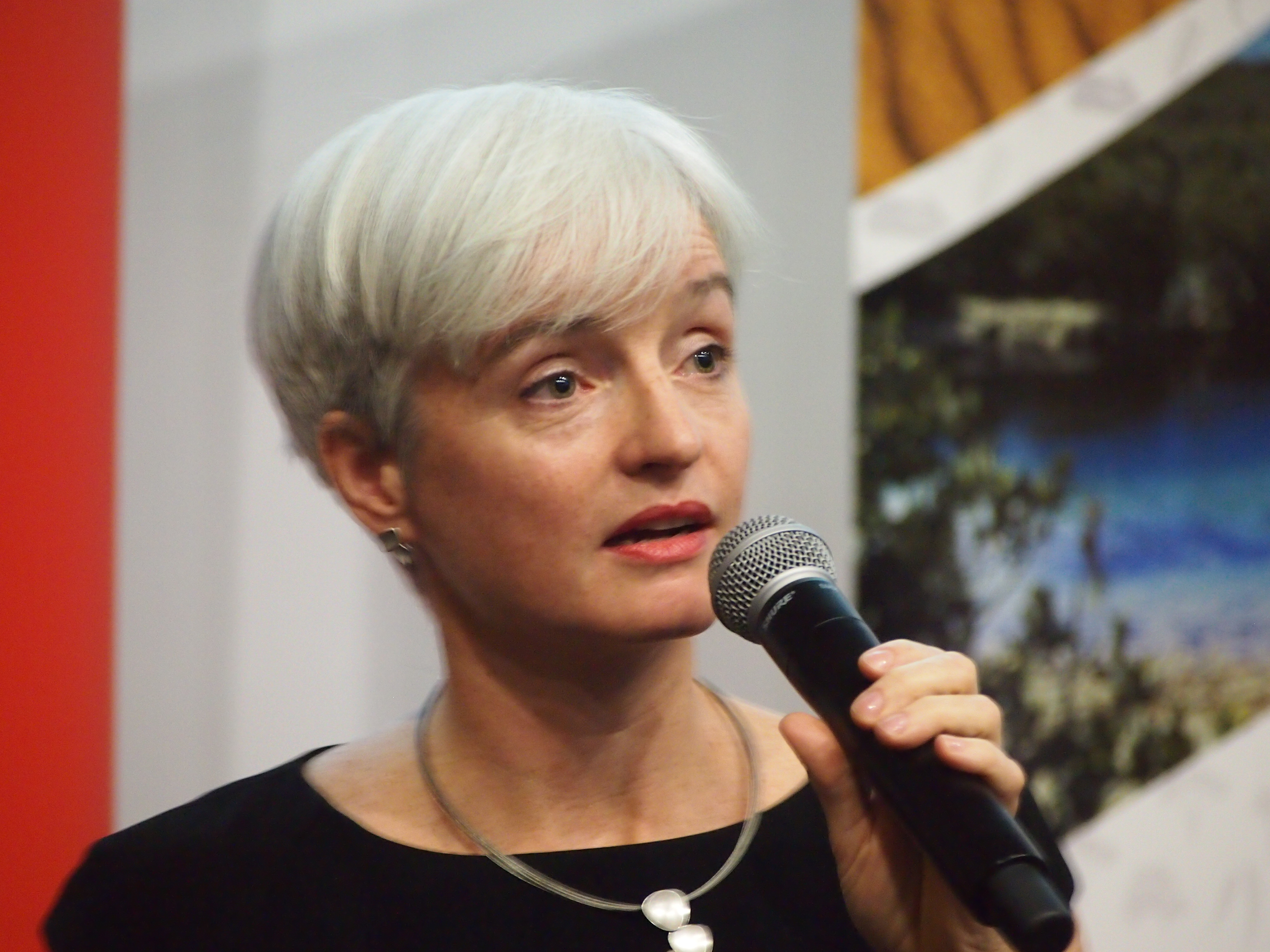
- Johnston in 2016
- Born: 11 June 1973; Melbourne, Victoria, Australia
- Died: 26 December 2025 (aged 52); Melbourne, Victoria, Australia
- Education: University of Melbourne
- Occupations: Marine ecologist; academic
- Spouse: Sam
- Children: 2
- Awards: Nancy Millis Medal for Women in Science (2014); Clarke Medal (2018)
- Scientific career
- Fields: Marine ecology
- Workplaces: University of New South Wales
- Thesis: Effects of Transient Copper Pollution Events on the Ecology of Marine Epifaunal Assemblages
- Doctoral advisor: Mick Keough

Emma Letitia Johnston AO (11 June 1973 – 26 December 2025) was an Australian marine ecologist and academic. In February 2025, she became the vice-chancellor of the University of Melbourne.

Johnston was also the deputy vice-chancellor for research at the University of Sydney, as well as the former dean of science and pro-vice-chancellor for research at the University of New South Wales. She had also been the president of Science & Technology Australia.

== Early life and education ==
Emma Letitia Johnston was born on 11 June 1973 and grew up near the sea in the Melbourne suburb of Williamstown. She spent much time swimming, snorkelling, and sailing as a child. Her father was an applied mathematician with a PhD in chemical engineering from Manchester University. Her mother was a painter with a master's degree in chemistry from Leeds University.

Johnston graduated from University High School in Melbourne. She studied physics and chemistry at high school but not biology. She decided, however, to focus on biology in her undergraduate degree (Bachelor of Science) at the University of Melbourne, which she completed in 1998 with first class honours.

She completed her PhD in marine ecology in 2002 at the University of Melbourne.

== Career ==
Johnston joined the University of New South Wales (UNSW Sydney) as an associate lecturer in 2001. She went on to became head of the Applied Marine and Estuarine Ecology Lab at UNSW. She also led major projects for industry, government, the Australian Research Council and the Australian Antarctic Science Program. She was appointed pro-vice-chancellor for research at UNSW.

She was the inaugural director of the Sydney Harbour Research Program, a flagship research project at the Sydney Institute of Marine Science. She was director of the project in 2012.

Johnston was Dean of Science at UNSW until July 2022, when she was appointed deputy vice-chancellor for research at the University of Sydney.

In February 2025, she became the vice-chancellor of the University of Melbourne.

=== Research ===
Johnston's research group at UNSW investigated the ecology of human impacts in marine systems, combining the diverse disciplines of ecology, microbiology and ecotoxicology to expand fundamental understanding and provide recommendations for management. Her research was conducted in such diverse field environments as Sydney Harbour, Antarctica, the Great Barrier Reef and temperate Australian estuaries.

Among Johnston's significant research findings is the discovery that toxic contaminants facilitate the invasion of coastal waterways by non-indigenous species. Some of her research topics include: determining the major drivers of marine bio-invasions, the vulnerability of Antarctic marine communities, and developing new biomonitoring techniques and informing the development of effective management of biodiversity in Australian estuarine systems.

== Other activities ==
Johnston was a high-profile science communicator, winning the 2015 Eureka Prize for Promoting Understanding of Australian Science Research. She was a regular media commentator, appearing on ABC TV's Catalyst, and was a co-presenter of the Foxtel/BBC television series Coast Australia, which helped take Australian marine science to an international audience. She also launched a Sydney Harbour cruise called Underwater Secrets – Sydney Harbour Revealed, which focuses on scientific research into the waterway.

As a former president of Science & Technology Australia, Johnston was a public advocate for science and for increasing the participation of women in research. In 2016 she co-authored the chapter about coastal ecosystems in Australia's "State of the Environment" report, and in 2021 served among the chief authors.

== Personal life and death ==
Johnston was married to Sam and had two children.

She died in Melbourne on 26 December 2025, at the age of 52, due to complications associated with cancer.

== Recognition and awards ==
Johnston was a 2007 winner of the Australian Institute of Policy and Science's Tall Poppy Award for her research into the effects of introduced species and contaminants on existing Australian marine species.

In 2012, Johnston was named NSW Scientist of the Year for Excellence in Biological Sciences (Plant, Agriculture and Environment) in the NSW Science and Engineering Awards. (Note: "The NSW Science and Engineering Awards were initiated in 2008 to recognise and reward the State’s leading researchers in science and engineering for cutting edge work that generates economic, health, environmental or technological benefits for NSW.")

In 2014, she won the inaugural Australian Academy of Science Nancy Millis Medal for Women in Science. This medal was presented to Johnston at Science at Science at the Shine Dome on 28 May 2014.

In 2015, Johnston won the Society for Environmental Toxicology and Chemistry AU Mid-Career Medal for excellence in scientific work in Australasia that has involved substantial environmental toxicology and chemistry. She was a fellow of the Royal Society of New South Wales (FRSN).

Johnston was made an Officer of the Order of Australia (AO) in the 2018 Queen's Birthday Honours for "distinguished service to higher education, particularly to marine ecology and ecotoxicology, as an academic, researcher and administrator, and to scientific institutes". In September 2018, she was named one of The Australian Financial Review's 100 Women of Influence in the Innovation category.

In December 2018, she was awarded the Clarke Medal by the Royal Society of New South Wales.

Johnston was elected a fellow of the Australian Academy of Technological Sciences and Engineering (FTSE) in 2019, and a fellow of the Australian Academy of Science in 2022.

In recognition of her achievements, her former high school named one of its houses after her.

== Publications ==
During her career, Johnston published 185 peer-reviewed works.

At the time of her death in 2025, her h-index was 65.

== Footnotes ==
Academic offices
Preceded by Duncan Maskell	Vice-Chancellor of the University of Melbourne; February 2025 – December 2025	Vacant
