= Acacia arida =

Arid wattle

Scientific classification
- Kingdom: Plantae
- Clade: Tracheophytes
- Clade: Angiosperms
- Clade: Eudicots
- Clade: Rosids
- Order: Fabales
- Family: Fabaceae
- Subfamily: Caesalpinioideae
- Clade: Mimosoid clade
- Genus: Acacia
- Species: A. arida

Binomial name
- Acacia arida Benth.
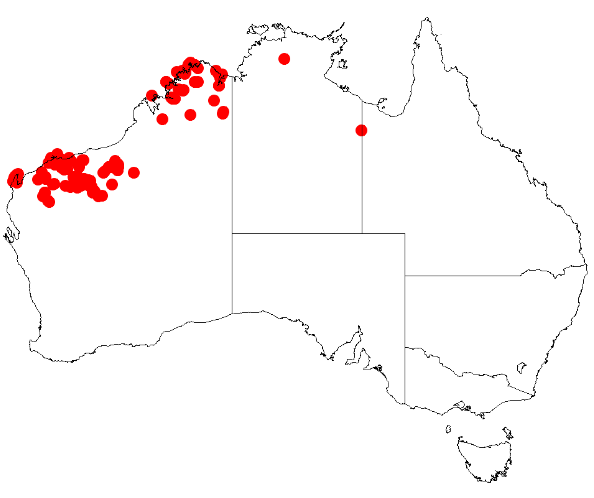
- Occurrence data from AVH

Synonyms
- Acacia subrotata Domin; Acacia trachycarpa E.Pritz. p.p.; Racosperma aridum (Benth.) Pedley

Species of legume

Acacia arida, commonly known as arid wattle or false melaleuca, is a species of flowering plant in the family Fabaceae and is endemic to the Kimberley region of Western Australia. It is a multi-stemmed, glabrous shrub with linear to narrowly oblong phyllodes, cylindrical spikes of golden yellow flowers, and linear pods up to 70 mm (2.8 in) long.

== Description ==
Acacia arida is a shrub that typically grows to a height of 0.9–3 m (2 ft 11 in – 9 ft 10 in) and has a conical shape with the narrower end towards the base, forms suckers and has many stems up to 5 cm (2.0 in) in diameter at maturity. The crown of the plant is dense, with delicate foliage. The branchlets are light brown with brown or yellowish ends. The phyllodes are flat, linear to narrowly oblong or lance-shaped with the narrower end towards the base, mostly 25–60 mm (0.98–2.36 in) long and 1–4 mm (0.039–0.157 in) wide with a sweet fragrant smell when young. The flowers are golden yellow and borne in cylindrical spikes 10–24 mm (0.39–0.94 in) long on a peduncle mostly 4–10 mm (0.16–0.39 in) long. Flowering occurs from February to March or in July and August and the pods are erect, linear to lance-shaped with the narrower end towards the base, flat to circular or more or less square in cross section, mostly 40–65 mm (1.6–2.6 in) long and 3–6 mm (0.12–0.24 in) wide, containing brownish-black seeds 4.5–7 mm (0.18–0.28 in) long.

== Taxonomy ==
Acacia arida was first formally described by the botanist George Bentham in 1842 in William Jackson Hooker's London Journal of Botany from specimens collected "on the parched desert shores of Cambridge Gulf on the north west coast" by Allan Cunningham.

This species is closely related to A. orthocarpa and to A. arrecta. A possible hybrid between A. arida and A. stellaticeps has been collected near Roebourne.

The specific epithet (arida) is from the Latin word aridus meaning dry referring to the annotation on the type specimen.

== Distribution ==
Arid wattle to northern Western Australia, where it grows in red sandy loam or coarse, gravelly, skeletal sandy soils over laterite or sandstone in the Carnarvon, Central Kimberley, Gascoyne, Great Sandy Desert, Northern Kimberley, Ord Victoria Plain, Pilbara and Victoria Bonaparte bioregions. It has a scattered, wide distribution within the Pilbara but generally does not dominate the vegetation. It sometimes form dense stands on many hilltops, called sky islands, particularly in the Hamersley Range and often grows in low, open Eucalypt woodland communities.

== Ecology ==
This species produces new plants from subterranean suckers, including after bushfires.

== See also ==
- List of Acacia species
