= Acacia levata =

Conservation status
- Priority Three — Poorly Known Taxa (DEC)

Scientific classification
- Kingdom: Plantae
- Clade: Embryophytes
- Clade: Tracheophytes
- Clade: Angiosperms
- Clade: Eudicots
- Clade: Rosids
- Order: Fabales
- Family: Fabaceae
- Subfamily: Caesalpinioideae
- Clade: Mimosoid clade
- Genus: Acacia
- Species: A. levata

Binomial name
- Acacia levata R.S.Cowan & Maslin
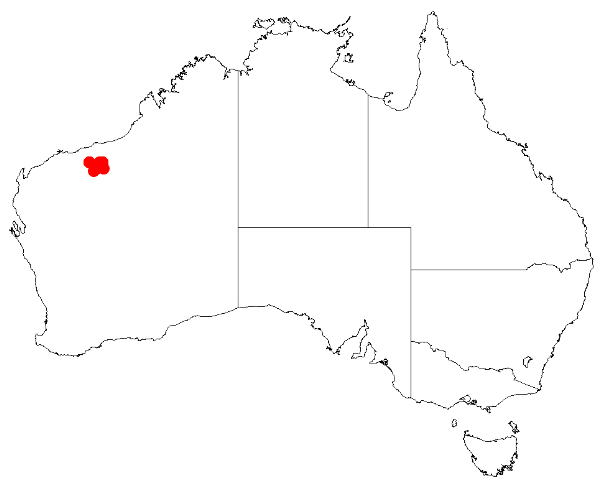
- Occurrence data from AVH

Synonyms
- Racosperma levatum (R.S.Cowan & Maslin) Pedley

Species of legume

Acacia levata, commonly known as woodstock wattle, is a species of flowering plant in the family Fabaceae and is endemic to the north of Western Australia. It is a spreading, multi-stemmed shrub with narrowly elliptic to oblong, straight to slightly curved phyllodes, spikes of golden yellow flowers, and pendent, linear, straight to slightly curved pods with a narrow wing.

== Description ==
Acacia levata is a spreading multi-stemmed shrub that typically grows to 1–3 m (3 ft 3 in – 9 ft 10 in) high and 5 m (16 ft) wide and has branchlets that are normally covered with silky hairs at the ends, or sometimes glabrous. Its phyllodes are narrowly elliptic to oblong, straight to slightly curved, 80–135 mm (3.1–5.3 in) long, 10–20 mm (0.39–0.79 in) wide, thickly leathery and dark green to almost glaucous. The phyllodes have four to six, widely spaced, prominent main longitudinal veins and up to three glands, the lowest 1–4.5 mm (0.039–0.177 in) above the pulvinus. The flowers are golden yellow, and borne in one to several spikes 20–25 mm (0.79–0.98 in) long and 6 mm (0.24 in) in diameter on peduncles 5–12 mm (0.20–0.47 in) long. Flowering occurs in May and possibly to July, and the pods are pendent, linear, straight to slightly curved, up to 150 mm (5.9 in) long, 7–12 mm (0.28–0.47 in) wide, woody and glabrous with a narrow wing, not raised over or constricted between the seeds. The seed are broadly elliptic to almost round, 5.0–5.5 mm (0.20–0.22 in) long and dull brown with an aril near the end.

== Taxonomy ==
Acacia levata was first formally described in 1995 by Richard Cowan and Bruce Maslin in the journal Nuytsia from specimens collected by Maslin, south-west of Marble Bar in 1982. The specific epithet (levata) means 'raised', referring to the strongly raised veins of the phyllodes.

== Distribution and habitat ==
Woodstock wattle is restricted to a small area in the Pilbara bioregion of Western Australia south and south-south-west of Marble Bar where it grows on hilltops and hillslopes in sandy or sandy loam over granite, usually in scrubland and spinifex communities, often with Acacia hilliana and A. stellaticeps.

== Conservation status ==
Acacia levata is listed as 'Priority Three' by the Government of Western Australia Department of Parks and Wildlife, meaning that it is poorly known and known from only a few locations but is not under imminent threat.

== See also ==
- List of Acacia species
