= Mark Westoby =

Australian evolutionary ecologist (born 1947)

Mark Westoby (born 21 September 1947) is an Australian evolutionary ecologist, emeritus professor at Macquarie University, and a specialist in trait ecology.

He is best known for an approach to ecological strategy schemes that arranges plant species along dimensions of measurable traits. This research investigated important trade-offs that govern diversification of strategies of plants in order to understand the similarities and differences across species. Westoby was a leader in the communal effort to compile trait data worldwide, and is currently working on a similar approach to ecological strategies across bacteria and archaea. Earlier in his career Westoby created a state-and-transition approach to managing ecosystem change that has been widely adopted (for example, being mandatory throughout rangelands in the U.S.). He also initiated the linear programming approach to diet optimization under multiple constraints, and the kin-conflict interpretation of the triploid endosperm of angiosperms.

== Early life and education ==
Westoby was born 21 September 1947, in London, England to Florence May (née Jackson) and Jack Cecil Westoby. The family moved to Geneva when he was 4, and subsequently to Rome. He went to boarding school at Caterham, south of London, then to the University of Edinburgh, Scotland to complete a Bachelor of Science in 1970. He then moved to America to undertake a PhD in wildlife ecology at Utah State University, which is where he met plant ecologist and fellow PhD candidate, Barbara Louise Rice (1944–2009). Westoby attained his PhD from Utah State University in 1973; in late 1974 he and Rice married before moving to Australia in early 1975. When Westoby began a lectureship at Macquarie University, Sydney, he started the Macquarie Ecology Group which, over time, became a leading influence in Australian plant ecology.

== Research ==
Westoby's research field is evolutionary ecology. He is most noted for his research on ecological strategy schemes, "trait ecology", the leaf economic spectrum, and the seed-size number trade-off. He chose to focus on plants because they have strong control over terrestrial ecosystems, providing resources and habitat for all the other species present.

The ecological strategies of plants can be understood in terms of cost-benefit trade-offs, with natural selection suppressing strategies that are less efficient or less competitive. Strategy theory aims to arrange plant species in patterns according to their ecologies. It plays a role similar to personality theories in psychology or the colour-magnitude diagram in astronomy.

Westoby began his career researching the diets of herbivores in American arid zones and originated the pulse-reserve paradigm used by Noy-Meir to interpret life-histories in arid zones. His model for herbivore diet optimization under multiple constraints subsequently stimulated the "nutritional geometry" of Simpson and Raubenheimer. His experimental work on plant mortality in relation to growth in crowded stands (the "self-thinning rule"), subsequently has found use in vegetation models. He put forward an interpretation of the triploid endosperm of angiosperms based on parent-offspring conflict and kinship coefficients. This gave rise to the parent-offspring conflict interpretation of genomic imprinting. He proposed state-and-transition language for managing vegetation dynamics on rangelands. This approach is now mandated by Congress for management of US federal rangelands. State-and-transition thinking flowed also into resilience concepts, notably through the Stockholm-based Resilience Alliance which has applied them to boundaries of the earth system.

From the 1990s onward, he carried ecological strategy research into a new phase by shifting focus away from abstract concepts such as "stress" and instead onto measurable traits such as leaf thickness or seed size. This made it possible to express species differences along trait-dimensions. He has also worked on clarifying particular dimensions of ecological variation. For example, leaf construction cost can link to leaf lifespan and nutrient economy and ultimately to plant growth trajectories (the so-called "leaf economic spectrum").

One of Westoby's distinct contributions has been to establish and nurture international collaborative networks. From 2005 to 2010 Westoby led the Australian Research Council Australia-New Zealand Research Network for Vegetation Function which mentored postgraduate students and early career researchers from across Australia and overseas. Over the life of the Network 134 postgraduate students and early career researchers participated in a range of working groups.

Westoby's current work aims for ecological strategy schemes across bacteria and archaea.

== Selected works ==
- Westoby, M. (1984) The Self-Thinning Rule. Advances in Ecological Research (eds A. MacFadyen & E.D. Ford), pp. 167–225. Academic Press. doi:10.1016/S0065-2504(08)60171-3
- Westoby, M., Walker, B. & Noy-Meir, I. (1989) Opportunistic Management for Rangelands Not at Equilibrium. Journal of Range Management, 42, 266–274.
- Westoby, M., Jurado, E. & Leishman, M. (1992) Comparative evolutionary ecology of seed size. Trends in Ecology & Evolution, 7, 368–372. doi:10.1016/0169-5347(92)90006-W
- Westoby, M. (1998) A leaf-height-seed (LHS) plant ecology strategy scheme. Plant and Soil, 199, 213–227. doi:10.1023/A:1004327224729
- Westoby, M., Falster, D.S., Moles, A.T., Vesk, P.A. & Wright, I.J. (2002) Plant ecological strategies: some leading dimensions of variation between species. Annual Review of Ecology & Systematics, 33, 125–159. doi:10.1146/annurev.ecolsys.33.010802.150452
- Wright, I.J., Reich, P.B., Westoby, M., Ackerly, D.D., Baruch, Z., Bongers, F., Cavender-Bares, J., Chapin, F.S., Cornelissen, J.H.C., Diemer, M., Flexas, J., Garnier, E., Groom, P.K., Gulias, J., Hikosaka, K., Lamont, B.B., Lee, T., Lee, W., Lusk, C., Midgley, J.J., Navas, M.-L., Niinemets, Ü., Oleksyn, J., Osada, N., Poorter, H., Poot, P., Prior, L., P'yankov, V.I., Roumet, C., Thomas, S.C., Tjoelker, M.G., Veneklaas, E.J. & Villar, R. (2004) The world-wide leaf economics spectrum. Nature, 428, 821–827. doi:10.1038/nature02403
- Moles, A.T., Ackerly, D.D., Webb, C.O., Tweddle, J.C., Dickie, J.B. & Westoby, M. (2005) A brief history of seed size. Science, 307, 576–580. doi:10.1126/science.1104863
- McGill, B.J., Enquist, B.J., Weiher, E. & Westoby, M. (2006) Rebuilding community ecology from functional traits. Trends in Ecology & Evolution, 21, 178–185. doi:10.1016/j.tree.2006.02.002
- Westoby, M. & Wright, I.J. (2006) Land-plant ecology on the basis of functional traits. Trends in Ecology & Evolution, 21, 261–268. doi:10.1016/j.tree.2006.02.004
- Kunstler, G., Falster, D., Coomes, D.A., Hui, F., Kooyman, R.M., Laughlin, D.C., Poorter, L., Vanderwel, M., Vieilledent, G., Wright, S.J., Aiba, M., Baraloto, C., Caspersen, J., Cornelissen, J.H.C., Gourlet-Fleury, S., Hanewinkel, M., Herault, B., Kattge, J., Kurokawa, H., Onoda, Y., Peñuelas, J., Poorter, H., Uriarte, M., Richardson, S., Ruiz-Benito, P., Sun, I.F., Ståhl, G., Swenson, N.G., Thompson, J., Westerlund, B., Wirth, C., Zavala, M.A., Zeng, H., Zimmerman, J.K., Zimmermann, N.E. & Westoby, M. (2016) Plant functional traits have globally consistent effects on competition. Nature, 529, 204–207. doi:10.1038/nature16476
- Falster, D.S., Brännström, Å., Westoby, M. & Dieckmann, U. (2017) Multitrait successional forest dynamics enable diverse competitive coexistence. Proceedings of the National Academy of Sciences, 114, E2719-E2728. doi:10.1073/pnas.1610206114
- Westoby M, Gillings MR, Madin JS, Nielsen DA, Paulsen IT, Tetu SG. 2021. Trait dimensions in bacteria and archaea compared to vascular plants. Ecology Letters in press. doi:10.1111/ele.13742

== Supervision and influences beyond his own lab ==
Together Westoby and Rice collaborated on research and mentored many early career researchers in the Macquarie Ecology Group. Fifty-two members of the Ecology Group have entered continuing careers in universities or research agencies, both in Australia and overseas.

=== Postgraduate research students supervised ===
Notable postgraduate students of his include David Haig (Harvard), Lesley Hughes (Macquarie University), David Warton (UNSW, who received the Christopher Heyde Medal), Daniel Falster (University of Sydney, who received the Fenner Medal Australian Academy of Science), Michelle Leishman (Macquarie University, who also received the Clarke Medal), Ian Wright (Macquarie University who is also a Fellow of the Australian Academy of Science), and Angela Moles (UNSW, awarded the Nancy Millis Medal).

=== Contributions to research training beyond own lab ===
Between 2001 and 2012 Westoby initiated and organised annual one-day courses for Australian postgraduate students which focused on current research in ecology and evolution. They continue in association with annual meetings of Ecological Society of Australia and attract around 100 research students each year.

From 2005 to 2016, he led and promoted the Macquarie University Genes to Geoscience Research Enrichment Program. This was a federation of labs mainly at Macquarie University that offered 15–20 masterclasses each year for PhD students and postdocs. The success of the program for training life scientists was acknowledged in 2012 when the team running the program with Westoby were awarded the Australian Award for University Teaching for "programs that enhance learning" in the category of Innovation in Curricula, Learning and Teaching. From 2017 to 2019 the program was rolled out across Macquarie University as a broader Research Enrichment Program that bridged into humanities, medicine and cognitive science.

== Awards and recognition ==
- BBVA Foundation Frontiers of Knowledge Award in the category of Ecology and Conservation Biology (2021)
- Elected honorary foreign member of American Academy of Arts and Sciences (2017)
- Inaugural Ralph Slatyer Medal "for outstanding biological research", ANU (2017)
- "Eminent ecologist" virtual special issue of Journal of Ecology (2016)
- NSW Scientist of the Year (2014)
- Australian Award for University Teaching in the category of Innovation in Curricula, Learning and Teaching (as part of team), for the Genes to Geoscience Research Enrichment Program (2012)
- Australian Laureate Fellowship of the Australian Research Council (2011–2015)
- Fellowship in the Australian Academy of Science (2009)
- Clarke Medal for distinguished research in the natural sciences, from Royal Society of NSW (2005)
- Gold Medal for research and postgraduate leadership, from Ecological Society of Australia (2003)
