= Catherine Graham =

Catherine Graham may refer to:

- Catherine H. Graham, American ecologist
- Catherine Graham, Duchess of Montrose, Canadian-Scottish philanthropist

== See also ==
- Katherine Graham (disambiguation)
- Catharine Macaulay, later Graham, English Whig historian
