= Angela Moles =

Australian ecologist, evolutionary biologist and researcher

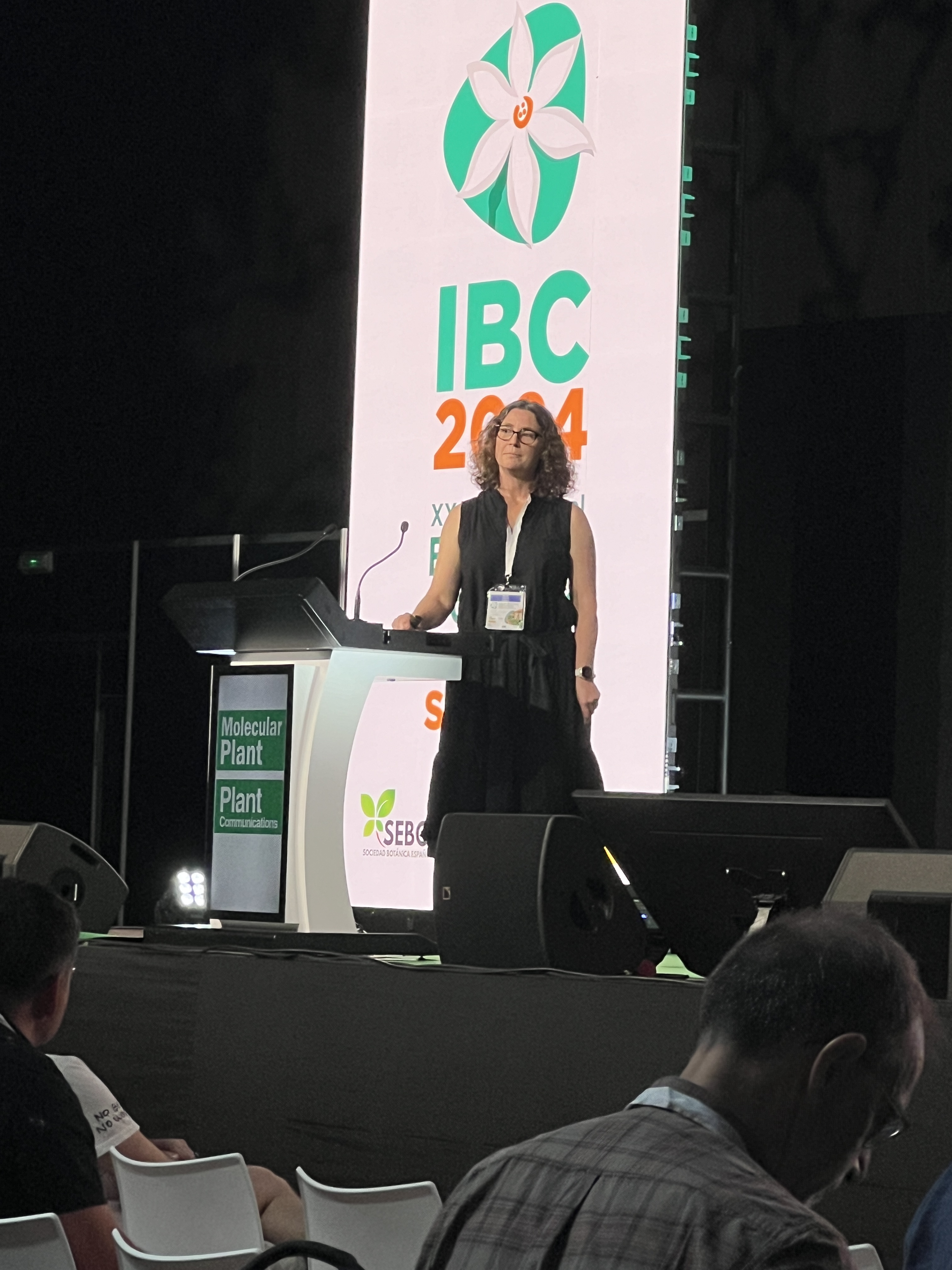
- Moles at XX International Botanical Congress, 2024
- Education: Macquarie University
- Awards: Edgeworth David Medal (2010); Nancy Millis Medal (2021)
- Scientific career
- Workplaces: Macquarie University; University of New South Wales
- Thesis: The Seed Size Synthesis

Angela Tina Moles FRSN is a New Zealand ecologist, evolutionary biologist and science communicator who worked in Australia since 1998. She is professor of botany and ecology and leads the Big Ecology Lab at the University of New South Wales.

== Education ==
Moles graduated from Victoria University of Wellington in 1997 with a BSc. She then completed a PhD at Macquarie University in 2004, with a thesis titled "The Seed Size Synthesis". In 2006 she undertook a postgraduate diploma in higher education, focusing on biological sciences.

== Career ==
On completion of her PhD, Moles remained at Macquarie University where she continued her study of seed size. She moved to the University of New South Wales in 2007 where from her research she concluded that 92% vines worldwide twisted anticlockwise, contrary to predictions that they would follow the Coriolis effect or the sun.

Moles presented "Our Relationship with Weeds" at TEDxSydney in 2012.

For the World Herbivory Project, Moles visited 75 ecosystems around the world and assessed how animals and plants interact. She has also studied the evolutionary changes in plants introduced to Australia.

== Awards and recognition ==
Moles was awarded the L'Oreal/UNESCO for Women in Science Fellowship in and the NSW Tall Poppy Award in 2008. She was awarded the Edgeworth David Medal in 2010 and the Frank Fenner Prize for Life Scientist of the Year in 2013.

Moles was elected a Fellow of the Royal Society of New South Wales in 2017. In 2018 Moles was awarded the Australian Ecology Research Award by the Ecological Society of Australia in recognition of her contribution to "major advances in the development of understanding of global patterns in ecology". She was awarded the 2021 Nancy Millis Medal for Women in Science by the Australian Academy of Science.

== Select publications ==
- Will Edwards; Angela T. Moles; Peter Franks (2007). "The global trend in plant twining direction". Global Ecology and Biogeography. 16 (6): 795–800. doi:10.1111/j.1466-8238.2007.00326.x. Wikidata Q60543442.
- Joanna M. Buswell; Angela T. Moles; Stephen Hartley (2010). "Is rapid evolution common in introduced plant species?". Journal of Ecology. 99 (1): 214–224. doi:10.1111/j.1365-2745.2010.01759.x. Wikidata Q56765108.
- Zoe A Xirocostas; Susan E Everingham; Angela T. Moles (2020). "The sex with the reduced sex chromosome dies earlier: a comparison across the tree of life". Biology Letters. 16 (3) 20190867. doi:10.1098/rsbl.2019.0867. PMC 7115182. PMID 32126186. Wikidata Q89998747.
