= David Lindenmayer =

Australian scientist

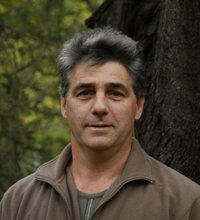
Distinguished Professor David Lindenmayer.

Distinguished Professor David Lindenmayer, AO, FAA, FAAS, FRZS, FESA, FNAS, is an Australian scientist and academic. He is recognized as a conservation biologist and landscape ecologist, with a significant impact on our understanding of forest, woodland, and agricultural ecosystems, and the sustainable management of natural resources. His contributions to long-term ecological research and biodiversity conservation have shaped the field for over 38 years. His work has transformed ecological thinking and influenced sustainable natural resource management policies. Much of this work has helped guide improved decision making for enhanced biodiversity conservation, such as how best to limit interacting fire and logging effects on biodiversity in forests, and how to ensure revegetation programs on degraded farmlands are effective for threatened birds, reptiles and mammals, including under increasingly variable weather conditions resulting from rapid climate change.

David Lindenmayer is a Distinguished Professor (level E3) of Ecology and Conservation Biology at the Australian National University's Fenner School of Environment and Society. As of August 2026 he has published over 1606 scientific works, including 1004 peer-reviewed papers in international scientific journals (including 334 1^{st} authored). He has also published 51 books (35 1^{st} authored), and 132 book chapters (86 1^{st} authored). His research covers a wide array of topics, from forest and woodland biodiversity to landscape and fire ecology, agricultural landscape restoration and conservation, and the importance of long-term ecological research and monitoring. Many of these works are considered foundational texts in these fields. Furthermore, Professor Lindenmayer is among the world's most productive and highly-cited scientists, particularly in forest ecology and conservation biology. As of August 2026 he has a Google Scholar H-Index of 167 with a total of 119,459 citations. He was included in the 2022, 2021, 2020, 2019, 2018, 2017, 2015, and 2014 Clarivate Highly Cited Lists. ScholarGPS rankings list David in the top 0.01% of all scholars worldwide, as 4^{th} most cited in Forest Ecology, Biodiversity, and Habitat, 5^{th} in Conservation Biology, and 219^{th} in life sciences. Between 2004 and 2024, David Lindenmayer was listed among the top 2000 Highly Cited Researchers (h>100) and the 2^{nd} most cited researcher in the field of forest ecology, the 6^{th} most cited in conservation biology, and the 22^{nd} most cited academic in the field of ecology according to Google Scholar Citations. He is consistently ranked in the top 1% of cited scientists in environmental and ecological sciences worldwide and is one of the top 0.1% of scientists across all disciplines having published over 10 peer-reviewed international articles every year for the past 18 years. In 2020, 2021 and 2022, The Australian newspaper listed the 30 leading Australian scientists, and Lindenmayer was listed as the leading conservation and biodiversity expert in the nation.

David’s discoveries are the product of his commitment to long-term research, demonstrated through six large-scale, long-term research programs under his direction (ranging from 21 to 45 years in duration) including the Sustainable Farms Project. These programs focus on the conservation of biodiversity and sustainability across a range of settings, including reserves, national parks, production forests, plantations, and farmland.

His areas of expertise also include environmental management, forestry management and environment, terrestrial ecology, wildlife and habitat management, environmental monitoring, forestry fire management, natural resource management, zoology and forestry sciences, with a particular focus on the critically endangered Leadbeater's possum. His work on wildlife conservation and biodiversity has, for many years, led world research in this area. Lindenmayer's conservation and biodiversity research has been recognised through numerous awards, including the Eureka Science Prize, and the Australian Natural History Medallion by the Field Naturalists Club of Victoria. He was appointed an Officer of the Order of Australia "for distinguished service to conservation and the environment in the field of landscape ecology, to tertiary education, and to professional organisations".

Professor Lindenmayer has recently published The Forest Wars: The ugly truth about what's happening in our tall forests. This book details the destruction of native forests by government corporations and logging industry that has been linked to worsening bushfires worse, killing wildlife and costing taxpayers millions.

== Academic career ==
- 2022: FAAS Elected Fellow of the American Academy of Sciences
- 2022: FRZS NSW Elected Fellow of the Royal Zoological Society of NSW
- 2018-2023: Research Director of the Sustainable Farms Project – a major cross-disciplinary project at The Australian National University that integrates ecological, economic and mental health research to tackle sustainability in Australia’s farming sector.
- 2015-2021: ANU Node Director, National Environmental Science Program. Threatened Species Recovery Hub. Leadership Group member.
- 2019: Elected Fellow of Ecological Society of America
- 2018: Robert H. Whittaker Distinguished Ecologist Award
- 2014: Order of Australia. For services to the environment and conservation.
- 2013: ARC Laureate Fellow, Fenner School of Environment & Society, The Australian National University.
- 2012: Australian Research Council Laureate Fellowship
- 2009: Australian Ecology Research Award
- 2009: Awarded Senior Research Fellowship – Land and Water Australia.
- 2008: FAA - Elected Fellow of the Australian Academy of Science
- 2003: DSc - The Australian National University. Accepted May 2003; conferred December 2003
- 1990: PhD - The Australian National University: "The ecology and habitat requirements of Leadbeater's Possum"
- 1986: DipEd - University of Adelaide
- 1982: BSc - The Australian National University

== Awards ==
- 2026: FNAS - Elected International Fellow of the National Academy of Sciences USA.
- 2026: Elected Fellow of the Royal Society of Victoria.
- 2026: Winner Adrian Gill Award from the Royal Meteorological Society.
- 2025: Winner BOU Godman Salvin Prize. British Ornithological Society.
- 2025: Winner of the Ellis Troughton Medal. The Australian Mammal Society.
- 2024: Macfarlane Burnet Medal and Lecture, from the Australian Academy of Science.
- 2024: Australian Financial Review Sustainability Award. July 2024.
- 2023: Finalist National Banksia Biodiversity Award
- 2022: Winner. Banksia Award NSW Sustainability Award
- 2022: Winner. Eureka Prize for Environmental Research. August 2022.
- 2022: NSW Heritage Award. Highly Commended for Birdcast woodland projection tool.
- 2021: Best in field in Australia award – The Australian Newspaper – Biodiversity and Conservation Biology.
- 2018: Whittaker Award, Ecological Society of America – for distinguished contribution to ecology.
- 2018: Whitley Award for the book Rocky outcrops in Australia.
- 2018: Whitley Award for the book Monitoring threatened Species and Ecological Communities.
- 2018: Whitley Award for the book Recovering Australian Threatened Species: A Book of Hope.
- 2017: Vice-Chancellor’s Excellence Award for Distinguished Contribution to The Australian National University.
- 2017: Whitley Award for the book Wildlife Conservation in Farm Landscapes.
- 2014: Winner of The Australian National University College of Science Award for Excellence in student mentoring.
- 2013: Finalist. Prime Minister's Environmentalist of the Year Award.
- 2013: Jim Pojar Award for the book Salvage Logging and its Ecological Consequences.
- 2012: Whitley Award. Special Commendation Certificate for 2012 for in the promotion of Australia's fauna and conservation.
- 2011: Winner Whitley Award for Ecological Zoology for the book Forest Phoenix.
- 2011: Awarded DL Serventy Medal for Ornithology.
- 2010: Winner of Eureka Prize for Environmental Research.
- 2010: Whitley Award for Zoological Text for the book Forest Pattern and Ecological Process.
- 2009: Winner of Australian Ecological Research Award. Ecological Society of Australia.
- 2008: Winner of International Distinguished Service Award, International Society for Conservation Biology.
- 2006: Winner Whitley Award for Best Conservation Text for the book Practical Conserving Biology.
- 2006: Awarded inaugural Daimler Chrysler Prize.
- 2004: Awarded Australian Natural History Gold Medallion.
- 2003: Awarded Australia’s top innovative thinker in Environmental Science by “The Bulletin” magazine.
- 1999: Whitley Award for Best Conservation Biology text (with Professor Mark Burgman).
- 1999: Winner. Eureka Science Prize. Contributions to population modelling (with Professor Hugh Possingham).
- 1997: Winner Whitley Award for Best Conservation Biology text Wildlife and Woodchips.

== Books ==
Professor Lindenmayer has published over 900 peer-reviewed scientific papers. He has authored 50 books either solely or in collaboration with others, including

- 2026, Paddock trees under threat in south-eastern Australia: Insights for conservation and management, CSIRO Publishing, Melbourne.
- 2024, The Forest Wars, Allen and Unwin, Sydney.
- 2022, Saving the Family Farm, CSIRO Publishing.
- 2022, Natural Asset Farming, CSIRO Publishing.
- 2021, The Great Forest Book, Allen and Unwin Publishing. This book was long-listed by Australian independent booksellers for the Indie Awards.
- 2019, Rocky Outcrops in Australia: Ecology, Conservation and Management, CSIRO Publishing.
- 2018, Restoring Farm Woodlands for Wildlife, CSIRO Publishing.
- 2018, Effective Ecological Monitoring, CSIRO Publishing.
- 2018, Monitoring Threatened Species and Ecological Communities, CSIRO Publishing.
- 2018, Recovering Australian Threatened Species: A Book of Hope, CSIRO Publishing.
- 2016, Wildlife Conservation in Farm Landscapes, CSIRO Publishing.
- 2016, Saving the Earth as a Career: Advice on Becoming a Conservation Professional, Second Edition. Blackwells Publishers
- 2015, Mountain Ash: Fire, Logging and the Future of Victoria's Giant Forests, CSIRO Publishing.
- 2015, Indicators and Surrogates of Biodiversity and Environmental Change, CSIRO Publishing.
- 2014, Ten Commitments Revisited: Securing Australia's Future Environment, CSIRO Publishing.
- 2014, Booderee National Park. The Jewel of Jervis Bay, CSIRO Publishing.
- 2014, Biodiversity and Environmental Change: Monitoring, Challenges and Direction, CSIRO Publishing.
- 2013, Melbourne's Water Catchments. Perspectives on a world class water supply, CSIRO Publishing.
- 2012, Land Use Intensification. Effects on Agriculture, Biodiversity and Ecological Processes, CSIRO Publishing, Melbourne and CRC Press.
- 2012, Biodiversity Monitoring in Australia, CSIRO Publishing.
- 2011, Planting for Wildlife: A Practical Guide to Restoring Native Woodlands, CSIRO Publishing.
- 2011, What Makes a Good Farm for Wildlife? CSIRO Publishing.
- 2010, Forest Phoenix. How a Great Forest Recovers After Wildfire, CSIRO Publishing.
- 2010, Reptiles of the NSW Murray Catchment: A Guide to Their Identification, Ecology and Conservation, CSIRO Publishing.
- 2010, Effective Ecological Monitoring, CSIRO Publishing.
- 2010, Temperate Woodland Conservation and Management, CSIRO Publishing.
- 2009, Australia’s Biodiversity and Climate Change, CSIRO Publishing.
- 2009, Large-Scale Landscape Experiments. Lessons from Tumut, Cambridge University Press.
- 2009, Forest Pattern and Ecological Process: A Synthesis of 25 Years of Research, CSIRO Publishing.
- 2008, Salvage Logging and Its Ecological Consequences, CSIRO Publishing.
- 2008, 10 Commitments: Reshaping the Lucky Country’s Environment, CSIRO Publishing.
- 2007, On Borrowed Time. Australia’s Biodiversity Crisis, CSIRO Publishing and Penguin.
- 2007, Saving the Earth as a Career: Advice on Becoming a Conservation Professional, Blackwells Publishers.
- 2007, Managing and Designing Landscapes for Conservation: Moving from Perspectives to Principles, Blackwell Publishing.
- 2006, Habitat Fragmentation and Landscape Change, Island Press.
- 2006, Life in the Tall Eucalypt Forests, New Holland Publishers.
- 2005, Woodlands: A Disappearing Landscape, CSIRO Publishing.
- 2005, Practical Conservation Biology, CSIRO Publishing.
- 2004, Trees and Biodiversity. A Guide for Farm Forestry, Rural Industries Research and Development Corporation.
- 2003, Wildlife on Farms. How to Conserve Native Animals, CSIRO Publishing.
- 2003, Towards Forest Sustainability, Island Press, Washington D.C. (Co-published with CSIRO Publishing).
- 2003, Australia Burning: Fire Ecology, Policy and Management Issues, CSIRO Publishing.
- 2002, Wildlife, Fire and Future Climate: A forest ecosystem analysis, CSIRO Publishing.
- 2002, Conserving Forest Biodiversity: A Comprehensive Multiscaled Approach, Island Press.
- 2002, Gliders of Australia. A Natural History, University of NSW Press.
- 2002, Tree Hollows and Wildlife Conservation in Australia, CSIRO Publishing.
- 2000, Life in the Tall Eucalypt Forests, New Holland Publishers.
- 1998, Conservation Biology for the Australian Environment, Surrey Beatty and Sons.
- 1996, Wildlife and Woodchips: Leadbeater's Possum as a Testcase of Sustainable Forestry, University of New South Wales Press.
- 1995, The Risk of Extinction: Ranking Management Options for Leadbeater's Possum, Centre for Resource and Environmental Studies.

In addition, Professor Lindenmayer has edited and contributed chapters to many chapters including:

- 2013, Biodiversity and Environmental Change: Monitoring, Challenges and Direction, CSIRO Publishing.
- 2012, Land Use Intensification. Effects on Agriculture, Biodiversity and Ecological Processes, CSIRO Publishing.
- 2012, Biodiversity Monitoring in Australia, CSIRO Publishing.
- 2010, Temperate Woodland Conservation and Management, CSIRO Publishing.
- 2008, 10 Commitments: Reshaping the Lucky Country’s Environment, CSIRO Publishing.
- 2007, Managing and Designing Landscapes for Conservation: Moving from Perspectives to Principles, Blackwell Publishing.
- 2003, Towards Forest Sustainability, Island Press.
- 2003, Australia Burning: Fire Ecology, Policy and Management Issues, CSIRO Publishing.
