= Jane Elith =

Australian scientist

Jane Elith FAA is an ecologist in the School of Botany at the University of Melbourne. She graduated from the School of Agriculture and Forestry at the University of Melbourne in 1977. She specialises in ecological models that focus on spatial analysis and prediction of the habitat of plant and animal species. Following graduation, she was a research assistant and tutor for three years, and then spent the following 12 years raising her children. She returned to the University of Melbourne in 1992 and later commenced a part-time PhD in the School of Botany. She was awarded her PhD in 2002 on 'Predicting the distribution of plants'. Since then, she has been a research fellow in the School of Botany. She is currently an ARC Future Fellow and sits within the Centre of Excellence for Biosecurity Risk Analysis at the University of Melbourne.

Elith is known primarily for her work on statistical models and data, and has mostly focused on species distribution models. Elith is interested in the methods used to model the distribution of species, and focuses on how they work, how to improve them for typical data types and applications, and how to deal with their uncertainties. She is particularly interested in understanding how models work and in finding technical solutions to improve their performance. She is also interested in and contributes to their use for practical applications.

Dean of Science at the University of Melbourne, Professor Karen Day, said Dr Elith was blazing a trail for women in the disciplines of science, technology, engineering and maths (STEM).

She won the 2016 Fenner Medal awarded by the Australian Academy of Science for research in biology. In 2020, she was honoured to be an international member of the National Academy of Sciences.

== Research ==
Elith is currently working on three main topics.

- Improved methods for predicting species' distributions under environmental change, including range dynamics and global predictors for these models – this project is the subject of her Future Fellowship.
- Robust prediction and decision strategies for managing extinction risks under climate change, including integrating dynamic species distribution models with population viability analyses to investigate the impact of climate change on species persistence.
- Robust strategies for restoring aquatic and riparian biodiversity, including methods for quantifying the links between riverine biodiversity and restoration actions, and for evaluating restoration strategies.

"People focus on certain places for their surveys," she said. "Close to town, close to roads or in their favourite places."

However the gaps need to be filled. So Dr Elith uses the available data to make statistical models based on the patterns and known relationships hidden within the data. She also takes into account weaknesses in the data and works to find a more robust model.

== Honours and professional contributions ==
Elith is one of the most highly cited ecologists in Australia and internationally, despite only graduating in 2002. Over the past decade she has become the 11th most-cited author in the field of environment and ecology. In 2012, she was recognised by Thomson Reuters as a highly cited researcher, putting her in the top 1% of researchers globally. She presented her work to the National Press Club (Australia) on May 30, 2012. Only two people from the University of Melbourne were honoured with this award.

Elith was also named in the 2014 Thomson Reuters Highly Cited Researchers in the Environment/Ecology category, awarded to researchers for having an exceptional impact by ranking in the top 1% most cited researchers in their field of study.

In 2015 Elith was awarded the Frank Fenner Prize for Life Scientist of the Year in the Prime Minister's Prizes for Science, and in 2016 was awarded the Australian Ecology Research Award. She was elected as a Fellow of the Australian Academy of Science in 2017.

Her 2006 paper on novel methods to improve prediction of species' distributions from occurrence data, by mid-2014, had been cited about 3,000 times (Google Scholar citations July 31, 2014). Other highly cited work includes her papers on boosted regression trees, her review of methods for spatial predictions, and her work on maximum entropy modeling.

Elith has been a Subject Editor for Ecology (2009-), Diversity and Distributions (2013-), Biological Invasions (2011–2014) and Ecography (2007–2010). She has provided scientific advice to the Murray-Darling Basin Commission, the Australian Biosecurity System for Primary Production and the Environment, the Department of Environment, Water, Heritage and the Arts, and the Atlas of Living Australia. She has won numerous research grants and she routinely teaches specialist courses in spatial modeling.

== Selected publications ==
- Elith, Jane; Graham, Catherine; Anderson, Robert; et al. (2006). "Novel methods improve prediction of species' distributions from occurrence data". Ecography. 29 (2): 129–151. doi:10.1111/j.2006.0906-7590.04596.x. Wikidata Q57014231.
- Elith, Jane; Leathwick, John; Hastie, Trevor (2008). "A working guide to boosted regression trees". Journal of Animal Ecology. 77 (4): 802–813. doi:10.1111/j.1365-2656.2008.01390.x. PMID 18397250. Wikidata Q44583998.
- Elith, Jane; Leathwick, John (2009). "Species Distribution Models: Ecological Explanation and Prediction Across Space and Time". Annual Review of Ecology, Evolution, and Systematics. 40 (1): 677–697. doi:10.1146/annurev.ecolsys.110308.120159. Wikidata Q57062685.
- Elith, Jane; Steven J. Phillips; Hastie, Trevor; Miroslav Dudík; Yung En Chee; Yates, Colin (2010). "A statistical explanation of MaxEnt for ecologists". Diversity and Distributions. 17 (1): 43–57. doi:10.1111/j.1472-4642.2010.00725.x. Wikidata Q57062660.
