= Acacia calligera =

Scientific classification
- Kingdom: Plantae
- Clade: Tracheophytes
- Clade: Angiosperms
- Clade: Eudicots
- Clade: Rosids
- Order: Fabales
- Family: Fabaceae
- Subfamily: Caesalpinioideae
- Clade: Mimosoid clade
- Genus: Acacia
- Species: A. calligera

Binomial name
- Acacia calligera (Pedley) Pedley

Synonyms
- List: Acacia calligera Benth. nom. inval., pro syn.; Acacia calligera Maslin nom. inval., pro syn.; Acacia wickhami var. viscidula F.Muell. orth. var.; Acacia wickhamii subsp. parviphyllodinea Tindale, Kodela & D.Keith; Acacia wickhamii subsp. parviphyllodinea Maslin nom. inval.; Acacia wickhamii subsp. parviphyllodineum Pedley orth. var.; Acacia wickhamii subsp. viscidula (F.Muell.) Tindale, Kodela & D.Keith; Acacia wickhamii subsp. viscidula Tindale, Kodela & D.Keith nom. inval.; Acacia wickhamii subsp. viscidulum Pedley orth. var.; Acacia wickhamii β viscidula F.Muell.; Racosperma calligerum Pedley

Species of legume

Acacia calligera is a species of flowering plant in the family Fabaceae and is endemic to northern Australia. It is a spreading, glabrous, sticky shrub with mostly egg-shaped to elliptic or oblong phyllodes, spikes of sulfur yellow to golden yellow flowers, and crust-like to more or less woody pods up to 90 mm (3.5 in) long.

== Description ==
Acacia calligera is a spreading, glabrous shrub that typically grows to a height of 0.5 to 1.5 m (1 ft 8 in to 4 ft 11 in) and has sticky, ribbed branchlets. Its phyllodes are mostly egg-shaped to elliptic or oblong, often with the lower margin more or less straight and the upper margin convex, 3–20 mm (0.12–0.79 in) long and 2–8 mm (0.079–0.315 in) wide. The phyllodes have five to seven widely spaced veins and a beak-shaped point usually on the edge. The flowers are sulfur yellow to golden yellow and borne in spikes 10–35 mm (0.39–1.38 in) long on a peduncle mostly 5–10 mm (0.20–0.39 in) long. Flowering occurs between February and August and the pods are more or less narrowly lance-shaped and flat sided, crust-like to more or less woody, 20–90 mm (0.79–3.54 in) long and brown to dark brown seeds 3.0–3.5 mm (0.12–0.14 in) long with a narrowly top-shaped aril.

== Taxonomy ==
This species was first formally described in 2003 by Leslie Pedley who gave it the name Racesperma calligerum in the journal Austrobaileya, but in 2006 transferred the species to Acacia as Acacia calligera. The specific epithet (calligera) mean 'callus-bearing', referring to the beak-shaped point near the end of the phyllodes.

== Distribution and habitat ==
Acacia calligera often grows in read sand or clay, or in laterite in shrubland or open woodland with a grassy understorey or ridges, escarpment or plains, sometimes forming dense thickets. It occurs in the Central Kimberley, Dampierland and Ord Victoria Plain bioregions of Western Australia, the Barkly Tableland and Katherine Regions in the top end of the Northern Territory and the Normanton area of Queensland.

== Conservation status ==
Acacia calligera is listed as "not threatened" by the Government of Western Australia Department of Biodiversity, Conservation and Attractions, as of "least concern" under the Northern Territory Government Territory Parks and Walkdlife Conservation Act and the Queensland Government Nature Conservation Act 1992.

== See also ==
- List of Acacia species
