= Australian Ecology Research Award =

The Australian Ecology Research Award (AERA) is an award presented by the Ecological Society of Australia for a specific body of recent ecological work by a mid-career researcher. Initiated in 2008, the AERA was inspired, in part, by the Robert H. MacArthur Award of the Ecological Society of America. The AERA is not restricted to any particular sector, and aims to recognize outstanding ecological research; nominations of researchers from academia, and the public and private sector agencies are invited annually.

The successful nominee is presented the AERA at the Annual Conference of the Ecological Society of Australia.

== Recipients ==
List of recipients is sourced from the Ecological Society of Australia website.

2022: John Morgan
2021: Euan Ritchie
2020: Diana Fisher
2019: Menna Jones
2018: Angela Moles
2017: Richard Fuller
2016: Jane Elith
2015: Saul Cunningham
2014: Melodie McGeoch
2013: David Keith
2012: Chris Johnson
2011: Lesley Hughes
2010: Corey Bradshaw
2009: David Lindenmayer
2008: Bob Pressey
