= Anita Ho-Baillie =

Australian scientist

- Born: Anita Wing Yi Ho
- Education: University of New South Wales
- Scientific career
- Workplaces: University of Sydney; Macquarie University
- Thesis: A novel rear contacting technique for buried contact solar cells (2004)
- Website: Solar Research Group

Anita Ho-Baillie is an Australian scientist who is the John Hooke Chair of Nanoscience at the University of Sydney. Her research considers the development of durable perovskite solar cells and their integration into different applications. She was named as one of the Web of Science's most highly cited researchers in 2019–2022.

== Early life and education ==
Ho-Baillie attended Monte Sant'Angelo Mercy College in North Sydney. She was an undergraduate student at the University of New South Wales, where she studied electrical engineering. She remained at UNSW for her graduate studies, where she developed contacting techniques for buried contact solar cells. After earning her doctorate, Ho-Baillie joined the faculty at the UNSW as a Senior Research Fellow. In 2008, she was one of the team who developed the record-breaking efficiency for a silicon solar cell. The following year they showed a multi-cell architecture comprising the record-breaking silicon solar cell could convert 43% of sunlight into electricity, another world first. She eventually moved to perovskite solar cells, and in 2016 broke the efficiency record for large area devices (12.1%).

== Research and career ==
In 2016, Ho-Baillie was appointed Program Manager for Perovskite Solar Cell Research at the Australian Centre for Photovoltaics. She joined the faculty at Macquarie University as an associate professor in 2019, before moving to the University of Sydney as the John Hooke Chair of Nanoscience. She is particularly interested in the translation of perovskites into real-world devices, including their integration into double-glazed windows.

Ho-Baille was awarded a $2.5 million grant from the Australian Renewable Energy Agency to develop photovoltaics. She has worked to improve the durability of perovskite solar cells. Under stress, perovskite solar cells become unstable and release gas. Ho-Baille has made use of gas chromatography–mass spectrometry to identify the degradation pathways of perovskite solar cells. She showed it is possible to prevent degassing using a low-cost polymer-glass stack, which protects the perovskite solar cells from damage. In 2020, her perovskite solar cells passed rigorous heat and humidity tests. She has demonstrated that all inorganic perovskite quantum dots make for highly efficient photovoltaics, with good mechanical stability.

== Awards and honours ==
- 2001 University of New South Wales Photovoltaics Thesis Prize
- 2016 Lane Cove Council Citizenship Award in Leadership
- 2019 Web of Science Highly Cited Researcher
- 2020 Web of Science Highly Cited Researcher
- 2021 Australian Museum Eureka Prize Finalist
- 2021 Australian Research Council Future Fellowship
- 2021 Web of Science Highly Cited Researcher
- 2022 Web of Science Highly Cited Researcher
- 2022 Warren Prize, Royal Society of New South Wales
- 2024 Nancy Millis Medal for Women in Science, from the Australian Academy of Science
- 2024 Finalist for the 2024 Eureka Prize for Scientific Research
- 2025 Awarded University of Sydney Eureka Prize for Sustainability Research

== Selected publications ==
- Martin A. Green; Anita Ho-Baillie; Henry J. Snaith (July 2014). "The emergence of perovskite solar cells". Nature Photonics. 8 (7): 506–514. doi:10.1038/NPHOTON.2014.134. ISSN 1749-4885.
- Jae Sung Yun; Anita Ho-Baillie; Shujuan Huang; et al. (24 February 2015). "Benefit of Grain Boundaries in Organic-Inorganic Halide Planar Perovskite Solar Cells". The Journal of Physical Chemistry Letters. 6 (5): 875–880. doi:10.1021/ACS.JPCLETT.5B00182. hdl:1959.4/unsworks_35194. ISSN 1948-7185. PMID 26262666.
- Jianfeng Yang; Xiaoming Wen; Hongze Xia; et al. (20 January 2017). "Acoustic-optical phonon up-conversion and hot-phonon bottleneck in lead-halide perovskites". Nature Communications. 8 (1) 14120. Bibcode:2017NatCo...814120Y. doi:10.1038/NCOMMS14120. ISSN 2041-1723. PMC 5263885. PMID 28106061.
