= VicForests =

Australian logging company

VicForests was a Government Backed Enterprise operating in Victoria, Australia. Its principal function was to undertake logging and commercial sale of timber from state forests in Victoria.

== Overview ==
VicForests was a state-owned business responsible for the sustainable harvesting, regrowth, and commercial sale of timber from Victoria's state forests on behalf of the Government of Victoria.

It was created as a state body under Section 14 of the State-Owned Enterprises Act 1992 by the Victorian Government, being declared a state business corporation on 28 October 2003.

It operated within designated areas of state forest that are managed by the Department of Energy, Environment & Climate Action (DEECA). DEECA was also responsible for regulating compliance of VicForests' activities in accordance with the Code of Practice for Timber Production 2014 (as amended 2022) (the Code).

It permanently ceased logging operations on 1 January 2024, following successful legal challenges by several environmental groups. These led to court orders requiring VicForests to reassess its methods of surveying and protection of endangered plants and animals within areas of forest it wished to cut down.

== Contribution to the Victorian economy ==
Proponents of the native timber industry noted its contribution of hundreds of millions of dollars and thousands of jobs to regional Victoria each year.

It nevertheless struggled to return a profit, and relied on subsidies from the Victorian government. One such subsidy was termed in its annual reports as 'reimbursement of foregone income for the Leadbeater's Possum recovery program'. In effect, it was being paid not to log the habitat of an endangered species. Beginning with some $1.5m in 2015, this compensation rose in value every year until it amounted to $11.07m in 2019. In 2020 this subsidy was discontinued, although in this same year VicForests was rewarded with $12m for provision of nebulous 'non-commercial community and environmental services'. This subsidy continued until 2023.

From 2020 until its demise in 2024, VicForests incurred operating losses each year. In the financial year 2021-22, it made $88.4m in sales across its timber operations but had an operating loss of $54.2m. In its financial report, VicForests' CEO stated that its failure to meet supply targets was "largely because injunctions granted in legal proceedings made harvesting in many planned coupes unviable or prohibited harvesting altogether." Also blamed for the loss was the cost of litigation, stand down payments to contractors and compensation to customers.

In 2022-23, with much of logging on hold owing to court injunctions, it lost $60.1m. This is despite reimbursement of $149m from government to cover payments to contractors and customers.

A 2018 study by Forest and Wood Products Australia estimated some 1,639 direct jobs in Victorian native forest logging, and 4,792 jobs altogether, including production and consumption-induced jobs.

== Controversies ==
=== Certification ===
- Despite repeated efforts, VicForests failed to obtain certification with the Forest Stewardship Council (FSC). Its operations were most recently assessed by independent auditors in 2019, but it was found ineligible to join the scheme owing to concerns over old growth logging, threatened species protection and its engagement with stakeholders. Although the audit was conducted independently and before the 2019-20 bushfires, VicForests blamed 'public activism and advocacy' by three FSC directors, as well as bushfires for its failure to gain certification.

=== Fire ===
- VicForests would often burn a logged area, ostensibly to remove woody debris from logging operations. This reduced the fuel hazard to below pre-harvest levels, as well as provide nutrients from the ash for regrowth. However, these coupe burns are controversial, and have been termed industrial pollution with serious health consequences.
- Some studies indicate that logging generally worsens the severity of bushfires in the long term. "Taking timber from forests dramatically changes their structure, making them more vulnerable to bushfires", according to one group of ecologists.

=== Spying ===
- In 2021, ABC News detailed how VicForests had hired a private investigator in 2011 to spy on the activities of a forest protestor, Sarah Rees. VicForests responded to the news report by saying it had "found no evidence to substantiate claims by Ms Rees." A subsequent investigation by the Office of the Victorian Information Commissioner (OVIC) concluded that the agency did conduct unlawful surveillance of the environmentalist, which 'seriously and flagrantly contravened information Privacy Principle'. Nevertheless, VicForests continued to deny any wrongdoing.
- Rees' efforts to gain evidence herself from VicForests through Freedom-Of-Information requests from 2020 onwards were repeatedly thwarted, leading to the Victorian Information Commissioner to conclude in 2023 that the agency had contravened the Freedom-of-Information Act. In response, VicForests argued "it did not need to apologise, and did not accept the commissioner's findings that it breached the law."

=== Logging operations ===
- In November 2021, ABC News alleged VicForests had logged steep slopes in water catchment areas, in contravention of the law. VicForests denied the allegation.
- In November 2022, ABC News showed that VicForests was logging old growth forest, despite a pledge by the state government in 2019 to cease all such logging.
- In November 2022, The Age published a story alleging that areas supposedly protected as Greater Glider habitat were in fact already logged.
- VicForests purportedly regrows all harvested areas with the same type of forest that was originally there. In 2021 ABC News published a report showing many logged areas were failing to regenerate. This led to extra funding by the Victorian government to assist regeneration of logged coupes.
- On 9 and 10 June 2021, Victoria experienced a significant storm event which caused extensive damage across Gippsland, Southern Metropolitan Melbourne, the Dandenong Ranges and Central Victoria. A subsequent major storm event on 29 October 2021 caused further damage across the state. As a consequence, VicForests was engaged by the government to log areas under the guise of salvage logging. This included Wombat State Forest, an area that the government had promised to make into a national park, as well as Dandenong Ranges National Park. Forest ecologist David Lindenmayer remarked on this with surprise: "I've never heard of this happening in a national park in Australia - it's entirely inappropriate."

== Litigation ==
Court action by environmental groups led to the demise of VicForests. These cases generally hinged upon interpretation of the Precautionary Principle, which was a clause in the Code of Practice for Timber Production. The Supreme Court of Victoria defines it here:

The Code requires the application of the ‘precautionary principle’ during planning for harvesting, meaning that ‘if there are threats of serious or irreversible environmental damage, lack of full scientific certainty should not be used as a reason for postponing measures to prevent environmental degradation’. It also requires the identification of biodiversity values during planning and prior to harvesting.

By 2020, VicForests was a defendant in 5 separate legal proceedings. These were brought by the Flora and Fauna Research Collective, Friends of Leadbeaters' Possum, Wildlife of the Central Highlands, Warburton Environment and Kinglake Friends of the Forest. In May 2020, the Leadbeaters' case ended in a legal loss for VicForests in the Federal Court.

The central breach of the Code found that VicForests did not comply with precautionary principle laws in certain forests where Greater Gliders are living, because those logging operations do not avoid serious or irreversible damage to the species wherever practical.

VicForests appealed the decision to the full Federal Court. Out of the 31 grounds on which it appealed, it won only one: the court found that VicForests' logging operations were still exempt from federal environment law under Regional Forest Agreements, even when in breach of state law.

In November 2022, VicForests lost three court cases. One was the Warburton Environment case, concerning the protection of a threatened plant species called Tree Geebung. The other two cases were new and brought by Environment East Gippsland and Kinglake Friends of the Forest (heard together by the court owing to their similarity.) This was about the adequacy of the protection for two endangered possum species, the Greater Glider and Yellow-bellied Glider.

This last case resulted in the cessation of logging operations throughout Victoria in November 2022 until new surveying techniques could be implemented by VicForests.

== Cessation of native timber harvesting and the Victorian Forestry Plan ==
On 6 November 2019, the Victorian Government announced the transition from native timber harvesting by 2030 to a plantation-based sector as part of its Victorian Forestry Plan (VFP).

The phase out would have seen VicForests' total harvest levels maintained at approximately the current levels until 2024, then reduced by around 25% in 2025, and a further 25% from 2026 to 2030.

However, on 23 May 2023, the Victorian government announced that logging of native forests would instead cease on 1 January 2024. The date was brought forward owing to "uncertainty that has been caused by ongoing court and litigation process and increasingly severe bushfires." VicForests ceased to exist on 30 June 2024.
