= Des Hackett =

Australian naturalist

Des Hackett (1925 – 7 August 1998) was an Australian naturalist. He is credited as being the first person to successfully breed in captivity the Leadbeater's possum.
