= David A. Keith =

Australian botanist / ecologist

David A. Keith FAA is an Australian botanist / ecologist who works in the areas of vegetation dynamics, population and ecosystem modelling, and fire. He is currently (September 2020) professor of botany at the University of New South Wales. His work has led to his being a member of the Australian Threatened Species Scientific Committee and the standards committees for the IUCN Red List of Threatened Species and the IUCN Red List of Ecosystems.

Keith was awarded the Australian Ecology Research Award by the Ecological Society of Australia in 2013. In 2017 he was awarded the Clarke Medal by the Royal Society of New South Wales for distinguished work in the Natural Sciences. He was elected a Fellow of the Australian Academy of Science in 2023 and a finalist in the Australian Institute of Botanical Science Eureka Prize for Excellence in Botanical Science in the same year. In 2025 he was awarded the 2025 International Cosmos Prize by the Expo '90 Foundation.

The standard author abbreviation D.A.Keith is used to indicate this person as the author when citing a botanical name.

== Published names ==
- Acacia stellaticeps Kodela, Tindale & D.A.Keith, Nuytsia 13(3): 483 (2001) (2001).
- Acacia wickhamii subsp. parviphyllodinea Tindale, Kodela & D.A.Keith, Fl. Australia 11B: 488 (2001).
- Acacia wickhamii subsp. viscidula (F.Muell.) Tindale, Kodela & D.A.Keith, Fl. Australia 11B: 488 (2001).

== Selected publications ==
=== Books ===
- Keith, D.A. (2017), Australian vegetation (Third ed.), Cambridge University Press, ISBN 978-1-107-11843-0
- Keith, D. A. (2004), Ocean Shores to Desert Dunes: The Native Vegetation of New South Wales and the ACT
- Keith, D.A. (1998), Forest Ecosystem Classification and Mapping for the Eden Comprehensive Regional Assessment

=== Articles ===
- Kodela, P.G., Tindale, M. & Keith, D.A. (2001). "Acacia stellaticeps (Fabaceae: Mimosoideae), a new species from the Pilbara, Western Australia, to Tanami, Northern Territory". Nuytsia. 13 (3): 483–486. doi:10.58828/nuy00353 – via BHL.
- Murray, Nicholas J.; Keith, David A.; Simpson, Daniel; Wilshire, John H.; Lucas, Richard M.; Pric, Samantha (2018). "Remap: An online remote sensing application for land cover classification and monitoring" (PDF). Methods in Ecology and Evolution. 9 (9): 2019–2027. Bibcode:2018MEcEv...9.2019M. doi:10.1111/2041-210X.13043. ISSN 2041-210X.
- Keith, David A; Akçakaya, H. Resit; Thuiller, Wilfried; Midgley, Guy F; Pearson, Richard G; Phillips, Steven J; Regan, Helen M; Araújo, Miguel B; Rebelo, Tony G (2008). "Predicting extinction risks under climate change: coupling stochastic population models with dynamic bioclimatic habitat models". Biology Letters. 4 (5): 560–563. doi:10.1098/rsbl.2008.0049. ISSN 1744-9561. PMC 2610061. PMID 18664424.
- Pausas, J.G.; Bradstock, R.A.; Keith, D.A.; Keeley, J.E. (2004). "Plant Functional Traits in Relation to Fire in Crown-Fire Ecosystems" (PDF). Ecology. 85 (4): 1085–1100. Bibcode:2004Ecol...85.1085P. doi:10.1890/02-4094. ISSN 0012-9658.
- Convertino, M.; Keith, D.A.; Rodríguez, J.P.; Rodríguez-Clark, K.M.; Nicholson, E.; Aapala, K.; Alonso, A.; Asmussen, M.; Bachman, S.; Basset, A.; Barrow, Edmund G.; Benson, J.S.; Bishop, M.J.; Bonifacio, R.; Brooks, T.M.; Burgman, M.A.; Comer, P.; Comín, F.A.; Essl, F.; Faber-Langendoen, D.; Fairweather, P.G.; Holdaway, R.J.; Jennings, M.; Kingsford, R.T.; L., Rebecca E.; Nally, Ralph Mac; McCarthy, M.A.; Moat, J.; Oliveira-Miranda, M.A.; Pisanu, P.; Poulin, B.; Regan, T.J.; Riecken, U.; Spalding, M.D.; Zambrano-Martínez, S. (2013). "Scientific Foundations for an IUCN Red List of Ecosystems". PLOS ONE. 8 (5) e62111. Bibcode:2013PLoSO...862111K. doi:10.1371/journal.pone.0062111. ISSN 1932-6203. PMC 3648534. PMID 23667454.

=== Other ===
- Vegetation Formations and Classes of NSW (version 3.03 - 200m Raster) - David A. Keith and Christopher C. Simpson. VIS_ID 3848, data.nsw.gov.au
