= Vanessa Peterson =

Australian chemist

Vanessa K. Peterson
- Education: University of Technology, Sydney
- Occupation: Senior research scientist
- Known for: Nuclear physics
- Title: Professor
- Scientific career
- Workplaces: UTS; ANSTO; NIST

Vanessa K. Peterson is a Neutron Instrument Scientist, at the Australian Nuclear Science and Technology Organisation (ANSTO). She established an independent research program at ANSTO which specialised on improving understanding of energy systems and how they work. She manages the ECHIDNA program, a high-resolution powder diffractometer, as well as WOMBAT, a high-intensity powder diffractometer. Peterson's expertise includes synchrotron and laboratory x-ray techniques, as well as neutron powder diffraction, as well as single crystal x-ray diffraction.

== Career ==
In 1999, Peterson obtained a first-class honours degree in chemistry at the University of Technology in Sydney (UTS), followed in 2004 by a PhD at UTS and ANSTO, on "Diffraction investigations of cement clinker and tricalcium silicate using Rietveld analysis". She worked as an assistant researcher at UTS before moving, in 2004, to the University of Maryland, Baltimore – working at the National Institute of Standards and Technology Center for Neutron Research. In 2006, she moved back to Australia, and worked at the University of Wollongong, then moving to Australian Centre for Neutron Scattering as the Senior Principal Research and Neutron Instrument Scientist.

Peterson has expertise in materials function and the characterisation of functional materials by using atomic-scale structure and dynamics to material properties. Peterson has worked on emissions reduction technology, and low emissions cement improvements. She leads a group researching energy technologies, including lithium batteries, and fuel cells for cars which use petrol alternatives.

== Science communication ==
Peterson has been involved in a range of science communication across her career, including through ANSTO's Discovery Centre, and National Science Week. She has commented on the chemistry of x-ray structural effects and thermal properties.

== Select publications ==
Some of Peterson's publications can be found at Google Scholar. She has over 8000 citations, and an H-index of 52. Peterson publishes on a wide range of topics, including the physics or materials function, atomic scale structure, and low emissions technology such as lithium batteries.

- VK Peterson, Y Liu, CM Brown, CJ Kepert (2006), Neutron powder diffraction study of D2 sorption in Cu3 (1, 3, 5-benzenetricarboxylate) 2. Journal of the American Chemical Society 128 (49), 15578-15579. doi.org/10.1021/ja0660857
- H Wu, JM Simmons, Y Liu, CM Brown, XS Wang, S Ma, VK Peterson, et al. (2010). Metal–organic frameworks with exceptionally high methane uptake: where and how is methane stored? Chemistry–A European Journal 16 (17), 5205-5214. doi.org/10.1002/chem.200902719
- N Sharma, X Guo, G Du, Z Guo, J Wang, Z Wang, VK Peterson (2012). Direct Evidence of Concurrent Solid-Solution and Two-Phase Reactions and the Nonequilibrium Structural Evolution of LiFePO_{4 .} Journal of the American Chemical Society 134 (18), 7867-7873. doi.org/10.1021/ja301187u

== Awards ==
- 2011 – Eureka People's Choice Awards – Finalist
- 2013 – AIP NSW Young Tall Poppy Award
- 2017 – Sandy Mathieson Medal for "Distinguished contributions to science involving X-ray, neutron, or electron diffraction and/or imaging"
- 2019 – Australian Neutron Beam Users Group neutron award for "Outstanding research in neutron science and leadership promoting the Australian neutron scattering community"
- 2020 – Australian X-ray Analytical Association's Bob Cheary Award for Excellence in Diffraction Analysis for "Significant long-term contributions to diffraction analysis"
- 2022 – Nancy Millis Medal for Women in Science – Australian Academy of Science
