= Tamara Davis =

Australian astrophysicist

Tamara Davis AM FAA
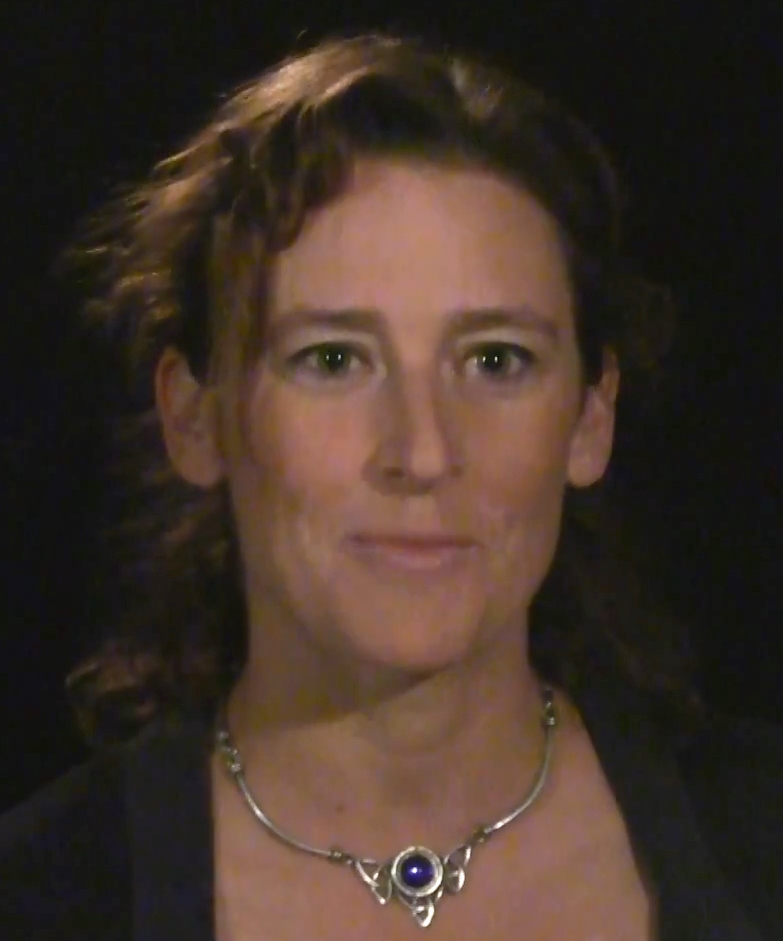
- Tamara Davis in 2015
- Education: University of New South Wales
- Known for: Dark energy, dark matter
- Scientific career
- Fields: Astrophysics, cosmology
- Workplaces: University of Queensland
- Website: smp.uq.edu.au/people/TamaraDavis/

Tamara Maree Davis AM FAA is an Australian astrophysicist that studies cosmology and specialises in the dark energy that is accelerating our universe. Davis is a professor and laureate fellow in the School of Mathematics and Physics at the University of Queensland.

== Awards ==
The Australian Academy of Science awarded her their Nancy Millis Medal in 2015, and she was awarded an Australian Laureate Fellowship in 2018. She received the Astronomical Society of Australia's Louise Webster Prize in 2009, and their Robert Ellery Lectureship in 2021. She became a Member of the Order of Australia in 2020, for "significant service to astrophysical science, to education, and to young astronomers". She was elected a Fellow of the Australian Academy of Science in May 2025.

== Career ==
Davis is the professor in the School of Mathematics and Physics at the University of Queensland. She is an Australian Research Council (ARC) Laureate Fellow, and is Deputy Director of the ARC Centre of Excellence for Gravitational Wave Discovery (OzGrav).

Davis is a media expert and science communicator. She hosted an episode of Australian science program Catalyst titled "Black Hole Hunters" (Season 20, episode 5). It featured Australian scientists hunting down black holes.

As an athlete, Davis has competed for Australia at an international level in Ultimate Frisbee since the year 2000, in both Open's and Master's divisions.

== Education ==
Davis completed her PhD in astrophysics at the University of New South Wales in 2004. She also has a BSc in physics and a BA in philosophy.

== Research ==
Davis is an expert in dark energy and dark matter, and her research includes an array of topics in cosmology such as black holes, supernova, and galaxy expansions.

Davis is also a lecturer, teaching both first year physics and third year astrophysics at The University of Queensland. Additionally, she is an advocate for engaging and welcoming women and people from diverse backgrounds into science, and particularly in the field of physics.

Davis has worked on international astronomical surveys, including the WiggleZ Dark Energy Survey working on mapping the galaxies in the universe. She led the Dark Theme within the Australian Research Council Centre of Excellence for All-sky Astrophysics, and is now leading the OzDES survey.

== Publications ==
- McDougall, H.G., Pope, B. and Davis, T.M. (2026) ‘LITMUS: Bayesian lag recovery in reverberation mapping with fast differentiable models’, Publications of the Astronomical Society of Australia, 43, p. e018. doi:10.1017/pasa.2026.10149.
- Lai, Y.; Howlett, C.; Davis, T.M. (1 October 2025). "Can a multi-tracer approach improve the constraints on the turnover scale at low redshift?". Journal of Cosmology and Astroparticle Physics. 2025 (10): 071. doi:10.1088/1475-7516/2025/10/071. ISSN 1475-7516.
