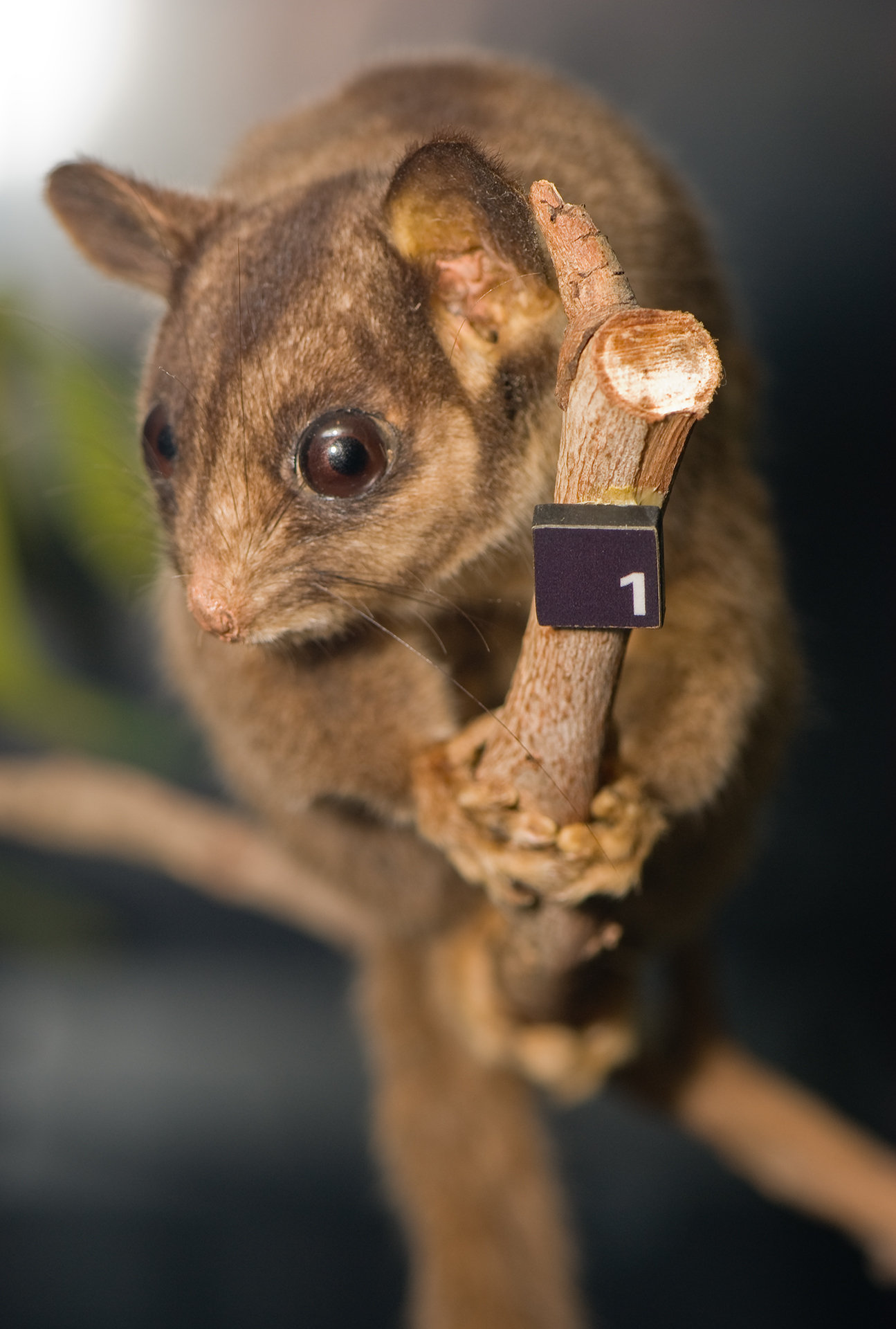
- Taxidermy specimen

Conservation status
- Critically Endangered (IUCN 3.1)

Scientific classification
- Kingdom: Animalia
- Phylum: Chordata
- Class: Mammalia
- Infraclass: Marsupialia
- Order: Diprotodontia
- Family: Petauridae
- Genus: Gymnobelideus; McCoy, 1867
- Species: G. leadbeateri

Binomial name
- Gymnobelideus leadbeateri McCoy, 1867
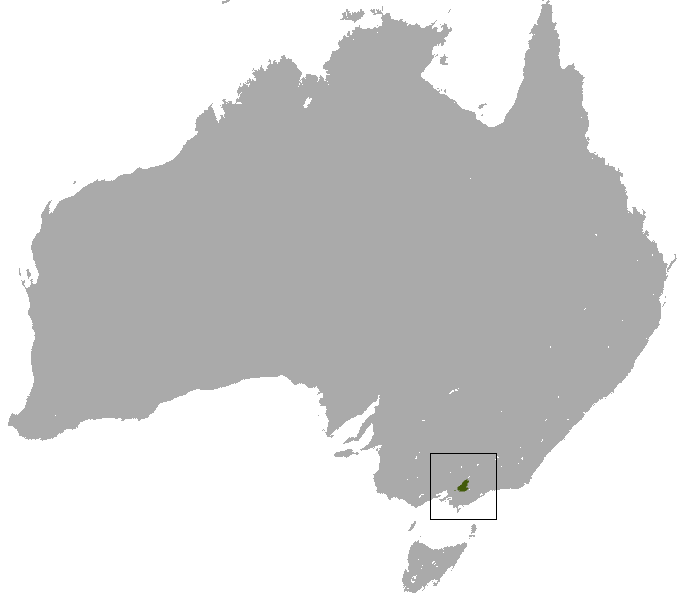
- Leadbeater's possum range

= Leadbeater's possum =

Species of marsupial

Leadbeater's possum (Gymnobelideus leadbeateri) is a critically endangered possum largely restricted to small pockets of alpine ash, mountain ash, and snow gum forests in the Central Highlands of Victoria, Australia, north-east of Melbourne. In June 2025 it was reported that an image of a sole possum was recorded on a camera trap in October 2024 near Yarrangobilly Caves, Southern NSW, within the Kosciuszko National Park. It is primitive, relict, and non-gliding, and, as the only species in the petaurid genus Gymnobelideus, represents an ancestral form. Formerly, Leadbeater's possums were moderately common within the very small areas they inhabited; their requirement for year-round food supplies and tree-holes to take refuge in during the day restricts them to mixed-age wet sclerophyll forest with a dense mid-story of Acacia. The species was named in 1867 after John Leadbeater, the then taxidermist at the Museum Victoria. They also go by the common name of fairy possum. On 2 March 1971, the State of Victoria made the Leadbeater's possum its faunal emblem.

== History ==
Leadbeater's possum is thought to have evolved about 20 million years ago. It was not discovered until 1867 and was originally known only through five specimens, the last one collected in 1909. From that time on, the fear that it might be extinct gradually grew into near-certainty after the swamps and wetlands in Australia around Bass River in south-west Gippsland were drained for farming in the early 1900s.

By the time of the 1939 Black Friday fires, the species was thought to have been extinct. Then, on 3 April 1961, a member of the species was rediscovered by naturalist Eric Wilkinson in the forests near Cambarville, and the first specimen in more than 50 years was captured later in the month.

In 1961, a colony was discovered near Marysville. Extensive searches since then have found the existing population in the highlands. However, the availability of suitable habitat is critical: forest must be neither too old nor too young, with conservation efforts for Leadbeater's possum involving protection of remaining old-growth stands, and maintenance of younger stands that are allowed to attain hollow-bearing age.

The combination of 40-year-old regrowth (for food) and large dead trees left still standing after the fires (for shelter and nesting) allowed the Leadbeater's possum population to expand to an estimated peak of about 7500 in the early 1980s. From its peak in the 1980s, the Leadbeater's possum population was expected to further decline rapidly, by as much as 90%, due to a habitat bottleneck. The population has dropped sharply since 1996. Particularly, the February 2009 Black Saturday bushfires destroyed 43% of Leadbeater's possums' habitat in the Central Highlands, halving the wild population to 1,500. A study in 2014 concluded there is a 92% chance the Leadbeater's ecosystem in the Victoria central highlands will collapse within 50 years.

== Habits ==
Leadbeater's possums are rarely seen as they are nocturnal, fast-moving, and occupy the upper story of some of the tallest forest trees in the world. They have an average body length of 33 cm (13 inches) with the tail included. They live in small family colonies of up to 12 individuals, including one monogamous breeding pair. Mating occurs only once a year, with a maximum of two joeys being born to each pair. All members sleep together in a nest made out of shredded bark in a tree hollow, anywhere from 6 to 30 metres above ground level and roughly in the centre of a territory of 3 hectares, which they defend actively. The society of Leadbeater's possums is matriarchal: each group is dominated by only one female Leadbeater's possum that is active in expelling outsiders. Other juvenile females are weaned off before they reach sexual maturity. In addition, female Leadbeater's possums are more aggressive in nature, often engaging in frequent fights with other females, including their own daughters. Due to the constant attacks, young females are forced to leave much earlier than their male brothers, which results in the extremely high male to female ratio of 3:1.

Solitary Leadbeater's possums have difficulty surviving: when young males disperse at about 15 months of age, they tend either to join another colony as a supernumerary member, or to gather together into bachelor groups while they wait to find a mate.

At dusk, Leadbeater's possums emerge from the nest and spread out to forage in the sub-canopy, often making substantial leaps from tree to tree (they require continuous understory to travel). Their diet is omnivorous: feeding on a range of wattle saps and exudates, lerps, and a high proportion of arthropods which they find under the loose bark of eucalypts, including spiders, crickets, termites and beetles. Plant exudates make up 80% of their energy intake, but the protein provided by the arthropods is essential for successful breeding.

Births are usually timed for the beginning of winter (May and June) or late spring (October and November). Most litters are of one or two young, which stay in the pouch for 80 to 90 days, and first emerge from the nest following this. Young, newly independent Leadbeater's possums are very vulnerable to owls.

As of 2013, Leadbeater's possums are found in three habitat types: lowland swamp gum, of Yellingbo Nature Conservation Reserve; montane ash forest, wet sclerophyll forest dominated by mountain ash, shining gum and alpine ash with a dense mid-story of acacia species; sub-alpine woodlands of Mount Baw Baw, Lake Mountain and Mount Bullfight.

== Threats ==
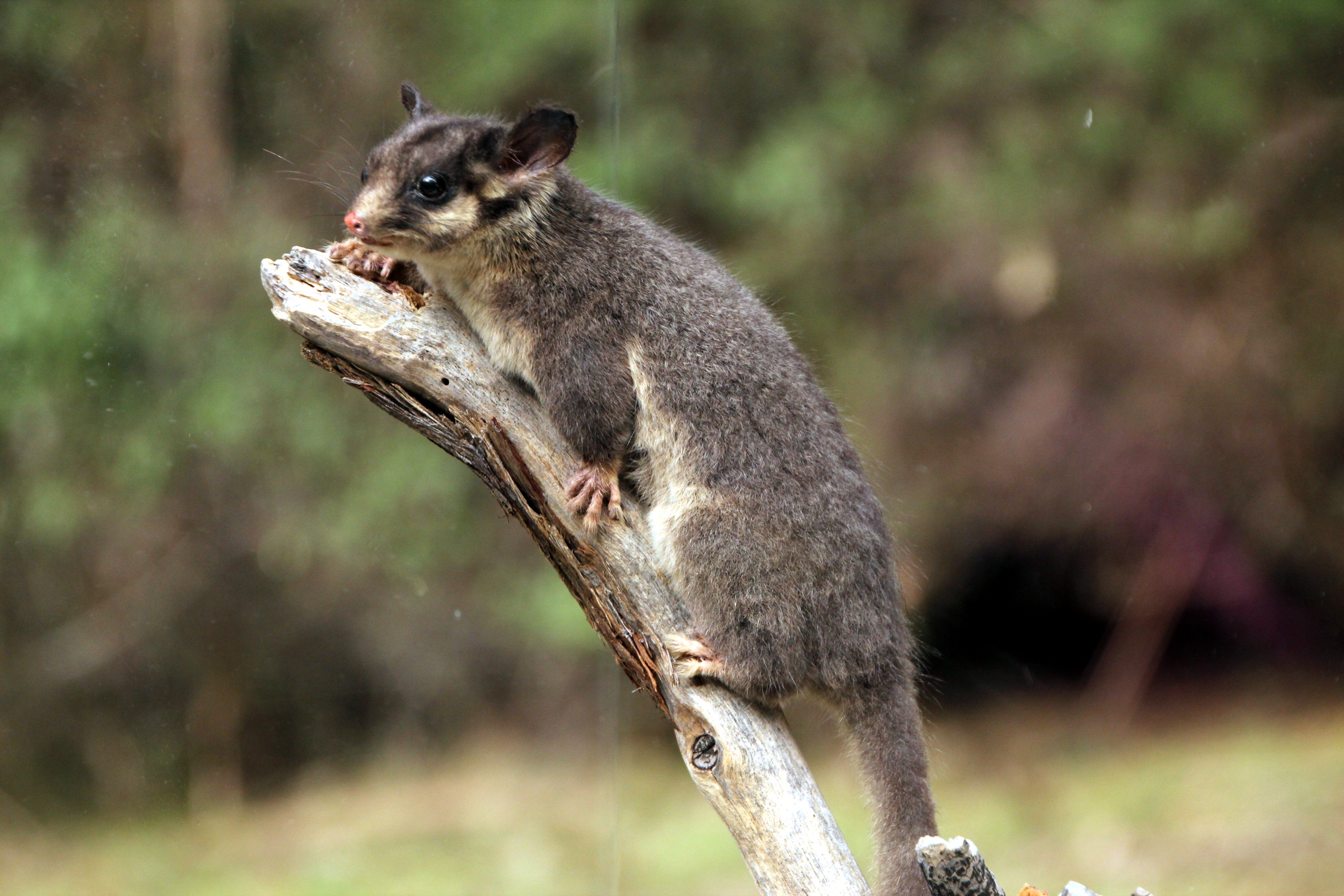
George, a taxidermied male Leadbeater's possum (Gymnobelideus leadbeateri), that Friends of Leadbeater's Possum uses for its educational work concerning this threatened species.

Leadbeater's possums and their forest habitat have been the subject of the largest longitudinal study of any species in the world—conducted by David Lindenmayer, a professor at the Australian National University, and his research assistants since 1983. Hundreds of peer reviewed scientific papers, journal articles and books have resulted from the years of data collection by the ANU team. Their findings show that the availability of suitable habitat is critical: forest must be neither too old nor too young, with conservation efforts for Leadbeater's possums involving protection of remaining old-growth stands, and maintenance of younger stands that are allowed to attain hollow-bearing age. Clearfell logging and salvage logging (after bushfires) have been proven by the researchers to have been the greatest threat to the possums' conservation in the wild over the last three decades of the 20th century.

=== Habitat loss ===
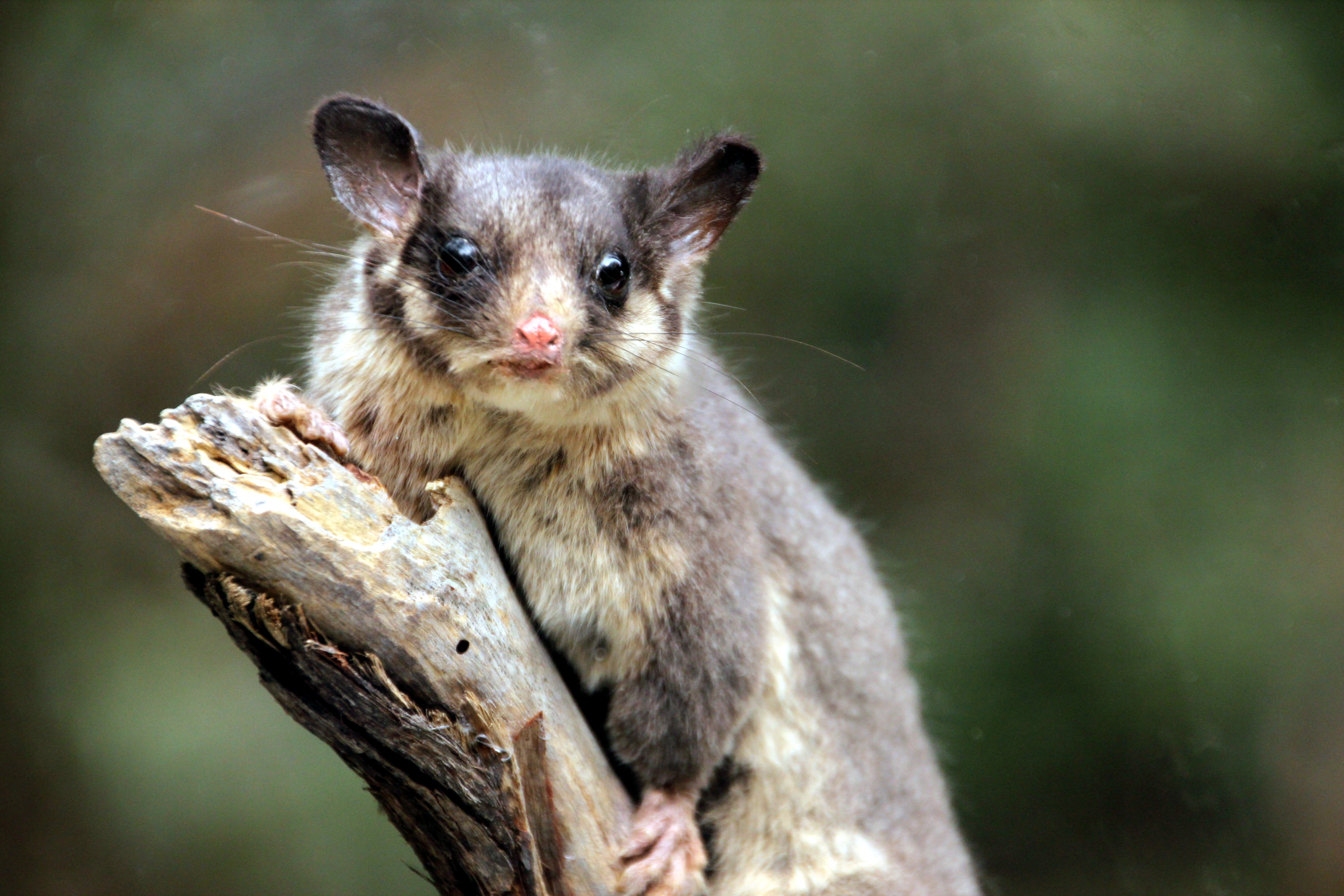
George was found dead but intact on the side of a logging road about 2011 in the Victorian Central Highlands. It is assumed that George's home in the mountain ash (Eucalyptus regnans) forests was a victim of logging, and as his home was being carted away he fell off the logging truck.

The entire Central Highlands population distribution is confined to a 70 by 80 kilometre area. With 43% of its known Central Highlands habitat destroyed in the bushfires of February 2009 – large areas of forest around Toolangi, Marysville, Narbethong, Cambarville and Healesville – the species' status is currently in doubt. Consequently, in December 2012, David Lindenmayer and Zoos Victoria's threatened species biologist, Dan Harley, submitted an application to the federal government for a revision of the species status, providing evidence that it should be relisted as critically endangered. The then minister for the environment, Tony Burke, agreed with the nomination and forwarded the application to the scientific committee of the EPBC Act requesting urgent consideration. On 22 April 2015, it was decided to relist the species as critically endangered.

The only remaining population outside the Central Highlands is located at Yellingbo Nature Conservation Reserve. Harley has estimated this population to be fewer than 50.

=== Logging ===
As the species is endangered and occupies a restricted range, logging continues to pose a critical threat to the Leadbeater's possum. The logging in 1993 of "much of the possum's habitat, known as zone one" a five hectare reserve east of Powelltown, followed a "mapping error". Author Peter Preuss stated that the possum's population faltered in 1997 with current habitat (limited to a 50-square-kilometre area) under threat from logging. He emphasised the need to relaunch a breeding program.

Despite a joint federal and state government plan to save it, since the 1980s, the Leadbeater's possum population halved to around 2000 even before the Black Saturday fires. Many more were killed early in 2007 when the government-backed enterprise company, VicForests, bulldozed large firebreaks through Leadbeater's monitoring stations following the Christmas fires – firebreaks and clear-felling also prevent breeding with nearby colonies.

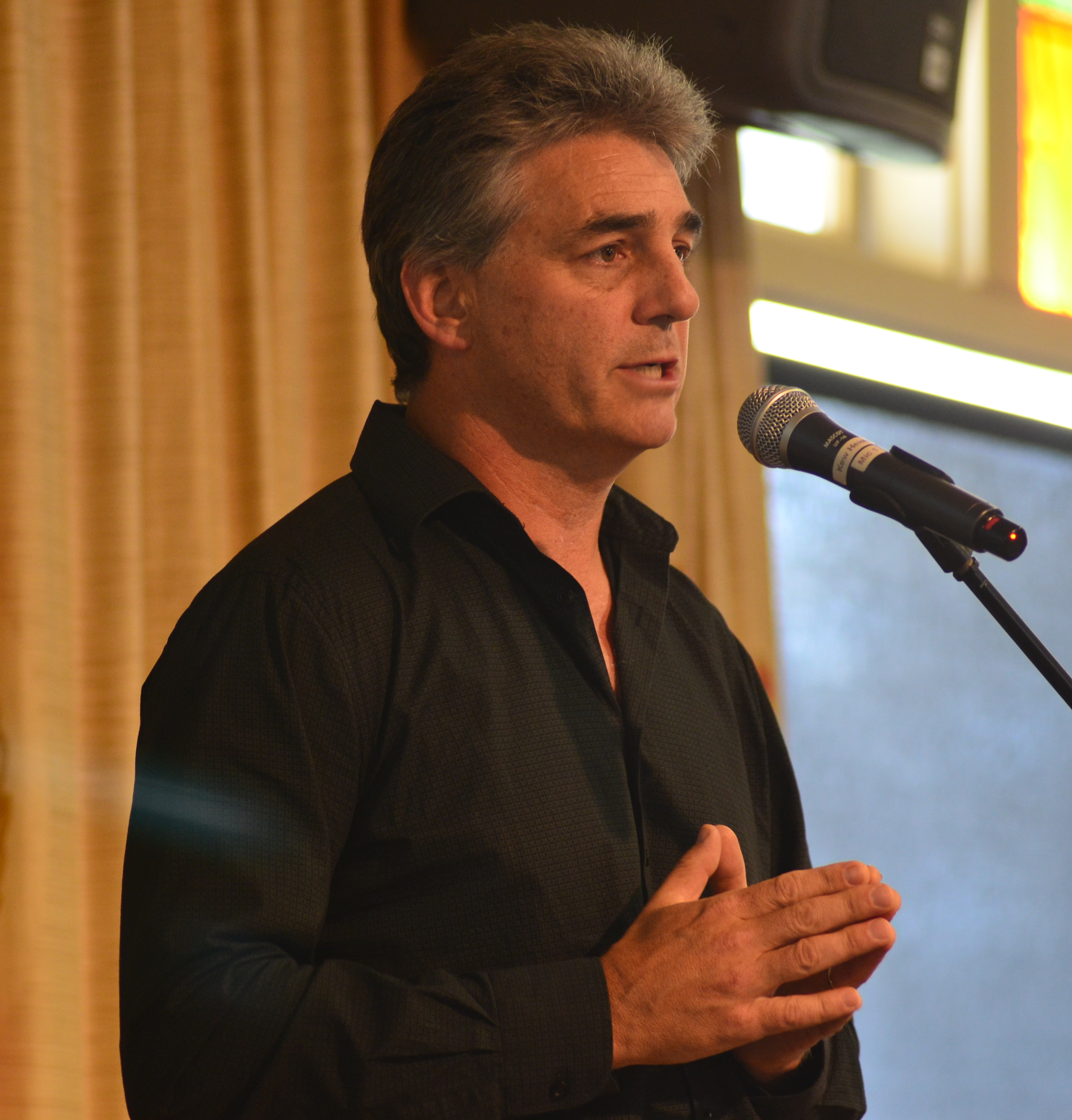
David Lindenmayer talking about the preservation of the Leadbeater's possum in Melbourne

David Lindenmayer (Australian National University) has argued that the need for nest boxes indicates that logging practices are not ecologically sustainable for conserving hollow-dependent species like the Leadbeater's possum. Studies have shown that clear-felling operations, such as the logging run in state forest between the Yarra Ranges National Park and Mount Bullfight Conservation Reserve in February 2006, led to the deaths of most possums in the area—"Adult animals have a strong affinity with their home range and are reluctant to move".

Salvage logging since the fires has posed a further risk to this extremely diminished population with clear-felling also approved by VicForests in the few remaining unburnt areas, such as the Kalatha Creek area of Toolangi State Forest in 2010, a move opposed by the Yarra Ranges Shire Council.

In 2012 MyEnvironment challenged VicForests' operations in three planned coupes in the Toolangi forest in the supreme court. The basis of their claim being that "VicForests did not undertake adequate pre-logging surveys prior to logging in an area that we claim meets Leadbeater's habitat and therefore should not have been logged." The proposed logging is to supply (taxpayer subsidised) pulp to manufacture 'Reflex' copy paper—a product of Australian Paper owned by the Japanese company, Nippon Paper Group. During the case, film was recorded of a Leadbeater's possum in the contested coupe area. The case was lost by MyEnvironment due to inconsistencies in the wording of the Leadbeater's Possum Action Statement (10 years out of date) and the forestry prescriptions adhered to by VicForests. The group immediately appealed the decision by the presiding judge Justice Osborne, and the supreme court accepted there was a sound basis for an appeal to the original determination. A supreme court appeal was heard on 24 June 2013 before three judges and MyEnvironment was represented in court by Julian Burnside QC. The appeal was lost.

=== Feral cats ===
Previously feral cats had only been considered a peripheral threat to Leadbeater's possums, but recent research has found video evidence of cats preying on possums leaving nesting boxes, and of possum remains in stomach contents of trapped feral cats. It is now considered that cats may be a more significant threat to possum populations, particularly in areas already disturbed by logging or bushfires.

=== Legislation ===
On 27 June 2013 the Napthine led State government passed legislative changes to allow VicForests access to Victoria's forests for the next 25 years and to be self monitoring (this follows the success of other recent cases preventing logging of remaining possum habitat). According to The Wilderness Society, "the Victorian government ... [is] virtually signing the death warrant of the remaining 500 or so Leadbeater's possums." These changes to the Sustainable Forests (Timber) Act 2004 will have implications not only for the Leadbeater's possum but to the biodiversity, carbon storage and water catchments of the forests.

== Conservation ==
On 22 April 2015, Greg Hunt, the Minister for the Environment, announced that the Leadbeater's possum would be listed as a "critically endangered" species under the EPBC Act.

The forestry industry and Barnaby Joyce advocated for the Leadbeater's possum to be taken off the critically endangered list. Following uproar from the logging industry & the National Party it was soon placed under re-assessment. On the eve of an ABC 4 Corner episode on "Extinction" (24 June 2019) the then Environment Minister, Sussan Ley announced that it would be re-listed as "critically endangered".

Of its ash forest habitat, about 30% is protected, while the rest is allocated to logging.

In addition there is a small isolated, genetically distinct, population protected within the Yellingbo Nature Conservation Reserve. This lowland habitat consist primarily of Sedge-rich Eucalyptus camphora Swamp.

In 2013 it was proposed to create the "Great Forest National Park" to protect the mountain ash forest habitat. The park would protect the area between Kinglake, Baw Baw and Eildon national parks, which is also important for Melbourne's drinking water and as a carbon sink.

Since 2004, the Friends of Leadbeater's Possum community group has been active in raising the animal's profile and lobbying for its conservation.

Through a joint community/government program, "Project Possum" has installed approximately 200 plastic nest boxes in the wild. Many of these nest boxes were paid for by a community fundraising campaign. The nest boxes are primarily used to assist with ongoing population monitoring and supplement the declining forest habitat. Project Possum has targeted two forest types: montane ash forest (i.e. Mt Ritchie, Dowey Spur, Ben Cairn) and sub-alpine woodland (i.e. Mount Baw Baw, Lake Mountain, and Mount Bullfight). The nest boxes are routinely checked for habitation every one or two years. Nest boxes located in the sub-alpine woodland tend to have a high uptake, while those located in montane ash forest have very limited uptake. An additional 50 nest boxes are due for installation in 2015–16.

=== Captive breeding ===
Des Hackett is credited as the first person to successfully breed the Leadbeater's possum in captivity. In May 2006, the last Australian specimen at the time, held at Healesville Sanctuary, died. In January 2010, Kasia, at the time the last captive Leadbeater's possum worldwide, died at Toronto Zoo. The predation in early 2012 by a feral cat of the few Lake Mountain Leadbeater's possums remaining after the 2009 bushfire led to three remaining individuals being taken into captivity for their own protection. One animal has since died. There are no plans to release the remaining two animals despite a further two colonies of Leadbeater's possums having recently been located at Lake Mountain in remnant gully vegetation. These two Lake Mountain animals are now on public display in the Nocturnal House as ambassadors for the species. Healesville Sanctuary's captive breeding program for Leadbeater's possums recommenced in May 2012 and now comprises 6 individuals from the genetically distinct Yellingbo population. As of May 2015, they are housed as pairs in large enclosures off display, but are yet to breed.

== See also ==
- Close relatives of Leadbeater's possum are the sugar glider, squirrel glider, yellow-bellied glider, mahogany glider and striped possum.
- Goblin flea, an insect which only lives on Leadbeater's possum.
