= Sarah-Jane Dawson =

Australian clinician-scientist

Sarah-Jane Dawson FAHMS

Personal details
- Occupation: Oncologist

Sarah-Jane Dawson is an Australian clinician-scientist. She is a consultant medical oncologist and head of the Molecular Biomarkers and Translational Genomics Laboratory at the Peter MacCallum Cancer Centre in Melbourne. Her current research interests are focused on the development of noninvasive blood-based biomarkers ('liquid biopsies') for clinical application, including early detection, risk stratification and disease monitoring in cancer management.

== Education ==
Dawson obtained her medical degree from the University of Melbourne in 1998, and trained as a medical oncologist in Melbourne, Australia. She completed her PhD at the University of Cambridge and performed postdoctoral studies at the Cambridge Research Institute, UK. She returned to Melbourne in 2014 to lead a research laboratory at the Peter MacCallum Cancer Centre.

== Scientific profile ==
Dawson has international recognition for her contributions to translational cancer research. A major focus of her current research involves the study of cell-free circulating tumour DNA in patients with cancer. Many cancers shed small amounts of DNA (called circulating tumour DNA) into the patient's bloodstream which can be measured for clinical applications in cancer management. Dawson's recent research has shown the application of circulating tumour DNA testing for disease monitoring in various cancer types. She has received ongoing support from high-profile Australian organisations including the National Health and Medical Research Council (NHMRC), National Breast Cancer Foundation, Leukaemia and Lymphoma Society and Australian Cancer Research Foundation. Dawson works with her husband Professor Mark Dawson and the clinician team to develop a simple blood test which is a liquid biopsy to monitor blood cancers and it is the alternative way to the traditional biopsies which can be invasive bone marrow or lymph node tissue biopsies. Sarah-Jane with her husband Prof. Dawson and the clinician team have also identified the evidence that the cancer stem cells develops resistance to therapies which helps the development of the effectiveness of new drugs.

== Awards ==
- Elected Fellow of the Australian Academy of Health and Medical Sciences, 2020
- Awarded inaugural AAHMS Jian Zhou Medal, 2020
- Awarded Nancy Millis Medal for Women in Science, 2026
- Awarded CSL Centenary Fellow, 2018

== Selected publications ==
2013 Dawson SJ, Tsui D, Murtaza M, Biggs, H, Rueda OM, Chin, SF, Dunning MJ, Gale, D, Forshew T, Mahler-Araujo B, Rajan S, Humphray S, Becq J, Halshall D, Wallis M, Bentley D, Caldas C, Rosenfeld N. Analysis of Circulating Tumor DNA to Monitor Metastatic Breast Cancer. March 28, 2013; 368:1199-1209.
