= Nancy Millis Medal for Women in Science =

Australian science award for women

The Nancy Millis Medal for Women in Science, also known as the Nancy Millis Medal, is an annual award conferred by the Australian Academy of Science. It is named in honour of the microbiologist Nancy Millis (1922–2012) and recognises women scientists, with eight to 15 years' experience after completing their PhD, for their outstanding contribution to research and leadership.

== Winners ==
The medal was first awarded in 2014 and annually since:

- 2014: Emma Johnston
- 2015: Tamara Davis
- 2016: Elena Belousova
- 2017: Kerrie Ann Wilson
- 2018: Marie-Liesse Asselin-Labat
- 2019: Jacqueline Batley
- 2020: Kate Schroder and Nicole Bell
- 2021: Angela Moles and Cathryn Trott
- 2022: Vanessa Peterson
- 2023: Renae Ryan
- 2024: Anita Ho-Baillie
- 2025: Natasha Hurley-Walker
- 2026: Sarah-Jane Dawson
