= Katherine Graham =

Katherine Graham may refer to:

- Katherine Graham (golfer)
- Katherine Graham Peden
- Katharine Graham, publisher of the Washington Post
