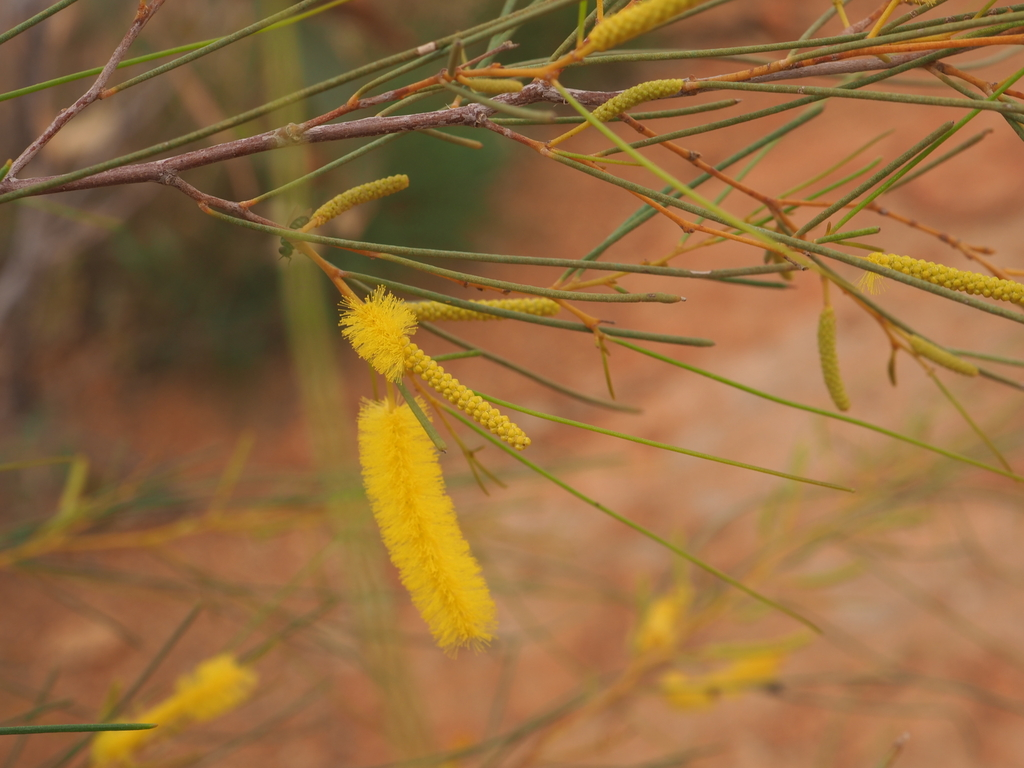

Scientific classification
- Kingdom: Plantae
- Clade: Tracheophytes
- Clade: Angiosperms
- Clade: Eudicots
- Clade: Rosids
- Order: Fabales
- Family: Fabaceae
- Subfamily: Caesalpinioideae
- Clade: Mimosoid clade
- Genus: Acacia
- Species: A. orthocarpa

Binomial name
- Acacia orthocarpa F.Muell.
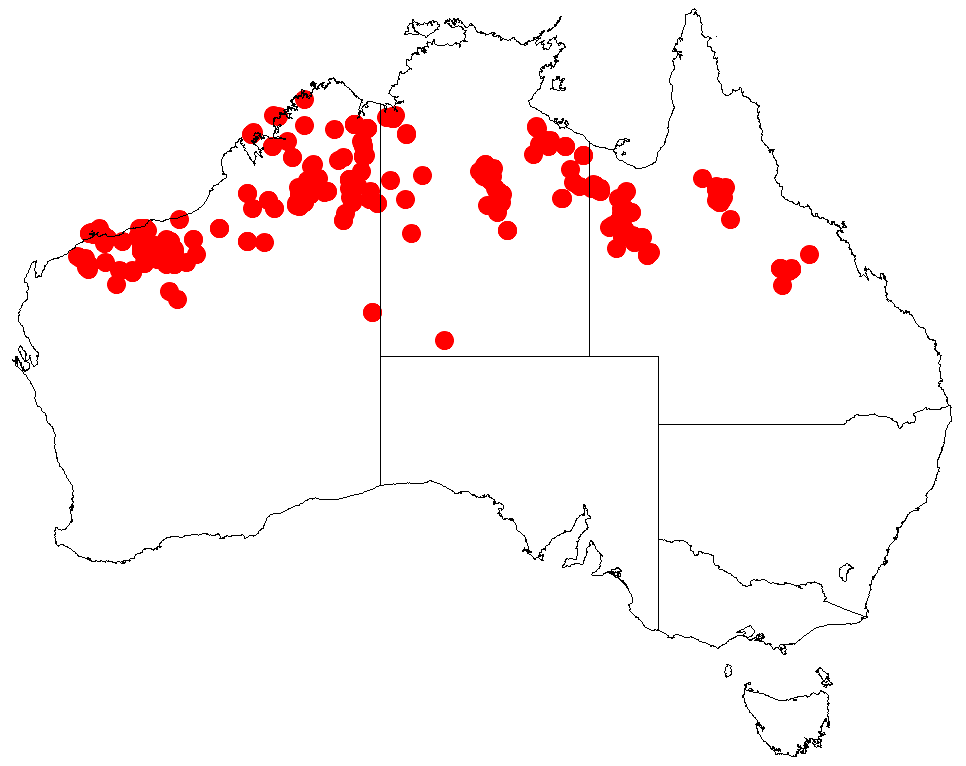
- Occurrence data from AVH

Synonyms
- Acacia pityoides F.Muell.; Acacia xylocarpa A.Cunn. ex Benth. nom. illeg.; Racosperma orthocarpum (F.Muell.) Pedley

= Acacia orthocarpa =

Species of legume

Acacia orthocarpa, commonly known as Pilbara weeping wattle, needle-leaf wattle or straight-podded wattle, is a species of flowering plant in the family Fabaceae, and is endemic to northern Australia. It is a commonly weeping, or sometimes bushy and low spreading, resinous shrub or small tree with smooth bark, angular brown, glabrous branchlets, straight, terete, leathery phyllodes, spikes of yellow flowers and erect, linear, woody pods. The Nyangumarta peoples know it as yartupu.

== Description ==
Acacia orthocarpa is a commonly weeping, or sometimes bushy and low spreading shrub or small tree that typically grows to a height of up to 4 m (13 ft) and has smooth or flaky grey, dark grey or grey-brown bark. Its branchlets are slightly angular, brown and glabrous with conspicuous lenticels. The phyllodes are straight to more or less curved, terete to subterete, 25–156 mm (0.98–6.14 in) long, 0.5–1 mm (0.020–0.039 in) wide, leathery and glabrous with conspicuous stomata. The veins and midrib and two longitudinal veins are semiprominent, and there is sometimes a gland up to 2.6 mm (0.10 in) above the pulvinus. The flowers are yellow and borne in spikes 9–32 mm (0.35–1.26 in) long. Flowering occurs in most months, and the pods are erect, mostly linear, slightly biconvex to almost subterete, 30–100 mm (1.2–3.9 in) long, 3–8 mm (0.12–0.31 in) wide and woody. The seeds are oblong, 4.3–6 mm (0.17–0.24 in) long and dark brown with a narrowly conical aril.

== Taxonomy ==
Acacia orthocarpa was first formally described in 1859 by Ferdinand von Mueller in the Journal of the Proceedings of the Linnean Society, Botany from specimens collected near the McArthur River. The specific epithet is taken from the Greek words ortho meaning 'straight' and carpos meaning 'fruit', referring to the straight seed pods.

== Distribution and habitat ==
Pilbara weeping wattle grows in sandy flats, rocky hills and in rocky watercourses, in woodland and shrubland, often with spinifex in the Central Kimberley, Dampierland, Gascoyne, Great Sandy Desert, Northern Kimberley, Ord Victoria Plain, Pilbara, Tanami amd Victoria Bonaparte bioregions of Western Australia and central Northern Territory and the Lawn Hill–Mount Isa–Galilee and Georgetown–Gilberton areas of Queensland.

== See also ==
- List of Acacia species
