= Catherine H. Graham =

American team leader and senior scientist

- Born: January 21, 1970; United States
- Education: University of Missouri at St. Louis (MS), (PhD); Eckerd College (BA)
- Scientific career
- Fields: Ecology, ornithology
- Workplaces: Stony Brook University

Catherine Helen Graham is an American ecologist and senior scientist who studies biodiversity, conservation biology, and species distribution. She works in the Biodiversity & Conservation Biology and Spatial Evolutionary Ecology research units at the Swiss Federal Institute for Forest, Snow and Landscape Research WSL. From 2003 to 2017 she was an Assistant, Associate, or Full Professor of Ecology and Evolution at the Stony Brook University, and since her appointment at the WSL in 2017 she has maintained adjunct status there. She received both her M.S. degree (1995) and her Ph.D. (2000) from the University of Missouri at St. Louis, and did post-doctoral training at the Jet Propulsion Laboratory and the University of California, Berkeley. She studies biogeography, conservation biology, and ecology. Catherine H. Graham is most noted for her analysis of statistical models to describe species' distributions (Species Distribution Modeling). This work, conducted with Jane Elith, helps researchers understand how human activities influence biodiversity and species distribution. Her paper on niche conservatism with John J. Wiens is also highly cited. They focused on how species' retention of ancestral traits may limit geographic range expansion. In many of her papers, she has sought to unite ecology and evolutionary biology to derive a better understanding of the processes driving species diversity patterns. In particular, she and Paul Fine laid out a framework for interpreting community assembly processes from a phylogenetic approach to quantifying beta diversity. Her research is important for predicting how ecosystems may respond to climate change and human impact.

== Honors and professional contributions ==
Graham was named in the 2014 Thomson Reuters Highly Cited Researchers in the Environment/Ecology category, awarded to researchers for having an exceptional impact by ranking in the top 1% most cited researchers in their field of study.

Her 2006 paper with Jane Elith and others on novel methods to improve prediction of species' distributions from occurrence data, by mid-2014, had been cited about 3,000 times (Google Scholar citations July 31, 2014).

== Selected publications ==
- Elith, J., Graham, C.H., Anderson, R.P., Dudík, M., Ferrier, S., Guisan, A., Hijmans, R.J., Huettmann, F., Leathwick, J.R., Lehmann, A., Li, J., Lohmann, L.G., Loiselle, B.A., Manion, G., Moritz, C., Nakamura, M., Nakazawa, Y., Overton, J.M., Peterson, A.T., Phillips, S.J., Richardson, K.S., Scachetti-Pereira, R., Schapire, R.E., Soberón, J., Williams, S., Wisz, M.S. & Zimmermann, N.E. (2006) Novel methods improve prediction of species' distributions from occurrence data. Ecography, 29, 129–151.
- Wiens J.J. and C.H. Graham. (2005) Niche conservatism: integrating evolution, ecology, and conservation biology. Annual Review of Ecology, Evolution and Systematics, 36: 519–539.
- Graham, C.H., S. Ferrier, F. Huettman, C. Moritz and A.T. Peterson. 2004. "New developments in museum-based informatics and application in biodiversity analysis". Trends in Ecology and Evolution 19: 497–503.
- Graham, C.H., S.R. Ron, J.C. Santos, C.J. Schneider and C. Moritz. 2004. "Integrating phylogenetics and environmental niche models to explore speciation mechanisms in Dendrobatid frogs". Evolution 58: 1781–1793.
- Graham, C. H., & Fine, P. V. a. 2008. Phylogenetic beta diversity: linking ecological and evolutionary processes across space in time. Ecology Letters 11(12):1265–77.
- Graham, C. H., Parra, J. L., Rahbek, C., & McGuire, J. a. 2009. Phylogenetic structure in tropical hummingbird communities. Proceedings of the National Academy of Sciences of the United States of America 106 Suppl:19673–8.
- Graham, C.H., C. Moritz and S.E. Williams. 2006. Habitat history improves prediction of biodiversity in a rainforest fauna. Proceedings of the National Academy of Sciences, 103: 632–636.
