= Global Ecology and Biogeography =

- Discipline: Conservation, biogeography
- Language: English
- Edited by: Brian McGill

Publication details
- History: 1993-present
- Publisher: Wiley-Blackwell
- Frequency: Bimonthly
- Impact factor: 6.909 (2021)

Standard abbreviations
- ISO 4: Glob. Ecol. Biogeogr.

Indexing
- ISSN: 1466-8238

Links
- Journal homepage; Online access; Online archive

Global Ecology and Biogeography is a bimonthly peer-reviewed scientific journal that was established in 1991. It covers research in the field of macroecology. The current editors-in-chief are Amanda Bates (University of Victoria) and Maria Dornelas (University of St Andrews). According to the Journal Citation Reports, the journal has a 2021 impact factor of 6.909.
