= Diversity and Distributions =

- Discipline: Conservation biology, biogeography
- Language: English
- Edited by: K. C. Burns, Luca Santini, Aibin Zhan

Publication details
- Former name(s): Biodiversity Letters
- History: 1993–present
- Publisher: John Wiley & Sons
- Frequency: Bimonthly
- Impact factor: 4.092 (2018)

Standard abbreviations
- ISO 4: Divers. Distrib.

Indexing
- CODEN: DIDIFX
- ISSN: 1366-9516 (print); 1472-4642 (web)
- LCCN: 98641136
- JSTOR: 13669516
- OCLC no.: 39848596

Links
- Journal homepage; Online access; Online archive

Diversity and Distributions is a bimonthly peer-reviewed scientific journal on conservation biogeography. It was established in 1993 as Biodiversity Letters. The journal covers the applications of biogeographical principles, theories, and analyses to problems concerning the conservation of biodiversity. The editors-in-chief are K. C. Burns, Luca Santini, and Aibin Zhan, who took over from Janet Franklin in 2019. After over two decades as editor-in-chief, David M. Richardson stepped down from the role in December 2015. According to the Journal Citation Reports, the journal has a 2018 impact factor of 4.092, ranking it 2nd out of 37 journals in the category "Biodiversity Conservation" and 20th out of 134 journals in the category "Ecology".

== 2018 resignation of the editorial board ==
A majority of the editorial board of the journal resigned in 2018 after Wiley allegedly blocked the publication of a letter protesting the publisher's decision to make the journal entirely open access.
