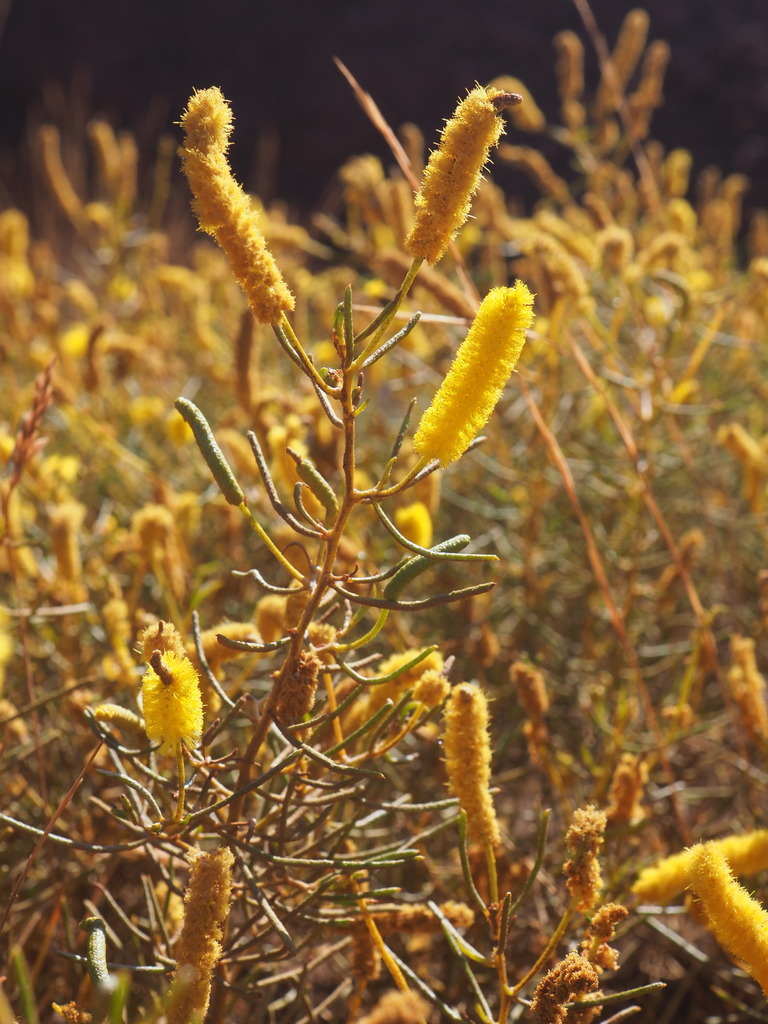

Scientific classification
- Kingdom: Plantae
- Clade: Tracheophytes
- Clade: Angiosperms
- Clade: Eudicots
- Clade: Rosids
- Order: Fabales
- Family: Fabaceae
- Subfamily: Caesalpinioideae
- Clade: Mimosoid clade
- Genus: Acacia
- Species: A. hilliana

Binomial name
- Acacia hilliana Maiden
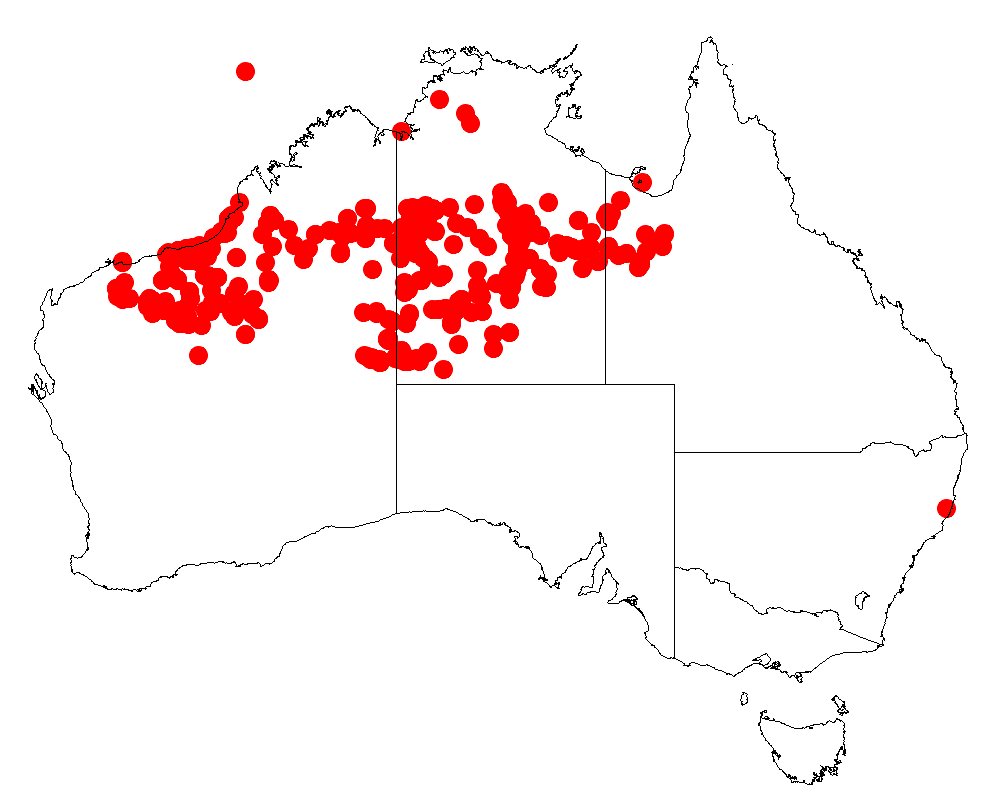
- Occurrence data from AVH

Synonyms
- Racosperma hillianum (Maiden) Pedley

= Acacia hilliana =

Hill's tabletop wattle

Species of legume

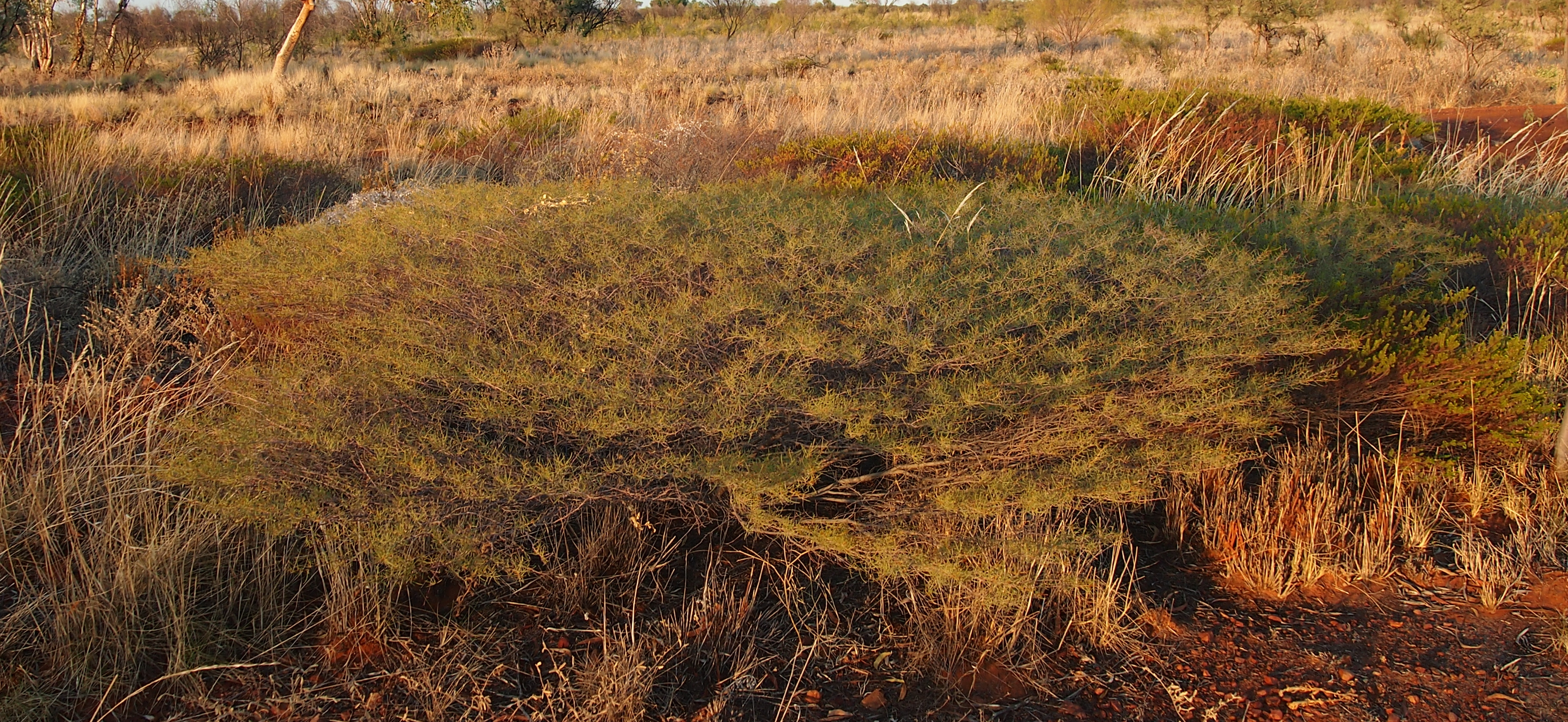
Habit

Acacia hilliana, commonly known as Hill's tabletop wattle, sandhill wattle, Hilltop wattle, and flying saucer bush, is a species of flowering plant in the family Fabaceae and is endemic to north-western Australia. It is a low, spreading to sprawling, sticky shrub with terete to compressed, leathery phyllodes, erect spikes of golden yellow flowers and erect, linear pods.

The Banyjima know it as bundaljingu, the Nyangumarta people call it puntanungu, and it is called ntwanengayte, ntwanegayt or pwentanengayte in the Kaytetye language.

== Description ==
Acacia hilliana is a low, sprawling to sprawling, semi-prostrate, usually flat-topped resinous, glabrous and sticky shrub that typically grows to a height of 0.3–1 m (1 ft 0 in – 3 ft 3 in) and 1–3 m (3 ft 3 in – 9 ft 10 in) wide and has horizontal branches. The phyllodes are green to grey-green and are sometimes in clusters of two or three, each phyllode 20–70 mm (0.79–2.76 in) long and 0.5–1.0 mm (0.020–0.039 in) wide, usually terete to compressed and shallowly curved upwards. The flowers are erect, golden yellow and borne in spikes 20–45 mm (0.79–1.77 in) long on peduncles 10–30 mm (0.39–1.18 in) long. Flowering has been recorded in most months with a peak in May and June. The pods are linear but narrowed towards the base, erect, woody, sticky with resin and have an odour resembling citronella or lemon grass. The seeds are 2.8–5.5 mm (0.11–0.22 in) long, laterally compressed and chestnut coloured to brown.

== Taxonomy ==
Acacia hilliana was first formally described in 1917 by Joseph Maiden in the book, The Flora of the Northern Territory. The specific epithet (hilliana) honours Gerald Freer Hill who collected the type specimen used by Maiden to prepare the description of the plant.

== Distribution and habitat ==
Hill's tabletop wattle is widespread and relatively common in northern and central Australia, extending from the Pilbara region of Western Australia through the Northern Territory to north-west Queensland between about 17°S and 25°S. In Western Australia it usually grows on rocky ranges and plateaus, on sand dunes and sand plains in red sandy and stony soils. In the Northern Territory it occurs with spinifex on rocky or gravelly ranges on hills and rises, and extends into far north-western Queensland.

== Conservation status ==
Acacia hilliana is listed as "not threatened" by the Western Australian Government Department of Biodiversity, Conservation and Attractions, as of "least concern" under the Northern Territory Territory Parks and Wildlife Conservation Act and Queensland Government Nature Conservation Act 1992.

== See also ==
- List of Acacia species
