= Acacia arrecta =

Yarnda nyirra wattle

Scientific classification
- Kingdom: Plantae
- Clade: Tracheophytes
- Clade: Angiosperms
- Clade: Eudicots
- Clade: Rosids
- Order: Fabales
- Family: Fabaceae
- Subfamily: Caesalpinioideae
- Clade: Mimosoid clade
- Genus: Acacia
- Species: A. arrecta

Binomial name
- Acacia arrecta Maslin
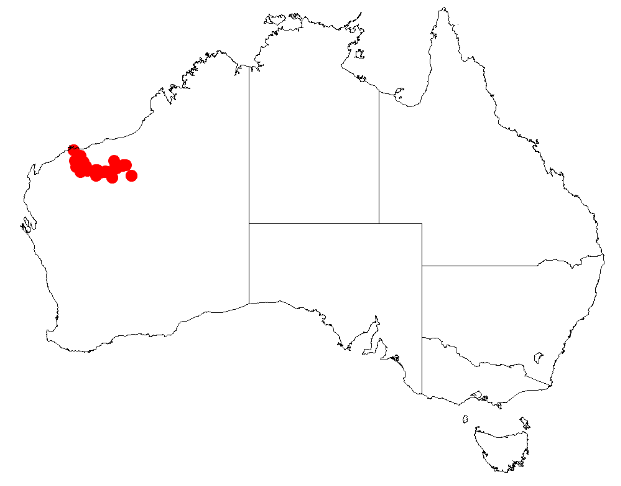
- Occurrence data from AVH

Synonyms
- Racosperma arrectum (Maslin) Pedley

Species of legume

Acacia arrecta, commonly known as yarnda nyirra wattle or Fortescue wattle, is a species of flowering plant in the family Fabaceae and is endemic to the Pilbara region of Western Australia. It is a compact, spreading shrub with curved, phyllodes that are round in cross-section, spherical heads of bright yellow flowers, and rigid, linear pods up to 55 mm (2.2 in) long.

== Description ==
Acacia arrecta is a dense, spreading, rounded or flat-topped shrub that typically grows to a height of 0.4–1 m (1 ft 4 in – 3 ft 3 in), up to 2 m (6 ft 7 in) wide, and has smooth, more or less grey bark and usually many stems at the base. Its phyllodes are grey-green, resinous but not sticky, round in cross section, 15–40 mm (0.59–1.57 in) long and about 1 mm (0.039 in) wide. The flowers are bright yellow and born in dense spherical heads 7–10 mm (0.28–0.39 in) in diameter, on a peduncle 15–40 mm (0.59–1.57 in) long, the heads with 30 to 45 flowers. Flowering occurs from March to June, and the pods are rigidly erect, linear, circular to compressed in cross-section, 35–55 mm (1.4–2.2 in) long and 4–6 mm (0.16–0.24 in) wide, containing elliptic brown seeds 2.8–4 mm (0.11–0.16 in) long.

== Taxonomy ==
Acacia arrecta was first formally described in 1982 by the botanist Bruce Maslin in the journal Nuytsia from specimens collected by Maslin in 1980,11 km (6.8 mi) east of Wittenoom on the road to Port Hedland. The specific epithet (arrecta) means 'erect' and alludes to the erect phyllodes, inflorescences and pods. The common name yarnda nyirra wattle is the Yindjibarndi people's name for the Fortescue River.

== Distribution ==
This species of Acacia is native to an area in the Pilbara region where it commonly grows on stony flats and low rocky hills in shallow rocky soils. The range of the plant is from around Millstream Chichester National Park in the west to around Nullagine in the east and as far south as the Hamersley Range near Wittenoom. It is quite common in areas where it is found but has an overall scattered distribution. It is usually a part of shrubland communities that is dominated spinifex.

== See also ==
- List of Acacia species
