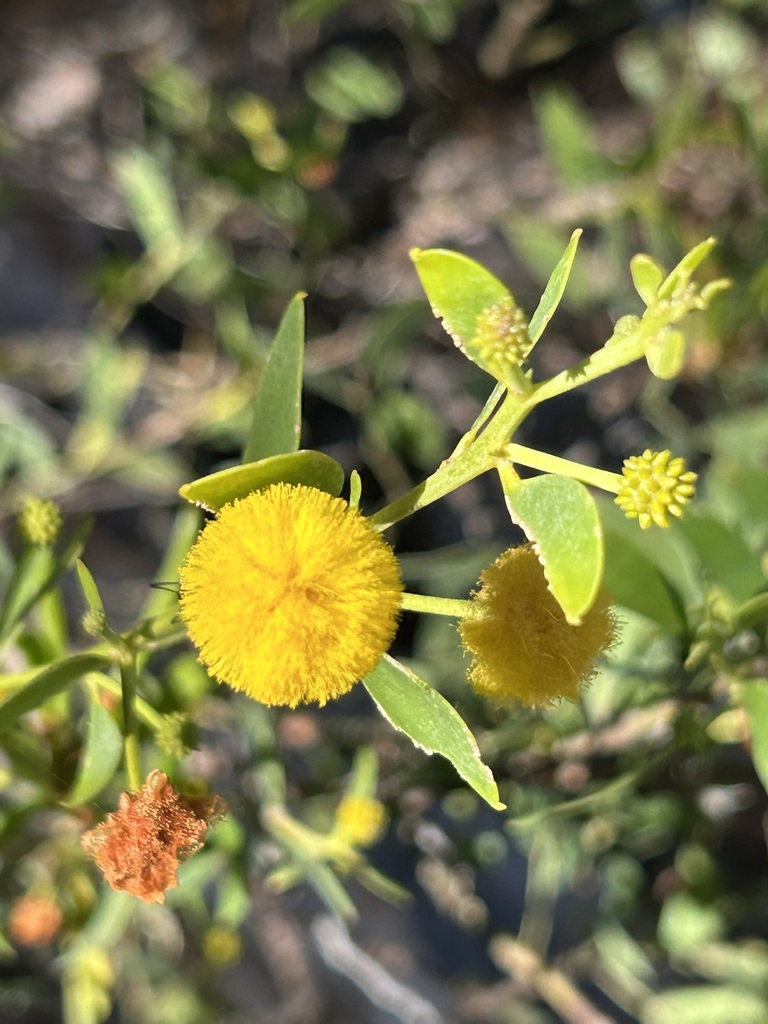
- In the Wunaamin Conservation Park

Scientific classification
- Kingdom: Plantae
- Clade: Embryophytes
- Clade: Tracheophytes
- Clade: Spermatophytes
- Clade: Angiosperms
- Clade: Eudicots
- Clade: Rosids
- Order: Fabales
- Family: Fabaceae
- Subfamily: Caesalpinioideae
- Clade: Mimosoid clade
- Genus: Acacia
- Species: A. stellaticeps

Binomial name
- Acacia stellaticeps Kodela, Tindale & D.Keith
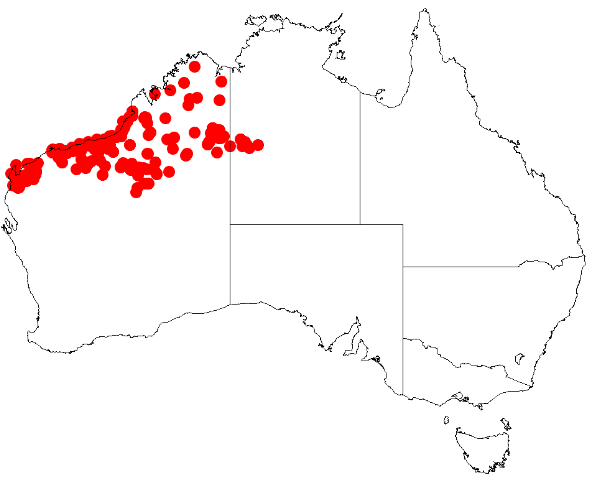
- Occurrence data from AVH

= Acacia stellaticeps =

Northern star wattle

Species of legume

Acacia stellaticeps, commonly known as northern star wattle, poverty bush and glistening wattle. Indigenous Australians the Nyangumarta peoples know the bush as pirrnyur or pirrinyurru and the Ngarla peoples know it as panmangu. It is a shrub of the genus Acacia and the subgenus Plurinerves.

== Description ==
The low dense shrub typically grows to a height of 2 metres (7 ft) and to a width of around 3 m (9.8 ft). It has numerous slender main stems separating from each other at ground level that are covered in smooth or finely fissured, grey coloured bark. Like most species of Acacia it has phyllodes rather than true leaves. The dull-green to greyish green phyllodes have an asymmetrically elliptic-obovate shape and are usually slightly sigmoid. They have a length of 5 to 25 mm (0.20 to 0.98 in) and a width of 3 to 15 mm (0.12 to 0.59 in) and appear nerveless with one to three longitudinal nerves that are slightly more distinct than the others. It blooms from October to May and produces yellow flowers.

== Taxonomy ==
The species was first formally described in 2001 Phillip Kodela, Mary Tindale and David Keith in Nuytsia. It was reclassified as Racosperma stellaticeps in 2003 by Leslie Pedley then transferred back to genus Acacia in 2006.

== Distribution ==
It is native to an area in the Kimberley, Pilbara and northern Goldfields regions of Western Australia. It is commonly found on flats, plains and sand ridges where it grows in stony sandy or clay soils. It is mostly found from around the Exmouth Gulf in the south to around Broome in the north extending eastward into the Great Sandy Desert and the Tanami Desert in the Northern Territory. The shrub is usually found in soft spinifex communities especially those with Triodia pungens and Triodia epactia and in red sandy soils where A. stellaticeps can large, dense, pure stands.

== See also ==
- List of Acacia species
