= Ecological Society of Australia =

Ecological professional association

- Abbreviation: ESA
- Formation: February 15, 1959; 67 years ago
- Founded at: Canberra, ACT
- Legal status: charity
- Location: Australia
- Products: peer-reviewed journals, newsletters, fact sheets, and teaching resources
- Services: Membership, Meetings, Networking, Research Endowments, Indigenous Engagement, Post-graduate Research Grants and Awards, Equity & Diversity Program, Policy Engagement, Practitioner Engagement, Science Communication
- Members: >1,500
- Official language: English
- President: Dieter Hochuli
- Website: www.ecolsoc.org.au

The Ecological Society of Australia (ESA) is a professional organisation of ecologists. Based in Australia and founded in 1959, ESA publications include peer-reviewed journals, newsletters, fact sheets, and on-line resources. It holds an annual conference, sometimes in conjunction with the New Zealand Ecological Society (EcoTAS) including the joint meetings EcoTAS 2013 (Auckland, NZ) and EcoTAS 2017 (Hunter Valley, NSW).

ESA's over 1500 members are researchers, educators, natural resource managers, and students from all Australian states and territories. The ESA has an over 60-year history supporting ecologists, promoting ecology and ecological research.

ESA publishes two journals: Austral Ecology and Ecological Management and Restoration.

== History ==
The first discussions on the formation of the society took place on May 6, 1958 with the formation of the Ecological Discussion Group, an initiative of Mr Ray Perry, the senior ecologist at the CSIRO Division of Land Research and Regional Survey. The first formal step to establish a national ecological society took place on February 18, 1959 at a meeting of Canberra ecologists chaired by Dr Milton Moore, Assistant Chief of the CSIRO Division of Plant Industry. The meeting carried the resolution unanimously that "an ecological group be formed in Canberra with the objective of stimulating the formation of similar groups in other centres and the eventual amalgamation of all such groups into a national ecological society". The Ecological Society of Australia was formed on August 1, 1960 when 72 members of the Canberra Ecological Group became Foundation Members of the Society. The Society's original activities consisted of symposia and meetings held in conjunction with the ANZAAS (Australian and New Zealand Association for the Advancement of Sciences) Meetings, the major scientific event of the year in Australia and New Zealand. The Society's journal, originally called the Australian Journal of Ecology, first appeared in 1976.

== Censorship issue ==
An article published by Nature in September 2020 detailed results of a survey of ecology-related scientists that indicated many were experiencing increased pressure to suppress information about their scientific research, in Australia and around the world. ESA offered suggestions for solutions through institutional changes and established a permanent online portal for anonymous reporting of suppression of information derived through environmental research.

== Working Groups ==
Academic Freedom works to understand the limitations on academic freedom imposed on government and university scientists, including self-imposed limitations arising from implied threats, scope of research topics and open communication of research findings, evaluate constraints and safeguards imposed by public service codes of conduct, and where possible, to provide illustrative examples of suboptimal practice, and seek to develop best practice guidelines and make recommendations to the board for how the ESA could respond.

Conference works to develop a more strategic vision for ESA Annual conferences and reduce the administrative burden of the Local Organising Committee (LOC) and develop appropriate policies related to conference attendance regarding equity and conduct.

Early Career Ecologists works to develop and implement strategies to engage and improve services for early career ecologists including regular dedicated ECE workshops.

Education works to develop a community of practice among ecologists involved in education to create opportunities for ecologists involved in education to engage with ESA and identify opportunities for ecologists to contribute to K-12 education in schools through outreach and curriculum development and to promote and support ecology in tertiary education.

Equity and Diversity works to ensure that all persons are treated equitably and with a level of mutual respect and establish a range of practices and guidelines that actively counteract bias and prejudice, promotes inclusive practices, and encourages all persons to communicate respectfully and fairly.

Financial Governance works with the Board to develop an annual budget for the Board's endorsement, including consideration of individual budget requests, monitors expenditures and receipts, recommends to the Board annual adjustments to membership fees and seekw to identify and enhance financial management practices and process of the organisation.

Fundraising and Sponsorship is responsible for identifying and implementing strategies and opportunities to seek funding to progress and support ESA initiatives.

Indigenous Engagement works to develop a broad strategy for support and development of Indigenous Ecological Knowledge structures for implementation under the umbrella of the Society and advise the ESA Board on Indigenous Engagement opportunities and priorities.

Journals works with the two journals, Austral Ecology and Ecological Management and Restoration, to assess budgets, prepare contracts, identify threats to publication income, identify new initiatives and maintain clear differentiation of content.

Membership works to maintain and increase membership numbers, identify areas of growth and attrition and develop targeted plans to address member needs.

Policy works to advance the ESA's goals to promote integration of ecological principles in the use and conservation of natural resources, and to advise government and other groups on matters relevant to ecology.

Practitioner Engagement works to develop strategies to enhance practitioner engagement with the Society and to develop programs and initiatives that will assist ecological practitioners to undertake their professional roles.

== ESA Grants and Awards ==
Student Awards and Grants

- Student Research Awards
- Jill Landsberg Trust Fund Scholarship
- Fundamental Ecology Award
- Holsworth Wildlife Research Endowment Grant
- ESA Conference Student Travel Grants
- ESA Conference Student Prizes
- Applied Forest Ecology Scholarship

Early-Career Ecologist (ECE) Awards

- Next Generation Ecologist Award
- ARDC Award for New Developers of Open Source Software in Ecology
- Austral Ecology Early Career Reviewer Program

Ecological Impact Award

ESA Conference Grants & Awards

- Childcare Travel Grants
- Indigenous Travel Grants
- Student Travel Grants
- Early Career Ecologist Conference Travel Grants
- Peter Fairweather Student Conference Support Award
- Student Prizes
- Bush Heritage Australia Prizes

Australian Ecology Research Award (AERA)

ESA Gold Medal

ESA Members' Service Prize

ESA/UNSW Prize for Inspiring Ecology Teaching

Equity and Diversity Champion Program
