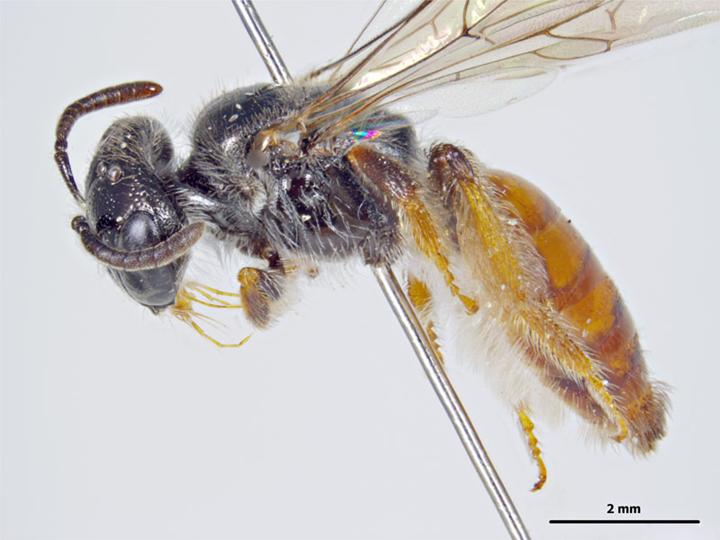
- Female

Scientific classification
- Kingdom: Animalia
- Phylum: Arthropoda
- Clade: Pancrustacea
- Class: Insecta
- Order: Hymenoptera
- Family: Colletidae
- Genus: Leioproctus
- Species: L. davisi

Binomial name
- Leioproctus davisi Maynard 1994

= Leioproctus davisi =

Species of bee

Leioproctus davisi, or Leioproctus (Filiglossa) davisi, is a species of bee in the family Colletidae and subfamily Colletinae. It is endemic to Australia. It was described by Australian entomologist Glynn Maynard in 1994.

== Etymology ==
The specific epithet davisi honours G.J. Davis.

== Description ==
Female body length is about 5 mm, male body length 4–4.5 mm. Integumental colouration is mainly black; the metasoma of females is orange-brown, that of males black with a broad yellow band.

== Distribution and habitat ==
The species occurs in Victoria. The type locality is Powelltown. It has also been recorded from Mount Baw Baw.

== Behaviour ==
The adults are solitary flying mellivores that nest gregariously in the ground. Flowering plants visited by the bees include Persoonia arborea.

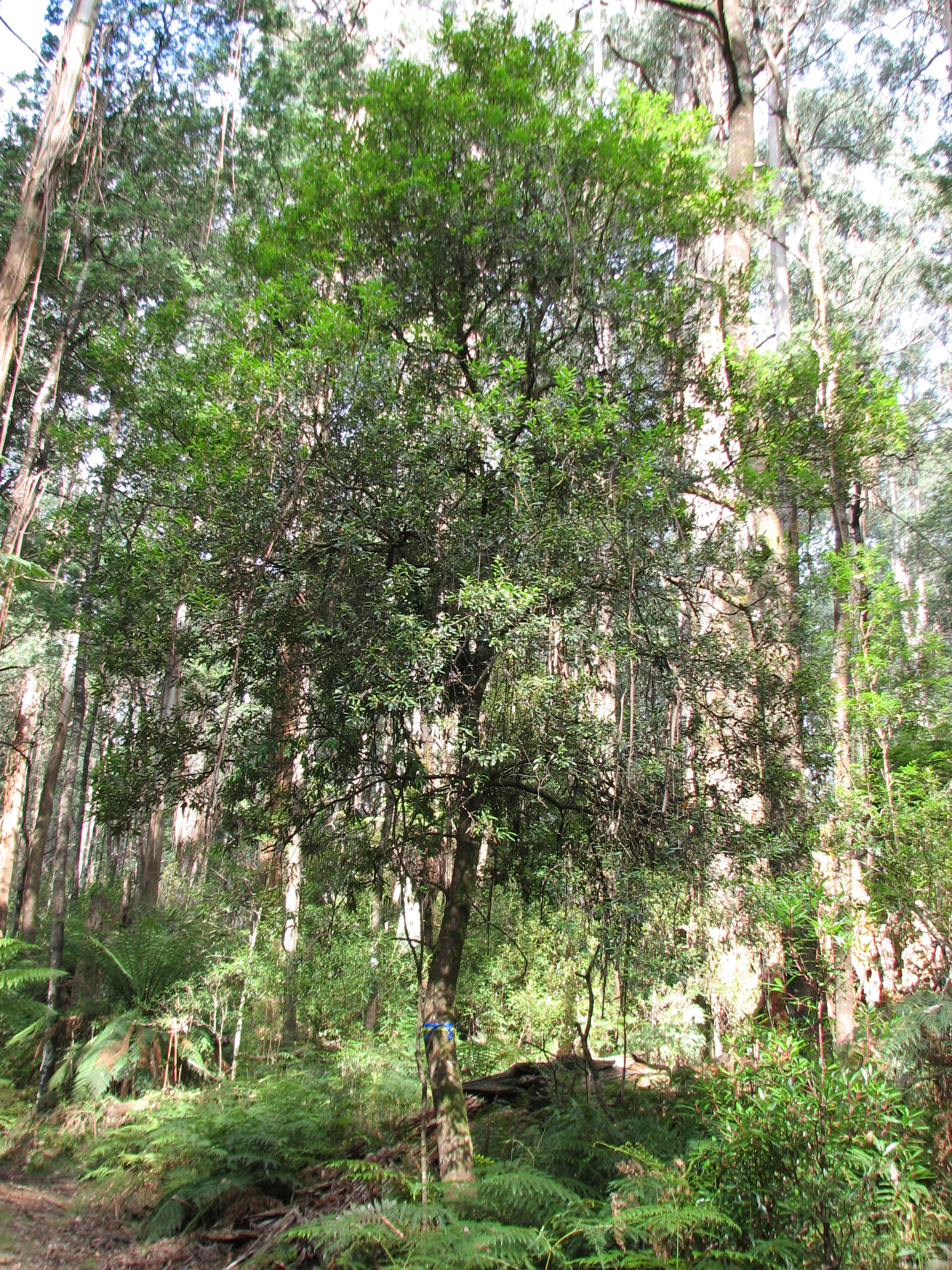
Persoonia arborea (tree geebung), a forage plant of the bees

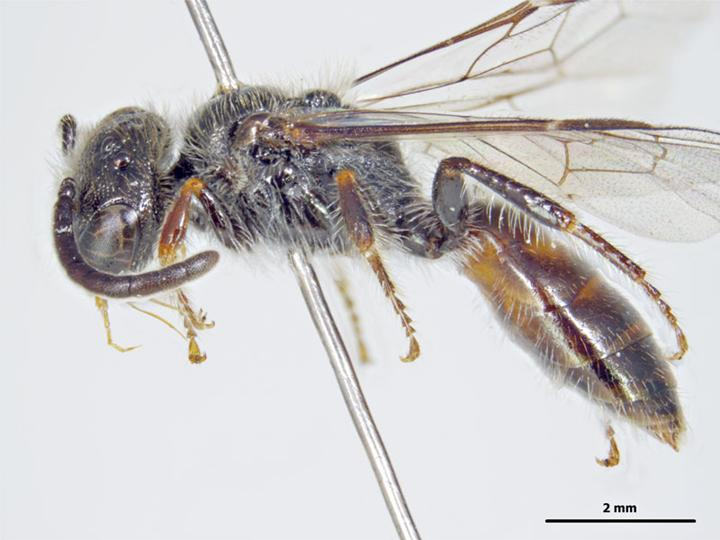
Male
