= Toolangi State Forest =

Forested region in southern Australia

Toolangi State Forest Toolangi
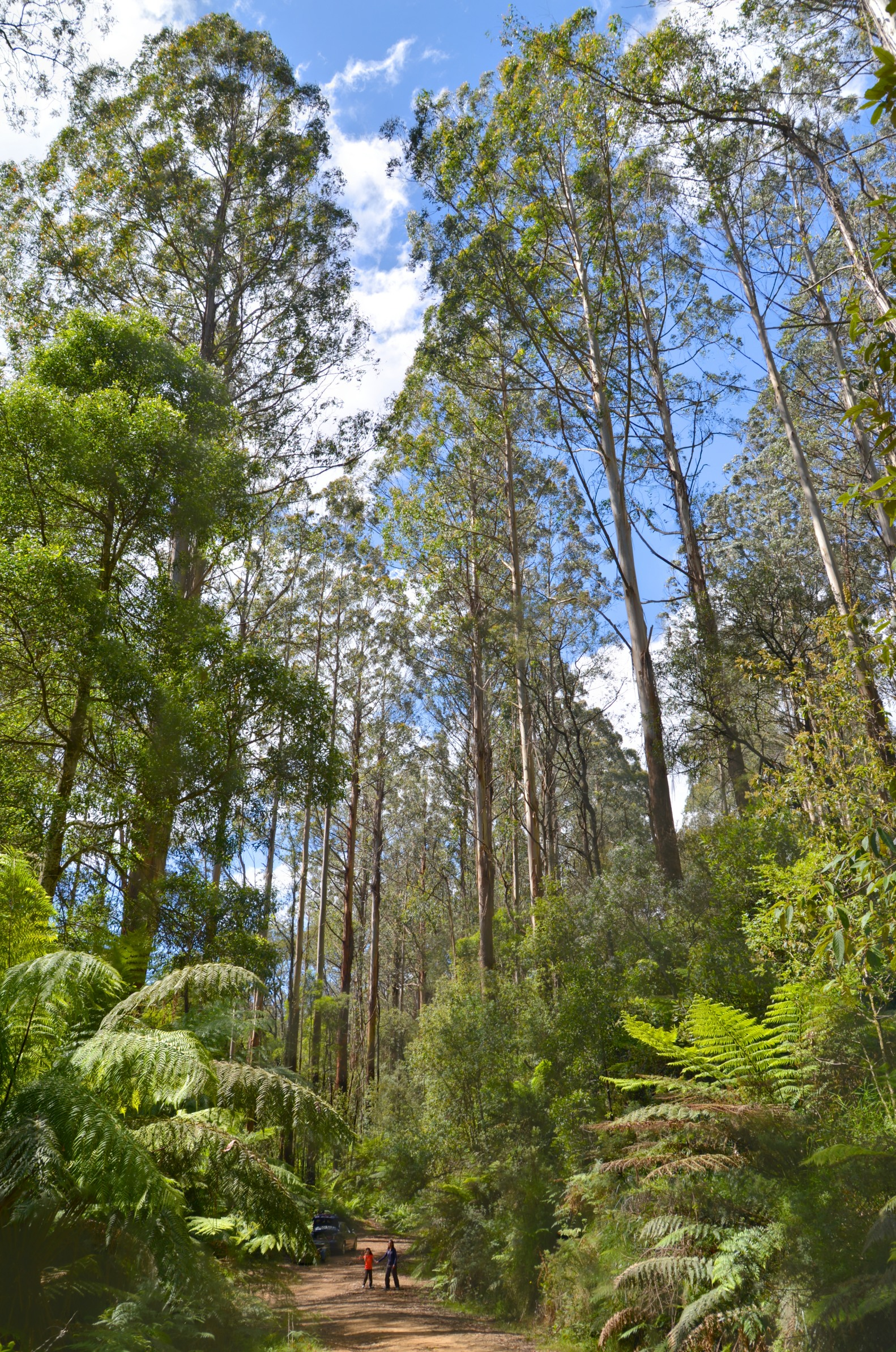
- Toolangi State Forest, Yea Link Track
- Interactive map of Toolangi State Forest

Geography
- Location: Central Highlands (Victoria), Australia
- Coordinates: 37°32′15″S 145°30′44″E
- Elevation: 700 to 100m

Administration
- Authority: Department of Energy, Environment and Climate Action

Ecology
- Indicator plants: Eucalyptus regnans
- Fauna: Leadbeater's possum

Location in Victoria

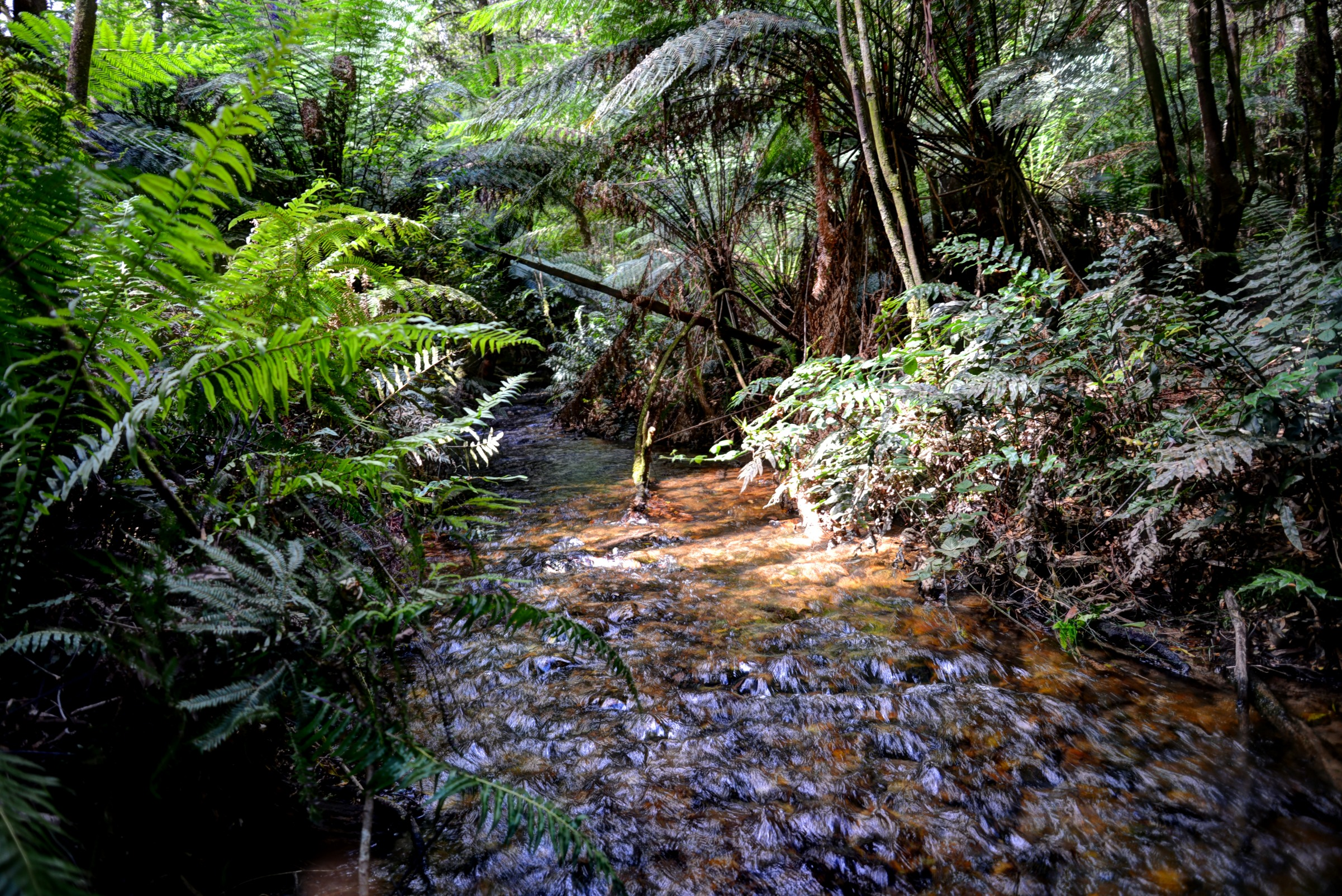
Yea River along Yea Link Road track near Little Red Toolangi Treehouse

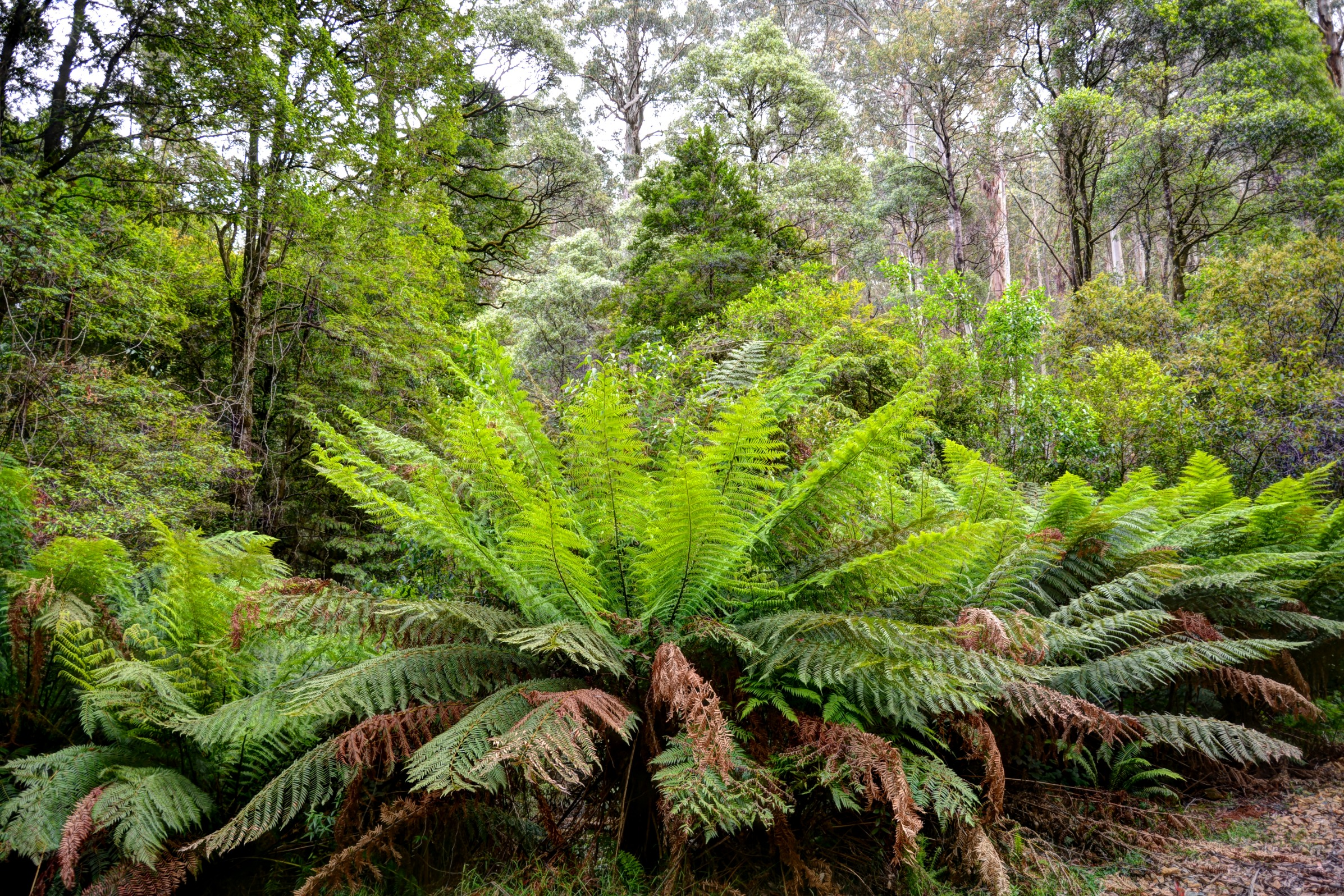
Forest along Yea Link Road track near Little Red Toolangi Treehouse

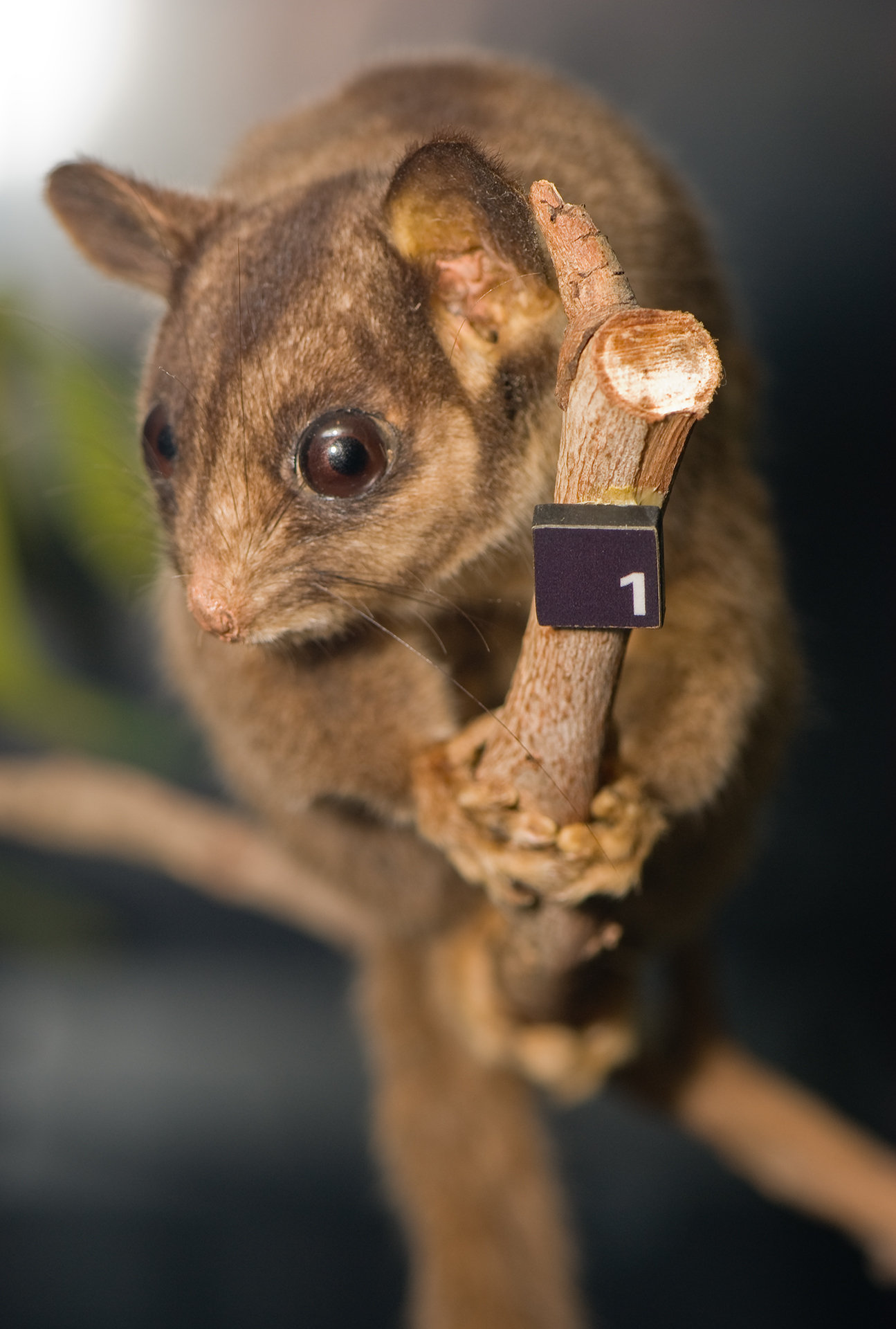
Leadbeater's possum

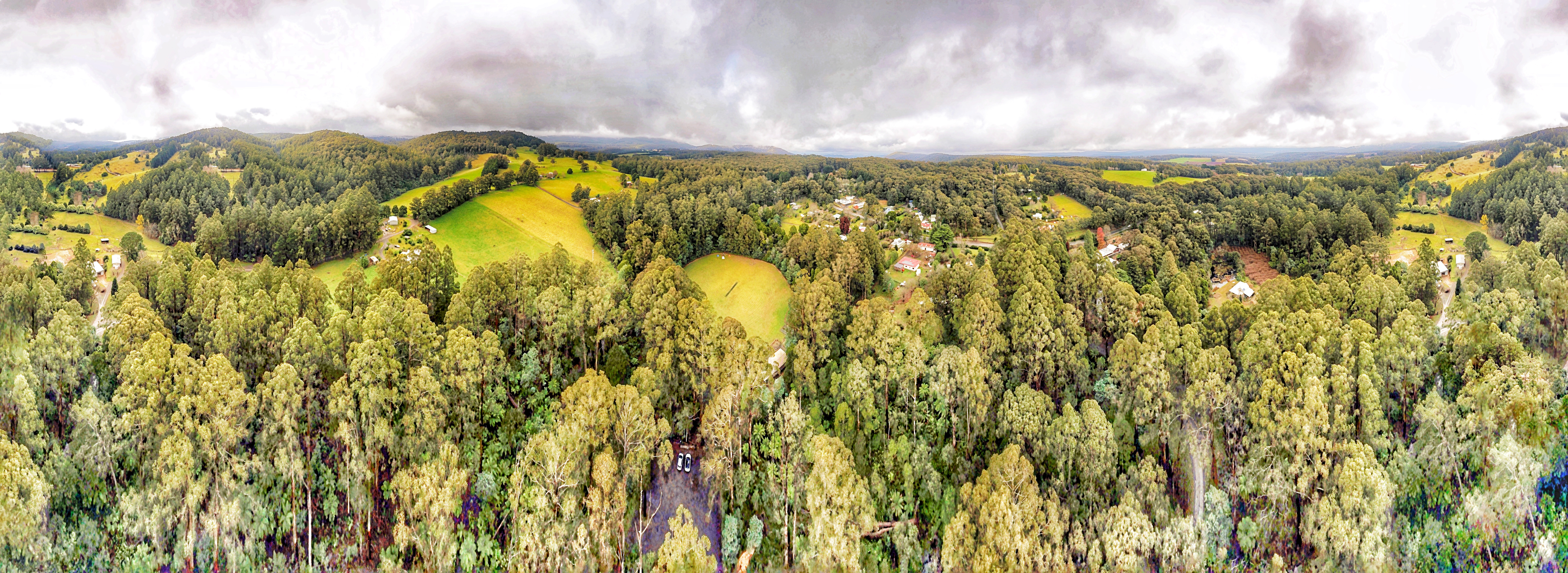
Toolangi from the air in June 2020

The Toolangi State Forest region in southern Australia extends from Mount Monda in the south up to Murrindindi in the north and includes the township of Toolangi. The forest is mainly eucalypt forest that has regrown from the 1939 Victoria Bushfires.

Large sections of the forest were also burnt in the 2009 Victorian Bushfires, although there are some pockets of old-growth forest that have not been logged or seriously burnt.

Notably, the forest provides habitat for the threatened Leadbeater's possum.

== Kalatha Giant tree ==
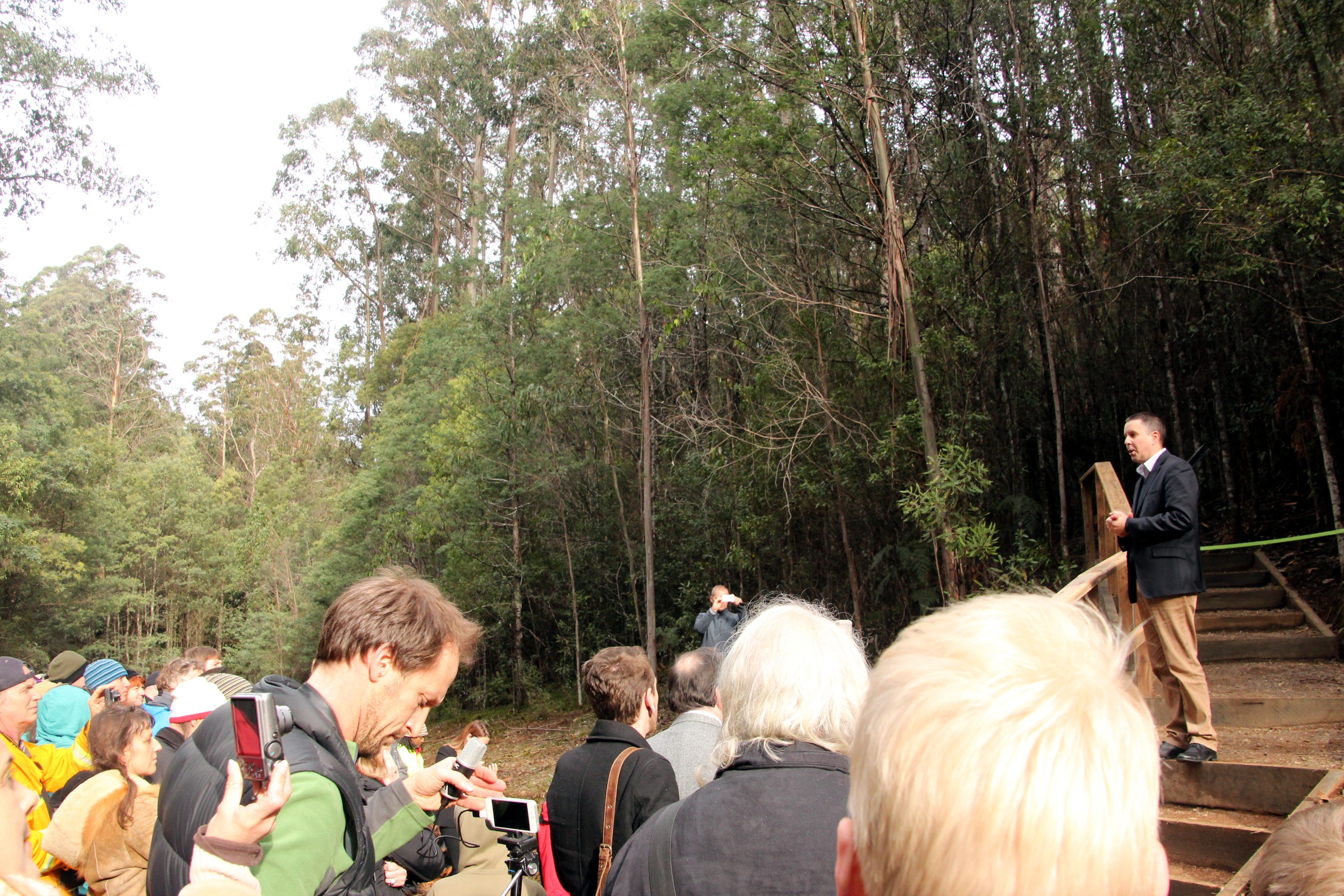
Federal Environment Minister Mark Butler opening the Kalatha walk on National Tree Day, July 28, 2013, Sylvia Creek Rd, Toolangi, Victorian Central Highlands

After the Black Saturday bushfires of 2009, the Toolangi and Castella community proposed to construct a walk to the Kalatha Giant tree located at Kalatha Creek in the Toolangi State Forest. The Kalatha Giant Tree Walk Forest project was funded by the Victorian Bushfires Appeal Fund and was declared open by the federal Minister for the Environment, the Hon. Mark Butler, on 28 July, National Tree Day.

The Kalatha Giant, a mountain ash (Eucalyptus regnans), has striking buttressing and is the seventh largest tree in Victoria with a volume of 200 cubic metres, a girth of 13.85 metres and is 65.5 metres tall.

== Recreation ==
The Toolangi State Forest is popular for a variety of recreation uses due to its proximity to Melbourne and its natural attributes. Recreation activities include bushwalking, birdwatching, mountain biking, trail bike riding and four wheel driving.

=== Walking tracks ===
There are a number of walking tracks in the Toolangi State Forest including:

- Yea River Walk. Loop walk starting at the Toolangi Visitors' Centre (4 km, one hour, May 2008)
- Sculpture Walk. Loop walk starting at the Toolangi Visitors' Centre. (3 km, 45 mins, July 2006)
- Wirra Willa Rainforest Walk. Healesville, Myers Creek Rd, Sylvia Rd, to small car park at entrance to Rainforest Walk. (2 km, 1 hr, December 2005).
- Blue Mountain Ascent. Good views across Yarra Valley. Weasel Creek Track is a former logging route, winding its way through interesting forest. (6 km, 1.5 hrs, April 2008).
- Xanthorrhoea Track. Track passes through grass trees (Xanthorrhoea Australia) and Banksias. Good views across Chum Creek Valley. (1.5 hrs, 4 km, April 2008)
- Old Tanglefoot Track - southern section. The old Tanglefoot Road is former logging track that continues 8 km to the north at Sylvia Creek Rd. Views to the east, towards the Victorian Alps, extensive regrowth. (6 km. 1.5 hrs, May 2008).
- Blowhard Range Walk. Depart from junction of Spragg's Rd and Blowhard Rd and walk up Blowhard Rd to dam and return. Excellent views across the Toolangi farms towards Mt Sugarloaf and the Dandenong Ranges. (6 km, 1.5 hrs, April 2008)
- Cole's Creek Track - Northern Sector. Depart from small carpark at signed Coles Creek Track, near the Wirrawilla Rainforest Reserve. Descend Coles Creek Track for about 2 km then return. Track follows the Yea River Gully. (4 km, 1.5 hrs, April 2008)
- Cockpit Track - Eastern Sector. Depart small car park at start of Yea Link Rd, just past the Wirrawilla Rainforest Reserve. Follow Yea Link road, reaching Cockpit Creek Tk. Go through, or around) gate, descend steeply to the Yea River crossing. Return to start. Track is steep, and very slippery during or after wet weather. (4 km, 1.5 hrs, May 2008)
- Monda Track - Dugout Section. Follow Monda Rd, past Mt St Leonard lookout gate, to small car park adjacent to gated track on south marked "Australian National Trail". Go through gate, ascend track steeply. Continue past high point then descend to the Monda Dugout on Monda Rd and return. Return to car. Good views to the Mt Murrindindi region. Final descent to the Dugout is very steep and slippery. Dugout is an old underground fire refuge.(3 km, 1 hr, June 2008)
- Mt Monda. Follow Monda Rd, past Mt St Leonard lookout gate to junction of Hardy Creek Rd near the Monda Dugout. Leave car at this junction. Walk easterly along Monda Rd, reaching the signed gate to Condon's Track (which is a very steep track down to the Maroondah Reservoir). This is near the Mt Monda Summit, Return to car. Monda Rd from the Dugout to the Condon's Track gate is stony, and slippery in wet weather and is not recommended for 2WD vehicles. (4 km, 1 hr, June 2008).
- Rouch Track - Depart small car park at Rouch Rd, opposite the Black Spur Motel. Walk along forest road in the Hermitage Creek Gully, reaching gate at the junction of Carson Track then return. (3 km, 1 hr, June 2008)
- Paul's Range North Track - Toolangi. Depart from small car park on Old Toolangi Rd next to Mill. Follow unsigned track steeply down the Gully and return. (2 km, 45 mins, June 2008)
- Wilhemina Falls - Murrindindi Scenic Reserve. Depart from Wilhemina car park (Murrindindi Rd) close to ranger station. Cross river on the suspension bridge, then follow signed track to the Falls viewing platform, returning via Grassy Flats. Final section of track is stony and steep, slippery in wet weather. Steel chain hand rails have been installed along some of the more difficult sections. (4 km, 1.5 hrs, September 2008)

==== Tanglefoot Walking tracks ====
These are a 20 km loop walking route that may be undertaken as a single long walk, or as sections. Main access points with car parking are the Tanglefoot Car Park (Sylvia Creek Rd), the Wirrawilla Rainforest Reserve (Sylvia Creek Rd), and Mt St Leonard (Monda Rd). The route follows the Myrtle Gully Track, Quarry Rd, and the new Tanglefoot Track. The Mr Tanglefoot Boardwalk was opened in March 2008 and has a covered picnic area, seats and drinking water.

- Tanglefoot Walking Track Walk 1 - Mt. Tanglefoot Boardwalk. Depart from Myrtle Creek car park and follow signed Myrtle Creek Tk to junction, then proceed downhill along the Tanglefoot Track, reaching the newly constructed Boardwalk and return. Excellent rainforest, mountain ash timber, fern gullies. (4 km, 1 hr, March 2008)
- Tanglefoot Walking Track Walk 2 - Myrtle Gully Walk. Depart from Wirrawilla Rainforest car park and follow signed Myrtle Gully Walk. Excellent rainforest, mountain ash timber, fern gullies. T (6 km, 1.5 hrs, March 2008).
- Tanglefoot Walking Track Walk 3 - Southern Sector. Follow Monda Rd, passing Mt St Leonard gate, to open space at entrance to signed track. Descend to boardwalk and return. Forest environment, footbridges, fern gullies, birds. (6 km, 1.5 hrs, April 2008).
- Tanglefoot Walking Track Walk 4: Tanglefoot Walking Track - Northern Link. Depart Mt Tanglefoot picnic ground and follow signed Tanglefoot Walking Track to Myrtle Ck car park and return. (3 km, 1 hr, February 2008).

== Rare and threatened species ==
The following plant species found in Central Highlands Forests, including the Toolangi State Forest, are listed under either the Flora and Fauna Guarantee Act 1988 and/or the Environment Protection and Biodiversity Conservation Act 1999:

- Amphibromus pithogastrus, swollen swamp wallaby-grass (threatened)
- Astelia australiana, tall astelia (threatened, vulnerable)
- Caladenia concolor, maroon spider orchid (threatened)
- Caladenia rosella, rosella spider orchid (threatened, endangered)
- Carex tasmanica, curly sedge (threatened)
- Cyathea cunninghamii, slender tree-fern (threatened)
- Cullen tenax, tough psoralea (threatened)
- Eucalyptus crenulata, Buxton gum (threatened, endangered)
- Grevillea barklyana, gully grevillea (threatened)
- Lepidium hyssopifolium, small pepper-cress (threatened, endangered)
- Nematolepis wilsonii, shiny phebalium, syn.: Phebalium wilsonii (threatened)
- Senecio laticostatus (vulnerable)
- Senecio macrocarpus, large-fruit groundsel (threatened, vulnerable)
- Thismia rodwayi, fairy lanterns (threatened)
- Xerochrysum palustre, swamp everlasting, syn.: Bracteantha sp. aff. subundulata (threatened)

The following animal species found in Central Highlands Forests, including the Toolangi State Forest, are listed in the Central Highlands Forest Management Plan 1998:

- Leadbeater's possum
- Spot-tailed quoll
- Powerful owl
- Sooty owl
- Masked owl

== Logging ==
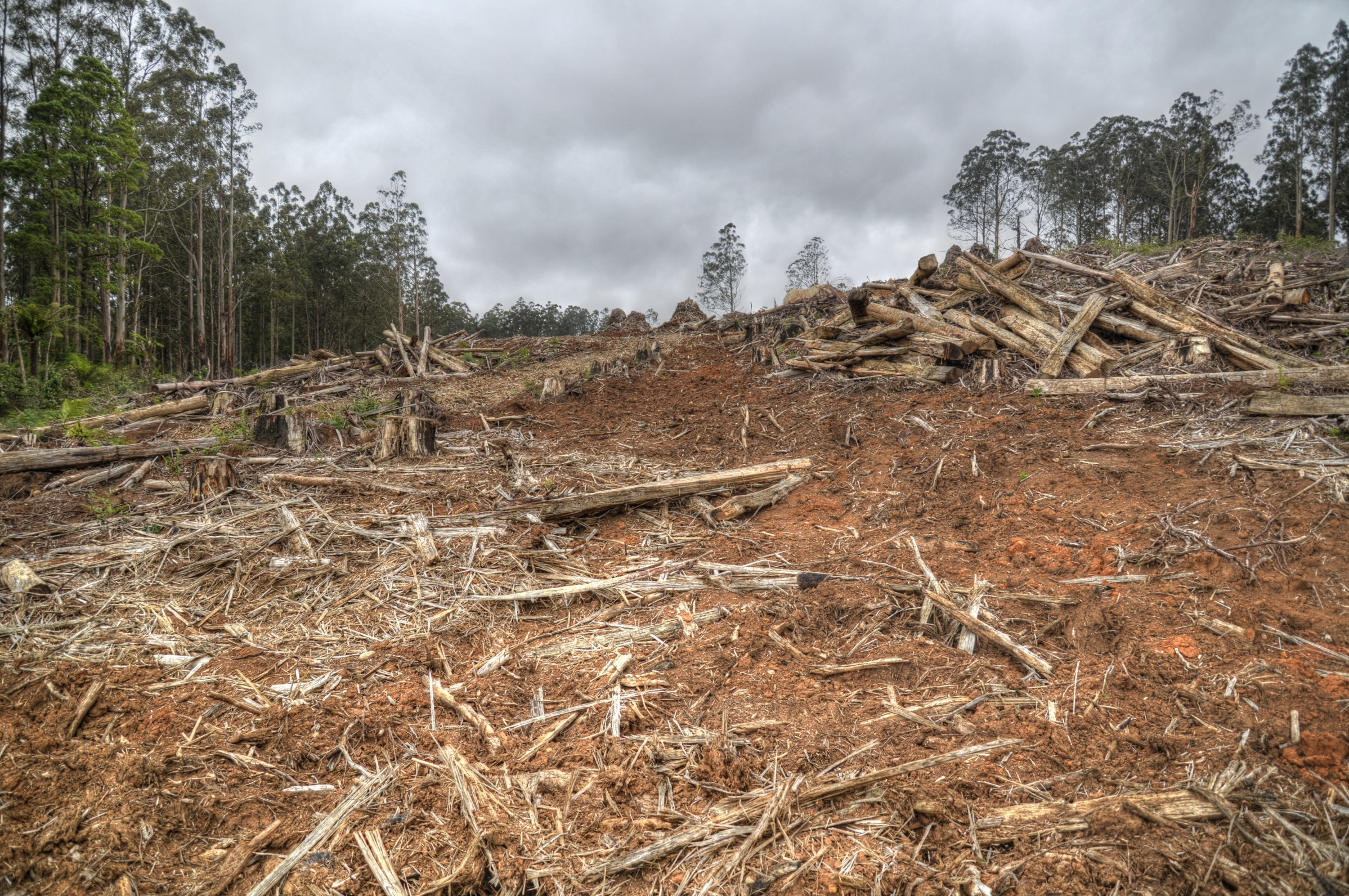
Logging in Toolangi State Forest along Blowhard Track. Taken 4 Jan 2014.

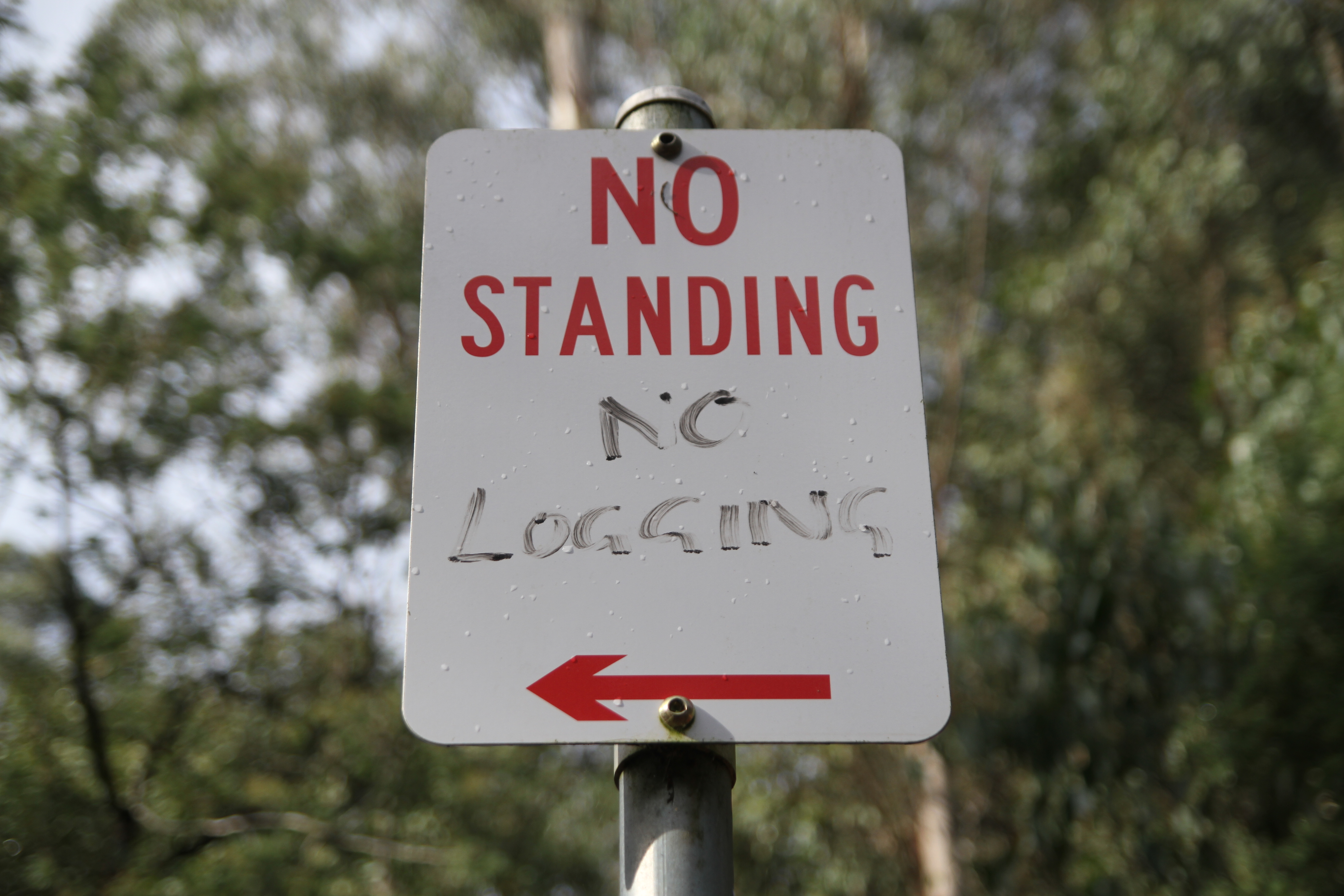
Minor vandalism demonstrates local opposition against logging.

Logging within the Toolangi State Forest is sanctioned by the Victorian government and is managed by the Department of Environment and Primary Industries (Victoria) and VicForests. There is strong local opposition to this logging due to the destruction of small remaining areas of intact forests that provide habitat for the threatened Leadbeater's possum.

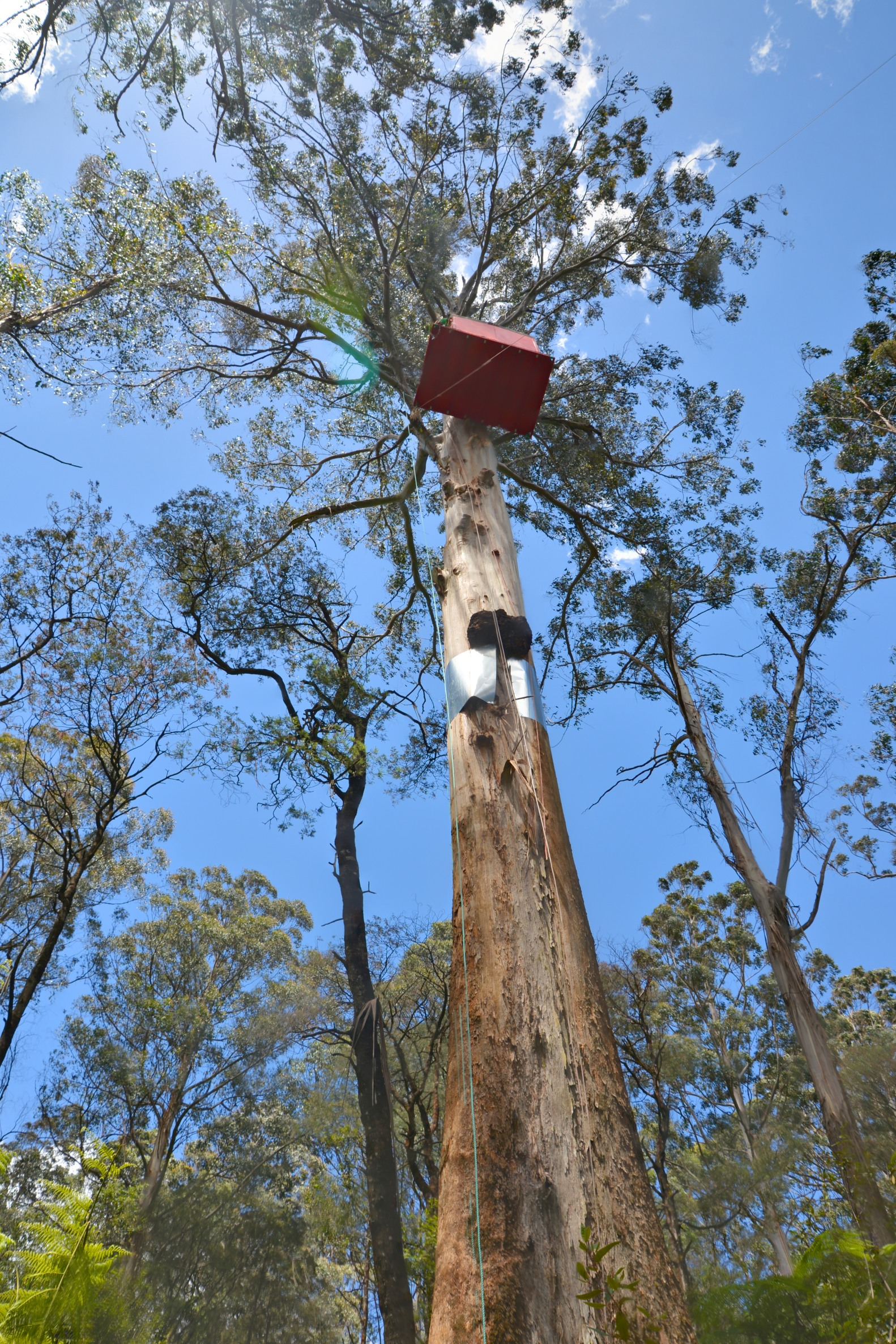
The Little Red Toolangi Treehouse in the Toolangi State Forest, Victoria, Australia

On 8 June 2011 Councillors of the Yarra Ranges Shire voted to write to politicians and call for an immediate halt to logging and future logging on the Bicentennial Trail and Mt St Leonard.

=== Save Sylvia Creek Supreme Court Case ===
Following a community led blockade on Sylvia Creek Road, Toolangi State Forest in July to August 2011, MyEnvironment Inc, a local environment group, obtained an injunction in the Supreme Court, preventing logging in the subject coupes pending resolution of the allegation of unlawful logging. The legal case proceeded on the basis that the logging of the three coupes:

- would destroy high-conservation value forest, including Leadbeater’s possum habitat, as defined in the relevant Action Statement,
- would be conducted by the clear-fell silviculture system, as indicated in the TRP, 25 September 2009, updated 24 August 2010 and again 15 June 2011
- would be followed by a regeneration burn, as is established (effectively invariable) practice following clear-felling.

In late January 2012 MyEnvironment Inc. received an open offer to limit the area logged in the three subject coupes if the action was discontinued. The action proceeded.

==== Result of court case ====
Justice Osborn accepted VicForests interpretation that the primary instrument they are required to follow in logging is the Prescription in the Central Highlands Forest Management Plan that includes Leadbeater’s Possum Zone 1A Habitat (living mature and senescing trees) in the Special Protection Zone. He did not agree with VicForests that the trees must be both mature and senescing but preferred the interpretation that both living mature and living senescing trees would be counted. He defined mature as more than 120 years old.

He also found the Action Statement under the FFG Act does not independently impose obligations on VicForests.

On this basis, Justice Osborn found that:

- Logging conducted in the Gun Barrel logging coupe prior to the injunction had not been unlawful, in that no Zone 1A (as now defined) had been logged.
- There is no Zone 1A (as now defined) in Gun Barrel and that the logging now proposed will not be unlawful.
- Planning for Freddo and South Col coupes has not progressed to a point where it can be said that what is intended to be done would be unlawful; we don’t yet know what is intended.
- VicForests is required to comply with the precautionary principle when conducting operations in the Toolangi coupes.

Justice Osborne made some further comments in the judgment:

- He described VicForests’ case in regard to the economic and social impacts of the grant of an injunction with respect to the consequences of restraining logging at Gun Barrel as "less than compelling." (para. 337)
- He accepted that there is a strong case for the overall strategic review of the current reserve/exclusion zone system as a result of the 2009 fires. (para. 299)

VicForests made a commitment to exclude all Zone 1A in the three coupes from logging, to log Gun Barrel by the VRH system and not to conduct a regeneration burn. These two concessions greatly reduced the environmental damage done by the logging.

Costs were awarded against My Environment, but not on the higher scale (indemnity).

=== Calls for Great Forest National Park ===
In August 2013 Professor David Lindenmayer called for a new "Great Forest National Park" in the mountain forests east of Melbourne from Kinglake through to the Baw Baws, and north-east up to Eildon to protect them from logging.

"The last 30 years of work has shown that logging significantly degrades habitats for Leadbeater's possum and makes areas of forest unsuitable for 150 to 200 years. Logging has reduced the amount of old growth forest to less than 1 per cent of the forest cover."

"Now that's far worse than anything you would see in Tasmania, and so really what we've seen is a system that's at a state of collapse, possum populations in a state of collapse, and the industry itself is in a state of collapse."

=== The Little Red Toolangi Treehouse ===
A tree sit protest in The Little Red Toolangi Treehouse commenced in the Toolangi State Forest during November 2013. Hannah Patchett, moved into The Little Red Toolangi Treehouse of 20 November, motivated by the recommendation of Prof. David Lindenmayer, who called for an end to logging in the area by the end of December 2013 to provide Leadbeater's possum with a chance at avoiding extinction. Hannah pledged to remain in the 14-square-metre home until the Victorian state government announces plans for protecting the endangered possum. Hannah moved out for personal reasons and was replaced by Beee Mallia, another young conservationist.

Beee has endured all climatic variations since 1 December 2013 and is sacrificing creature comforts in an act of Non-Violent Direct Action to bring attention to the need to protect this unique and globally significant forest. The Little Red Toolangi Treehouse is also currently functioning as a point of engagement for the broader public. Further blockading against logging has since occurred in the area, such as a tree-sit in 2020.

=== VicForests announces logging of Tanglefoot and Myrtle Gully walking tracks ===
VicForests, the logging company owned by the Victorian government, has announced intentions to log forests along the highly valued Mount Tanglefoot and Myrtle Gully walking tracks. On 9 April 2022, members of ten community groups gathered at a rally to save the forest along these walking tracks from logging.

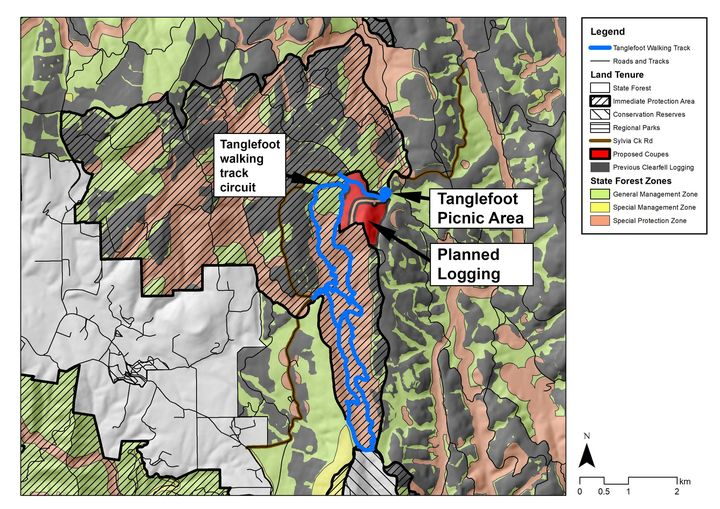
Map of proposed logging around Mount Tanglefoot track in 2022

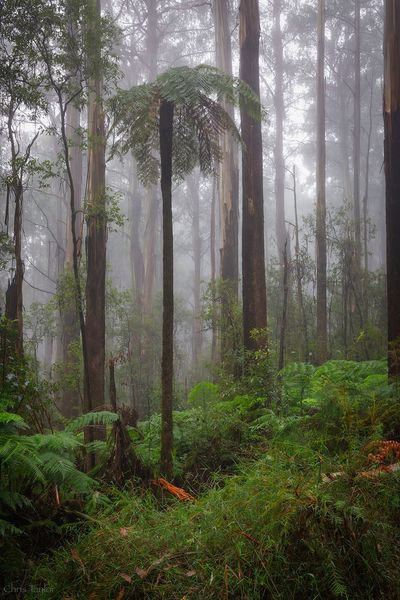
Forest along Mount Tanglefoot track

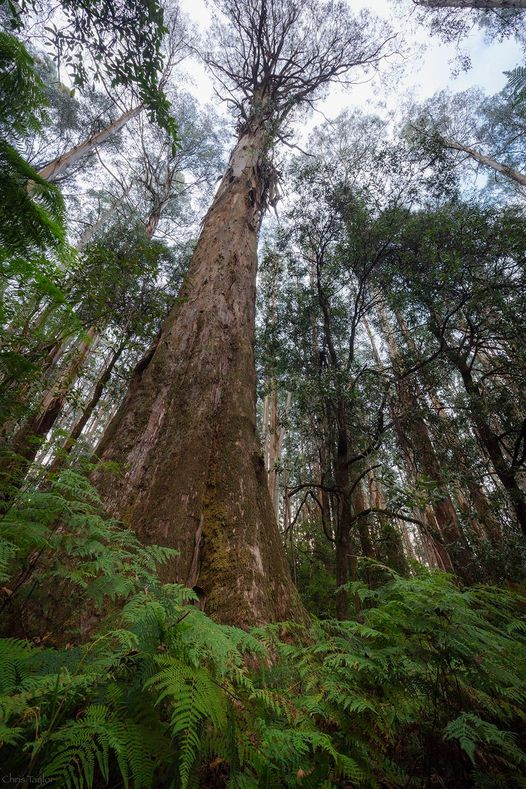
Mountain ash tree in Mount Tanglefoot track forest

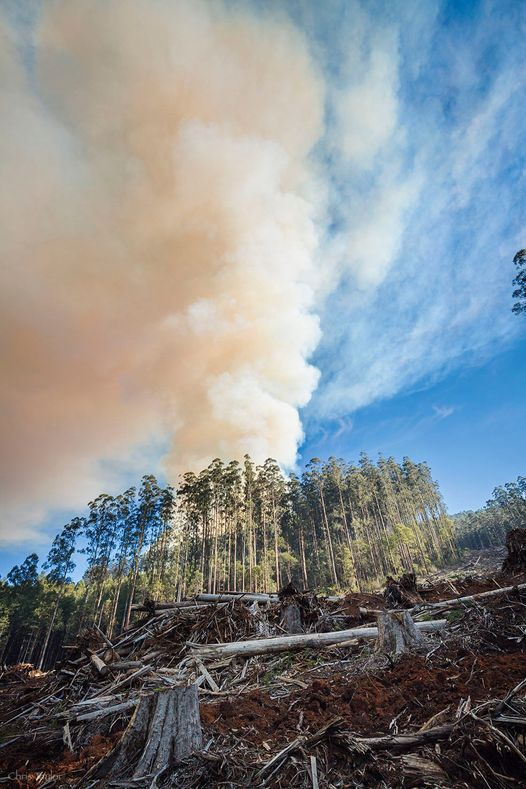
Burnoff after clearfell logging of native forest located 210m from beginning of Mount Tanglefoot track

== Gallery ==
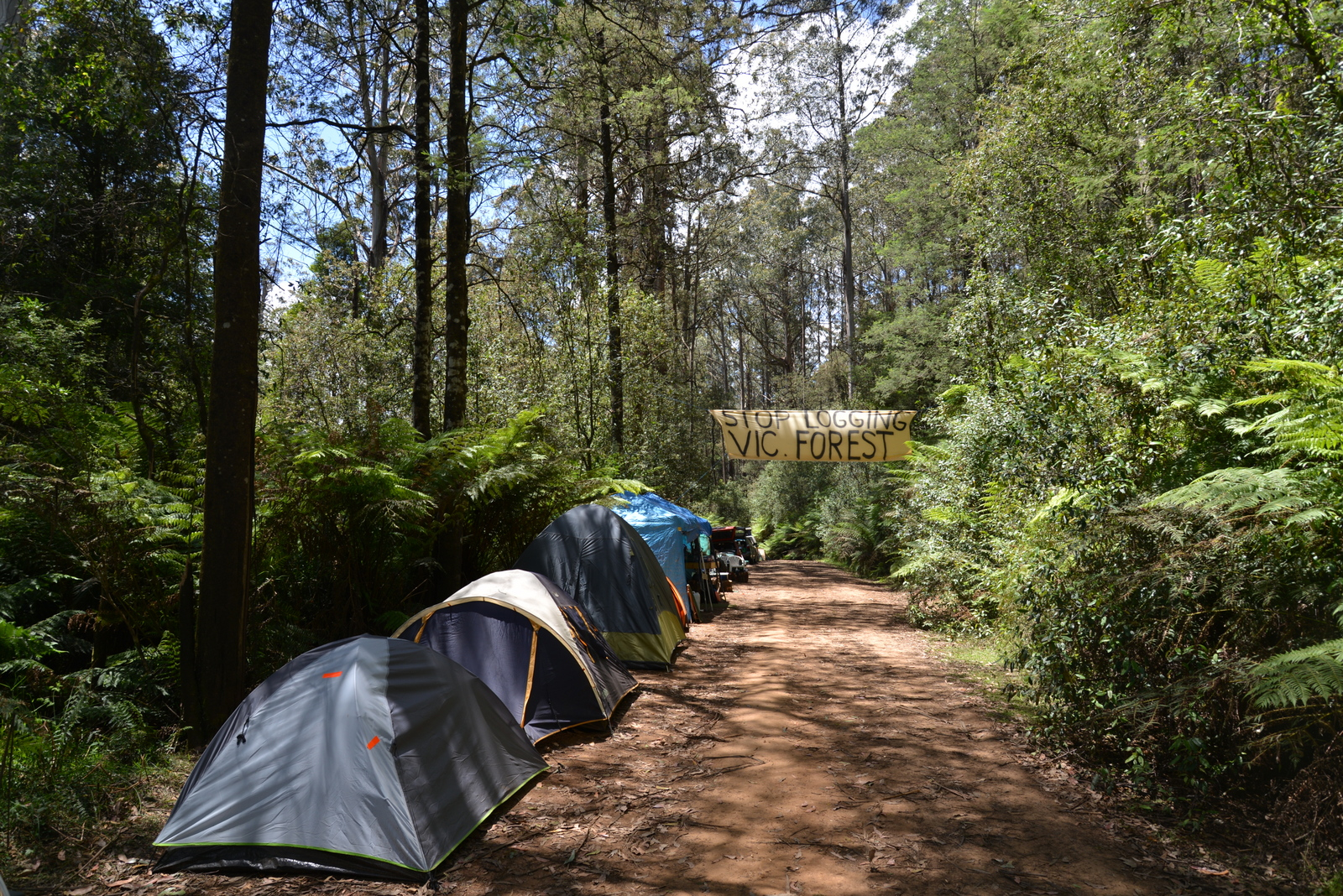
Little Red Toolangi Treehouse protest in Toolangi State Forest

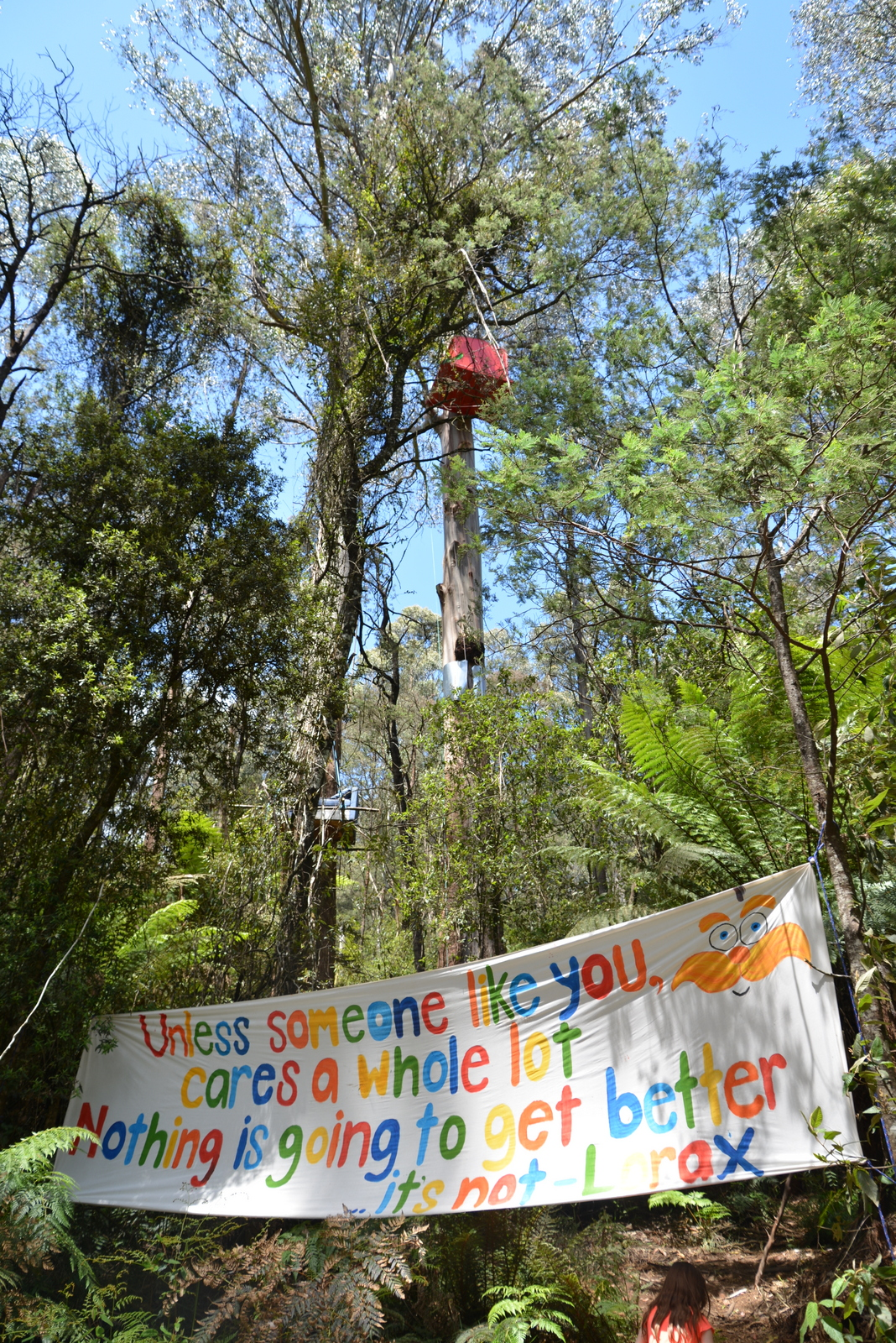
Little Red Toolangi Treehouse protest in Toolangi State Forest

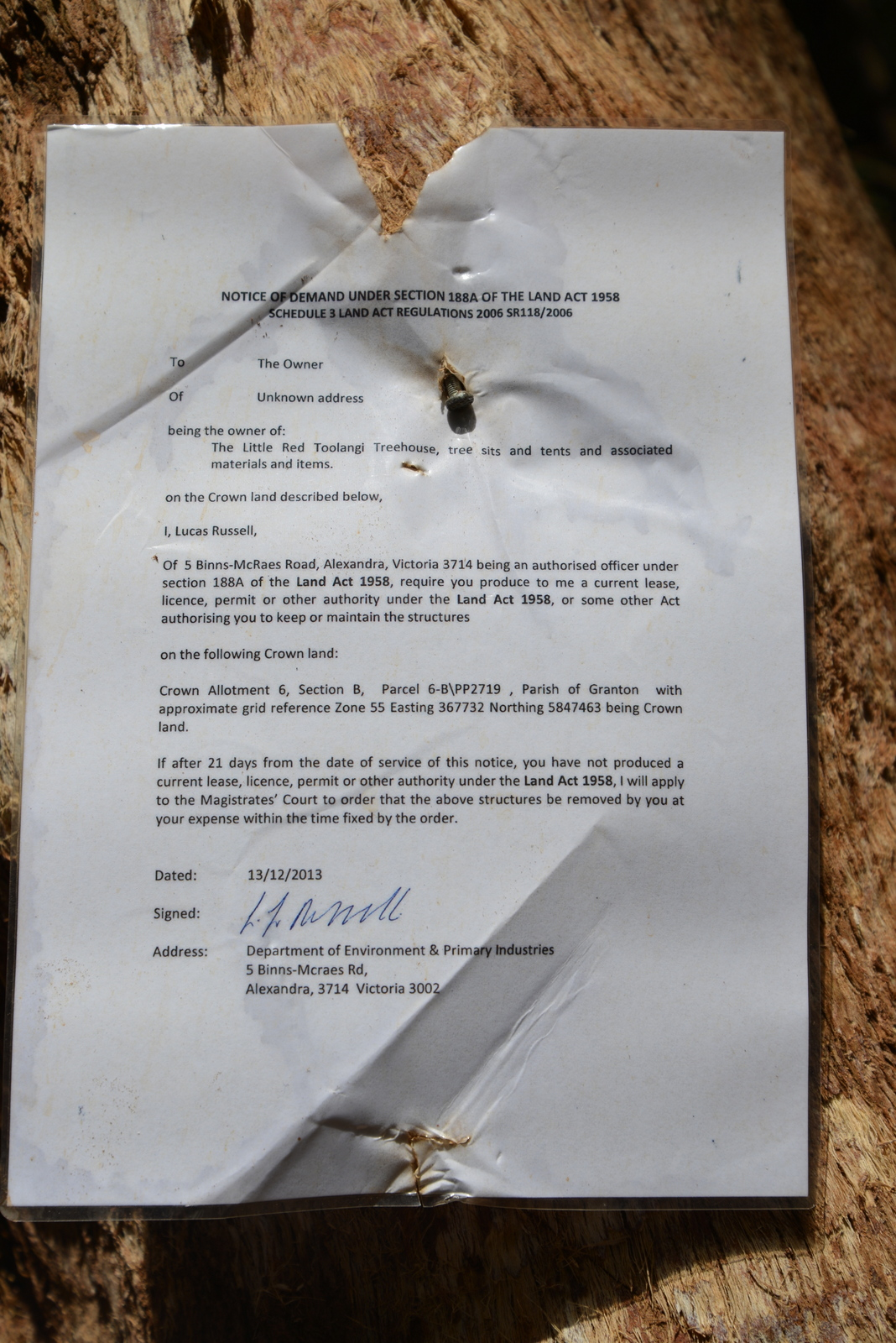
Little Red Toolangi Treehouse protest in Toolangi State Forest, Eviction notice

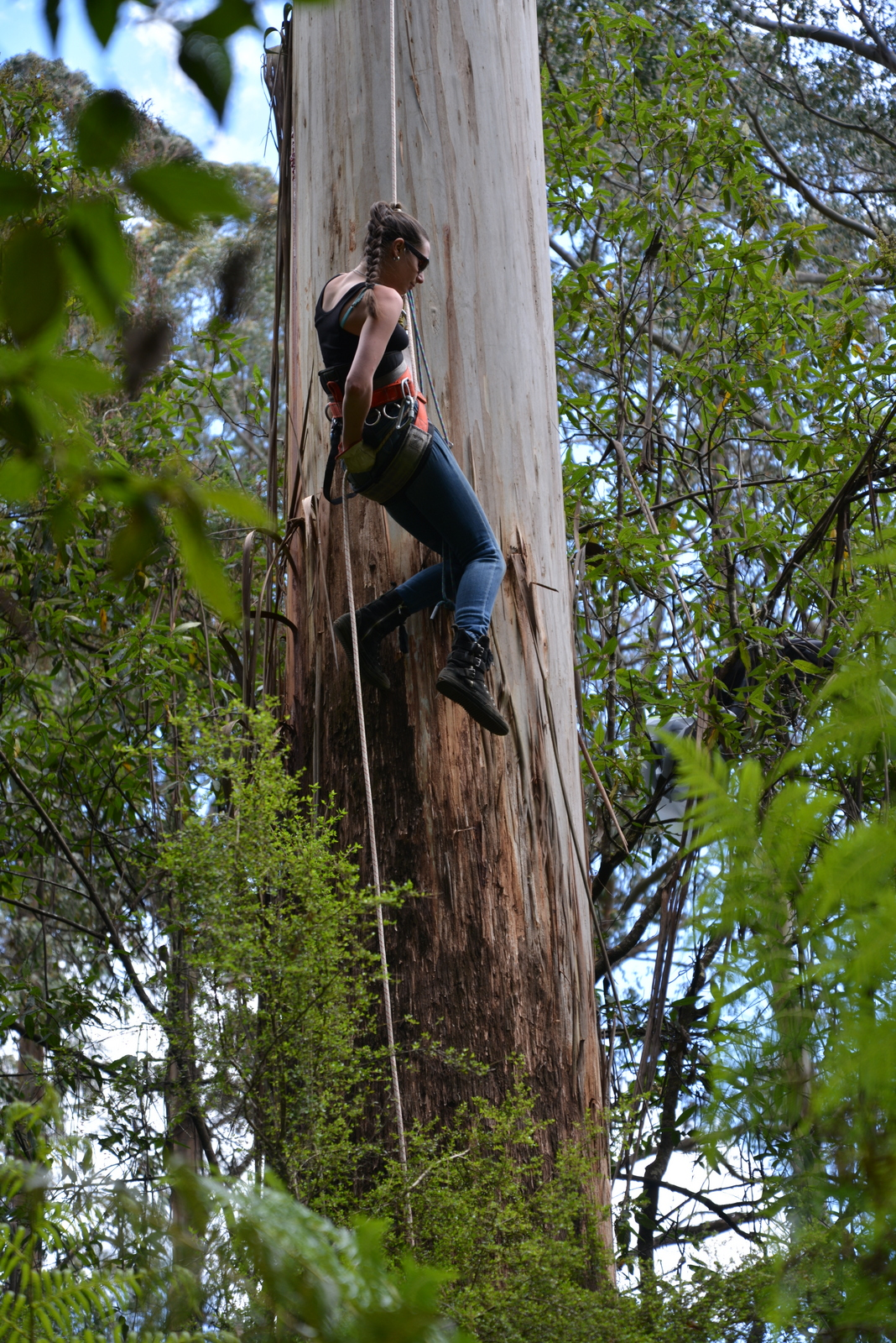
Little Red Toolangi Treehouse protest in Toolangi State Forest

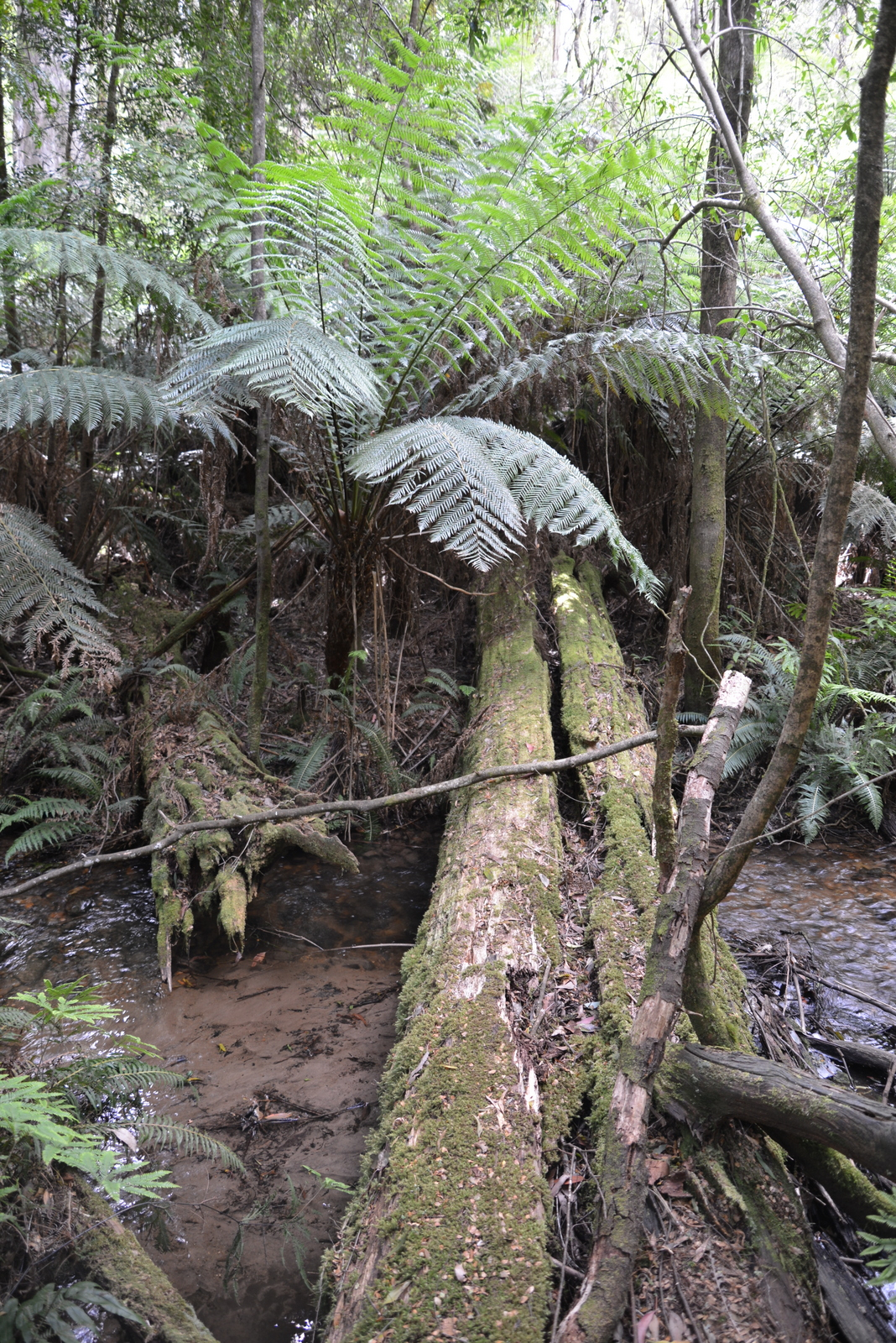
Yea River near Little Red Toolangi Treehouse protest in Toolangi State Forest

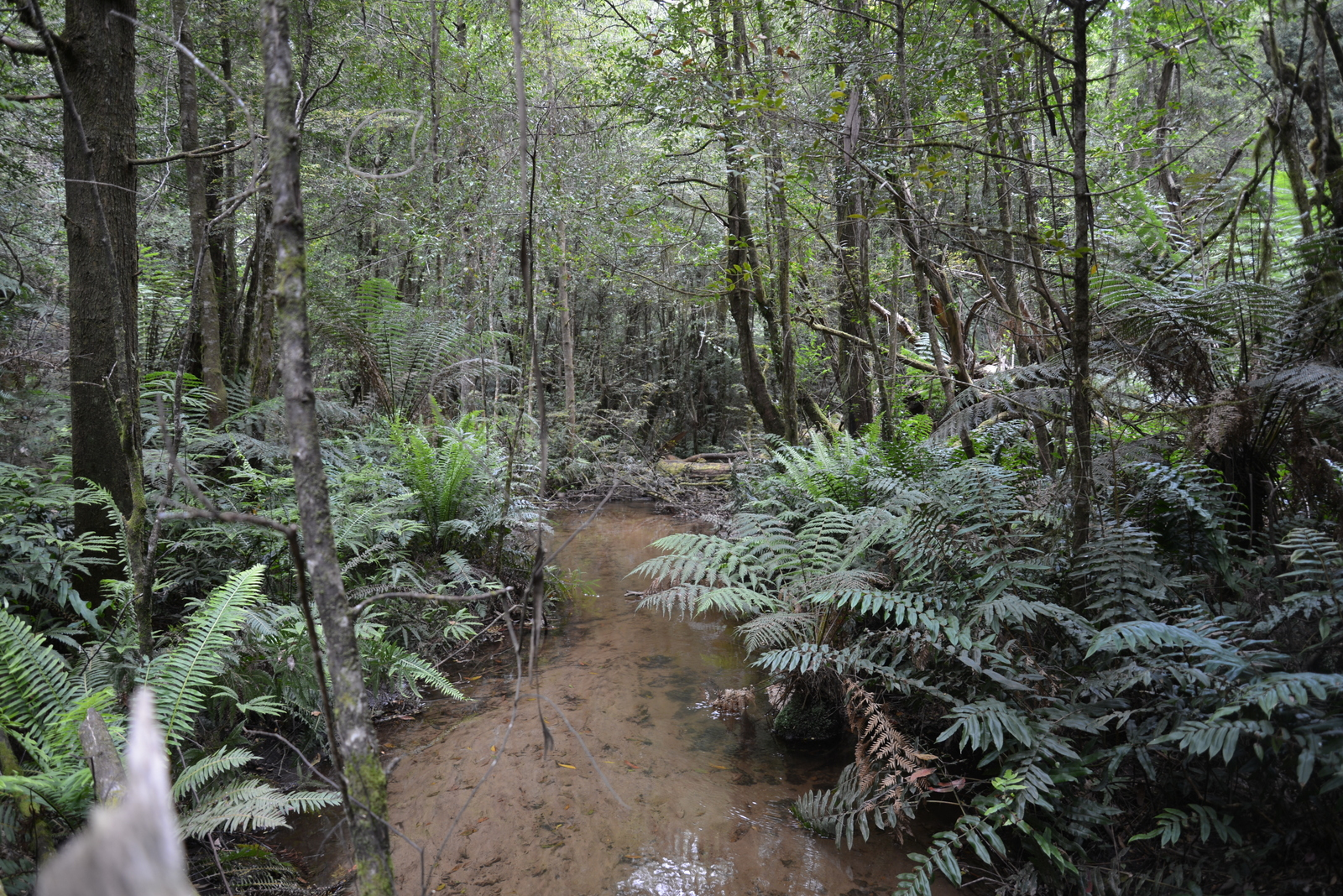
Yea River near Little Red Toolangi Treehouse protest in Toolangi State Forest

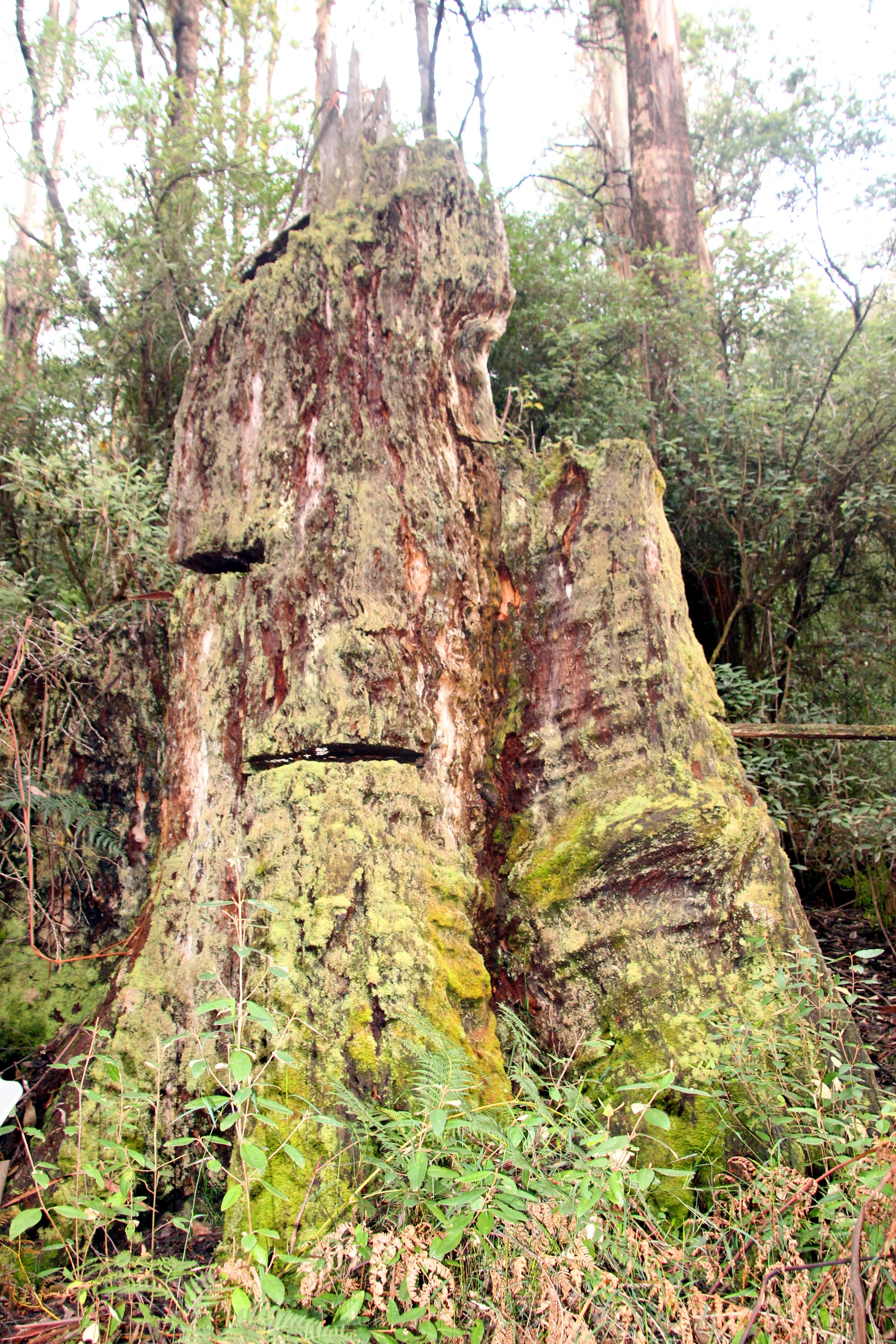
Sign of early logging of mountain ash, Kalatha giant tree walk, Sylvia Creek Rd, Toolangi, Victorian Central Highlands, Australia

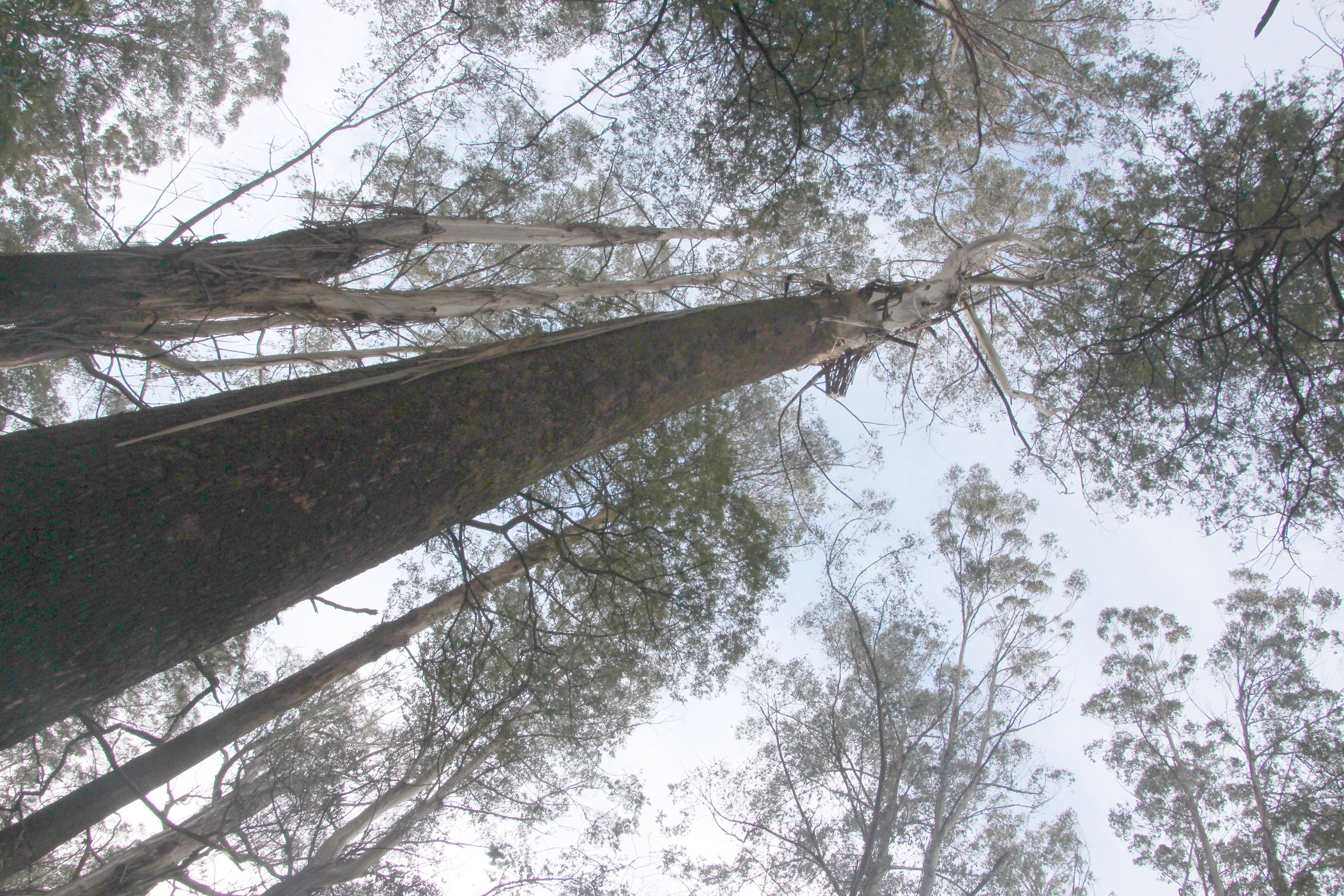
Reaching for the sky, Kalatha giant tree walk, Sylvia Creek Rd, Toolangi, Victorian Central Highlands, Australia

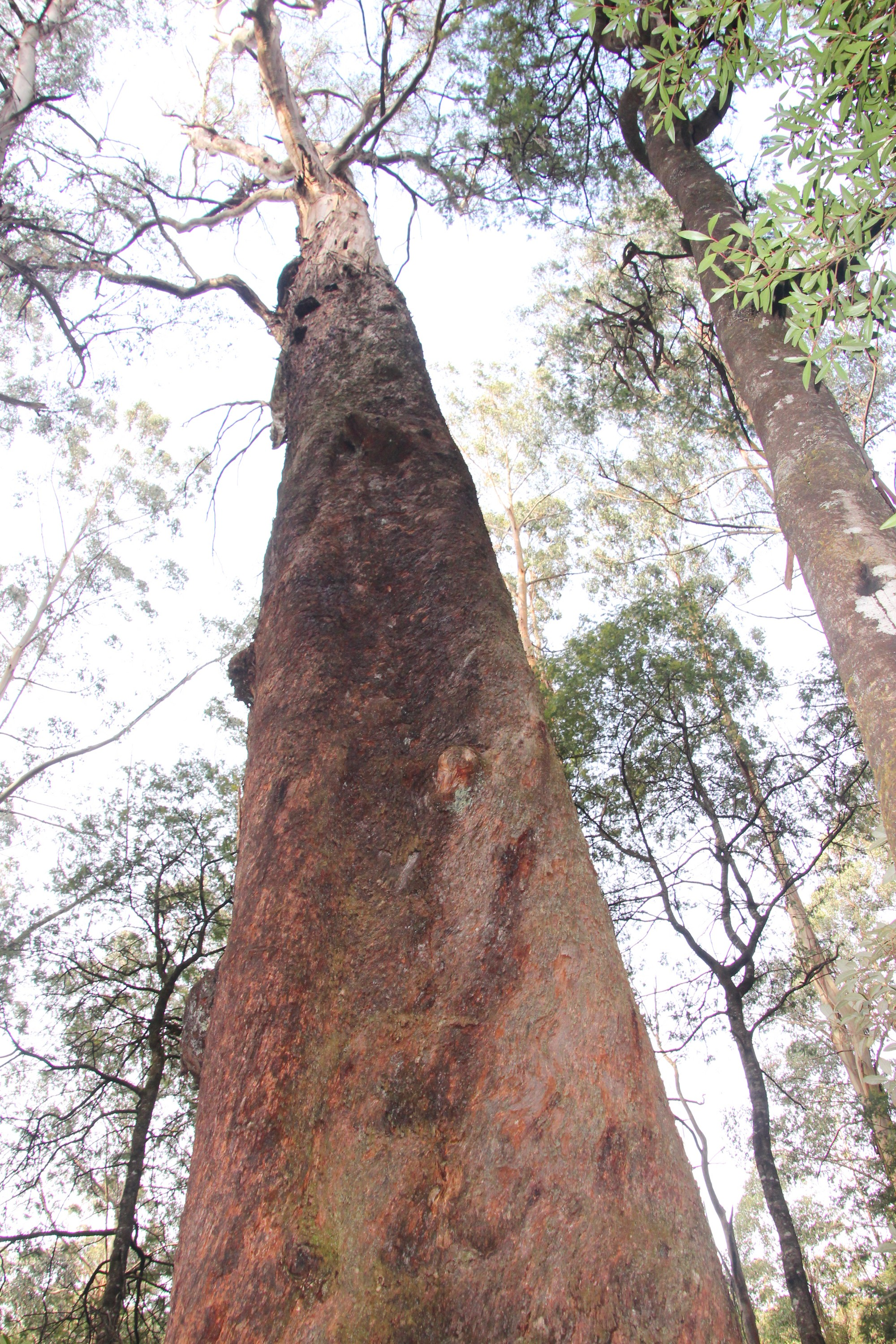
Reaching for the sky, Kalatha giant tree walk, Sylvia Creek Rd, Toolangi, Victorian Central Highlands, Australia

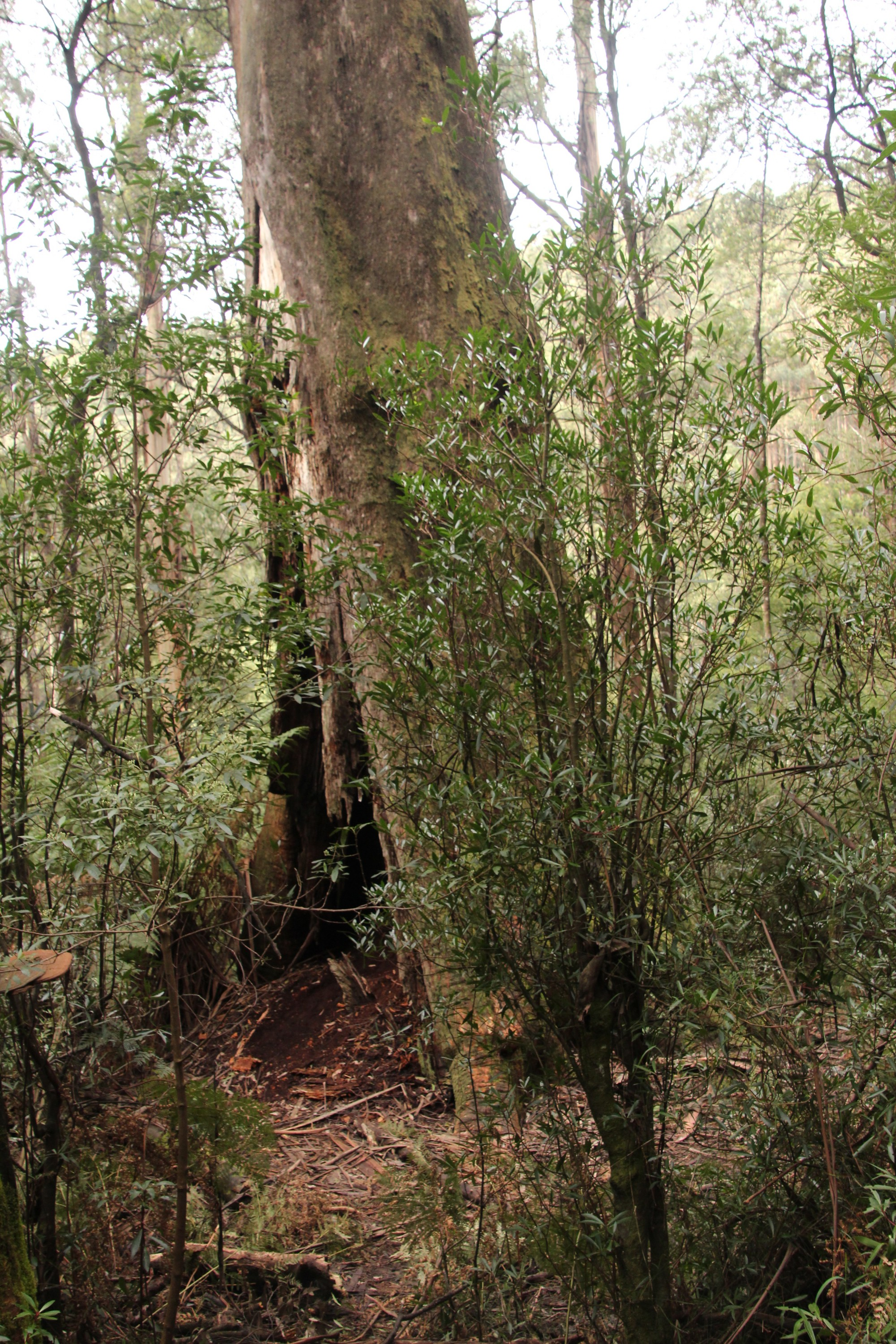
Kalatha tree base, Kalatha giant tree walk, Sylvia Creek Rd, Toolangi, Victorian Central Highlands, Australia

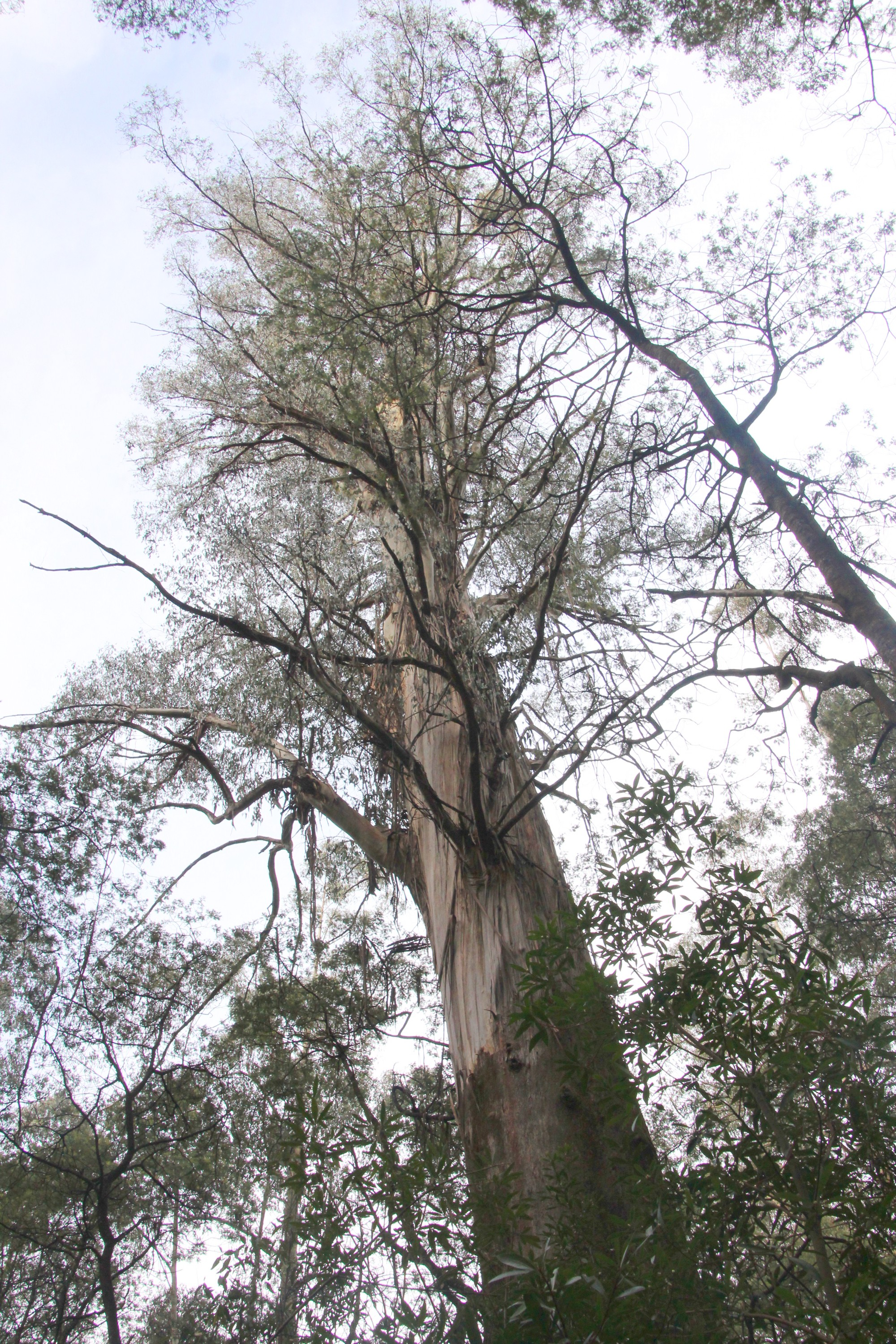
Kalatha tree canopy, Kalatha giant tree walk, Sylvia Creek Rd, Toolangi, Victorian Central Highlands, Australia

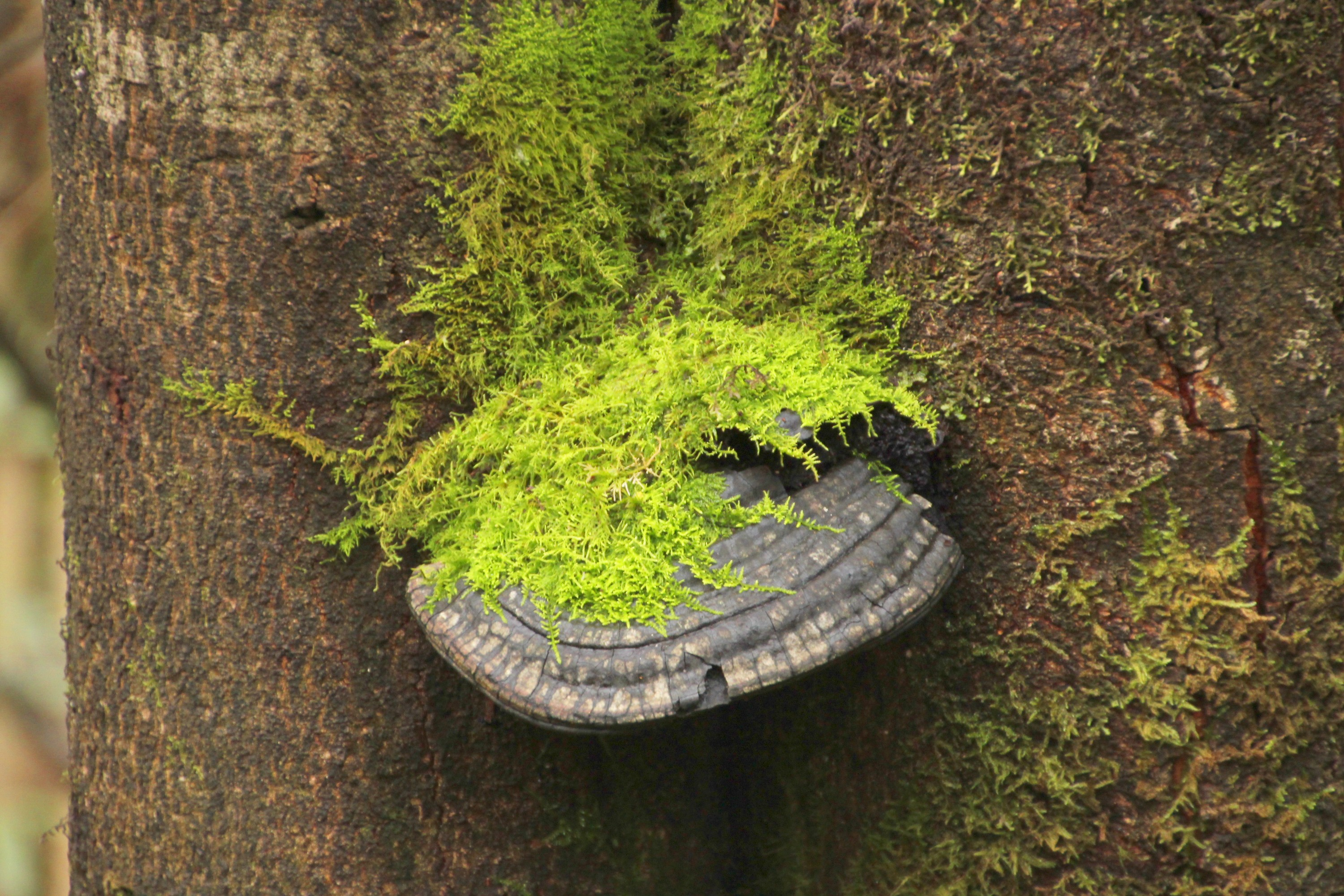
Fungus and moss on mountain ash trunk, Kalatha giant tree walk, Sylvia Creek Rd, Toolangi, Victorian Central Highlands, Australia
