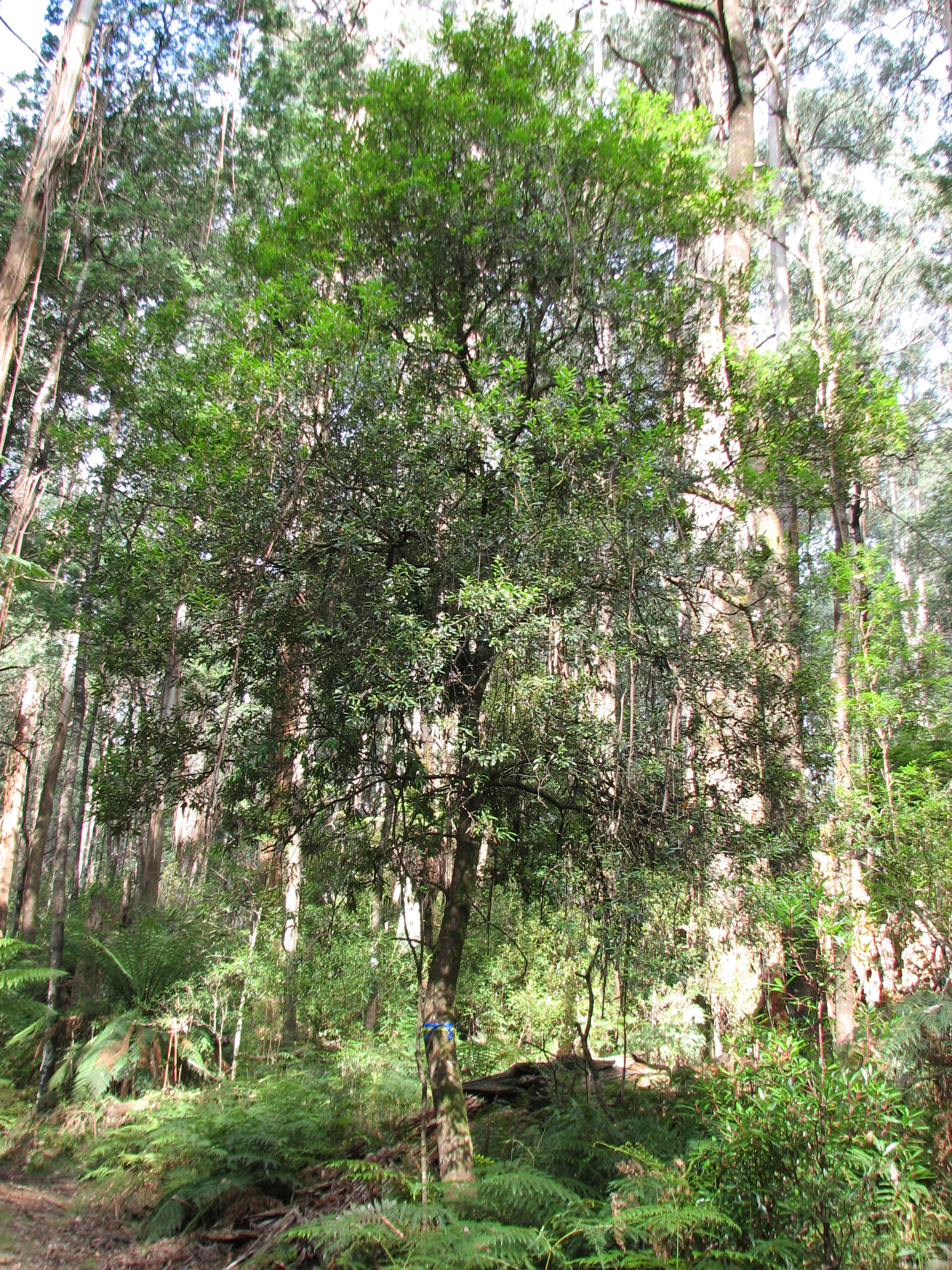
- Persoonia arborea in Toolangi State Forest

Scientific classification
- Kingdom: Plantae
- Clade: Tracheophytes
- Clade: Angiosperms
- Clade: Eudicots
- Order: Proteales
- Family: Proteaceae
- Genus: Persoonia
- Species: P. arborea

Binomial name
- Persoonia arborea F.Muell.
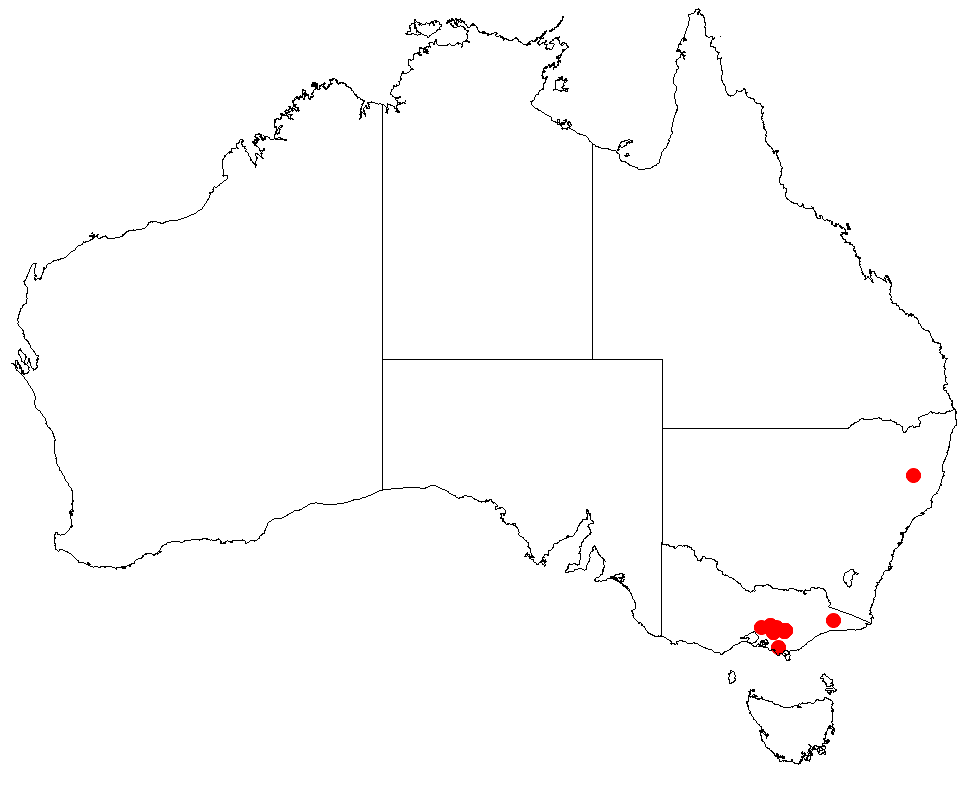
- Occurrence data from Australasian Virtual Herbarium

Synonyms
- Linkia arborea (F.Muell.) Kuntze

= Persoonia arborea =

Tree geebung

Species of shrub

Persoonia arborea, commonly known as tree geebung, is a species of large shrub or small tree that is endemic to Victoria, Australia.

== Description ==
Persoonia arborea is a large shrub or small tree that typically grows to a height of 3–14 m (9.8–45.9 ft), its young branchlets densely covered with greyish to rust-coloured hairs. The leaves are narrow spatula-shaped to lance-shaped with the narrower end towards the base, 40–100 mm (1.6–3.9 in) long and 6–21 mm (0.24–0.83 in) wide. The flowers are arranged singly in the axils of leaves on a pedicel up to 5 mm (0.20 in) long, the tepals 16–20 mm (0.63–0.79 in) long, hairy on the outside with a spine 1–2 mm (0.039–0.079 in) long on the end and white anthers. Flowering occurs from December to March and the fruit is a yellowish green, oval drupe up to about 14 mm (0.55 in) long and 12 mm (0.47 in) wide.

== Taxonomy ==
Persoonia arborea was first formally described in 1865 by Ferdinand von Mueller in the fifth volume of Fragmenta Phytographiae Australiae, based on material he collected from the "headwaters of the La Trobe and Yarra Rivers".

== Distribution and habitat ==
Tree geebung occurs in high rainfall mountain ash forest to the north-east of Melbourne at altitudes of 450–1,200 m (1,480–3,940 ft). It is listed as "vulnerable" on the Department of Sustainability and Environment's Advisory List of Rare Or Threatened Plants In Victoria. However, within its limited range it is relatively common, and is able to colonise disturbed areas. About 40% of its habitat lies within the Yarra Ranges National Park, while the remaining 60% occurs on public land utilised for logging.
