= Great Forest National Park =

Proposed national park in Victoria, Australia

Coordinates: 37°30′S 145°30′E

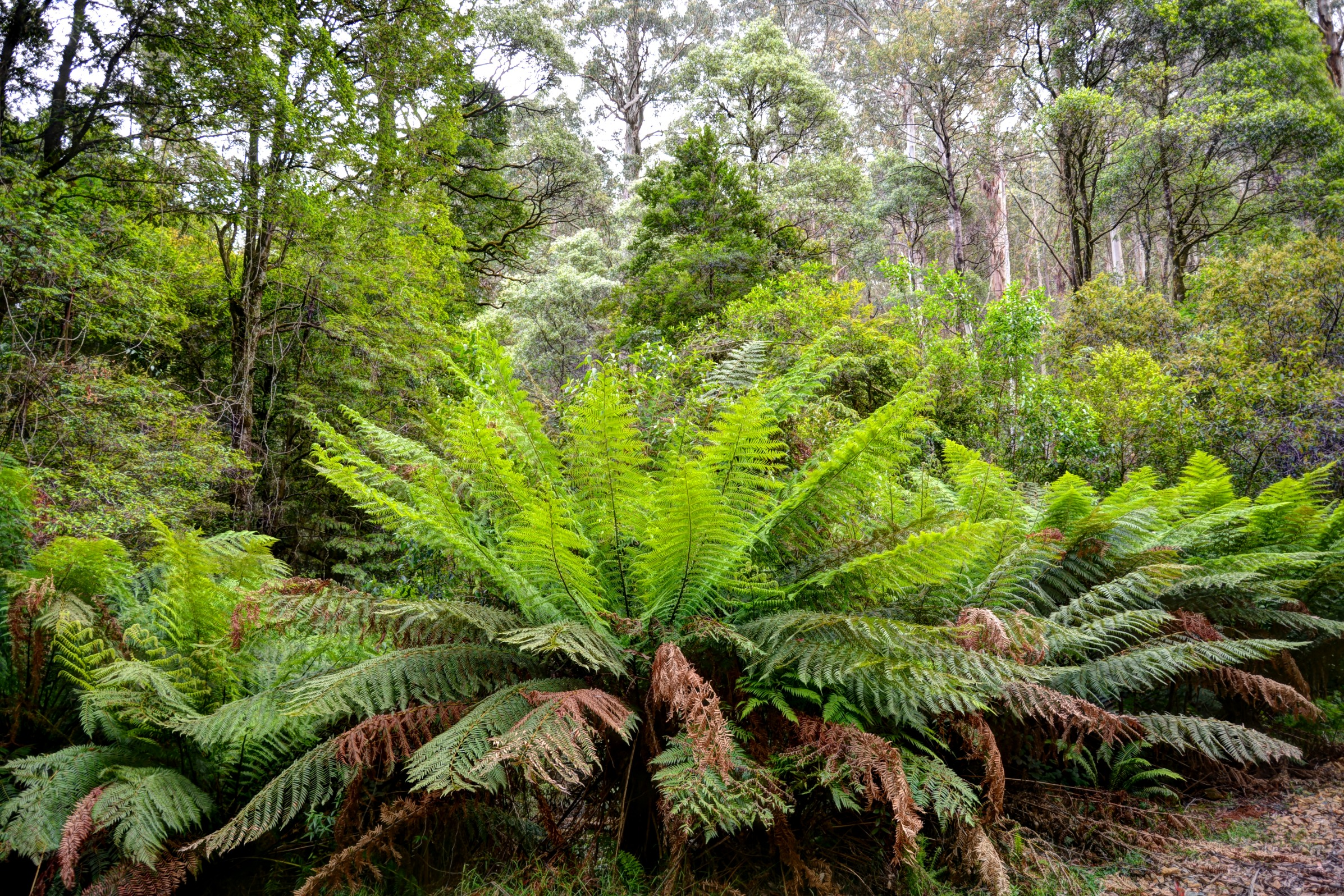
Toolangi State Forest, part of the proposed national park

The Great Forest National Park is a proposed national park in eastern Victoria, Australia. It is envisaged that the park would protect the forests of the Central Highlands and species of conservation concern such as the endangered Leadbeater's possum. The concept was developed by regional community groups and forest ecologists and researchers from Australian National University and the University of Melbourne.

== Proposed location ==
The park would extend between Kinglake National Park (west) and Baw Baw National Park (east), Lake Eildon National Park (north) and Bunyip State Park (south). It would encompass 355,000 hectares (880,000 acres), including the Yarra Ranges National Park and existing state forests such as the Cathedral Range State Park and Toolangi State Forest.

=== Analysis ===
A report produced by the Nous Group found that the establishment of the Great Forest National Park with three different investment scenarios could generate as much as 379,000 additional visitors to the region. The Report identified that investment could also lead to as much 740 new full-time jobs and added economic benefit of A$71.1 million in local GDP.

In November 2022, commission by the Victorian National Parks Association, a Lonergan poll taken in accordance with the ISO 20252 standard, and in compliance with the Australian Polling Council Quality Mark standards, found 76% of Victorians support the creation of the Great Forest National Park.

The proposal is supported by thirty environmental and scientific groups, including the Royal Society of Victoria, Australian Conservation Foundation and The Wilderness Society. Prominent environmentalists supporting the park include David Attenborough, Jane Goodall, Tim Flannery and Bob Brown.

The proposal was a key topic in the 2014 Victorian state election. While the incumbent Liberal-National Coalition ruled out support for any new national park, the proposal was supported by The Greens. The Labor Party was divided on the issue and did not actively support the plan during the election campaign. In 2015 environment minister Lisa Neville expressed support for the national park.

== See also ==
- Protected areas of Victoria
