= Occupancy frequency distribution =

In macroecology and community ecology, an occupancy frequency distribution (OFD) is the distribution of the numbers of species occupying different numbers of areas. It was first reported in 1918 by the Danish botanist Christen C. Raunkiær in his study on plant communities. The OFD is also known as the species-range size distribution in the literature.

== Bimodality ==
A typical form of OFD is a bimodal distribution, indicating the species in a community is either rare or common, known as Raunkiaer's law of distribution of frequencies. That is, with each species assigned to one of five 20%-wide occupancy classes, Raunkiaer's law predicts bimodal distributions within homogenous plant formations with modes in the first (0-20%) and last (81-100%) classes. Although Raunkiaer's law has long been discounted as an index of plant community homogeneity, the method of using occupancy classes to construct OFDs is still commonly used for both plant and animal assemblages. Henry Gleason commented on this law in a 1929 Ecology article: "In conclusion we may say that Raunkiaer's law is merely an expression of the fact that in any association there are more species with few individuals than with many, that the law is most apparent when quadrats are chosen of the most serviceable size to show frequency, and that it is obscured or lost if the quadrats are either too large or too small." Evidently, there are different shapes of OFD found in literature. Tokeshi reported that approximately 46% of observations have a right-skewed unimodal shape, 27% bimodal, and 27% uniform. A recent study reaffirms about 24% bimodal OFDs in among 289 real communities.

== Factors ==
As pointed out by Gleason, the variety shapes of OFD can be explained, to a large degree, by the size of the sampling interval. For instance, McGeoch and Gaston (2002) show that the number of satellite (rare) species declines with the increase of sampling grains, but the number of core (common) species increases, showing a tendency from a bimodal OFD towards a right-skewed unimodal distribution. This is because species range, measured as occupancy, is strongly affected by the spatial scale and its aggregation structure, known often as the scaling pattern of occupancy. Such scale dependence of occupancy has a profound effect on other macroecological patterns, such as the occupancy-abundance relationship.

Other factors that have been proposed to be able to affect the shape of OFD include the degree of habitat heterogeneity, species specificity, landscape productivity, position in the geographic range, species dispersal ability and the extinction–colonization dynamics.

== Mechanisms ==
Three basic models have been proposed to explain the bimodality found in occupancy frequency distributions.

=== Sampling results ===
Random sampling of individuals from either lognormal or log-series rank abundance distributions (where random choice of an individual from a given species was proportional to its frequency) may produce bimodal occupancy distributions. This model is not particularly sensitive or informative as to the mechanisms generating bimodality in occupancy frequency distributions, because the mechanisms generating the lognormal species abundance distribution are still under heavy debate.

=== Core-satellite hypothesis ===
Bimodality may be generated by colonization-extinction metapopulation dynamics associated with a strong rescue effect. This model is appropriate to explain the range structure of a community that is influenced by metapopulation processes, such as dispersal and local extinction. However, it is not robust because the shape of the occupancy frequency distribution generated by this model is highly sensitive to species immigration and extinction parameters. The metapopulation model does also not explain scale dependence in the occupancy frequency distribution.

=== Occupancy probability transition ===
The third model that describes bimodality in the occupancy frequency distribution is based on the scaling pattern of occupancy under a self-similar assumption of species distributions (called the occupancy probability transition [OPT] model). The OPT model is based on Harte et al.'s bisection scheme (although not on their probability rule) and the recursion probability of occupancy at different scales. The OPT model has been shown to support two empirical observations:

1. That bimodality is prevalent in interspecific occupancy frequency distributions.
2. that the number of satellite species in the distribution increases towards finer scales.

The OPT model demonstrates that the sample grain of a study, sampling adequacy, and the distribution of species saturation coefficients (a measure of the fractal dimensionality of a species distribution) in a community are together largely able to explain the patterns commonly found in empirical occupancy distributions. Hui and McGeoch (2007) further show that the self-similarity in species distributions breaks down according to a power relationship with spatial scales, and we therefore adopt a power-scaling assumption for modeling species occupancy distributions. The bimodality in occupancy frequency distributions that is common in species communities, is confirmed to a result for certain mathematical and statistical properties of the probability distribution of occupancy. The results thus demonstrate that the use of the bisection method in combination with a power-scaling assumption is more appropriate for modeling species distributions than the use of a self-similarity assumption, particularly at fine scales. This model further provokes the Harte-Maddux debate: Harte et al. demonstrated that the power law form of the species–area relationship may be derived from a bisected, self-similar landscape and a community-level probability rule. However, Maddux showed that this self-similarity model generates biologically unrealistic predictions. Hui and McGeoch (2008) resolve the Harte–Maddux debate by demonstrating that the problems identified by Maddux result from an assumption that the probability of occurrence of a species at one scale is independent of its probability of occurrence at the next, and further illustrate the importance of considering patterns of species co-occurrence, and the way in which species occupancy patterns change with scale, when modeling species distributions.

== See also ==
- Rank abundance curve
