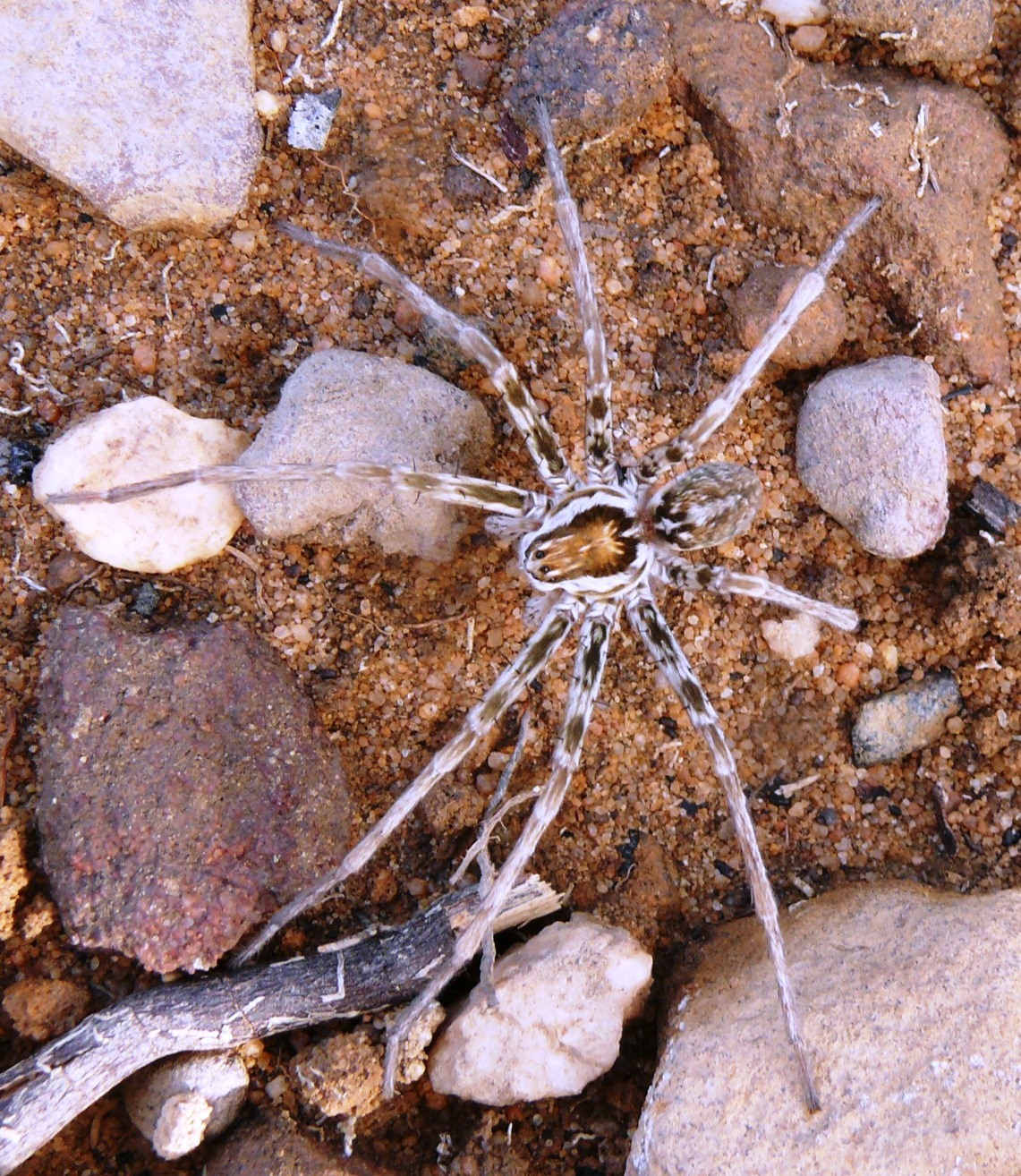
- A. deserticola from South Africa

Scientific classification
- Kingdom: Animalia
- Phylum: Arthropoda
- Subphylum: Chelicerata
- Class: Arachnida
- Order: Araneae
- Infraorder: Araneomorphae
- Family: Sparassidae
- Genus: Arandisa; Lawrence, 1938
- Species: A. deserticola

Binomial name
- Arandisa deserticola Lawrence, 1938

= Arandisa =

Genus of spiders

Arandisa is a monotypic genus of Namibian huntsman spiders containing the single species, Arandisa deserticola. It was first described by R. F. Lawrence in 1938, and is found in Namibia.

== Distribution ==
Arandisa deserticola is distributed across Namibia and South Africa. In South Africa, the species is known from the Northern Cape province, specifically from Augrabies National Park, Benfontein Nature Reserve, and Tswalu Kalahari Reserve.

== Habitat and ecology ==
The species is a ground dweller found in the Savanna and Succulent Karoo biomes at elevations ranging from 567 to 1,172 m above sea level. It inhabits arid environments across its range.

== Description ==
Arandisa deserticola is a rare, small desert-dwelling Huntsman spider. It is a small species of huntsman spider, based on a female holotype, growing at least 10.8 millimetres (0.43 in) in carapace length; The base color of the spider is a light yellowish brown, it has a flattened carapace which mimicks other spider species such as wall-crab spiders (Selenopidae). It has no significant predators, and it's Conservation Status is Least Concern (IUCN Red List of Ecosystems).

== Conservation ==
Arandisa deserticola is listed as least concern by the South African National Biodiversity Institute due to its wide geographical range. The species is protected in three protected areas including Augrabies National Park, Benfontein Nature Reserve, and Tswalu Kalahari Reserve. There are no significant threats to the species.

== Taxonomy ==
The species was originally described by R. F. Lawrence in 1938 from Namibia. The taxonomic description was based on juvenile specimens, but illustrations of genitalia were later provided by Jäger & Kunz (2005). The species has not been revised since its original description.
