= AOO =

AOO may refer to:

- All Over Ornamented, a pottery style in prehistoric European Beaker culture
- Altoona–Blair County Airport IATA code
- Apache OpenOffice
- Area of Occupancy, another term for scaling pattern of occupancy, the way in which species distribution changes across spatial scales
- African Orange Order, Protestant fraternity
