= Scaling pattern of occupancy =

In spatial ecology and macroecology, scaling pattern of occupancy (SPO), also known as the area-of-occupancy (AOO) is the way in which species distribution changes across spatial scales. In physical geography and image analysis, it is similar to the modifiable areal unit problem. Simon A. Levin (1992) states that the problem of relating phenomena across scales is the central problem in biology and in all of science. Understanding the SPO is thus one central theme in ecology.

== Pattern description ==
This pattern is often plotted as log-transformed grain (cell size) versus log-transformed occupancy. Kunin (1998) presented a log-log linear SPO and suggested a fractal nature for species distributions. It has since been shown to follow a logistic shape, reflecting a percolation process. Furthermore, the SPO is closely related to the intraspecific occupancy-abundance relationship. For instance, if individuals are randomly distributed in space, the number of individuals in an α-size cell follows a Poisson distribution, with the occupancy being P_{α} = 1 − exp(−μα), where μ is the density. Clearly, P_{α} in this Poisson model for randomly distributed individuals is also the SPO. Other probability distributions, such as the negative binomial distribution, can also be applied for describing the SPO and the occupancy-abundance relationship for non-randomly distributed individuals.

Other occupancy-abundance models that can be used to describe the SPO includes Nachman's exponential model, Hanski and Gyllenberg's metapopulation model, He and Gaston's improved negative binomial model by applying Taylor's power law between the mean and variance of species distribution, and Hui and McGeoch's droopy-tail percolation model. One important application of the SPO in ecology is to estimate species abundance based on presence-absence data, or occupancy alone. This is appealing because obtaining presence-absence data is often cost-efficient. Using a dipswitch test consisting of 5 subtests and 15 criteria, Hui et al. confirmed that using the SPO is robust and reliable for assemblage-scale regional abundance estimation. The other application of SPOs includes trends identification in populations, which is extremely valuable for biodiversity conservation.

== Explanation ==
Models providing explanations to the observed scaling pattern of occupancy include the fractal model, the cross-scale model and the Bayesian estimation model. The fractal model can be configured by dividing the landscape into quadrats of different sizes, or bisecting into grids with special width-to-length ratio (2:1), and yields the following SPO:

$$P_a=P_0 a^{D/2-1} \,$$

where D is the box-counting fractal dimension. If during each step a quadrat is divided into q sub-quadrats, we will find a constant portion (f) of sub-quadrats is also present in the fractal model, i.e. D = 2(1 + log ƒ/log q). Since this assumption that f is scale independent is not always the case in nature, a more general form of ƒ can be assumed, ƒ = q^{−λ} (λ is a constant), which yields the cross-scale model:

$$P_{a_j}=f_0 f_1 \cdots  f_j. \,$$

The Bayesian estimation model follows a different way of thinking. Instead of providing the best-fit model as above, the occupancy at different scales can be estimated by Bayesian rule based on not only the occupancy but also the spatial autocorrelation at one specific scale. For the Bayesian estimation model, Hui et al. provide the following formula to describe the SPO and join-count statistics of spatial autocorrelation:

$$p\,{(4a)_+}=1 - \frac{{\Omega }^4}{\mho }$$

$$q\,{(4a)_{+/+}}=\frac{{\Omega }^{10} -
2\,{\Omega }^4\,
{\mho }^2 + {\mho }^3}
{{\mho }^2\,
\left( -{\Omega }^4 +
\mho  \right) }$$

where Ω = p(a)_{0} − q(a)_{0/+}p(a)_{+} and $\mho$ = p(a)_{0}(1 − p(a)_{+}^{2}(2q(a)_{+/+} − 3) + p(a)_{+}(q(a)_{+/+}^{2} − 3)). p(a)_{+} is occupancy; q(a)_{+/+} is the conditional probability that a randomly chosen adjacent quadrat of an occupied quadrat is also occupied. The conditional probability q(a)_{0/+} = 1 − q(a)_{+/+} is the absence probability in a quadrate adjacent to an occupied one; a and 4a are the grains. The R-code of the Bayesian estimation model has been provided elsewhere. The key point of the Bayesian estimation model is that the scaling pattern of species distribution, measured by occupancy and spatial pattern, can be extrapolated across scales. Later on, Hui provides the Bayesian estimation model for continuously changing scales:

$$P_a = 1-b c^{2a^{1/2}} h^a \,$$

where b, c, and h are constants. This SPO becomes the Poisson model when b = c = 1. In the same paper, the scaling pattern of join-count spatial autocorrelation and multi-species association (or co-occurrence) were also provided by the Bayesian model, suggesting that "the Bayesian model can grasp the statistical essence of species scaling patterns."

== Implications for biological conservation ==
The probability of species extinction and ecosystem collapse increases rapidly as range size declines. In risk assessment protocols such as the IUCN Red List of Species or the IUCN Red List of Ecosystems, area of occupancy (AOO) is used as a standardized, complementary and widely applicable measure of risk spreading against spatially explicit threats.
