= Cang Hui =

Chinese ecologist (born 1977)

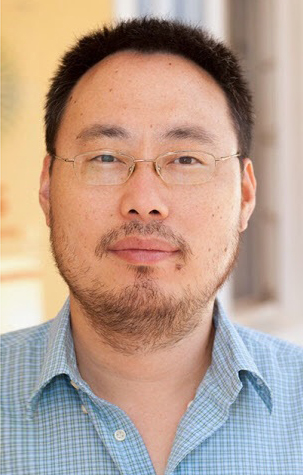
- Cang Hui in 2014
- Education: Xi'an Jiaotong University Lanzhou University
- Scientific career
- Fields: Mathematical Ecology
- Workplaces: Stellenbosch University

Cang Hui (Chinese: 惠蒼) is a mathematical ecologist at Stellenbosch University. His research interests are proposing models and theories for explaining emerging patterns of biodiversity, networks and adaptive traits in ecology and evolution.

== Background ==
Hui was born in Xi'an and received his BSc (1998) in applied mathematics from Xi'an Jiaotong University, his MSc (2001) in applied mathematics from Lanzhou University, and his PhD (2004) in mathematical ecology from the same university. Hui was a researcher at the DST-NRF Centre of Excellence for Invasion Biology from 2008 to 2013, and has remained a core-team member of the center since. Hui was appointed visiting professor in the MOE Key Laboratory of Western China's Environmental Systems (also known as the Research School of Arid Environment & Climate Change) from 2006 to 2009 and adjunct professor since 2011 at Lanzhou University. In January 2014, Hui was promoted to full professor in the Department of Mathematical Sciences at Stellenbosch University for his appointment as the South African Research Chair in Mathematical & Theoretical Physical Biosciences by the National Research Foundation of South Africa. This appointment is co-hosted by the African Institute for Mathematical Sciences, located in Cape Town.

In 2011 he was awarded the Elsevier Young Scientist Award at the National Research Foundation of South Africa.

== Major works ==
In 2021, Hui and colleague David Mark Richardson published the book Invading Ecological Networks. This volume defines an agenda for Invasion Science 2.0 by providing new framings and classification of research topics and by offering tentative solutions to vexing problems. In particular, it conceptualises a transformative ecosystem as an open adaptive network with critical transitions and turnover, with resident species heuristically learning and fine-tuning their niches and roles in a multiplayer eco-evolutionary game. It erects signposts pertaining to network interactions, structures, stability, dynamics, scaling, and invasibility.

In 2018, Hui and colleagues published the book Ecological and Evolutionary Modelling. The book introduces key concepts in ecology and evolution, explains classic and recent important mathematical models for investigating ecological and evolutionary dynamics, and provides real examples in ecology that have used these models to address relevant issues. Ecology studies biodiversity in its variety and complexity.

In 2017, Hui and colleague David Mark Richardson published the book Invasion Dynamics. The book depicts how non-native species spread and perform in their novel ranges and how recipient socio-ecological systems are reshaped and how they respond to the new incursions.
