= Ecosystem collapse =

Ecological communities abruptly losing biodiversity, often irreversibly

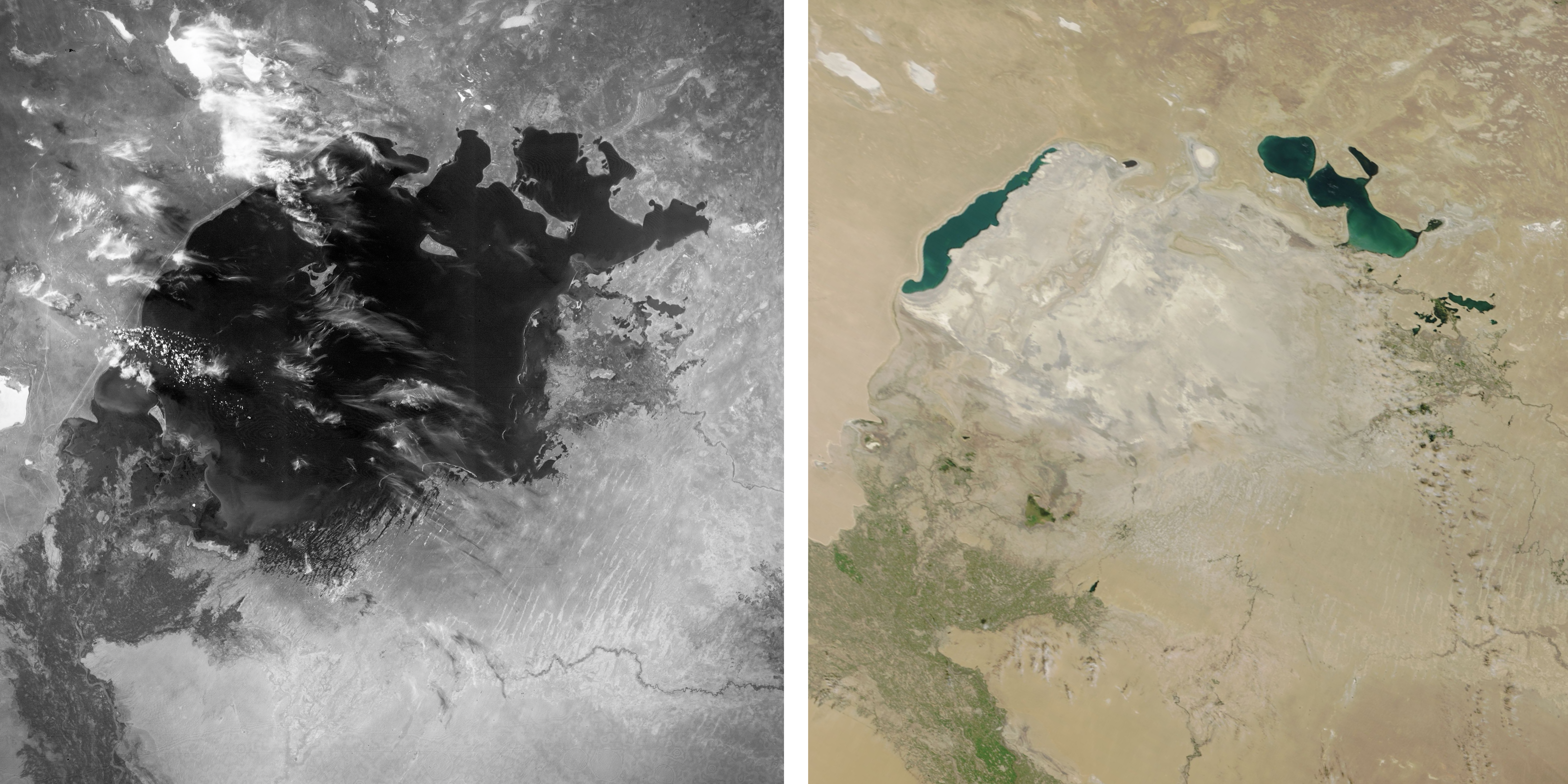
Image of the Aral Sea in August 22, 1964 (left) and August 25, 2026. The Aral Sea is an example of a collapsed ecosystem. (image source: NASA)

An ecosystem, short for ecological system, is defined as a collection of interacting organisms within a biophysical environment. Ecosystems are never static, and are continually subject to both stabilizing and destabilizing processes. Stabilizing processes allow ecosystems to adequately respond to destabilizing changes, or perturbations, in ecological conditions, or to recover from degradation induced by them. Yet, if destabilizing processes become strong enough or fast enough to cross a critical threshold within that ecosystem, often described as an ecological 'tipping point', then an ecosystem collapse (sometimes also termed ecological collapse) occurs.

Ecosystem collapse does not mean total disappearance of life from the area, but it does result in the loss of the original ecosystem's defining characteristics, typically including the ecosystem services it may have provided. Collapse of an ecosystem is effectively irreversible more often than not, and even if the reversal is possible, it tends to be slow and difficult. Ecosystems with low resilience may collapse even during a comparatively stable time, which then typically leads to their replacement with a more resilient system in the biosphere. However, even resilient ecosystems may disappear during the times of rapid environmental change, and study of the fossil record was able to identify how certain ecosystems went through a collapse, such as with the Carboniferous rainforest collapse or the collapse of Lake Baikal and Lake Hovsgol ecosystems during the Last Glacial Maximum.

Today, the ongoing Holocene extinction is caused primarily by human impact on the environment, and the greatest biodiversity loss so far had been due to habitat degradation and fragmentation, which eventually destroys entire ecosystems if left unchecked. There have been multiple notable examples of such an ecosystem collapse in the recent past, such as the collapse of the Atlantic northwest cod fishery. More are likely to occur without a change in course, since estimates show that 87% of oceans and 77% of the land surface have been altered by humanity, with 30% of global land area is degraded and a global decline in ecosystem resilience. Deforestation of the Amazon rainforest is the most dramatic example of a massive, continuous ecosystem and a biodiversity hotspot being under the immediate threat from habitat destruction through logging, and the less-visible, yet ever-growing and persistent threat from climate change.

Biological conservation can help to preserve threatened species and threatened ecosystems alike. However, time is of the essence. Just as interventions to preserve a species have to occur before it falls below viable population limits, at which point an extinction debt occurs regardless of what comes after, efforts to protect ecosystems must occur in response to early warning signals, before the tipping point to a regime shift is crossed. Further, there is a substantial gap between the extent of scientific knowledge how extinctions occur, and the knowledge about how ecosystems collapse. While there have been efforts to create objective criteria used to determine when an ecosystem is at risk of collapsing, they are comparatively recent, and are not yet as comprehensive. While the IUCN Red List of threatened species has existed for decades, the IUCN Red List of Ecosystems has only been in development since 2008.

== Definition ==
Ecosystem collapse has been defined as a "transformation of identity, loss of defining features, and replacement by a novel ecosystem", and involves the loss of "defining biotic or abiotic features", including the ability to sustain the species which used to be associated with that ecosystem. According to another definition, it is "a change from a baseline state beyond the point where an ecosystem has lost key defining features and functions, and is characterised by declining spatial extent, increased environmental degradation, decreases in, or loss of, key species, disruption of biotic processes, and ultimately loss of ecosystem services and functions". Ecosystem collapse has also been described as "an analogue of species extinction", and in many cases, it is irreversible, with a new ecosystem appearing instead, which may retain some characteristics of the previous ecosystem, yet has a greatly altered structure and function. There are exceptions where an ecosystem can be recovered past the point of a collapse, but by definition, will always be far more difficult to reverse than allowing a disturbed yet functioning ecosystem to recover, requiring active intervention and/or a prolonged period of time even if it can be reversed.

== Drivers ==
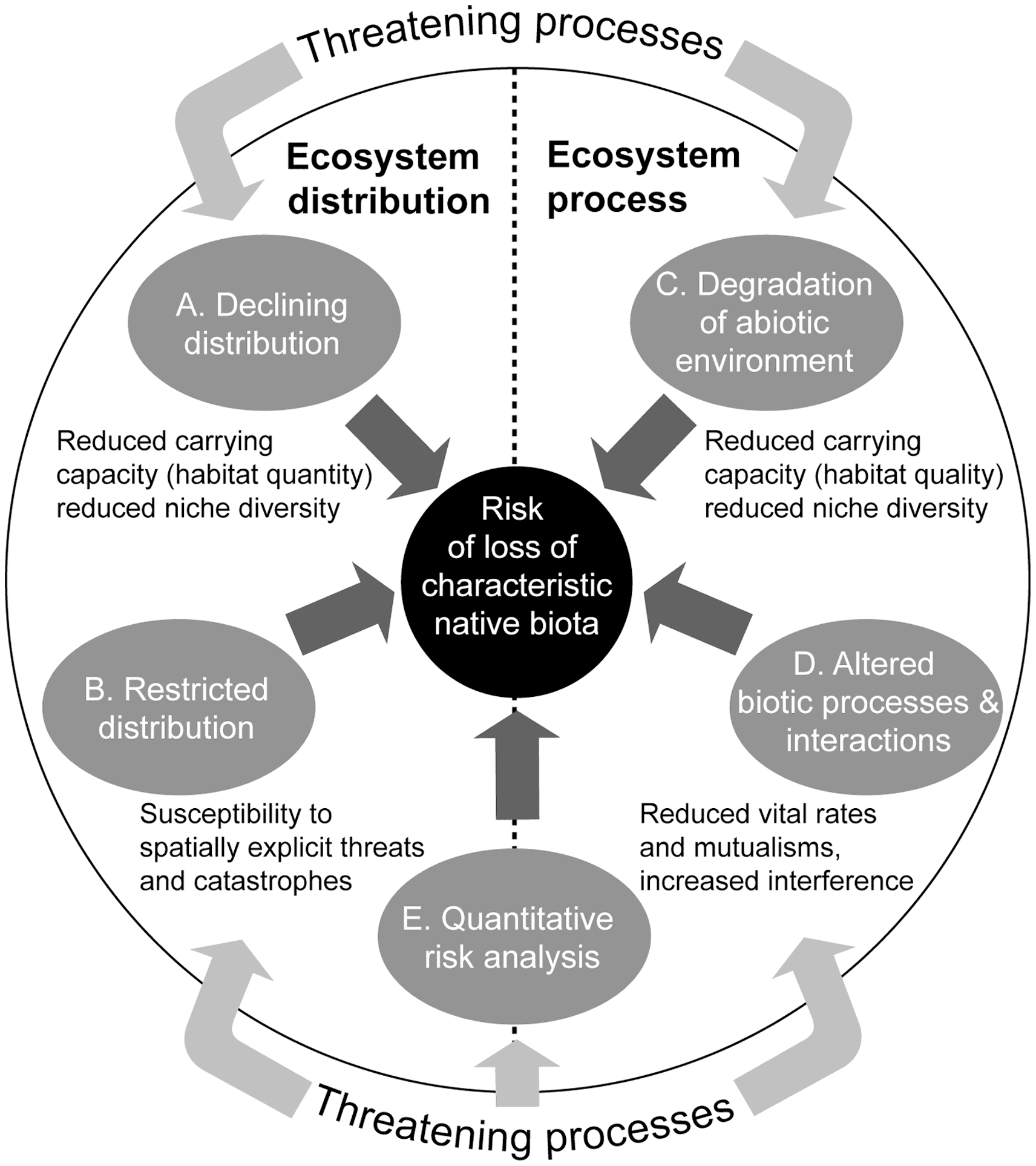
A diagram of the typical drivers of ecosystem collapse.

While collapse events can occur naturally with disturbances to an ecosystem—through fires, landslides, flooding, severe weather events, disease, or species invasion—there has been a noticeable increase in human-caused disturbances over the past fifty years. The combination of environmental change and the presence of human activity is increasingly detrimental to ecosystems of all types, as our unrestricted actions often increase the risk of abrupt (and potentially irreversible) changes post-disturbance; when a system would otherwise have been able to recover.

Some behaviors that induce transformation are: human intervention in the balance of local diversity (through introduction of new species or overexploitation), alterations in the chemical balance of environments through pollution, modifications of local climate or weather with anthropogenic climate change, and habitat destruction or fragmentation in terrestrial/marine systems. For instance, overgrazing was found to cause land degradation, specifically in Southern Europe, which is another driver of ecological collapse and natural landscape loss. Proper management of pastoral landscapes can mitigate risk of desertification.

Despite the strong empirical evidence and highly visible collapse-inducing disturbances, anticipating collapse is a complex problem. The collapse can happen when the ecosystem's distribution decreases below a minimal sustainable size, or when key biotic processes and features disappear due to environmental degradation or disruption of biotic interactions. These different pathways to collapse can be used as criteria for estimating the risk of ecosystem collapse. Although states of ecosystem collapse are often defined quantitatively, few studies adequately describe transitions from pristine or original state towards collapse.

== Geological record ==
In another example, 2004 research demonstrated how during the Last Glacial Maximum (LGM), alternations in the environment and climate led to a collapse of Lake Baikal and Lake Hovsgol ecosystems, which then drove species evolution. The collapse of Hovsgol's ecosystem during the LGM brought forth a new ecosystem, with limited biodiversity in species and low levels of endemism during the Holocene. That research also shows how ecosystem collapse during LGM in Lake Hovsgol led to higher levels of diversity and higher levels of endemism as a byproduct of subsequent evolution.

In the Carboniferous period, coal forests, great tropical wetlands, extended over much of Euramerica (Europe and America). This land supported towering lycopsids which fragmented and collapsed abruptly. The collapse of the rainforests during the Carboniferous has been attributed to multiple causes, including climate change and volcanism. Specifically, at this time climate became cooler and drier, conditions that are not favourable to the growth of rainforests and much of the biodiversity within them. The sudden collapse in the terrestrial environment made many large vascular plants, giant arthropods, and diverse amphibians to go extinct, allowing seed-bearing plants and amniotes to take over (but smaller relatives of the affected ones survived also).

== Historic examples ==
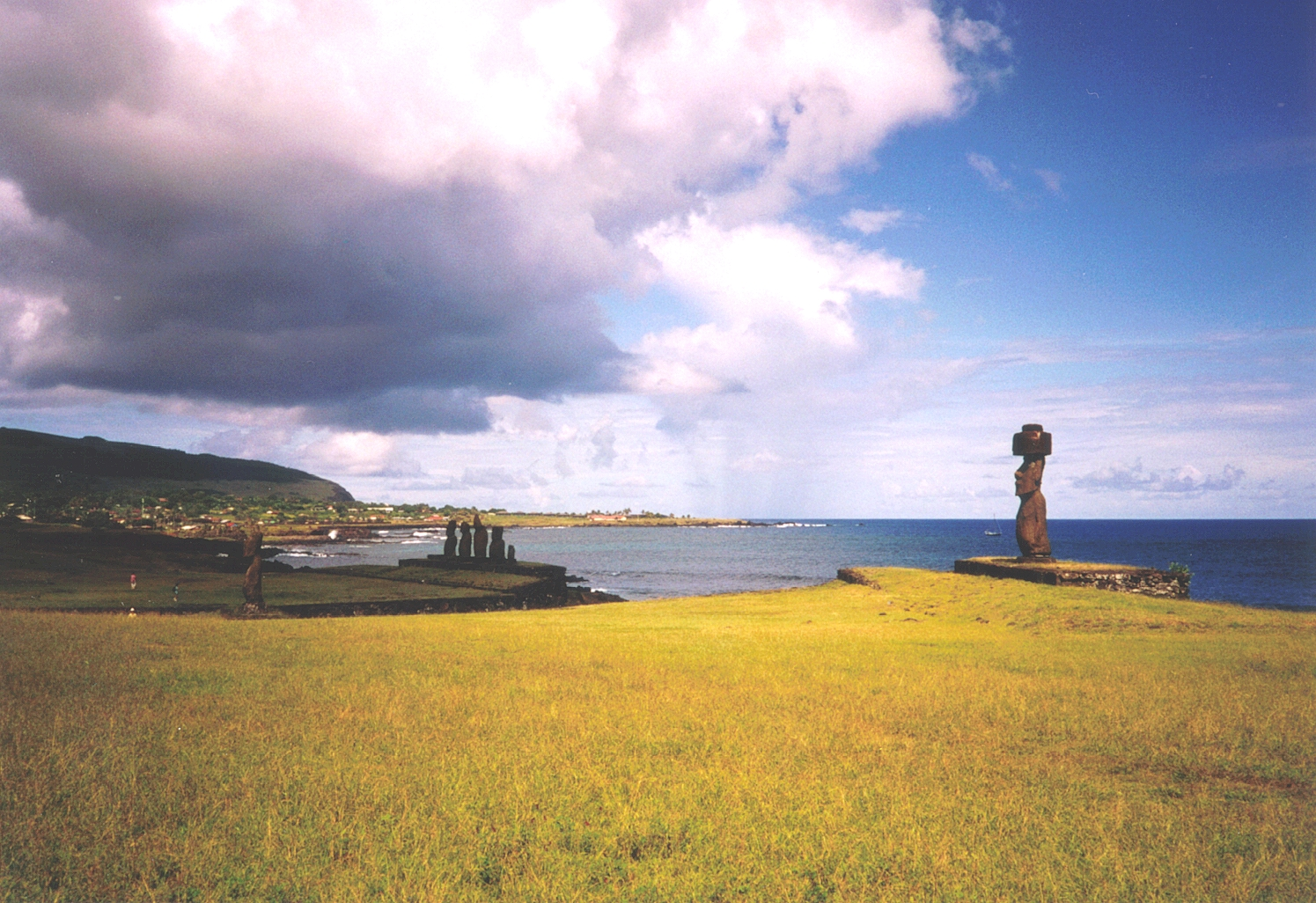
Subtropical broadleaf forests disappeared from Easter Island. The island is currently mostly covered in grassland with nga'atu or bulrush (Schoenoplectus californicus tatora) in the crater lakes of Rano Raraku and Rano Kau.

The Rapa Nui subtropical broadleaf forests in Easter Island, formerly dominated by an endemic palm, are considered collapsed due to the combined effects of overexploitation, climate change and introduced exotic rats.

The Aral Sea is an endorheic lake between Kazakhstan and Uzbekistan. It was once considered one of the largest lakes in the world but has been shrinking since the 1960s after the rivers that fed it were diverted for large scale irrigation. By 1997, it had declined to 10% of its original size, splitting into much smaller hypersaline lakes, while dried areas have transformed into desert steppes.

The regime shift in the northern Benguela upwelling ecosystem is considered an example of ecosystem collapse in open marine environments. Prior to the 1970s sardines were the dominant vertebrate consumers, but overfishing and two adverse climatic events (Benguela Niño in 1974 and 1984) lead to an impoverished ecosystem state with high biomass of jellyfish and pelagic goby.

Another notable example is the collapse of the Grand Banks cod in the early 1990s, when overfishing reduced fish populations to 1% of their historical levels.

== Currently collapsing ==
Some environments are not currently considered collapsed, but they are well on the way to collapse without intervention.

The Kimberley in Western Australia and the Cape York Peninsula, both in Australia's northern savannas, are considered some of the largest intact ecosystems, with the Kimberley containing 2,000 native plants and the Cape York Peninsula containing roughly 3,000. Both are home to hundreds of birds, mammals, reptiles, and insects. Because of fire-promoting weeds, the landscape has changed from woodlands to grasslands over the years. Additional pressures from climate change, overgrazing, and forestry have begun to cause a significant decline.

The mangroves of northern Australia continue to lose nutrients and landmass. Approximately 7,400 hectares (18,286 acres) of mangroves were lost in the largest recorded dieback event between 2015 and 2016.

The Great Barrier Reef recorded its first bleaching event in 1998, and the largest spread of bleaching occurred in 2020. Roughly 50% of the coral had been lost as of 2023. As the coral bleaches, it dies, and the organisms that rely on it for survival are also affected. The Great Barrier Reef is estimated to support over 9,000 different organisms. The continued decline of the Great Barrier Reef is caused by many factors, the largest being climate change and pollution.

According to the Climate Change Vulnerability Index, Shark Bay is considered the most vulnerable ecosystem. The ecosystem supports the local community, but declines caused by global warming and climate change have heavily affected it. Seagrass, the main source of habitat for fish and marine life, is not sustainable under changing climate conditions.

The Great Salt Lake in Utah is considered a keystone ecosystem and a key economic factor for the state. It has lost over 73% of its water and 60% of its surface area since 1850. Unless drastic measures are taken, the lake is expected to dry up completely, causing irreparable damage that will harm wildlife and public health while leading to environmental and economic decline.

== Contemporary risk ==
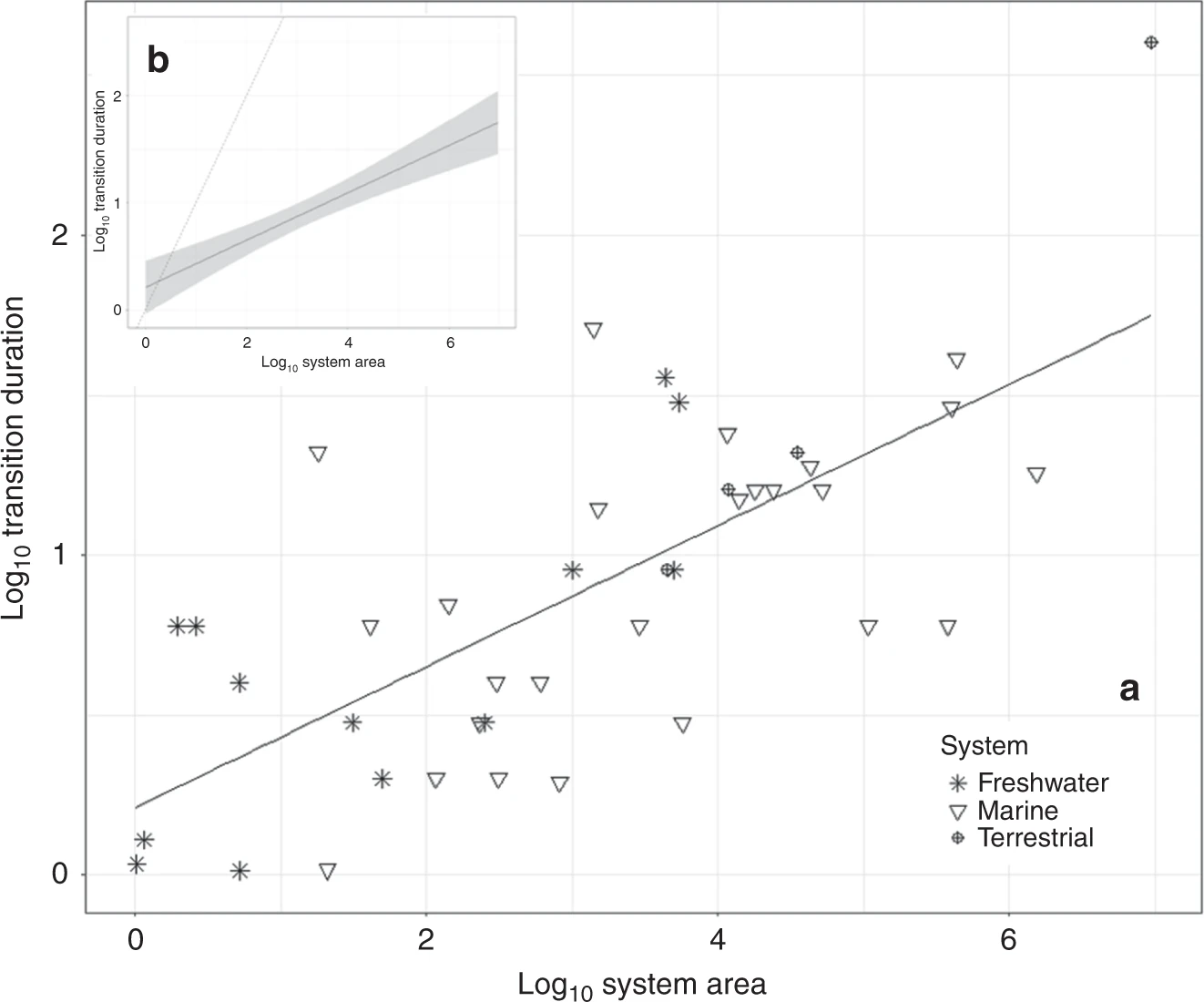
Log–log linear relationship between the spatial area and the temporal duration of 42 observed Earth system regime shifts

There are two tools commonly used together to assess risks to ecosystems and biodiversity: generic risk assessment protocols and stochastic simulation models. The most notable of the two tactics is risk assessment protocol, particularly because of the IUCN Red List of Ecosystems (RLE), which is widely applicable to many ecosystems even in data-poor circumstances. However, because using this tool is essentially comparing systems to a list of criteria, it is often limited in its ability to look at ecosystem decline holistically; and is thus often used in conjunction with simulation models that consider more aspects of decline such as ecosystem dynamics, future threats, and social-ecological relationships.

The IUCN RLE is a global standard that was developed to assess threats to various ecosystems on local, regional, national, and global scales, as well as to prompt conservation efforts in the face of the unparalleled decline of natural systems in the last decade. And though this effort is still in the earlier stages of implementation, the IUCN has a goal to assess the risk of collapse for all of the world's ecosystems by 2025. The concept of ecosystem collapse is used in the framework to establish categories of risk for ecosystems, with the category Collapsed used as the end-point of risk assessment. Other categories of threat (Vulnerable, Endangered and Critically Endangered) are defined in terms of the probability or risk of collapse. A paper by Bland et al. suggests four aspects for defining ecosystem collapse in risk assessments:

1. qualitatively defining initial and collapsed states
2. describing collapse and recovery transitions
3. identifying and selecting indicators of collapse
4. setting quantitative collapse thresholds.

=== Early detection and monitoring ===
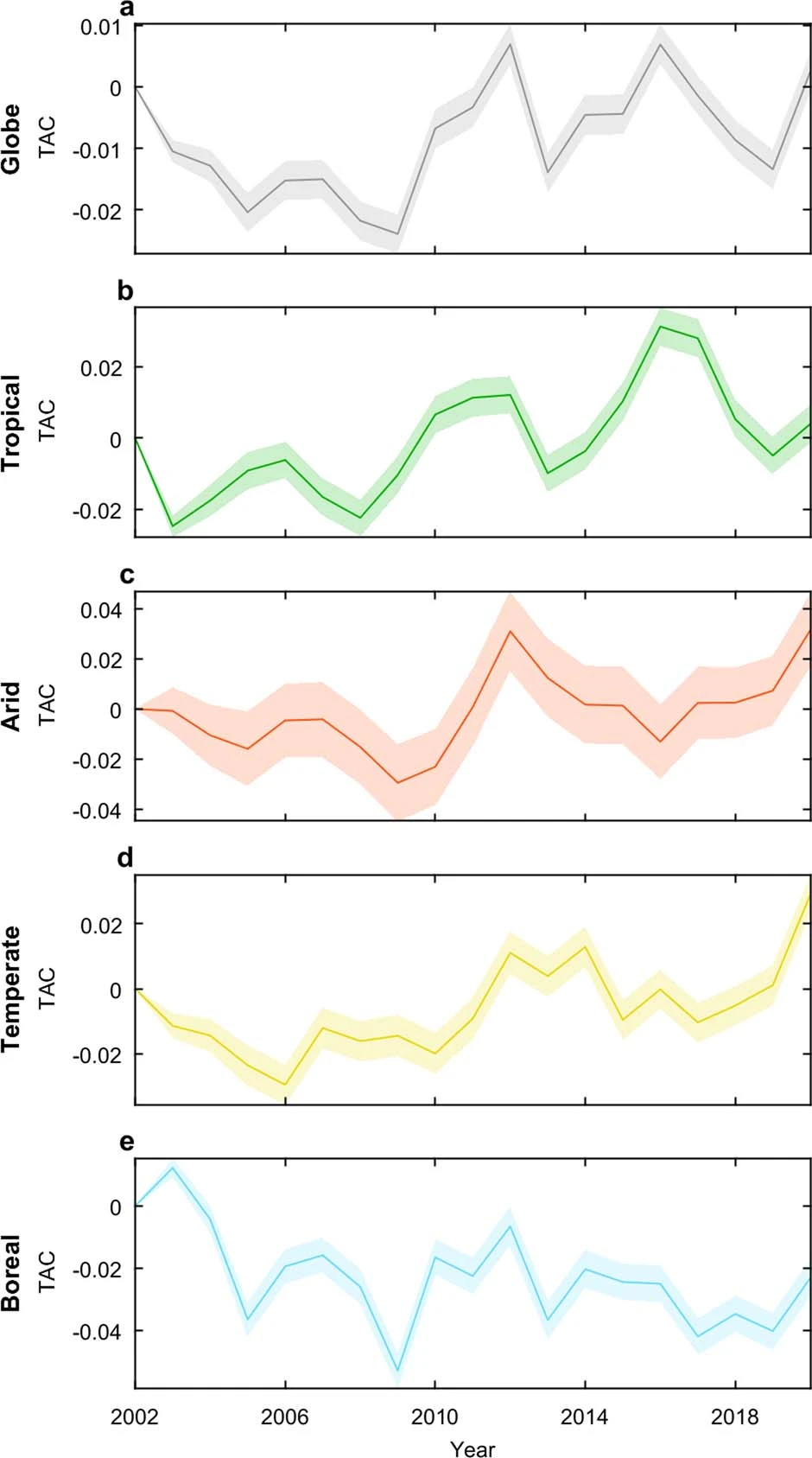
Emerging signals of declining forest resilience under climate change.

Scientists can predict tipping points for ecosystem collapse. The most frequently used model for predicting food web collapse is called R50, which is a reliable measurement model for food web robustness. However, there are others: i.e. marine ecosystem assessments can use RAM Legacy Stock Assessment Database. In one example, 154 different marine fish species were studied to establish the relationship between pressures on fish populations such as overfishing and climate change, these populations; traits like growth rate, and the risk of ecosystem collapse.

The measurement of "critical slowing down" (CSD) is one approach for developing early warning signals for a potential or likely onset of approaching collapse. It refers to increasingly slow recovery from perturbations.

In 2020, one paper suggested that once a 'point of no return' is reached, breakdowns do not occur gradually but rapidly and that the Amazon rainforest could shift to a savannah-type mixture of trees and grass within 50 years and the Caribbean coral reefs could collapse within 15 years once a state of collapse has been reached. Another indicated that large ecosystem disruptions will occur earlier under more intense climate change: under the high-emissions RCP8.5 scenario, ecosystems in the tropical oceans would be the first to experience abrupt disruption before 2030, with tropical forests and polar environments following by 2050. In total, 15% of ecological assemblages would have over 20% of their species abruptly disrupted if as warming eventually reaches 4 °C (7.2 °F); in contrast, this would happen to fewer than 2% if the warming were to stay below 2 °C (3.6 °F).

=== Rainforest collapse ===
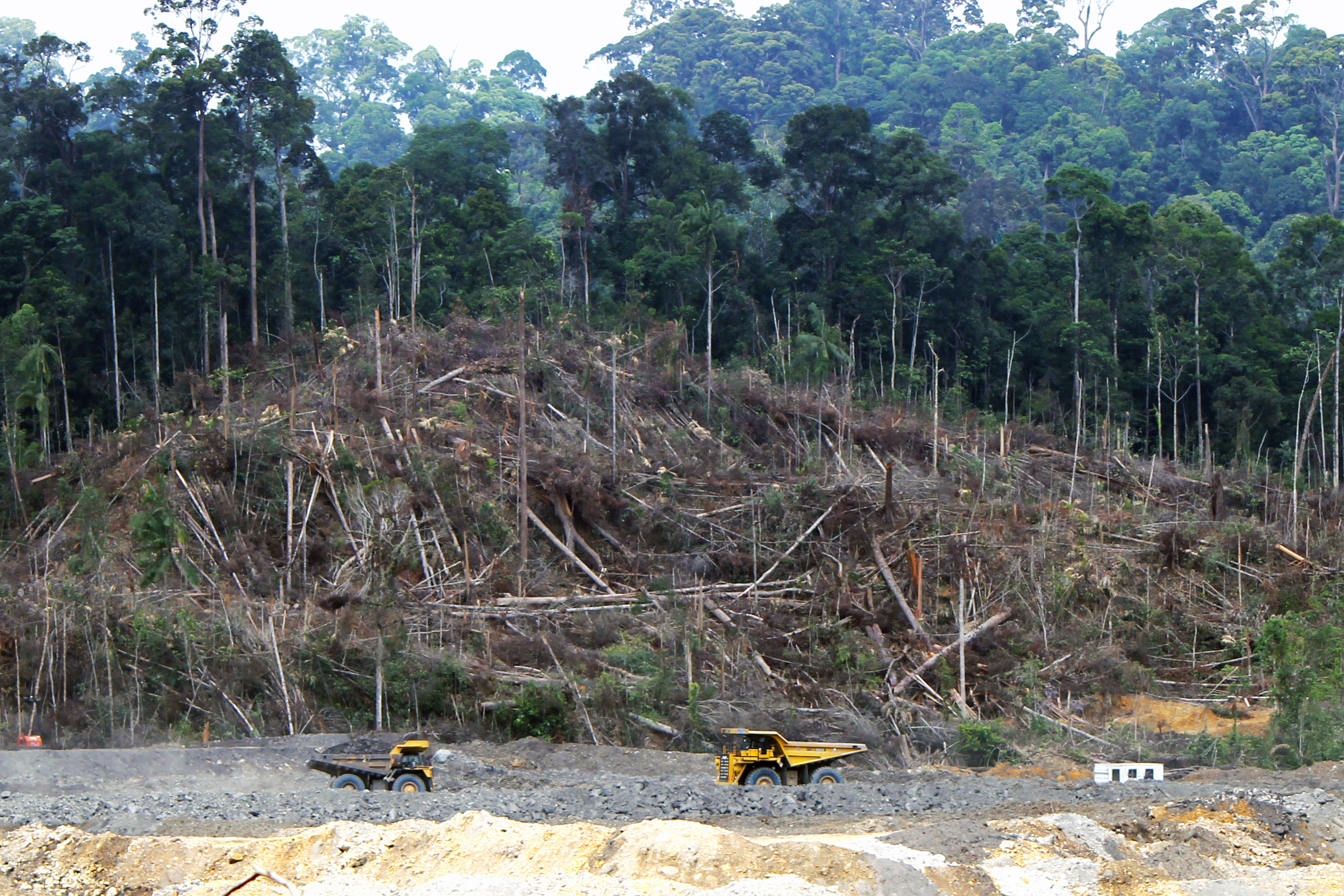
Trees being felled in Kalimantan, the Indonesian part of Borneo, in 2013, to make way for a new coal mining project

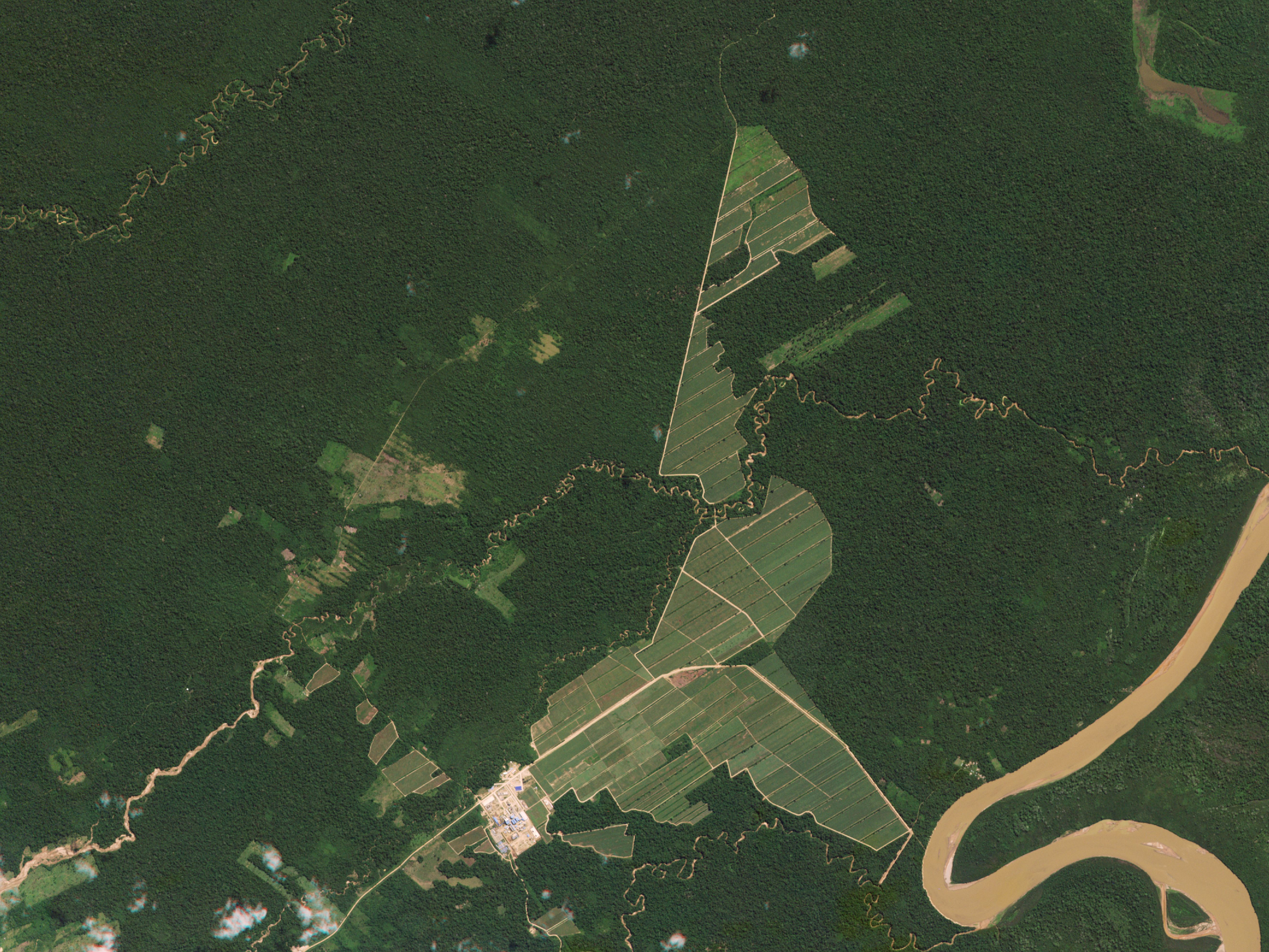
Deforestation of the Amazon rainforest in Bolivia in 2016

Rainforest collapse refers to the actual past and theoretical future ecological collapse of rainforests. It may involve habitat fragmentation to the point where little rainforest biome is left, and rainforest species only survive in isolated refugia. Habitat fragmentation can be caused by roads. When humans start to cut down the trees for logging, secondary roads are created that will go unused after its primary use. Once abandoned, the plants of the rainforest will find it difficult to grow back in that area. Forest fragmentation also opens the path for illegal hunting. Species have a hard time finding a new place to settle in these fragments causing ecological collapse. This leads to extinction of many animals in the rainforest.

A classic pattern of forest fragmentation is occurring in many rainforests including those of the Amazon, specifically a 'fishbone' pattern formed by the development of roads into the forest. This is of great concern, not only because of the loss of a biome with many untapped resources and wholesale death of living organisms, but also because plant and animal species extinction is known to correlate with habitat fragmentation.

In 2022, research found that more than three-quarters of the Amazon rainforest has been losing resilience due to deforestation and climate change since the early 2000s as measured by recovery-time from short-term perturbations (the critical slowing down), reinforcing the theory that it is approaching a critical transition. Another study from 2022 found that tropical, arid and temperate forests are substantially losing resilience.

=== Coral reefs ===
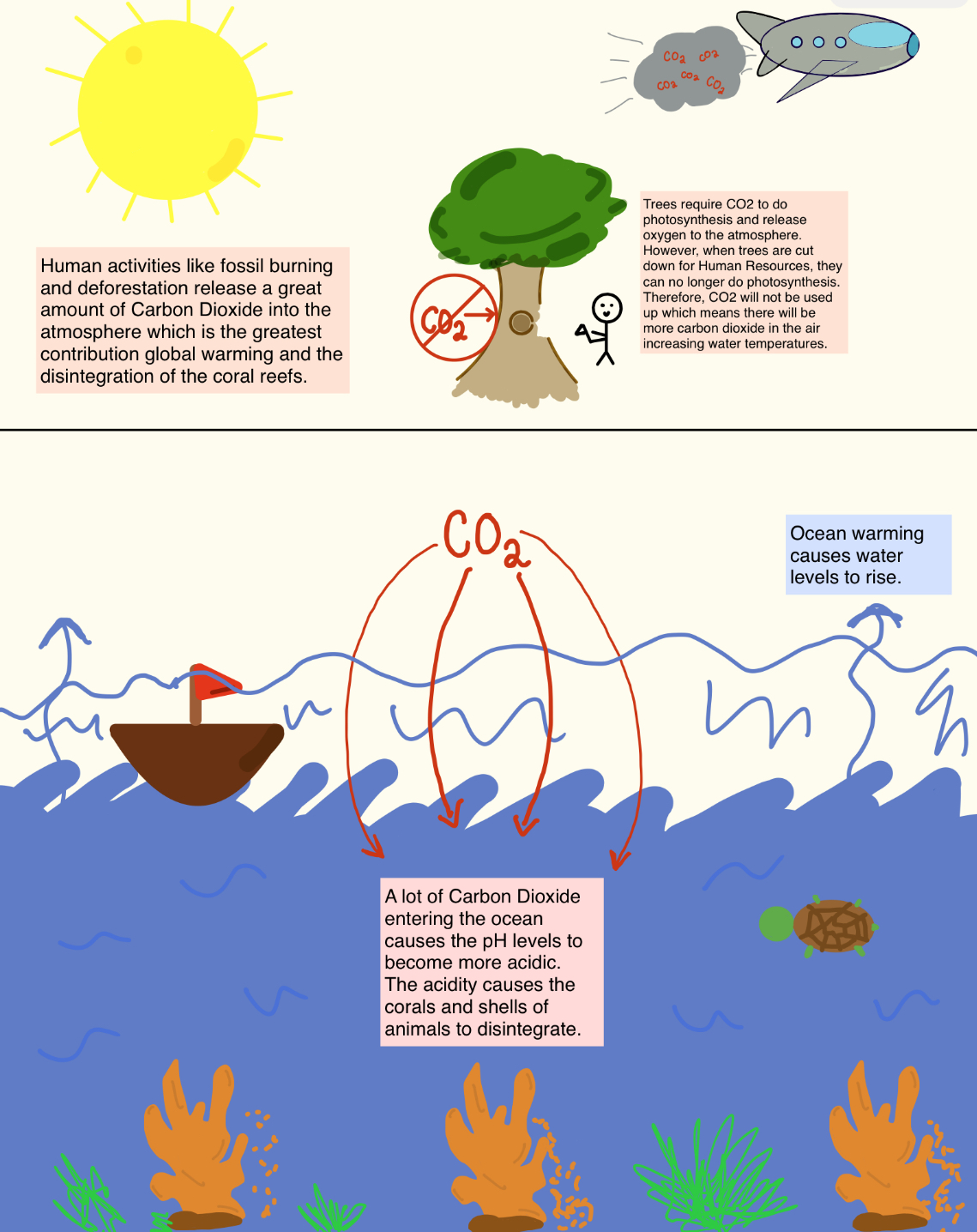
Human activities release large amounts of carbon dioxide, which then lead to ocean warming, harming marine life and coral reefs.

A major concern for marine biologists is the collapse of coral reef ecosystems. An effect of global climate change is the rising sea levels which can lead to reef drowning or coral bleaching. Human activity, such as fishing, mining, deforestation, ..., serves as a threat for coral reefs by affecting the niche of the coral reefs. For example, there is a demonstrated correlation between a loss in diversity of coral reefs by 30-60% and human activity such as sewage and/or industrial pollution.

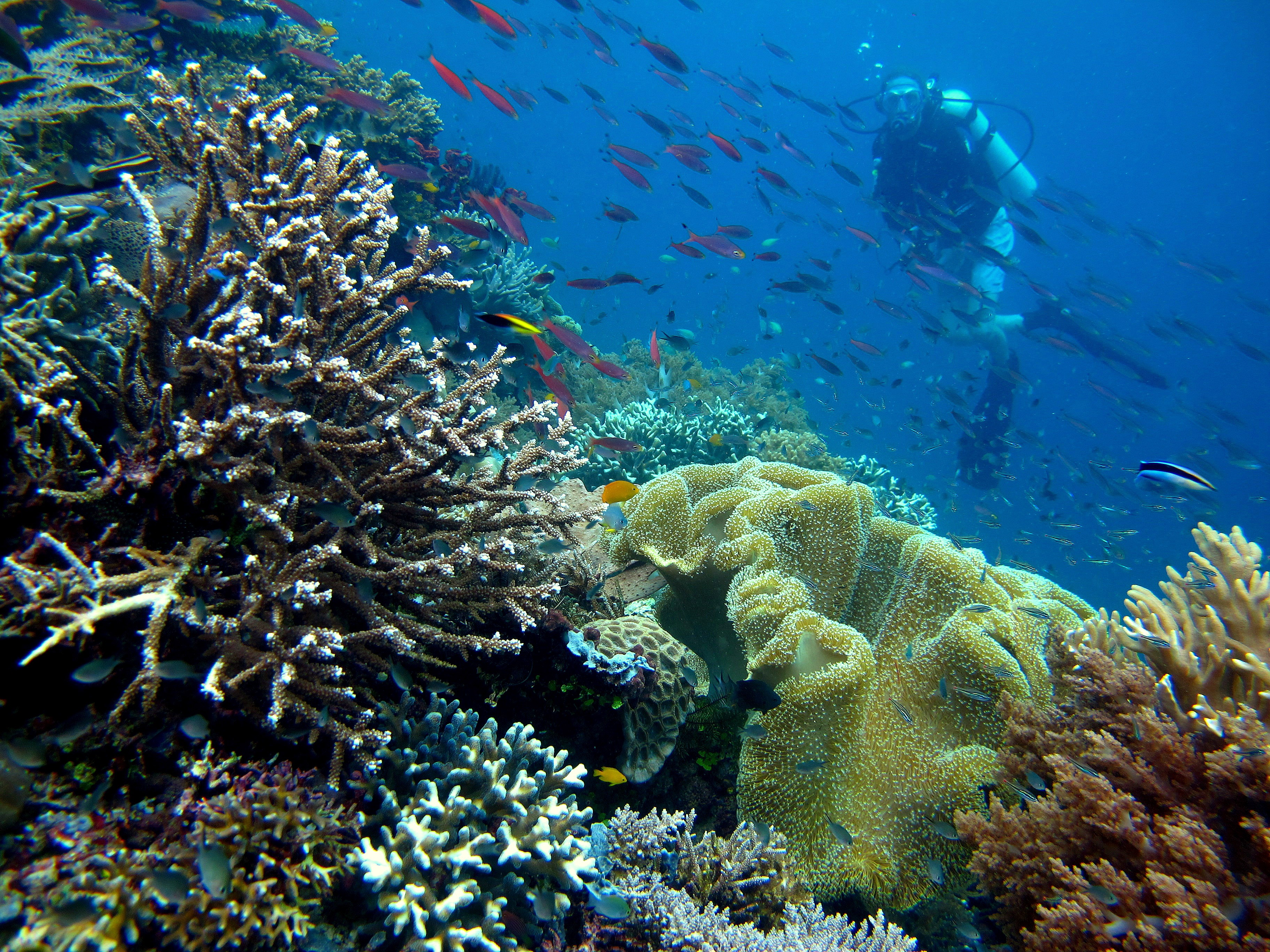
Coral reefs off Raja Ampat Islands in New Guinea

Almost no other ecosystem is as vulnerable to climate change as coral reefs. Updated 2022 estimates show that even at a global average increase of 1.5 °C (2.7 °F) over pre-industrial temperatures, only 0.2% of the world's coral reefs would still be able to withstand marine heatwaves, as opposed to 84% being able to do so now, with the figure dropping to 0% by 2 °C (3.6 °F) and beyond. However, it was found in 2021 that each square meter of coral reef area contains about 30 individual corals, and their total number is estimated at half a trillion - equivalent to all the trees in the Amazon, or all the birds in the world. As such, most individual coral reef species are predicted to avoid extinction even as coral reefs would cease to function as the ecosystems we know. A 2013 study found that 47–73 coral species (6–9%) are vulnerable to climate change while already threatened with extinction according to the IUCN Red List, and 74–174 (9–22%) coral species were not vulnerable to extinction at the time of publication, but could be threatened under continued climate change, making them a future conservation priority. The authors of the recent coral number estimates suggest that those older projections were too high, although this has been disputed.

== Conservation and reversal ==
As of now, there is not much information on effective conservation or reversal methods for ecosystem collapse. Rather, there has been increased focus on the predictability of ecosystem collapse, whether it is possible, and whether it is productive to explore. This is likely because thorough studies of at-risk ecosystems are a more recent development and trend in ecological fields, so collapse dynamics are either too recent to observe or still emerging. Since studies are not yet long term, conclusions about reversibility or transformation potential are often hard to draw from newer, more focused studies.

== See also ==
- Arctic shrinkage
- Ecological resilience
- Ecosystem services
- Environmental degradation
- Overshoot (ecology)
- Tipping points in the climate system
