= David Mark Richardson =

South African ecologist (born 1958)

- Born: 16 June 1958 (age 68); Pretoria, South Africa
- Education: Stellenbosch University
- Occupation: Ecologist

David Mark Richardson (born 16 June 1958) is a South African ecologist, particularly known for his work on invasive species, especially invasive trees and shrubs.

== Biography ==
Richardson was born in Pretoria. He received his BSc degree in Forestry from Stellenbosch University in 1981 and his PhD in Botany from the University of Cape Town in 1989. He worked as Associate Professor of Botany and deputy director of the Institute for Plant Conservation at the University of Cape Town from 1992 to 2004. He joined the Department of Botany and Zoology at Stellenbosch University as Professor of Ecology and served as Deputy-Director (Science Strategy) at the Centre for Invasion Biology between 2004 and 2012. In 2012 he was appointed Director of the Centre for Invasion Biology, and in 2014 he was promoted to Distinguished Professor.

He was Editor-in-Chief of the journal Diversity and Distributions between 1998 and 2015.

== Awards and honours ==
- In 2006, Richardson was awarded the Hans Sigrist Prize from the Hans Sigrist Stiftung, Switzerland
- In 2007 and 2013 he received A1 ratings from South Africa's National Research Foundation of South Africa
- In 2008 he was elected a Fellow of the Royal Society of South Africa.
- In 2009 he won the National Science and Technology Forum Award (Category B; Individual, through research and its outputs over the last five years)
- In 2009 he was elected a Member of the Academy of Science of South Africa
- In 2012 he received the John F.W. Herschel Medal from the Royal Society of South Africa for his "multidisciplinary contribution to science in South Africa through your exceptional work on the ecology of biological invasions and management strategies for introduced species".
- In 2018 he received the African Union Kwame Nkrumah Award for Scientific Excellence in the Life and Earth Sciences category.

== Selected publications ==
- Richardson, D.M. & Bond, W.J. (1991). Determinants of plant distribution: Evidence from pine invasions. American Naturalist, 137: 639–668.

- Rejmánek, M. & Richardson, D.M. (1996). What attributes make some plant species more invasive? Ecology, 77: 1655–1661.

- Cowling, R.M., Richardson, D.M. & Pierce, S.M. (eds) (1997). Vegetation of southern Africa. Cambridge University Press, Cambridge. ISBN 978-0-521-54801-4.

- Richardson, D.M. (ed)(1998). Ecology and Biogeography of Pinus. Cambridge University Press, Cambridge. ISBN 978-0-521-78910-3.

- Richardson, D.M. (1998). Forestry trees as invasive aliens. Conservation Biology, 12: 18–26.

- Higgins, S.I. & Richardson, D.M. (1999). Predicting plant migration rates in a changing world: the role of long-distance dispersal. American Naturalist, 153: 464–475.

- Richardson, D.M., Allsopp, N., D'Antonio, C.M., Milton, S.J. & Rejmánek, M. (2000). Plant invasions: The role of mutualisms. Biological Reviews, 75: 65–93.

- Richardson, D.M., Pyšek, P., Rejmánek, M., Barbour, M.G., Panetta, D.F. & West, C.J. (2000). Naturalization and invasion of alien plants – concepts and definitions. Diversity and Distributions, 6: 93–107.

- Richardson, D.M. & Rejmánek, M. (2004). Invasive conifers: A global survey and predictive framework. Diversity and Distributions, 10: 321–331.

- Richardson, D.M. & Pyšek, P. (2006). Plant invasions – merging the concepts of species invasiveness and community invasibility. Progress in Physical Geography, 30: 409–431.

- Richardson, D.M. & Rundel, P.W., Jackson, S.T., Teskey, R.O., Aronson, J., Bytnerowicz, A., Wingfield, M.J. & Procheş, S. (2007). Human impacts in pine forests: past, present and future. Annual Review of Ecology, Evolution, and Systematics, 38: 275–297.

- Richardson, D.M., Hellmann, J.J., McLachlan, et al.(2009). Multidimensional evaluation of managed relocation. Proceedings of the National Academy of Sciences of the United States of America, 106: 9721–9724.

- Richardson, D.M. (ed.)(2011). Fifty years of invasion ecology. The legacy of Charles Elton. Wiley-Blackwell, Oxford. ISBN 978-1-4443-3585-9.

- Richardson, D.M., Carruthers, J., Hui, C., Impson, F.A.C., Robertson, M.P., Rouget, M., Le Roux, J.J., Wilson, J.R.U. (2011). Human-mediated introductions of Australian acacias—a global experiment in biogeography. Diversity and Distributions, 17: 771–787

- Hui, C. & Richardson, D.M.(2017). Invasion Dynamics. Oxford University Press, Oxford. ISBN 9780198745334.
