= Melodie McGeoch =

- Born: Gauteng, South Africa
- Education: University of KwaZulu-Natal (B.Sc), University of Pretoria (PhD)
- Occupations: Ecologist and Biodiversity scientist
- Employer(s): Monash University, La Trobe University
- Known for: Biodiversity studies and assessment
- Awards: Fellow, African Academy of Sciences
- Website: melodiemcgeoch.com

Melodie McGeoch is a South African-Australian ecologist and biodiversity scientist, whose research focuses on the measurement and monitoring of biodiversity, spatial ecology, biological invasions, climate change impacts and the development of biodiversity indicators used in policy and conservation. She is a professor of ecology at Monash University in Australia, and is a fellow of the African Academy of Sciences.

== Education ==
McGeoch was born in Gauteng, South Africa. She completed her B.Sc in botany and entomology at the University of KwaZulu-Natal, and was awarded a PhD in 1995 from the University of Pretoria for research on community ecology that examined interactions among Acacia, fungi and insects.

== Career ==
After completion of her PhD, McGeoch carried out a postdoctoral fellowship at the University of Sheffield in the UK. She subsequently held academic appointments at the University of Pretoria and Stellenbosch University in South Africa and served as Head of the Cape Research Centre, South African National Parks.

In 2012, she moved to Australia to join Monash University, where she became Professor in the School of Biological Sciences, and later served as Academic Director, Research Performance in the Office of the Deputy Vice-Chancellor & Senior Vice-President (Enterprise & Governance). She is Chief Investigator and Theme Lead within the Australian Research Council initiative Securing Antarctica’s Environmental Future, and holds a professional adjunct appointment at La Trobe University.

McGeoch is Co-Chair of the Species Populations Working Group of the Group on Earth Observations Biodiversity Observation Network (GEO BON), Coordinating Lead Author for the IPBES assessment on invasive alien species (2019-2023), and First Vice Chair of the Science Committee of the Governing Board of the Global Biodiversity Information Facility (GBIF) for the term 2021-2026.

McGeoch has played the leading role in the development of biodiversity indicators, including work underpinning Essential Biodiversity Variables, and has contributed to the Global Register of Introduced and Invasive Species.

== Awards and recognition ==
In 2014, McGeoch received the Australian Ecology Research Award (AERA) for her contributions to biodiversity monitoring. She was elected as a fellow of the African Academy of Sciences in 2021.

== Selected publications ==
- McGeoch, Melodie A.; Chown, Steven L.; Kalwij, Jesse M. (2006). "A Global Indicator for Biological Invasion". Conservation Biology. 20 (6): 1635–1646. doi:10.1111/j.1523-1739.2006.00579.x. hdl:10019.1/117503. ISSN 0888-8892.
- McGeoch, Melodie A.; Butchart, Stuart H. M.; Spear, Dian; Marais, Elrike; Kleynhans, Elizabeth J.; Symes, Andy; Chanson, Janice; Hoffmann, Michael (2010). "Global indicators of biological invasion: species numbers, biodiversity impact and policy responses". Diversity and Distributions. 16 (1): 95–108. doi:10.1111/j.1472-4642.2009.00633.x. hdl:10019.1/117489. ISSN 1366-9516.
- McGeoch, Melodie A.; Latombe, Guillaume (2016). "Characterizing common and range expanding species". Journal of Biogeography. 43 (2): 217–228. doi:10.1111/jbi.12642. ISSN 0305-0270.
- McGeoch, Melodie A.; Buba, Yehezkel; Arlé, Eduardo; Belmaker, Jonathan; Clarke, David A.; Jetz, Walter; Li, Richard; Seebens, Hanno; Essl, Franz; Groom, Quentin; García‐Berthou, Emili; Lenzner, Bernd; Meyer, Carsten; Vicente, Joana R.; Wilson, John R. U.; Winter, Marten (2023). "Invasion trends: An interpretable measure of change is needed to support policy targets". Conservation Letters. 16 (6). doi:10.1111/conl.12981. ISSN 1755-263X.
