= IUCN Red List of Ecosystems =

International list of biodiversity conservation priorities

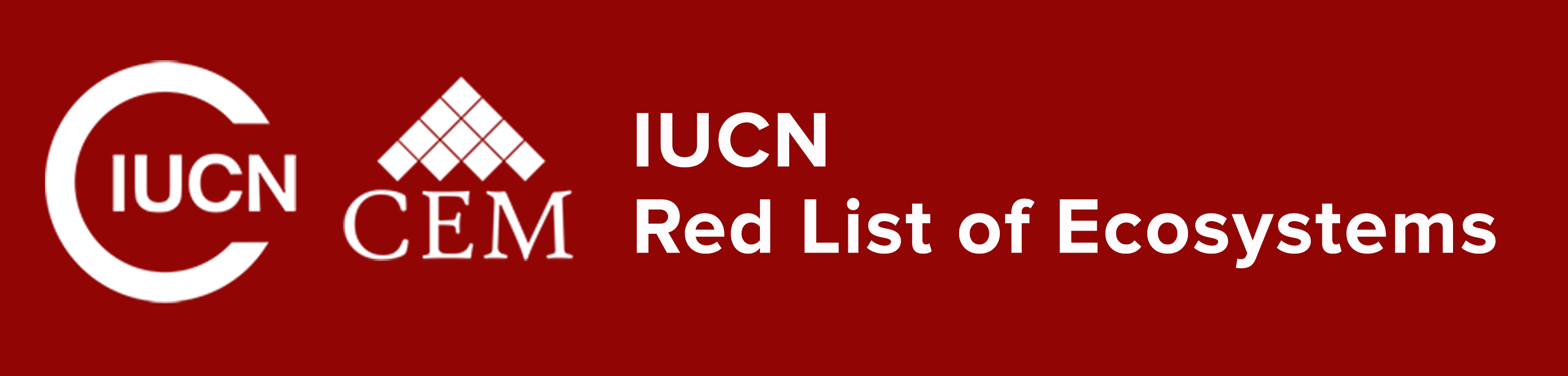
LRE - Knowledge product of IUCN/CEM

The IUCN Red List of Ecosystems (RLE) is a global framework for monitoring and documenting the status of ecosystems. It was developed by the International Union for Conservation of Nature for biodiversity risk assessment. Its main objectives are to support conservation, resource use, and management decisions by evaluating all the world's ecosystems by 2025.

The Red List of Ecosystem was developed by the International Union for Conservation of Nature (IUCN), the same entity that created the Red List of Threatened Species, a global framework to monitor the level of risk of animal and plant species.

With the help of RLE and its partner organizations, many governments and organizations create national and regional red lists, generally based on the IUCN categories and criteria, to classify the ecosystems under threat within their territorial limits.

== History ==
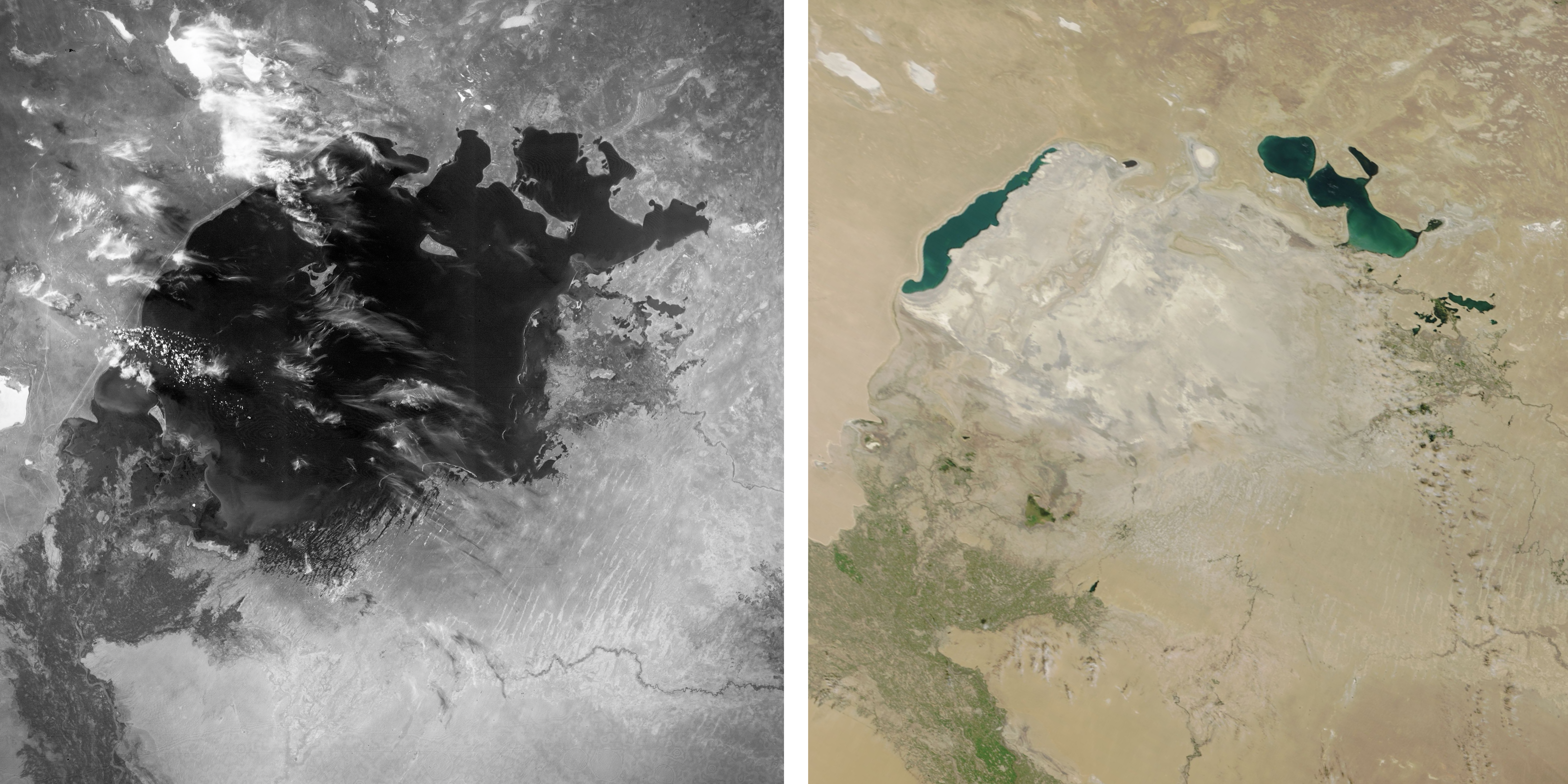
Image of the Aral Sea in August 22, 1964 (left) and August 25, 2026. The Aral Sea is an example of a Collapsed (CO) ecosystem. (image source: NASA)

The Red List of Ecosystems was created to carry out assessments of biodiversity at a level of biological organization above species. Existing protocols developed by national or subnational authorities differed in focus and implementation, were often not comparable, and did not distinguish between strict risk analysis and the process of setting conservation priorities.

In 2008, during the IV World Conservation Congress (Barcelona, Spain), the process of developing criteria to estimate their risk status was activated and the IUCN laid the foundations for the creation of a Red List of Ecosystems (RLE). The initial development of the criteria for the List was based on analogies with the criteria for species and on existing protocols designed for regional applications.

In 2013, the process of creating The Categories and Criteria of the IUCN Red List Ecosystems, was finalized. That same year, "Scientific Foundations of an IUCN Red List of Ecosystems" was published to provide a consistent, practical and theory-based framework for establishing a systematic list.

The RLE was officially recognized by IUCN in 2014, to be managed as a Thematic Group under the IUCN Commission on Ecosystem Management (CEM).

== The Red List of Ecosystems as a tool ==
Like other IUCN products, the LRE provides an opportunity to facilitate the achievement of international conservation objectives and allows to assess an ecosystem's danger of collapse either globally or by portions developed over a region, country, or subnational entity.

This provides a means to make more effective territorial arrangements, minimizing the impacts from the anthropic transformations of large surfaces. It contributes to better management of the limited resources devoted to conservation. It prioritizes ecosystems with the most imminent chances of disappearing, focussing on them the greatest efforts to mitigate environmental threats, and create effective protected areas to safeguard them.

== Categories and Criteria ==
The basis of the IUCN Red List of Ecosystems are the IUCN Red List of Ecosystems Categories and Criteria, a set of eight categories and five criteria that provide a consistent method for assessing an ecosystem's risk of collapse. They are designed to be: broadly applicable across type ecosystems and geographic areas, transparent and scientifically rigorous, and easy to understand by decision makers and the public. The eight categories and the five criteria of the Red List of Ecosystems are:

=== Risk Categories ===
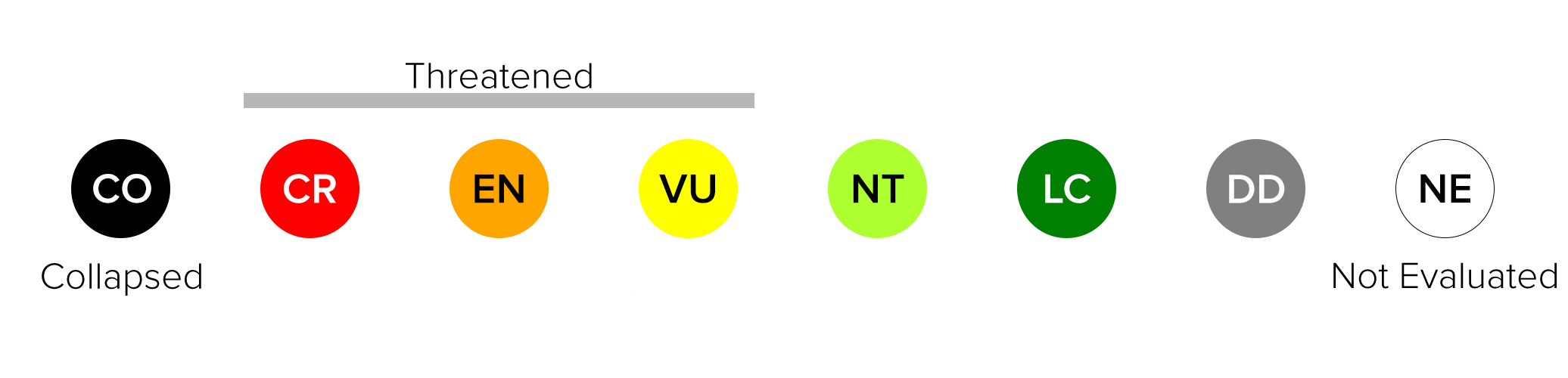
Schematic of categories to classify ecosystems according to the IUCN Red List of Ecosystems criteria

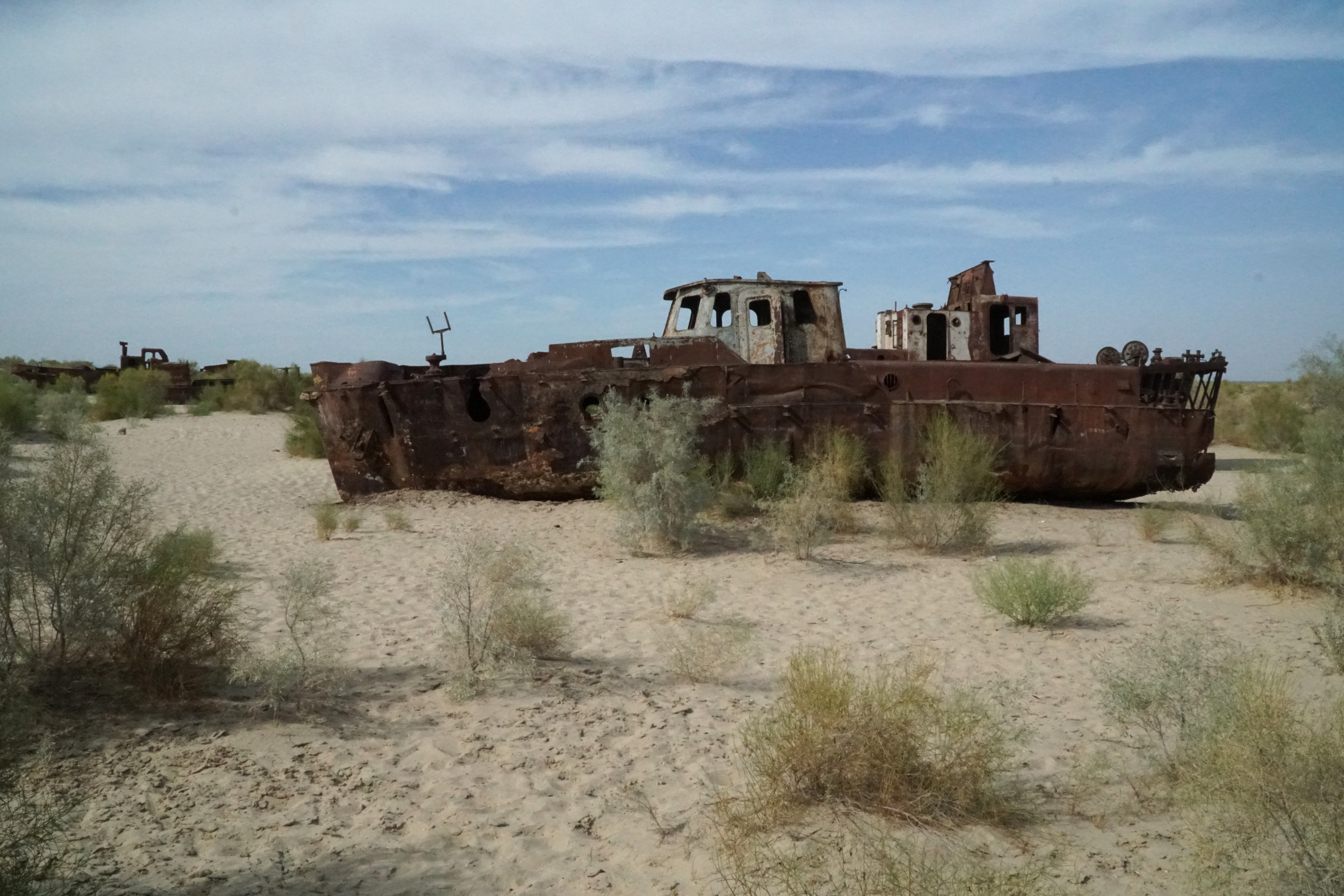
The Aral Sea is considered Collapsed (CO).

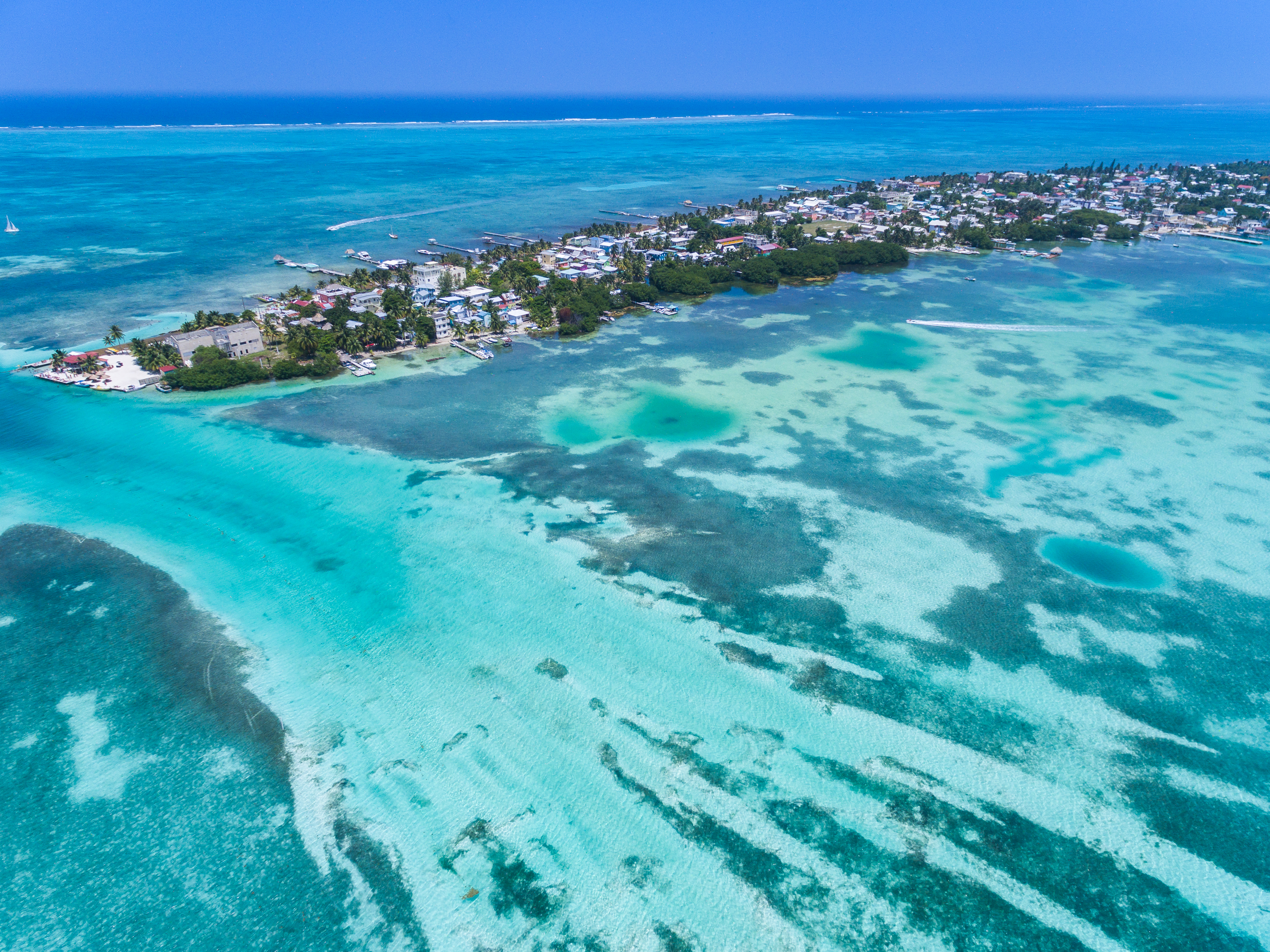
The Mesoamerican Barrier Reef System is considered Critically Endangered (CR).

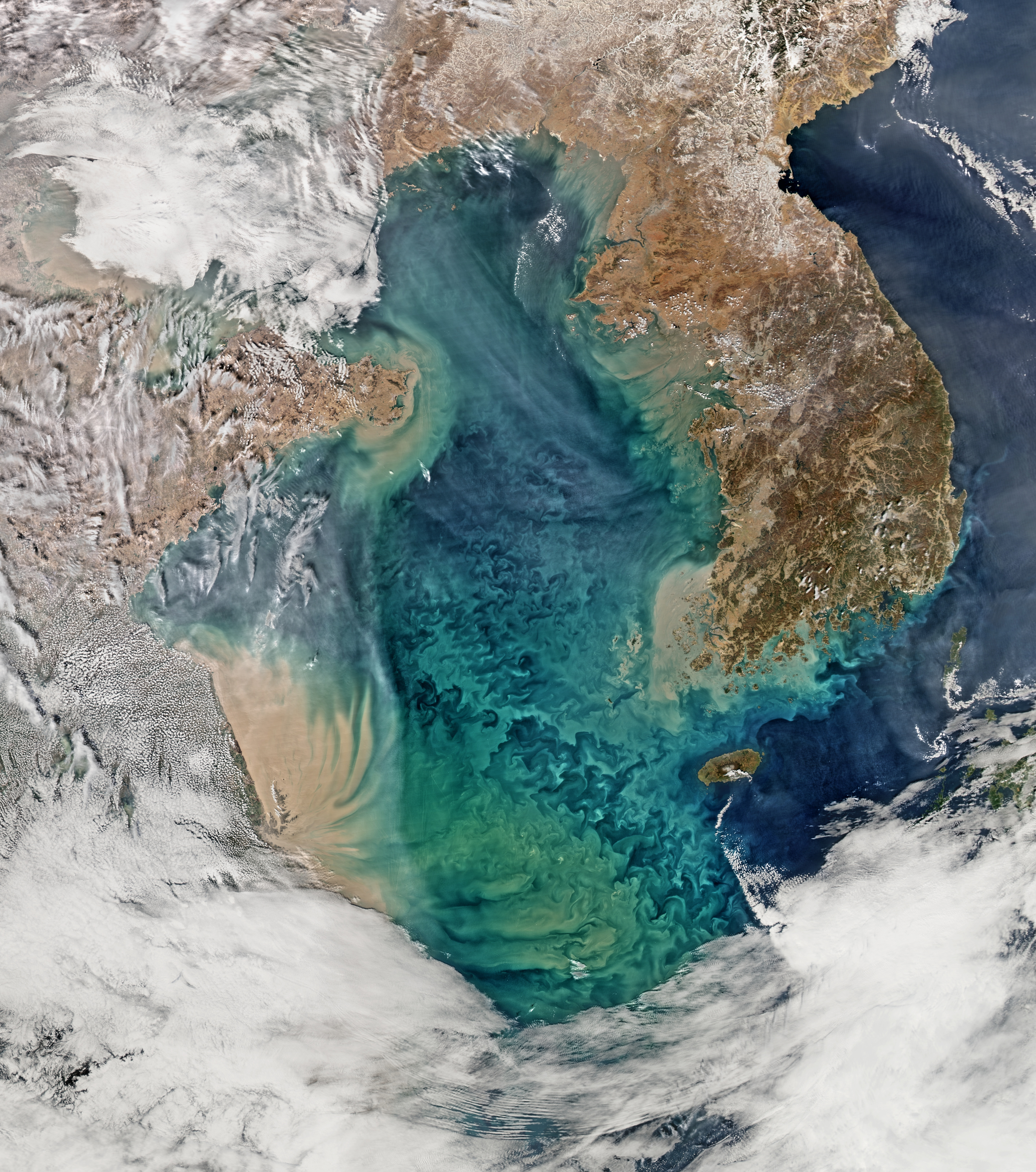
The tidal flats of the Yellow Sea are considered Endangered (EN).

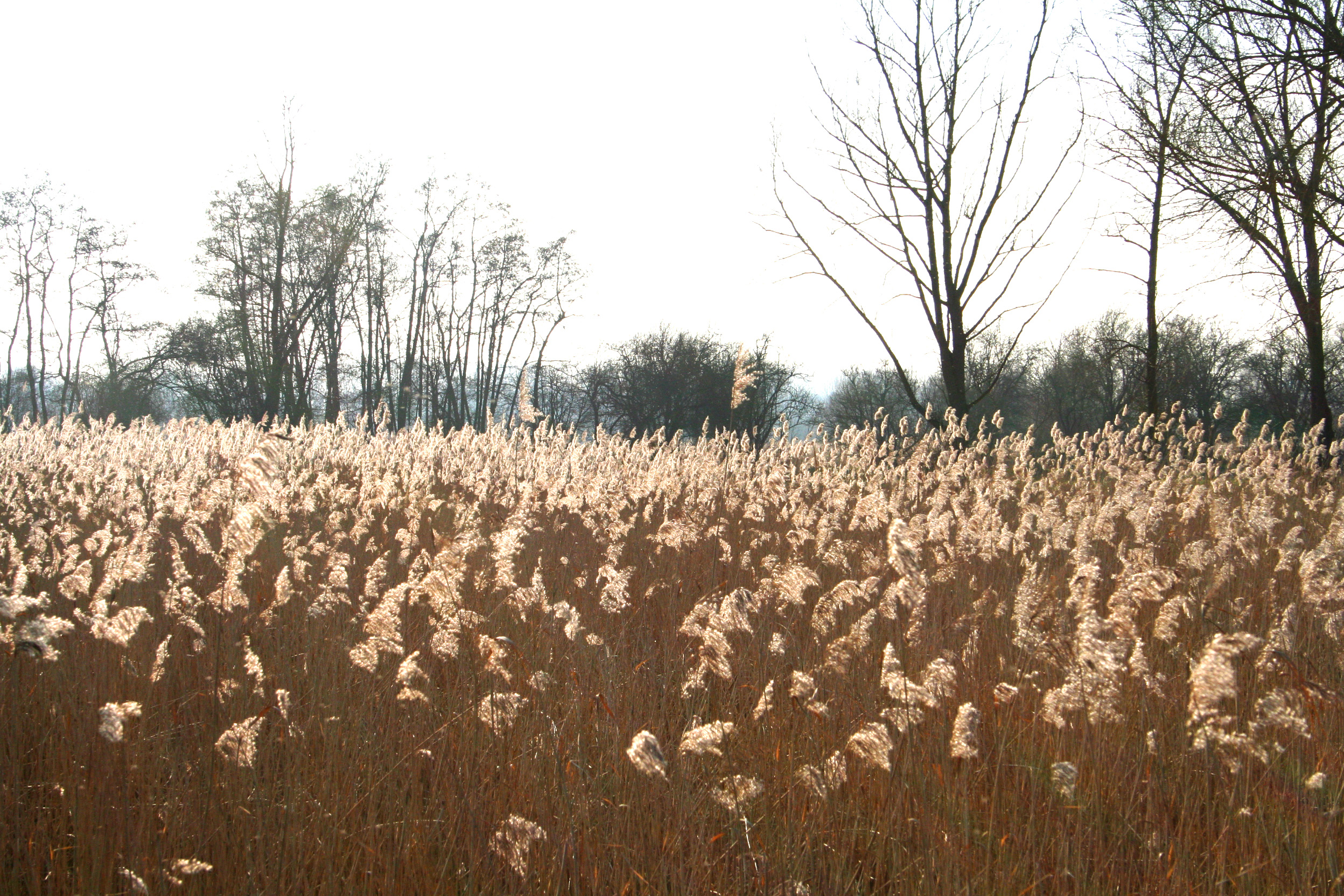
European Reed beds are considered Vulnerable (VU).

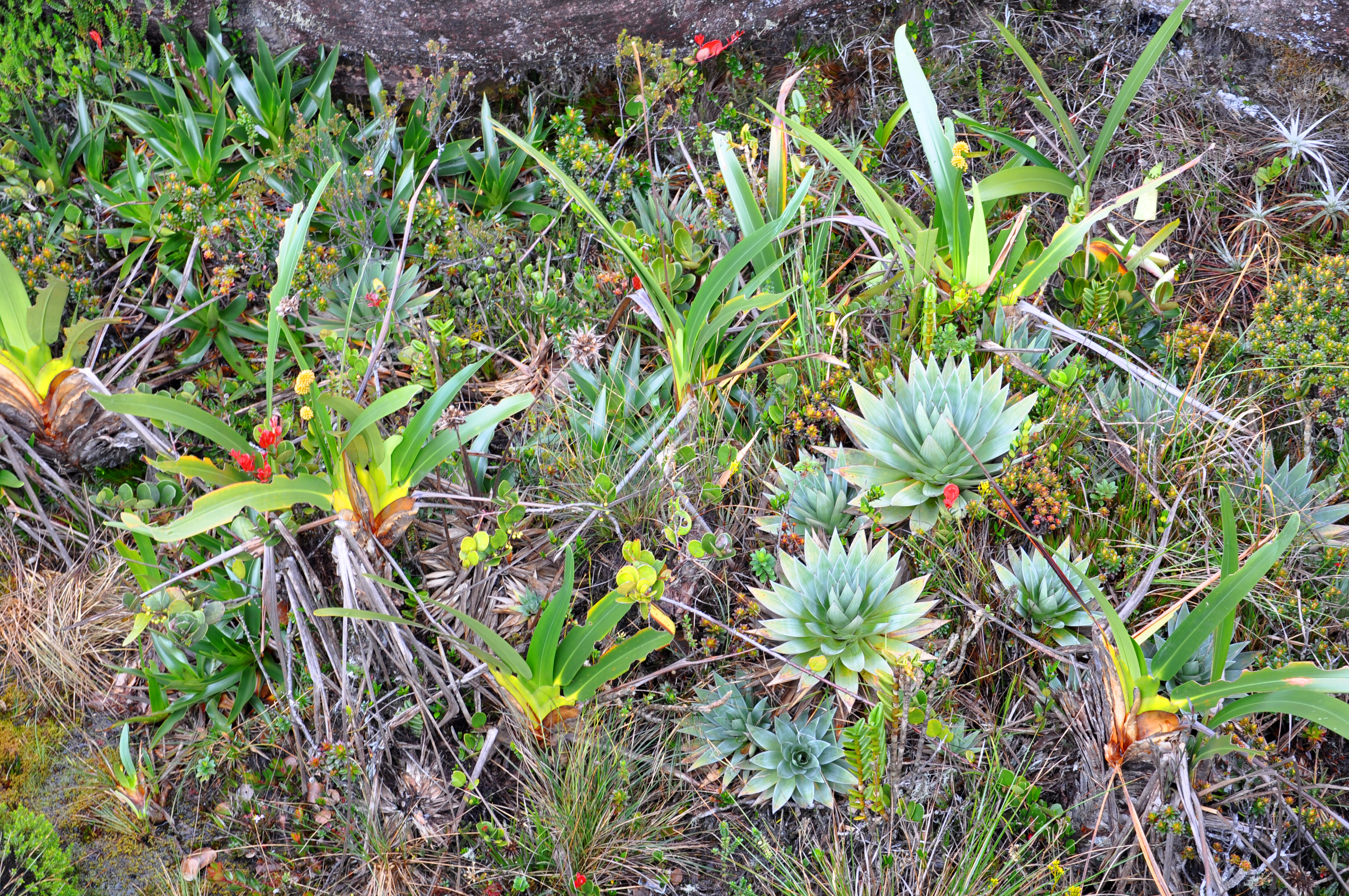
Tepui shrublands are considered Least Concern (LC).

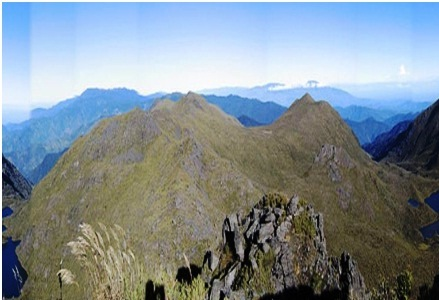
The Costa Rican Páramo have been evaluated as Data Deficient and are pending further studies to assess their risk of collapse.

The acronyms of the RLE risk categories (CO, CR, EN, VU, NT, LC, DD, NE) are in English and, unlike others, do not change in line with the language in which the document where they appear is written.

==== Collapsed (CO) ====
An ecosystem is Collapsed when it is virtually certain that its defining biotic or abiotic features are lost from all occurrences, and the characteristic native biota are no longer sustained. This category is only assigned when assessors are virtually certain (>99% probability) of the assessment outcome, otherwise, if Collapsed is the more likely category, it should listed as Critically Endangered with upper bound of Collapsed.

Collapse is considered an endpoint of ecosystem decline and degradation and is thus the most extreme outcome of the risk assessment protocol. For this reason, this category must only be assigned when the evidence complies a very high standard. Unlike the analogous process of species extinction, collapse is theoretically reversible. In other assessment protocols, the terms 'extinct', 'eliminated' or 'disappeared' are often used instead of 'collapsed'.

Currently, the IUCN Red List of Ecosystems only has two ecosystems classified as collapsed. These are the Aral Sea of Kazakhstan and Uzbekistan, and the Central Ayeyarwady palm savanna of Myanmar.

==== Critically endangered (CR) ====
An ecosystem is Critically Endangered when the best available evidence indicates that it meets any of the criteria A to E for Critically Endangered. It is therefore considered to be at an extremely high risk of collapse. Formally this represents a 50% probability of collapse in a time frame of 50 years into the future (according to criterion E). In practice, this category is delimited by thresholds based on a compromise between theoretical and practical considerations: For criteria related to decline in ecosystem distribution (criterion A), degradation of abiotic environment (criterion C) and disruption of biotic interactions and processes (criterion D) the threshold values were set at high values for current and future declines (80%), and a higher value for historical declines (90%). For the assessment of restricted distribution (criterion B) the thresholds have been set following several simulation tests regarding the effect of spatially explicit threats on ecosystems with different spatial configurations.

==== Endangered (EN) ====
An ecosystem is Endangered when the best available evidence indicates that it meets any of the criteria A to E for Endangered. It is therefore considered to be at a very high risk of collapse. Formally this represents a 20% probability of collapse in a time frame of 50 years into the future (according to criterion E). For criteria related to decline in ecosystem distribution (criterion A), degradation of abiotic environment (criterion C) and disruption of biotic interactions and processes (criterion D) the threshold values were set at intermediate values for current and future declines (50%), and a higher value for historical declines (70%). For the assessment of restricted distribution (criterion B) the thresholds have been set following several simulation tests regarding the effect of spatially explicit threats on ecosystems with different spatial configurations.

Formally an ecosystem is considered Endangered when there is a 20% probability of collapse in a time frame of 50 years into the future. In practice, this category is delimited by thresholds based on a compromise between theoretical and practical considerations, and might be considered artificial by some critics.

Some examples of endangered ecosystems are:

- Caribbean Coral Reefs
- Intertidal mudflats of the French Atlantic coast
- Tidal flats of the Yellow Sea
- Coastal lowland rainforests of the wet tropics bioregion, Queensland, Australia
- Saltmarshes in Moreton Bay, Queensland, Australia

The term endangered has also been used in other contexts with similar meaning but slightly different definitions. A proposal of classification of Endangered Ecosystems of the United States considered the category endangered for ecosystems evidencing 85–98% decline. The Helsinki Commission used the category endangered to denote a heavy decline in distribution or quality of baltic habitats and biotopes.

==== Vulnerable (VU) ====
An ecosystem is Vulnerable when the best available evidence indicates that it meets any of the criteria A to E for Vulnerable. It is therefore considered to be at a high risk of collapse. Formally this represents a 10% probability of collapse in a time frame of 100 years into the future (according to criterion E). For criteria related to decline in ecosystem distribution (criterion A), degradation of abiotic environment (criterion C) and disruption of biotic interactions and processes (criterion D) the threshold values were set at low values for current and future declines (30%), and an intermediate value for historical declines (50%). For the assessment of restricted distribution (criterion B) the thresholds have been set following several simulation tests regarding the effect of spatially explicit threats on ecosystems with different spatial configurations.

==== Near Threatened (NT) ====
An ecosystem is Near Threatened when it has been evaluated against the criteria but does not qualify for Critically Endangered, Endangered or Vulnerable now, but is close to qualifying for or is likely to qualify for a threatened category in the near future.

==== Least Concern (LC) ====
An ecosystem is Least Concern when it has been evaluated against the criteria and does not qualify for Critically Endangered, Endangered, Vulnerable or Near Threatened. Widely distributed and relatively undegraded ecosystems are included in this category. Theoretically, all ecosystems have some risk of collapse, just as all species face some risk of extinction. The term Least concern reflects the fact that this risk is relatively low. In practice this category is reserved for ecosystems that unambiguously meet none of the quantitative criteria (decline in distribution, restricted distribution, degradation of environmental conditions or disruption of biotic processes and interactions).

==== Data Deficient (DD) ====
An ecosystem is Data Deficient when there is inadequate information to make a direct, or indirect, assessment of its risk of collapse based on decline in distribution, disruption of ecological function or degradation of the physical environment. Data Deficient is not a category of threat, and does not imply any level of collapse risk. Listing of ecosystems in this category indicates that their situation has been reviewed, but that more information is required to determine their risk status.

==== Not Evaluated (NE) ====
An ecosystem is Not Evaluated when it has not yet been evaluated against the criteria. The category of 'Not Evaluated' does not indicate that an ecosystem is not at risk from collapse, but simply that the ecosystem has not yet been studied for any risk to be quantified and published.

=== Criteria (A-E) ===
Two of the criteria for assigning ecosystems to a risk category evaluate the spatial symptoms of the ecosystem's collapse: decrease in distribution (A) and restricted distribution (B). Two evaluate the functional symptoms of the ecosystem's collapse: environmental degradation (C) and interruption of biotic processes and interactions (D). Multiple threats and symptoms can be integrated into an ecosystem dynamics model to produce quantitative estimates of the risk of collapse (E).

The RLE risk categories acronyms (CO, CR, EN, VU, NT, LC, DD, NE) are in English and, unlike others, do not change in line with the language in which it is written. the document where they appear.

== Adoption and application ==
The IUCN Red List of Ecosystems criteria and categories have been used in different contexts. There are examples of local, national and continental application. Some countries, like Finland, have adopted these guidelines as an official system to assess risk to ecosystems.

== Guidelines for the application of IUCN Red List of Ecosystems Categories and Criteria ==
The Guidelines for the application of IUCN Red List of Ecosystems Categories and Criteria are documents that help the correct application of the Categories and Criteria of the IUCN Red List of Ecosystems, providing information on the development of the protocol and a detailed description of the scientific foundations that support the categories and criteria. To date, two versions have been published:

- Version 1.0 (2016)
- Version 1.1 (2017)
- Version 2.0 (2024)

== Impacts, critique and challenges ==
The development of the IUCN Red List of Ecosystems considered tradeoffs between generality, precision, realism and simplicity. Conceptual and operational weaknesses of the RLE approach, categories, and criteria have been discussed and debated. A fair evaluation of it effectiveness and importance needs to consider its real achievements in conservation and natural resource management, a balance between benefits and limitations and its performance against alternative methods.

The Red List of Ecosystems is a relatively recent product, and it is still difficult to measure its medium and long-term impact. Overall investment has been modest compared to other, long standing conservation knowledge products, but its reception in public audiences and media has been positive. It is considered a potentially important tool for creating indicators of progress of international policy, such as the Aichi Biodiversity Targets and the Sustainable Development Goals, but it is still lacking widespread implementation and adoption.

Some arguments against the wide adoption of the RLE are the lack of consistent means to classify ecosystems for assessing conservation status, technical difficulties with the concept of ecosystem collapse and lack of scientific basis for the criteria and thresholds. Classification and spatial representation of ecosystems is a major challenge in itself. While a standard taxonomy of organisms has existed for nearly 300 years, the principles for systematization of ecosystem diversity have only been laid out recently and still require wider adoption.

The concept of ecosystem collapse is still a major point of debate. Despite the strong empirical evidence, anticipating collapse is a complex problem. Although states of ecosystem collapse are often defined quantitatively, few studies adequately describe transitions from pristine or original state towards collapse.

Given the real need to evaluate risk to ecosystems and set national and regional conservation priorities, there is a clear advantages in using a flexible and standard approach that is comparable between regions and countries. This would save time and resources previously used to develop local guidelines, and would allow regions to share and compare experiences, and avoid common pitfalls.

== See also ==
- International Union for Conservation of Nature
- Red List of Threatened Species
- Conservation biology
